= National Register of Historic Places listings in Walsh County, North Dakota =

Location of Walsh County in North Dakota

This is a list of the National Register of Historic Places listings in Walsh County, North Dakota.

This is intended to be a complete list of the properties and districts on the National Register of Historic Places in Walsh County, North Dakota, United States. The locations of National Register properties and districts for which the latitude and longitude coordinates are included below, may be seen in a map.

There are 15 properties and districts listed on the National Register in the county. Another two properties were once listed but have been removed.

Contents: Counties in North Dakota
Adams | Barnes | Benson | Billings | Bottineau | Bowman | Burke | Burleigh | Cass | Cavalier | Dickey | Divide | Dunn | Eddy | Emmons | Foster | Golden Valley | Grand Forks | Grant | Griggs | Hettinger | Kidder | LaMoure | Logan | McHenry | McIntosh | McKenzie | McLean | Mercer | Morton | Mountrail | Nelson | Oliver | Pembina | Pierce | Ramsey | Ransom | Renville | Richland | Rolette | Sargent | Sheridan | Sioux | Slope | Stark | Steele | Stutsman | Towner | Traill | Walsh | Ward | Wells | Williams

This National Park Service list is complete through NPS recent listings posted August 7, 2026.

== Current listings ==
	Name on the Register	Image	Date listed	Location	City or town	Description
1	District No. 70-Hoff Rural School		March 20, 2008 (#08000233)	Fire No. 6591 123rd Ave., NE. (Norton Township); 48°22′08″N 97°59′23″W	Adams	
2	Edinburg WPA Auditorium	Edinburg WPA Auditorium	November 7, 2013 (#13000863)	67 Main St. 48°29′45″N 97°51′51″W	Edinburg	Federal Relief Construction in North Dakota, 1931-1943, MPS
3	Elmwood		February 21, 1985 (#85000339)	P.O. Box 654; 48°25′19″N 97°24′18″W	Grafton	
4	Forest River State Bank	Forest River State Bank	December 5, 2019 (#100004715)	110 Front St. 48°12′50″N 97°28′07″W	Forest River	
5	Grafton State School	Grafton State School	November 6, 1996 (#96001191)	700 6th St., W. 48°25′07″N 97°25′26″W	Grafton	
6	Minto School	Minto School	January 30, 1992 (#91002002)	Junction of Major Ave. and 3rd St. 48°17′35″N 97°22′25″W	Minto	
7	Pisek School	Pisek School	March 17, 1994 (#94000220)	Eastern end of Main St. at Lovcik Ave. 48°18′37″N 97°42′21″W	Pisek	
8	Ridge Trail Historic District		March 17, 2006 (#05001333)	Address Restricted	Kensington	Historic trail segments in Walsh and Pembina Counties.
9	St. Catherine's Church of Lomice, North Dakota	St. Catherine's Church of Lomice, North Dakota	April 12, 2006 (#06000249)	4 miles west and 2 miles south of the junction of ND 35 and County Road 15; 48°16′53″N 98°12′35″W	Whitman	
10	St. Joseph's Chapel	St. Joseph's Chapel	June 2, 1994 (#94000556)	Between Interstate 29 and the Red River, east of Minto, in Pulaski Township; 48°18′35″N 97°08′42″W	Minto	
11	St. Stanislaus Church Historic District	St. Stanislaus Church Historic District	August 3, 1979 (#79001776)	Off Interstate 29; 48°17′41″N 97°15′11″W	Warsaw	
12	State Bank of Edinburg	State Bank of Edinburg	May 30, 2001 (#01000588)	300 Main Ave. 48°29′45″N 97°51′52″W	Edinburg	
13	Strand Theatre	Strand Theatre	April 14, 2004 (#04000299)	618 Hill Ave. 48°25′05″N 97°24′37″W	Grafton	
14	US Post Office-Grafton	US Post Office-Grafton	November 1, 1989 (#89001756)	506 S. Griggs Ave. 48°25′09″N 97°24′42″W	Grafton	
15	Walsh County Courthouse	Walsh County Courthouse	November 25, 1985 (#85002992)	638 Cooper Ave. 48°25′06″N 97°24′15″W	Grafton	

== Former listing ==
	Name on the Register	Image	Date listed	Date removed	Location	City or town	Description
1	Nordre Trefoldegheds Menigheds		February 20, 2004 (#04000058)	August 7, 2026	6 miles west and 3/8 miles south of the junction of U.S. Route 81 and County Road 9; 48°27′56″N 97°33′28″W	Nash	
2	Odalen Lutherske Kirke		January 11, 2006 (#05001517)	November 28, 2007	6 miles west and ¼ miles north of the junction of ND 32 and County Road 9 in Tiber Township; 48°25′06″N 97°24′15″W	Edinburg	Burned to ground on June 21, 2007. Cemetery which was included in listing remains, but was delisted November 28, 2007

== See also ==
- List of National Historic Landmarks in North Dakota
- National Register of Historic Places listings in North Dakota
