= Interstate 29 in North Dakota =

Highway in North Dakota

Interstate 29
- I-29 highlighted in red

Route information
- Maintained by NDDOT
- Length: 217.517 mi (350.060 km)
- NHS: Entire route

Major junctions
- South end: I-29 / US 81 at the South Dakota state line near Hankinson
- I-94 / US 52 in Fargo; US 10 / I-94 BL in Fargo; ND 200 / ND 200A by Hillsboro; US 2 in Grand Forks; US 81 in Manvel; US 81 / ND 5 near Joliette
- North end: US 81 / PTH 75 at the Canadian border in Pembina

Location
- Country: United States
- State: North Dakota
- Counties: Richland, Cass, Traill, Grand Forks, Walsh, Pembina

Highway system
- Interstate Highway System; Main; Auxiliary; Suffixed; Business; Future; North Dakota State Highway System; Interstate; US; State
← ND 28	→ ND 30

Interstate 29 (I-29) in the US state of North Dakota runs from the state's southern border with South Dakota near Hankinson to the Canadian border just north of Pembina. The highway runs concurrently twice with U.S. Highway 81 (US 81). The first such overlap begins in Watertown, South Dakota, across the state line to Manvel. The other is from exit 203 to the Canadian border. The highway runs somewhat parallel to the Minnesota border to the east and passes through two major cities, Fargo and Grand Forks.

== Route description ==
=== South Dakota to Fargo ===
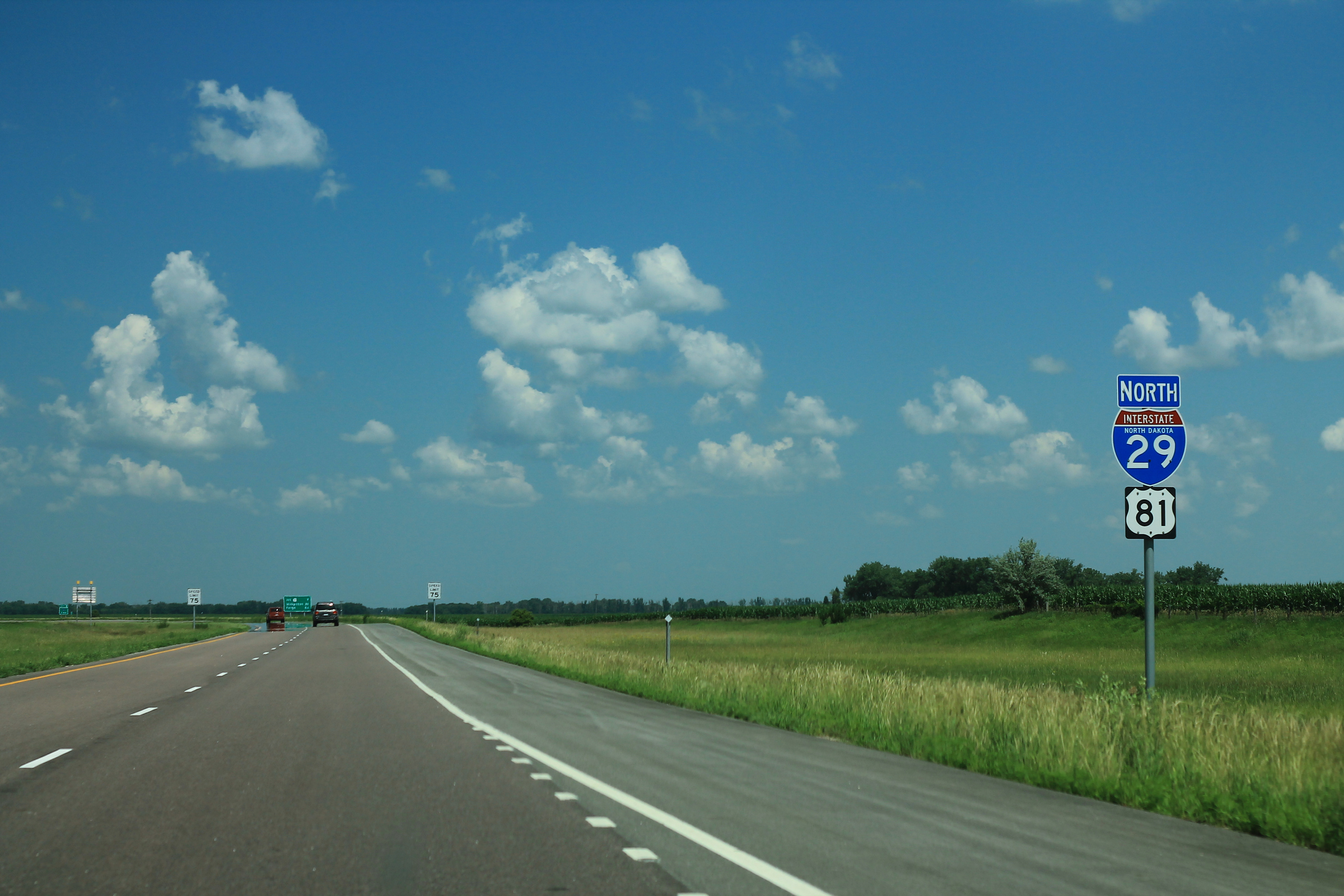
I-29 northbound just north of South Dakota border

I-29 enters North Dakota, with a speed limit of 80 mph (130 km/h), from South Dakota to the south, traveling in a north-northeasterly direction at an approximate elevation of 1,100 feet (340 m) above sea level. The first exit in the state, exit 1, is to a county road built along the state line. This exit serves the Dakota Magic Casino and Hotel. Rural exits are somewhat common in North Dakota. There are exits with no major communities near them about every eight miles (13 km) from the South Dakota state line to Fargo. There is also one exit serving North Dakota Highway 11 (ND 11) to Hankinson and one exit serving ND 13 to Wahpeton. Other small communities served include Fairmount, Great Bend, Mooreton, Dwight, Colfax, Abercrombie, Walcott, Christine and Oxbow.

=== Fargo to Grand Forks ===
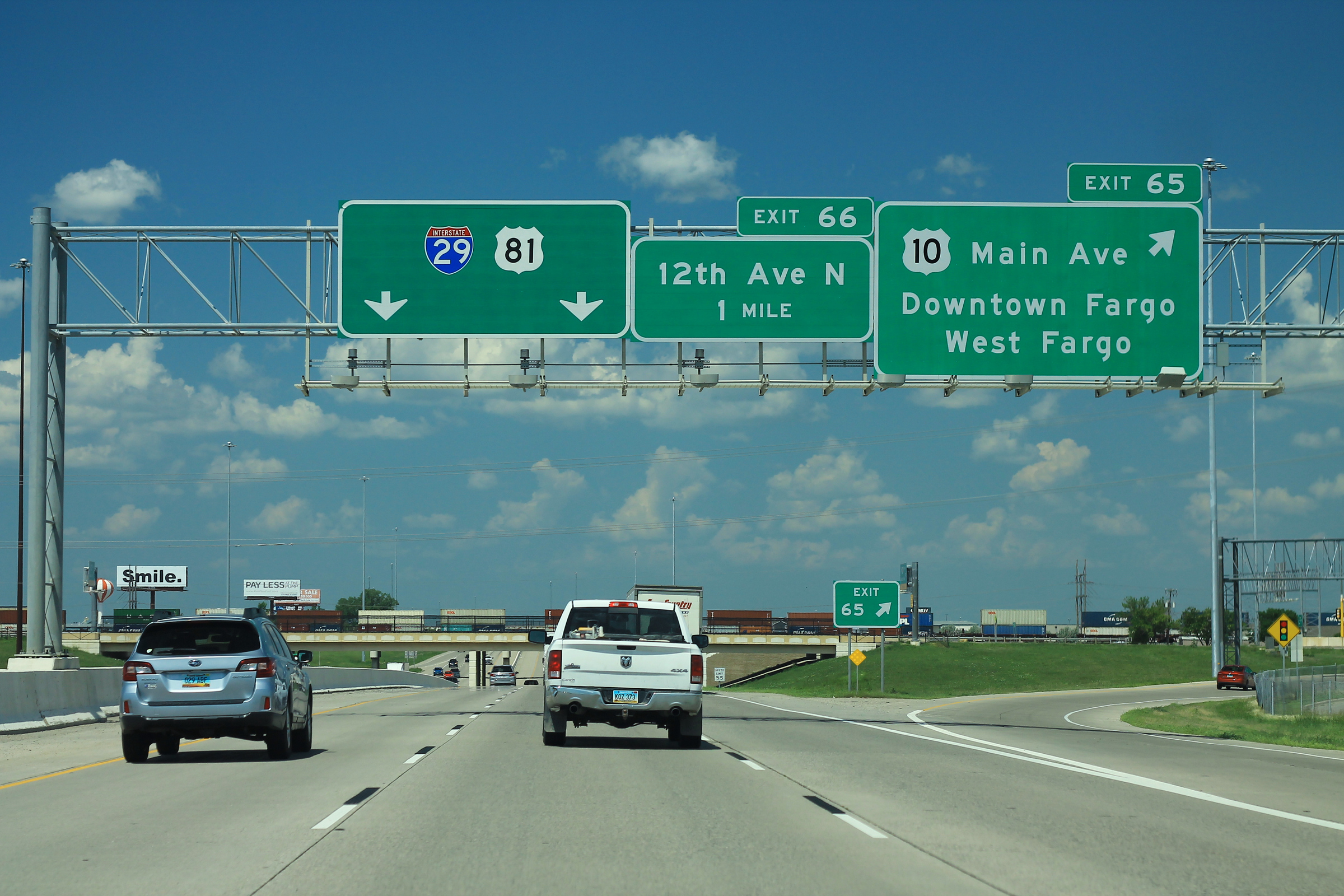
I-29 at exit 65 in Fargo

I-29 has a speed limit of 65 mph (105 km/h) between exits 60 and 62, and a speed limit of 55 mph (89 km/h) for the next six exits in Fargo, including interchanges with I-94/US 52, and US 10 which connect Fargo with Bismarck (North Dakota's state capital) to the west and Minneapolis to the east. A flyover ramp runs from southbound I-29 to eastbound I-94. There is also an exit that serves Hector International Airport. Following this exit, the speed limit increases to 65 mph (105 km/h) at mile 68, and then increases to 80 mph (130 km/h). There is an exit farther north that indirectly serves Fargo via County Road 22 (CR 22) and mainly serves Harwood.

North of Fargo and Harwood, with a speed limit of 80 mph (130 km/h), the route runs close to the old road of U.S. 81 and comes close to the communities of Argusville, Gardner, Grandin, Hillsboro, Buxton, Reynolds and Thompson. There are exits roughly every six miles (9.7 km) until the route enters Hillsboro. I-29 has one exit south of the city serving its municipal airport and one exit serving the city itself. Going through Hillsboro is ND 200, a major thoroughfare across central North Dakota, which meets I-29 north of Hillsboro. There are three more exits between Hillsboro and Grand Forks, including one serving Thompson, the southernmost suburb of Grand Forks.

=== Grand Forks to Canada ===
The highway has a speed limit of 70 mph (110 km/h), and just four exits serving Grand Forks. One of them serves US 2, which leads to Grand Forks International Airport and points further west including Minot and Glacier National Park in Montana.

With a speed limit of 80 mph (130 km/h), 10 miles (16 km) north of the city, I-29's first concurrency with US 81 ends in Manvel. The highway's next exit is 10 miles (16 km) north of Manvel at an interchange with ND 54, which indirectly serves Oslo, Minnesota, about three miles (4.8 km) east of the Interstate. There are a couple more minor exits between the Oslo exit and Drayton. The highway has two exits in Drayton, one with ND 44 and one with ND 66.

After several more exits in the open country serving minor county highways, I-29 begins another concurrency with US 81 at an exit with ND 5. After one more exit serving a county road, the highways enter Pembina. In Pembina, I-29 has its final exit in the United States at an interchange with ND 59 and CR 55. Three miles (4.8 km) north of Pembina, I-29/US 81 enters Manitoba, Canada, and becomes Provincial Trunk Highway 75 (PTH 75), which leads north to Winnipeg. The highway crosses the international border at an approximate elevation of 800 feet (245 m) above sea level.

== History ==
I-29 between Fargo and the Canadian border was originally meant to be signed as Interstate 31 (I-31). There was no highway originally planned between Fargo and Sioux Falls, South Dakota. Plans for I-29 were extended from Sioux Falls to Fargo in October 1957, and the entire highway from Kansas City, Missouri, to the Canadian border was signed as I-29. The final stages of I-29 in North Dakota were completed in 1977.

== Exit list ==
County	Location	mi	km	Exit	Destinations	Notes
Richland	Greendale Township	0.000	0.000		I-29 south / US 81 south – Sioux Falls	Continuation into South Dakota
Richland	Greendale Township	0.013	0.021	1	CR 1E	
Richland	Greendale Township	2.074	3.338	2	CR 22	
Richland	Waldo Township	8.073	12.992	8	ND 11 – Hankinson, Fairmount	
Richland	Brandenburg Township	15.079	24.267	15	CR 16 – Great Bend, Mantador	
Richland	Mooreton Township	22.583	36.344	23	ND 13 – Wahpeton, Mooreton	Signed as exits 23A (east) and 23B (west) southbound; Also access to Bagg Bonanza Farm, Chahinkapa Zoo, North Dakota State College of Science
Richland	Ibsen Township	26.030	41.891	26	Dwight	
Richland	Abercrombie Township	31.038	49.951	31	CR 8 – Galchutt	
Richland	Colfax Township	37.047	59.621	37	CR 4 – Colfax, Abercrombie	
Richland	Colfax–Walcott township line	42.117	67.781	42	CR 2 – Walcott	
Richland	Walcott Township	44.126	71.014	44	Christine	
Richland–Cass county line	Walcott–Pleasant township line	48.182	77.541	48	ND 46 – Kindred	
Cass	Pleasant Township	50.186	80.767	50	CR 18 – Hickson, Oxbow	
Cass	Pleasant–Stanley township line	54.167	87.173	54	CR 16 – Oxbow, Davenport	
Cass	Stanley Township	56.429	90.814	56	Wild Rice, Horace	
Cass	Fargo	60.252	96.966	60	US 81 Bus. north (52nd Avenue South)	Southern terminus of US 81 Bus.
Cass	Fargo	62.249	100.180	62	32nd Avenue South	Signed as exits 62A (east) and 62B (west) southbound
Cass	Fargo	63.267	101.818	63	I-94 / US 52 – Bismarck, Minneapolis	Signed as exits 63A (east) and 63B (west); I-94 exits 349A-B; also access to Moorhead
Cass	Fargo	64.252	103.404	64	38th Street Southwest, 13th Avenue South	Access to West Acres Mall
Cass	Fargo	65.252	105.013	65	I-94 BL (Main Avenue) / US 10 – Downtown Fargo, West Fargo	Also access to Bonanzaville USA, Red River Valley Fairgrounds, Hjemkomst Center
Cass	Fargo	66.255	106.627	66	ND 294 east (12th Avenue North)	Western terminus of ND 294; Also access to North Dakota State University, Fargodome, Newman Outdoor Field
Cass	Fargo	67.258	108.241	67	US 81 Bus. south (19th Avenue North)	Northern terminus of US 81 Bus.; also access to North Dakota State University, Fargodome, Newman Outdoor Field, Hector International Airport, Air Museum, VA Hospital, North Dakota Horse Park
Cass	Fargo	69.374	111.647	69	CR 20 (40th Avenue North) – Reile's Acres	Also access to Fargo National Cemetery
Cass	Harwood	72.778	117.125	72	Harwood	Formerly exit 73
Cass	Argusville	78.542	126.401	78	Argusville	Formerly exit 79
Cass	Gardner	85.826	138.124	85	Gardner	Formerly exit 86
Cass–Traill county line	Kinyon–Kelso township line	92.142	148.288	92	Grandin	
Traill	Hillsboro Township	100.391	161.564	100	ND 200 east – Halstad ND 200A west – Blanchard	
Traill	Hillsboro			104	Hillsboro	
Traill	Eldorado–Ervin township line	110.795	178.307	111	ND 200 – Mayville, Cummings	Also access to Mayville State University
Traill	Stavanger Township	117.987	189.882	118	Buxton	
Traill–Grand Forks county line	Stavanger–Americus township line	123.001	197.951	123	CR 25 – Reynolds	
Grand Forks	Walle Township	130.043	209.284	130	ND 15 west – Thompson CR 81A east	
Grand Forks	Grand Forks	138.146	222.324	138	US 81 Bus. north (32nd Avenue South)	Southern terminus of US 81 Bus.; also access to Alerus Center, Columbia Mall
Grand Forks	Grand Forks	140.195	225.622	140	ND 297 east (DeMers Avenue) – Downtown	Western terminus of ND 297; also access to University of North Dakota, Alerus Center
Grand Forks	Grand Forks	141.196	227.233	141	US 2 (Gateway Drive) – Downtown	Also access to Ralph Engelstad Arena, Grand Forks AFB, Grand Forks International Airport
Grand Forks	Grand Forks	144.711	232.890	145	US 81 Bus. south (North Washington Street)	Northern terminus of US 81 Bus.
Grand Forks	Ferry Township	152.211	244.960	152	US 81 north – Manvel, Gilby	Northern end of US 81 concurrency
Grand Forks	Turtle River Township	156.680	252.152	157	No name exit	
Walsh	Walshville Township	160.927	258.987	161	ND 54 east – Oslo CR 19 west – Ardoch	
Walsh	Walshville Township	163.699	263.448	164	No name exit	
Walsh	Pulaski Township	167.722	269.922	168	CR 15 – Warsaw, Minto	
Walsh	Pulaski Township	171.723	276.361	172	No name exit	
Walsh	Acton Township	175.792	282.910	176	ND 17 – Grafton	
Walsh	St. Andrews Township	179.876	289.482	180	No name exit	
Walsh	St. Andrews Township	184.038	296.180	184	Drayton	
Pembina	Drayton Township	186.881	300.756	187	ND 66 – Drayton	Also access to Donaldson
Pembina	Drayton–Lincoln township line	190.955	307.312	191	CR 11 – St. Thomas	
Pembina	Lincoln Township	192.960	310.539	193	No name exit	
Pembina	Lincoln Township	196.014	315.454	196	CR 3	
Pembina	Joliette Township	200.243	322.260	200	No name exit	
Pembina	Joliette Township	203.413	327.361	203	US 81 south / ND 5 – Hamilton, Cavalier	Southern end of US 81 concurrency; also access to Hallock
Pembina	Joliette Township	208.473	335.505	208	CR 1 – Bathgate	
Pembina	Pembina Township	212.717	342.335	212	No name exit	
Pembina	Pembina Township	215.237	346.390	215	ND 59 / CR 55 – Neche, Pembina	
Pembina	Pembina Township	217.517	350.060	Canadian border at the Pembina–Emerson Border Crossing		
Pembina	Pembina Township	217.517	350.060		PTH 75 north – Winnipeg	Northern terminus of I-29 and US 81; formerly PTH 29; continuation into Manitoba
1.000 mi = 1.609 km; 1.000 km = 0.621 mi: Concurrency terminus

== See also ==
- Manitoba Highway 29

Interstate 29
Previous state: South Dakota	North Dakota	Next state: Terminus
