= National Register of Historic Places listings in Pembina County, North Dakota =

Location of Pembina County in North Dakota

This is a list of the National Register of Historic Places listings in Pembina County, North Dakota.

This is intended to be a complete list of the properties and districts on the National Register of Historic Places in Pembina County, North Dakota, United States. The locations of National Register properties and districts for which the latitude and longitude coordinates are included below, may be seen in a map.

There are 13 properties and districts listed on the National Register in the county.

Contents: Counties in North Dakota
Adams | Barnes | Benson | Billings | Bottineau | Bowman | Burke | Burleigh | Cass | Cavalier | Dickey | Divide | Dunn | Eddy | Emmons | Foster | Golden Valley | Grand Forks | Grant | Griggs | Hettinger | Kidder | LaMoure | Logan | McHenry | McIntosh | McKenzie | McLean | Mercer | Morton | Mountrail | Nelson | Oliver | Pembina | Pierce | Ramsey | Ransom | Renville | Richland | Rolette | Sargent | Sheridan | Sioux | Slope | Stark | Steele | Stutsman | Towner | Traill | Walsh | Ward | Wells | Williams

This National Park Service list is complete through NPS recent listings posted May 1, 2026.

== Current listings ==
	Name on the Register	Image	Date listed	Location	City or town	Description
1	Crystal Bridge		May 30, 1997 (#97000507)	Appleton Ave. over Cart Creek; 48°35′49″N 97°40′20″W	Crystal	
2	Dease-Martineau House, Trading Post and Oxcart Trail Segments		December 22, 2017 (#100001744)	13565 105th St. NE. 48°56′05″N 97°44′09″W	Leroy vicinity	
3	Drayton United Methodist Church	Drayton United Methodist Church	December 10, 1979 (#79001773)	ND 44; 48°33′48″N 97°10′37″W	Drayton	
4	Gingras House and Trading Post	Gingras House and Trading Post	May 21, 1975 (#75001305)	Northeast of Walhalla off ND 32; 48°56′13″N 97°53′26″W	Walhalla	
5	Grace Episcopal Church	Grace Episcopal Church	September 2, 1994 (#94001075)	152 Ramsey St., W. 48°57′57″N 97°14′45″W	Pembina	
6	Gunlogson Farmstead Historic Site	Gunlogson Farmstead Historic Site	September 18, 2008 (#08000232)	13571 ND 5; 48°46′22″N 97°44′06″W	Cavalier	
7	Icelandic Evangelical Lutheran Church	Icelandic Evangelical Lutheran Church	December 5, 2019 (#100004714)	415 Beaupre St. (aka Adelaide St.); 48°57′43″N 97°14′35″W	Pembina	Onion-domed church
8	O'Connor House		July 3, 1980 (#80004544)	Off U.S. Route 81; 48°36′57″N 97°26′54″W	St. Thomas	
9	Pembina County Courthouse	Pembina County Courthouse	November 25, 1980 (#80002923)	301 Dakota Street W 48°47′28″N 97°37′31″W	Cavalier	
10	Ridge Trail Historic District	Ridge Trail Historic District	March 17, 2006 (#05001333)	Address Restricted	Kensington	Historic trail segments in Walsh and Pembina Counties.
11	US Customs House and Post Office-Pembina	US Customs House and Post Office-Pembina	November 1, 1989 (#89001755)	125 S. Cavalier St. 48°57′59″N 97°14′39″W	Pembina	
12	Vikur Lutheran Church at Mountain	Vikur Lutheran Church at Mountain	November 7, 2013 (#13000862)	290 Main Ave. 48°40′52″N 97°51′54″W	Mountain	
13	Walla Theater	Walla Theater	May 17, 2010 (#10000266)	909 Central Ave. 48°55′19″N 97°55′00″W	Walhalla	

== See also ==
- List of National Historic Landmarks in North Dakota
- National Register of Historic Places listings in North Dakota
