= Glenwood Township =

Glenwood Township may refer to:

- Glenwood Township, Mills County, Iowa
- Glenwood Township, Winneshiek County, Iowa, in Winneshiek County, Iowa
- Glenwood Township, Phillips County, Kansas, in Phillips County, Kansas
- Glenwood Township, Pope County, Minnesota
- Glenwood Township, Schuyler County, Missouri
- Glenwood Township, Gage County, Nebraska
- Glenwood Township, Walsh County, North Dakota
- Glenwood Township, Clay County, South Dakota, in Clay County, South Dakota
- Glenwood Township, Deuel County, South Dakota, in Deuel County, South Dakota
