= Dundee Township =

Dundee Township may refer to:

- Dundee Township, Kane County, Illinois
- Dundee Township, Michigan
- Dundee Township, Walsh County, North Dakota
