= Ardoch National Wildlife Refuge =

Protected area in North Dakota, US

- Location within North Dakota Location within the United States
- Location: Walsh County, North Dakota
- Nearest city: Ardoch, North Dakota
- Coordinates: 48°14′01″N 97°18′51″W
- Established: 1939
- Governing body: Devils Lake Wetland Management District and United States Fish and Wildlife Service

Ardoch National Wildlife Refuge is a National Wildlife Refuge in Walsh County, North Dakota. It is managed under Devils Lake Wetland Management District.

Ardoch National Wildlife Refuge was established in 1939, and originally consisted of 2,696 acres of flowage and refuge easements and 288 acres of fee title land around Lake Ardoch, a reservoir. Since then, 80 acres of easement land have been deleted and an additional 20 acres of fee title land has been added.

This is a limited-interest national wildlife refuge. The FWS has an easement on private property allowing it to manage wildlife habitat, but the land remains private property. There is no public access except from adjacent public roads. Limited-interest refuges were created in the 1930s and 1940s in response to declining waterfowl populations and the need to get people back to work during the Great Depression. Many landowners sold easements allowing the federal government to regulate water levels and restrict hunting.
