= Argusville =

Argusville may refer to:

== Places ==
=== United States ===
- Argusville, New York, a hamlet in the Schoharie County towns of Carlisle and Sharon
- Argusville, North Dakota
