= District No. 70-Hoff Rural School =

- U.S. National Register of Historic Places
- Location within North Dakota Location within the United States
- Nearest city: Adams, North Dakota
- Coordinates: 48°22′09″N 97°59′25″W
- Area: 0.4 acres (0.16 ha)
- Built: 1885
- Architectural style: Classical Revival
- NRHP reference No.: 08000233
- Added to NRHP: March 20, 2008

District No. 70-Hoff Rural School near Adams, North Dakota was built in 1885. It was listed on the National Register of Historic Places in 2008.

It is a small wood-frame building. It was a country school "typical of many one-room school buildings", located near the boundary line between Norton and Vesta townships.
