= Acton Township =

Acton Township may refer to the following townships in the United States:

- Acton Township, Meeker County, Minnesota
- Acton Township, Walsh County, North Dakota
