= Carl M. Grimstad =

American politician (1856–1940)

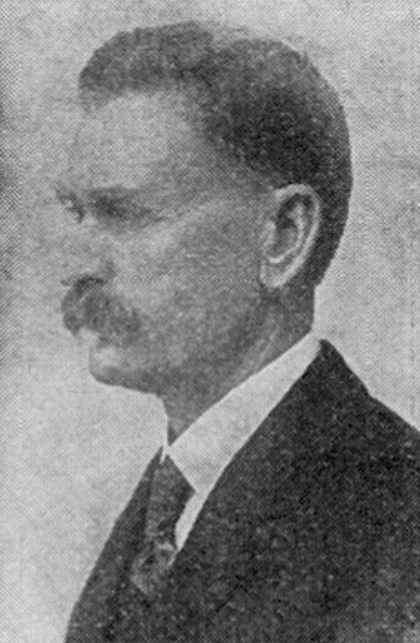

Member of the Wisconsin State Assembly
- In office 1919, 1921, 1923

Personal details
- Born: Carl Martin Grimstad; August 9, 1856 Iowa County, Wisconsin, US
- Died: February 28, 1940 (aged 83) Mount Horeb, Wisconsin, US
- Party: Progressive Republican
- Spouse: Julia Arneson (m. 1883)
- Children: 10
- Occupation: Dairy farmer

Carl Martin Grimstad (August 9, 1856 – February 28, 1940) was a pioneer in Dakota Territory and a dairy farmer in the state of Wisconsin. He also served as a member of the Wisconsin State Assembly.

== Biography ==
Grimstad was born at Brigham Township in Iowa County, Wisconsin. He was one of seven children born to Knudt Grimstvedt (1815–1900) and Mari Grimstvedt (1821–1907). His parents were Norwegian immigrants who had arrived in 1850 from Telemark, Norway.

In 1879, he moved to the Dakota Territory. In 1883, he married Gunhild "Julia" Arneson (1862–1960), with whom he had ten children. He served as town clerk of Fertile township and was the county assessor at Grafton, both in the Red River Valley of North Dakota. In 1889, the family moved to Mount Horeb, Wisconsin, where he operated a dairy farm. Dating from 1927, he was engaged in writing down his reminiscences of life as a pioneer in Dakota Territory. His auto-biography was published under the title Memoirs of Carl M. Grimstad, 1856–1940 as edited by his son-in-law Henry Bakken. He died of pneumonia in 1940 and was buried in Mount Horeb Union Cemetery in Dane County, Wisconsin.

== Political career ==
From 1918 to 1926, Grimstad held public office as a La Follette Progressive Republican. He was elected to the Wisconsin State Assembly in 1918 and re-elected in 1920 and 1922. In addition, he was chairman of Brigham and a member of the Iowa County, Wisconsin Board of Education.
