= North Dakota Highway 66 =

State highway in North Dakota, U.S.

North Dakota Highway 66

Route information
- Maintained by NDDOT
- Length: 138.720 mi (223.248 km)
- Existed: c. 1963–present

Major junctions
- West end: ND 3 south of Dunseith
- US 281 east of Bisbee; ND 1 north of Nekoma; ND 32 south of Mountain; ND 18 east of Crystal; US 81 in Saint Thomas; I-29 in Drayton
- East end: MN 11 at the MN state border in Drayton

Location
- Country: United States
- State: North Dakota
- Counties: Cavalier, Pembina, Rolette, Towner

Highway system
- North Dakota State Highway System; Interstate; US; State
| ← ND 65 | → ND 67 |

North Dakota Highway 66 (ND 66) is a 138.720-mile-long (223.248 km) east–west state highway in the U.S. state of North Dakota. ND 66's western terminus is at ND 3 south of Dunseith, and the eastern terminus is a continuation as Minnesota State Highway 11 (MN 11) at the Minnesota/ North Dakota border.

== Major intersections ==
| County | Location | mi | km | Destinations | Notes |
|---|---|---|---|---|---|
| Rolette | | 0.000 | 0.000 | ND 3 – Rugby, Dunseith | Western terminus |
| Rolette | | 19.635 | 31.599 | ND 30 north – Rolla | Southern terminus of ND 30 |
| Towner | | 37.997 | 61.150 | US 281 north – Rock Lake | Western end of US 281 concurrency |
| Towner | | 40.007 | 64.385 | US 281 south – Cando | Eastern end of US 281 concurrency |
| Cavalier | | 56.996 | 91.726 | ND 20 – Munich, Alsen, Starkweather | |
| Cavalier | | 78.981 | 127.108 | ND 1 – Langdon, Nekoma | |
| Pembina | | 101.868 | 163.941 | ND 32 north – Mountain | Western end of ND 32 concurrency |
| Pembina | | 103.872 | 167.166 | ND 32 south – Edinburg | Eastern end of ND 32 concurrency |
| Pembina | | 114.918 | 184.943 | ND 18 – Cavalier, Hoople | |
| Pembina | | 122.947 | 197.864 | US 81 north – St. Thomas | Western end of US 81 concurrency |
| Pembina | | 124.950 | 201.088 | US 81 south – Grafton | Eastern end of US 81 concurrency |
| Pembina | Drayton | 136.933 | 220.372 | I-29 – Winnipeg, Grand Forks | I-29 Exit 187 |
| Pembina | Drayton | 137.339 | 221.026 | ND 44 south | Northern terminus of ND 44 |
| Pembina | | 138.720 | 223.248 | MN 11 east – Donaldson | Continues east into Minnesota |
1.000 mi = 1.609 km; 1.000 km = 0.621 mi: Concurrency terminus
