= Golden Township =

Golden Township may refer to one of the following places in the united States:

- Golden Township, Michigan
- Golden Township, Holt County, Nebraska
- Golden Township, Walsh County, North Dakota
