= Farmington Township =

Farmington Township may refer to:

== Arkansas ==
- Farmington Township, Washington County, Arkansas

== Illinois ==
- Farmington Township, Fulton County, Illinois

== Iowa ==
- Farmington Township, Cedar County, Iowa
- Farmington Township, Van Buren County, Iowa

== Kansas ==
- Farmington Township, Republic County, Kansas, in Republic County, Kansas
- Farmington Township, Stafford County, Kansas, in Stafford County, Kansas
- Farmington Township, Washington County, Kansas, in Washington County, Kansas

== Michigan ==
- Farmington Township, Michigan, now the city of Farmington Hills

== Minnesota ==
- Farmington Township, Olmsted County, Minnesota

== North Dakota ==
- Farmington Township, Walsh County, North Dakota

== Ohio ==
- Farmington Township, Trumbull County, Ohio

== Pennsylvania ==
- Farmington Township, Clarion County, Pennsylvania
- Farmington Township, Tioga County, Pennsylvania
- Farmington Township, Warren County, Pennsylvania

== South Dakota ==
- Farmington Township, Day County, South Dakota, in Day County, South Dakota
- Farmington Township, Grant County, South Dakota, in Grant County, South Dakota
- Farmington Township, Lake County, South Dakota, in Lake County, South Dakota
