= Dewey Township =

Dewey Township may refer to the following townships in the United States:

- Dewey Township, LaPorte County, Indiana
- Dewey Township, Roseau County, Minnesota
- Dewey Township, Walsh County, North Dakota
