= Martin Township, Walsh County, North Dakota =

Coordinates: 48.5064°N 97.3319°W

Martin Township
- Township
- Interactive map of Martin Township
- Country: United States
- State: North Dakota
- County: Walsh County

Area
  - Total: 34.900 sq mi (90.391 km^{2})
  - Land: 34.100 sq mi (88.319 km^{2})
  - Water: 0.800 sq mi (2.072 km^{2})

Population
  - Total: 112
- Time zone: UTC-6 (CST)
  - Summer (DST): UTC-5 (CDT)

Martin Township is a township in Walsh County, North Dakota, United States.

== See also ==
- Walsh County, North Dakota
