= Ridge Trail Historic District =

Historic district in North Dakota, United States

- U.S. National Register of Historic Places
- U.S. Historic district
- Location: Address Restricted, Kensington, North Dakota
- Area: 47.7 acres (19.3 ha)
- NRHP reference No.: 05001333
- Added to NRHP: March 17, 2006

The Ridge Trail Historic District near Kensington, North Dakota is a 47.7-acre (19.3 ha) historic district encompassing portions of the first major settler trail through Walsh and Pembina Counties. It includes 8 segments of a rutted cart trail that was used to move people and supplies into the area from as far off as St. Paul, Minnesota.

The district was listed on the National Register of Historic Places in 2006.
