= Latona Township, Walsh County, North Dakota =

Coordinates: 48.3322°N 98.0872°W

Latona Township
- Township
- Interactive map of Latona Township
- Country: United States
- State: North Dakota
- County: Walsh County

Area
  - Total: 36.100 sq mi (93.499 km^{2})
  - Land: 35.00 sq mi (90.65 km^{2})
  - Water: 1.100 sq mi (2.849 km^{2})

Population
  - Total: 55
- Time zone: UTC-6 (CST)
  - Summer (DST): UTC-5 (CDT)

Latona Township is a township in Walsh County, North Dakota, United States.

== See also ==
- Walsh County, North Dakota
