= Conway, North Dakota =

- City
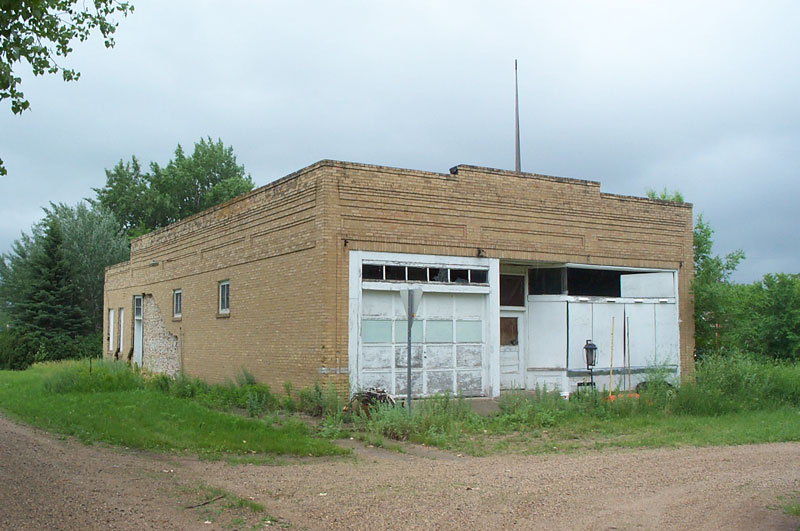
- An old service station in Conway

- Location of Conway, North Dakota
- Coordinates: 48.234279°N 97.675088°W
- Country: United States
- State: North Dakota
- County: Walsh
- Founded: 1885
- Incorporated: 1895

Area
  - Total: 0.206 sq mi (0.534 km^{2})
  - Land: 0.206 sq mi (0.534 km^{2})
  - Water: 0 sq mi (0.0 km^{2})
- Elevation: 980 ft (300 m)

Population (2020)
  - Total: 15
  - Estimate (2024): 14
  - Density: 72.8/sq mi (28.09/km^{2})
- Time zone: UTC–6 (Central (CST))
  - Summer (DST): UTC–5 (CDT)
- ZIP Code: 58233
- Area code: 701
- FIPS code: 38-15820
- GNIS feature ID: 1035977

Conway is a city in Walsh County, North Dakota, United States. The population was 15 at the 2020 census, and was estimated at 14 in 2024.

== History ==
Conway was founded in 1885.

== Geography ==
According to the United States Census Bureau, the city has a total area of 0.206 square miles (0.53 km^{2}), all land.

== Demographics ==
Historical population
Census	Pop.	Note	%±
1890	228		—
1900	216		−5.3%
1910	184		−14.8%
1920	148		−19.6%
1930	100		−32.4%
1940	120		20.0%
1950	107		−10.8%
1960	67		−37.4%
1970	57		−14.9%
1980	33		−42.1%
1990	24		−27.3%
2000	23		−4.2%
2010	23		0.0%
2020	15		−34.8%
2024 (est.)	14		−6.7%
U.S. Decennial Census; 2020 Census

=== 2010 census ===
As of the 2010 census, there were 23 people, 13 households, and 6 families living in the city. The population density was 104.5 inhabitants per square mile (40.3/km^{2}). There were 15 housing units at an average density of 68.2 per square mile (26.3/km^{2}). The racial makeup of the city was 100.0% White.

There were 13 households, of which 23.1% had children under the age of 18 living with them, 38.5% were married couples living together, 7.7% had a male householder with no wife present, and 53.8% were non-families. 53.8% of all households were made up of individuals, and 23.1% had someone living alone who was 65 years of age or older. The average household size was 1.77 and the average family size was 2.67.

The median age in the city was 46.5 years. 17.4% of residents were under the age of 18; 4.3% were between the ages of 18 and 24; 17.3% were from 25 to 44; 21.6% were from 45 to 64; and 39.1% were 65 years of age or older. The gender makeup of the city was 47.8% male and 52.2% female.

=== 2000 census ===
As of the 2000 census, there were 23 people, 9 households and 7 families living in the city. The population density was 105.2 inhabitants per square mile (40.6/km^{2}). There were 11 housing units at an average density of 50.3 per square mile (19.4/km^{2}). The racial makeup of the city was 100.00% White. The ancestry make up was 55.2% Czech, 31.0% Irish, 31.0% Norwegian, 20.7% Dutch, 6.9% Danish, 6.9% German, 6.9% French.

There were 9 households, of which 33.3% had children under the age of 18 living with them, 55.6% were married couples living together, 11.1% had a female householder with no husband present, and 22.2% were non-families. 22.2% of all households were made up of individuals, and 22.2% had someone living alone who was 65 years of age or older. The average household size was 2.56 and the average family size was 3.00.

30.4% of the population were under the age of 18, 26.1% from 25 to 44, 17.4% from 45 to 64, and 26.1% who were 65 years of age or older. The median age was 36 years. For every 100 females, there were 53.3 males. For every 100 females age 18 and over, there were 77.8 males.

The median household income was $20,833 and the median family income was $22,083. Males had a median income of $33,750 compared with $16,875 for females. The per capita income for the city was $9,176. There were no families and 10.3% of the population living below the poverty line, including no under eighteens and 42.9% of those over 64.

== History ==
The post office was established on January 12, 1885 and incorporated in 1895. The peak population was 228 in 1890. The other names it had were Eden and Kelner.

It was originally EDEN, a pioneer settlement founded in 1882 in the NE 1/4 sec. 23-155-55, Eden Twp. It failed to develop, but in 1884 a Great Northern Railroad Station was built there, and a farm post office called KELNER was established at the site. The following year, on January 12, 1885, it was renamed CONWAY when postmaster Norman Kelner adopted the new name. A farm post office named Conway, about two miles to the north, had operated for twenty-seven days in late 1884, and may have had some influence in the naming of the station. The village incorporated in 1895 and reached a peak population of 228 in 1890, with a decline to just 33 in 1980. The elevation is 993, and the Zip Code is 58232. Since October 27, 1961, the post office has been a rural branch of Fordville. Lloyd Bennett Omdahl, a former Tax Commissioner and ND Lt. Governor (1987) was born here in 1931. Kelner is an erroneous spelling.
