= Saint Andrews Township, Walsh County, North Dakota =

Saint Andrews Township
- Township
- Interactive map of Saint Andrews Township
- Coordinates: 48°29′55″N 97°12′38″W
- Country: United States
- State: North Dakota
- County: Walsh County

Area
  - Total: 36.800 sq mi (95.312 km^{2})
  - Land: 36.300 sq mi (94.017 km^{2})
  - Water: 0.500 sq mi (1.295 km^{2})

Population
  - Total: 55
- Time zone: UTC-6 (CST)
  - Summer (DST): UTC-5 (CDT)
- GNIS feature ID: 1036543

Saint Andrews Township is a township in Walsh County, North Dakota, United States.

== See also ==
- Walsh County, North Dakota
