= Prairie Centre Township, Walsh County, North Dakota =

Coordinates: 48.3256°N 97.5789°W

Prairie Centre Township
- Township
- Interactive map of Prairie Centre Township
- Country: United States
- State: North Dakota
- County: Walsh County

Area
  - Total: 36.100 sq mi (93.499 km^{2})
  - Land: 36.100 sq mi (93.499 km^{2})
  - Water: 0 sq mi (0 km^{2})

Population
  - Total: 111
- Time zone: UTC-6 (CST)
  - Summer (DST): UTC-5 (CDT)

Prairie Centre Township is a township in Walsh County, North Dakota, United States.

== See also ==
- Walsh County, North Dakota
