= Perth Township, Walsh County, North Dakota =

Civil township in North Dakota, U.S.

Perth Township is a civil township in Walsh County, North Dakota, United States. The population was 63 at the 2000 census.

It is located at 48°13′40″N 98°5′13.2″W.

The township was named after Perth, Scotland.
