= North Dakota Highway 44 =

State highway in North Dakota, U.S.

North Dakota Highway 44

Route information
- Maintained by NDDOT
- Length: 3.449 mi (5.551 km)
- Existed: 1926–present

Major junctions
- South end: I-29 south of Drayton
- North end: ND 66 in Drayton

Location
- Country: United States
- State: North Dakota
- Counties: Pembina, Walsh

Highway system
- North Dakota State Highway System; Interstate; US; State
| ← ND 43 | → ND 45 |

North Dakota Highway 44 (ND 44) is a 3.449-mile-long (5.551 km) north–south state highway in the U.S. state of North Dakota. ND 44's southern terminus is at Interstate 29 (I 29) south of Drayton, and the northern terminus is at ND 66 in Drayton.

== Major intersections ==
| County | Location | mi | km | Destinations | Notes |
|---|---|---|---|---|---|
| Walsh | | 0.000 | 0.000 | I-29 – Winnipeg, Grand Forks | Southern terminus, I-29 exit 184 |
| Pembina | Drayton | 3.449 | 5.551 | ND 66 – MN 11, I-29 | Northern terminus |
1.000 mi = 1.609 km; 1.000 km = 0.621 mi
