= Cleveland Township, Walsh County, North Dakota =

Coordinates: 48.2322°N 97.9572°W

Cleveland Township
- Township
- Interactive map of Cleveland Township
- Country: United States
- State: North Dakota
- County: Walsh County

Area
  - Total: 35.900 sq mi (92.981 km^{2})
  - Land: 35.700 sq mi (92.463 km^{2})
  - Water: 0.200 sq mi (0.518 km^{2})

Population
  - Total: 99
- Time zone: UTC-6 (CST)
  - Summer (DST): UTC-5 (CDT)

Cleveland Township is a township in Walsh County, North Dakota, United States. 53.5% (53) of the population are male, and the other 46.5% (46) are female.

== See also ==
- Walsh County, North Dakota
