= Eden Township, Walsh County, North Dakota =

Coordinates: 48.2383°N 97.7089°W

Eden Township
- Township
- Interactive map of Eden Township
- Country: United States
- State: North Dakota
- County: Walsh County

Area
  - Total: 35.800 sq mi (92.722 km^{2})
  - Land: 35.800 sq mi (92.722 km^{2})
  - Water: 0 sq mi (0 km^{2})

Population
  - Total: 56
- Time zone: UTC-6 (CST)
  - Summer (DST): UTC-5 (CDT)

Eden Township is a township in Walsh County, North Dakota, United States.

== See also ==
- Walsh County, North Dakota
