= Walsh Centre Township, Walsh County, North Dakota =

Coordinates: 48.3253°N 97.4486°W

Walsh Centre Township
- Township
- Interactive map of Walsh Centre Township
- Country: United States
- State: North Dakota
- County: Walsh County

Area
  - Total: 36.300 sq mi (94.017 km^{2})
  - Land: 36.300 sq mi (94.017 km^{2})
  - Water: 0 sq mi (0 km^{2})

Population
  - Total: 156
- Time zone: UTC-6 (CST)
  - Summer (DST): UTC-5 (CDT)

Walsh Centre Township is a township in Walsh County, North Dakota, United States.

== See also ==
- Walsh County, North Dakota
