= Ardoch Township, Walsh County, North Dakota =

Coordinates: 48.2422°N 97.3194°W

Ardoch Township
- Township
- Interactive map of Ardoch Township
- Country: United States
- State: North Dakota
- County: Walsh County

Area
  - Total: 35.400 sq mi (91.686 km^{2})
  - Land: 34.00 sq mi (88.06 km^{2})
  - Water: 1.400 sq mi (3.626 km^{2})

Population
  - Total: 93
- Time zone: UTC-6 (CST)
  - Summer (DST): UTC-5 (CDT)

Ardoch Township is a township in Walsh County, North Dakota, United States. 50.5% (47) of the population are male, and the other 49.5% (46) are female.

== See also ==
- Walsh County, North Dakota
