= George H. Walsh =

American politician

George H. Walsh (November 24, 1845 – April 2, 1913) was a Canadian born, American newspaper editor and publisher from Grand Forks, North Dakota. He served on the council of the Dakota Territory and was instrumental in the founding of the University of North Dakota.

Born in Montreal, Canada East, Walsh was one of the earliest settlers of Grand Forks. He was selected as a member of the Territorial Council, serving from 1879 until 1889. The council, in turn, elected him their president from 1879 until 1881. He also served in the North Dakota House of Representatives and as speaker during the 1893 session.

== Honours ==
In 1881, when the territorial legislature authorized a new county north of Grand Forks, they named it Walsh County in his honour. Walsh Hall at the University of North Dakota bears his name.
