= Adams Township, Walsh County, North Dakota =

Coordinates: 48°24′21″N 98°06′42″W

Adams Township is a township in Walsh County, North Dakota, United States. It has a population of 49, in 11 housing units.
