= Kinloss Township, Walsh County, North Dakota =

Coordinates: 48.5044°N 98.2667°W

Kinloss Township
- Township
- Interactive map of Kinloss Township
- Country: United States
- State: North Dakota
- County: Walsh County

Area
  - Total: 35.800 sq mi (92.722 km^{2})
  - Land: 35.400 sq mi (91.686 km^{2})
  - Water: 0.400 sq mi (1.036 km^{2})

Population
  - Total: 56
- Time zone: UTC-6 (CST)
  - Summer (DST): UTC-5 (CDT)

Kinloss Township is a township in Walsh County, North Dakota, United States.

== See also ==
- Walsh County, North Dakota
