= Silvesta Township, Walsh County, North Dakota =

Coordinates: 48.4925°N 98.1117°W

Silvesta Township
- Township
- Interactive map of Silvesta Township
- Country: United States
- State: North Dakota
- County: Walsh County

Area
  - Total: 35.900 sq mi (92.981 km^{2})
  - Land: 35.200 sq mi (91.168 km^{2})
  - Water: 0.700 sq mi (1.813 km^{2})

Population
  - Total: 56
- Time zone: UTC-6 (CST)
  - Summer (DST): UTC-5 (CDT)

Silvesta Township is a township in Walsh County, North Dakota, United States.

== See also ==
- Walsh County, North Dakota
