= Auburn, North Dakota =

- Census-designated place & Unincorporated community
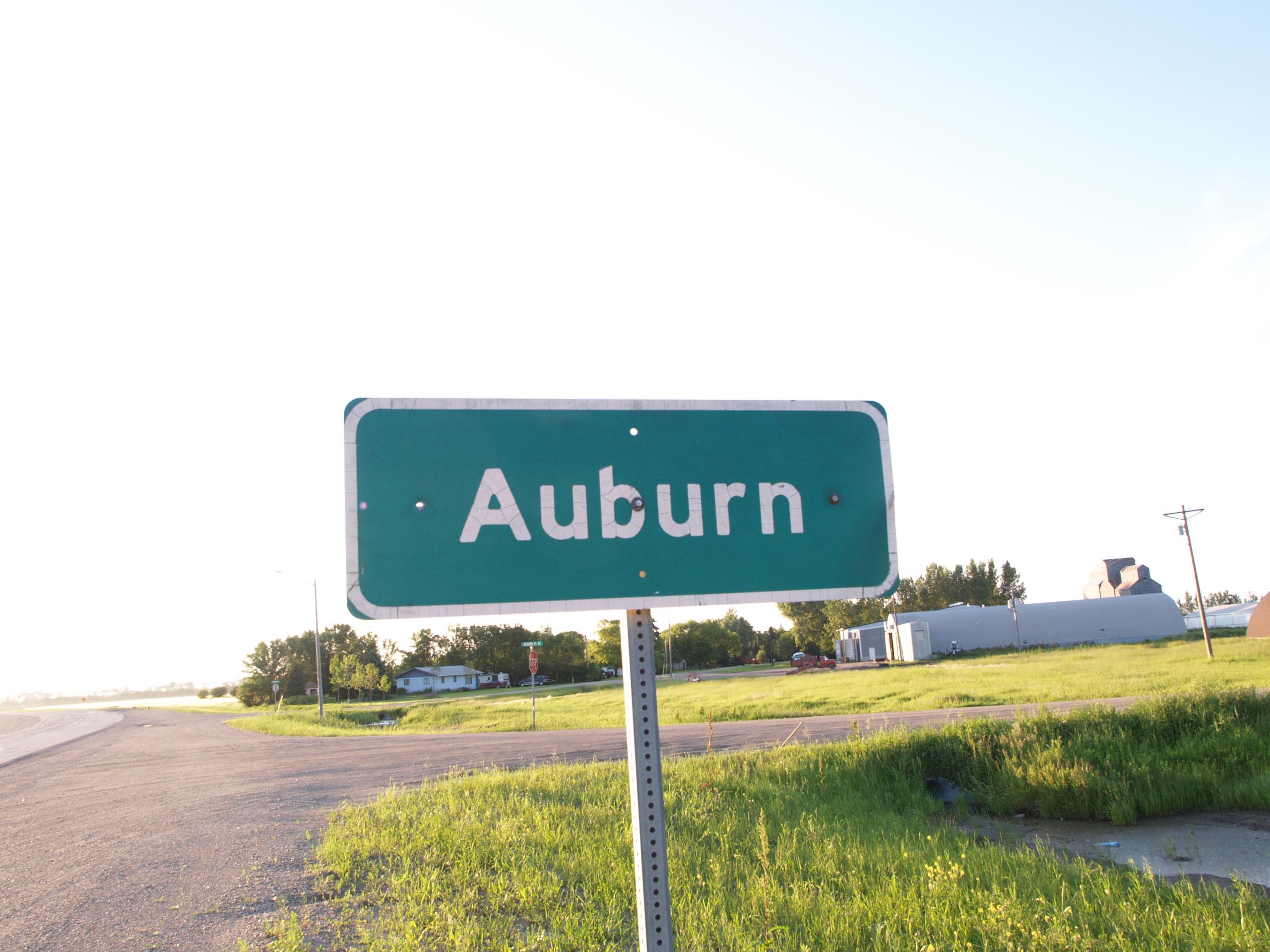
- Sign for Auburn

- Location within North Dakota
- Coordinates: 48.506563°N 97.436844°W
- Country: United States
- State: North Dakota
- County: Walsh

Area
  - Total: 1.005 sq mi (2.603 km^{2})
  - Land: 1.005 sq mi (2.603 km^{2})
  - Water: 0 sq mi (0.000 km^{2})
- Elevation: 843 ft (257 m)

Population (2020)
  - Total: 31
  - Estimate (2023): 13
  - Density: 30.8/sq mi (11.91/km^{2})
- Time zone: UTC–6 (Central (CST))
  - Summer (DST): UTC–5 (CDT)
- ZIP Code: 58237
- Area code: 701
- FIPS code: 38-03740
- GNIS feature ID: 2584335

Auburn is a census-designated place and unincorporated community in Walsh County, North Dakota, United States. The population was 31 at the 2020 census, and was estimated to be 13 in 2023.

== History ==
A post office called Auburn was established in 1883 and remained in operation until 1943. With the construction of the railroad, business activity shifted to nearby Grafton, and the town's population dwindled.

== Geography ==
According to the United States Census Bureau, the CDP has a total area of 1.005 square miles (2.60 km^{2}), all land.

== Demographics ==
Historical population
| Census | Pop. | Note | %± |
|---|---|---|---|
| 2010 | 48 | | — |
| 2020 | 31 | | −35.4% |
| 2023 (est.) | 13 | ▼ | −58.1% |
U.S. Decennial Census; 2020 Census

=== 2020 census ===
As of the 2020 census, there were 31 people, 12 households, and 10 families residing in the CDP. The population density was 30.85 inhabitants per square mile (11.9/km^{2}). There were 18 housing units at an average density of 17.91 per square mile (6.9/km^{2}). The racial makeup of the CDP was 96.77% White, 0.00% African American, 0.00% Native American, 0.00% Asian, 0.00% Pacific Islander, 3.23% from some other races and 0.00% from two or more races. Hispanic or Latino people of any race were 0.00% of the population.

=== 2010 census ===
As of the census of 2010, there were 48 people, 17 households, and 11 families residing in the CDP. The population density was 47.8 inhabitants per square mile (18.5/km^{2}). There were 21 housing units at an average density of 20.9 per square mile (8.1/km^{2}). The racial makeup of the CDP was 100.00% White, 0.00% African American, 0.00% Native American, 0.00% Asian, 0.00% Pacific Islander, 0.00% from some other races and 0.00% from two or more races. Hispanic or Latino people of any race were 6.25% of the population.

There were 17 households, of which 23.5% had children under the age of 18 living with them, 47.1% were married couples living together, 11.8% had a female householder with no husband present, 5.9% had a male householder with no wife present, and 35.3% were non-families. 35.3% of all households were made up of individuals, and 11.8% had someone living alone who was 65 years of age or older. The average household size was 2.82 and the average family size was 3.73.

The median age in the CDP was 43.5 years. 27.1% of residents were under the age of 18; 10.4% were between the ages of 18 and 24; 12.5% were from 25 to 44; 33.3% were from 45 to 64; and 16.7% were 65 years of age or older. The gender makeup of the CDP was 58.3% male and 41.7% female.
