= Vernon Township, Walsh County, North Dakota =

Vernon Township
- Township
- Interactive map of Vernon Township
- Coordinates: 48°19′32″N 97°50′18″W
- Country: United States
- State: North Dakota
- County: Walsh County

Area
  - Total: 36.100 sq mi (93.499 km^{2})
  - Land: 36.100 sq mi (93.499 km^{2})
  - Water: 0 sq mi (0 km^{2})
- Elevation: 1,165 ft (355 m)

Population
  - Total: 92
- Time zone: UTC-6 (CST)
  - Summer (DST): UTC-5 (CDT)
- GNIS feature ID: 1036529

Vernon Township is a township in Walsh County, North Dakota, United States.
