= Harriston Township, Walsh County, North Dakota =

Coordinates: 48.3264°N 97.3172°W

Harriston Township
- Township
- Interactive map of Harriston Township
- Country: United States
- State: North Dakota
- County: Walsh County

Area
  - Total: 34.500 sq mi (89.355 km^{2})
  - Land: 34.500 sq mi (89.355 km^{2})
  - Water: 0 sq mi (0 km^{2})

Population
  - Total: 162
- Time zone: UTC-6 (CST)
  - Summer (DST): UTC-5 (CDT)

Harriston Township is a township in Walsh County, North Dakota, United States.

== See also ==
- Walsh County, North Dakota
