= Lampton Township, Walsh County, North Dakota =

Coordinates: 48.5069°N 97.8511°W

Lampton Township
- Township
- Interactive map of Lampton Township
- Country: United States
- State: North Dakota
- County: Walsh County

Area
  - Total: 35.600 sq mi (92.204 km^{2})
  - Land: 35.600 sq mi (92.204 km^{2})
  - Water: 0 sq mi (0 km^{2})

Population
  - Total: 107
- Time zone: UTC-6 (CST)
  - Summer (DST): UTC-5 (CDT)

Lampton Township is a township in Walsh County, North Dakota, United States.

== See also ==
- Walsh County, North Dakota
