= Odalen Lutherske Kirke =

Historic church in North Dakota, United States

- Formerly listed on the U.S. National Register of Historic Places
- Nearest city: Edinburg, North Dakota
- Built: 1896
- Architectural style: Greek Revival
- NRHP reference No.: 05001517

Significant dates
- Added to NRHP: January 1, 2006
- Removed from NRHP: November 28, 2007

The Odalen Lutherske Kirke, also known as the Odalen Lutheran Church or simply the Odalen Church, was an historic Norwegian-American Lutheran church located in Tiber Township, in Walsh County near Edinburg, North Dakota.

Odalen Lutherske Kirke is significant for its association with the Norwegian immigrants from the traditional district of Odal in the county of Hedmark in eastern Norway. Norwegian immigrants settled this area in rural Walsh County, and established the congregation in 1884. The church was built in 1896 in the Greek Revival style. It bore a striking resemblance to the Ullern Church built 29 years earlier in Odal.

It was added to the National Register of Historic Places on January 11, 2006. It burned to ground on June 21, 2007, and was delisted on November 28, 2007. It was the last public building in Tiber Township.

On July 30, 2008, an 80-foot cross was erected at the site to memorialize the church. Plans are ongoing for a further memorial.
