= Medford Township, Walsh County, North Dakota =

Coordinates: 48.2389°N 97.8397°W

Medford Township
- Township
- Interactive map of Medford Township
- Country: United States
- State: North Dakota
- County: Walsh County

Area
  - Total: 34.900 sq mi (90.391 km^{2})
  - Land: 34.900 sq mi (90.391 km^{2})
  - Water: 0 sq mi (0 km^{2})

Population
  - Total: 69
- Time zone: UTC-6 (CST)
  - Summer (DST): UTC-5 (CDT)

Medford Township is a township in Walsh County, North Dakota, United States.

== See also ==
- Walsh County, North Dakota
