= Oakwood Township, Walsh County, North Dakota =

Coordinates: 48.4122°N 97.3392°W

Oakwood Township
- Township
- Interactive map of Oakwood Township
- Country: United States
- State: North Dakota
- County: Walsh County

Area
  - Total: 33.500 sq mi (86.765 km^{2})
  - Land: 33.500 sq mi (86.765 km^{2})
  - Water: 0 sq mi (0 km^{2})

Population
  - Total: 300
- Time zone: UTC-6 (CST)
  - Summer (DST): UTC-5 (CDT)

Oakwood Township is a township in Walsh County, North Dakota, United States. Its population had around 300 residents.

== See also ==
- Walsh County, North Dakota
