= Voss, North Dakota =

- Unincorporated community
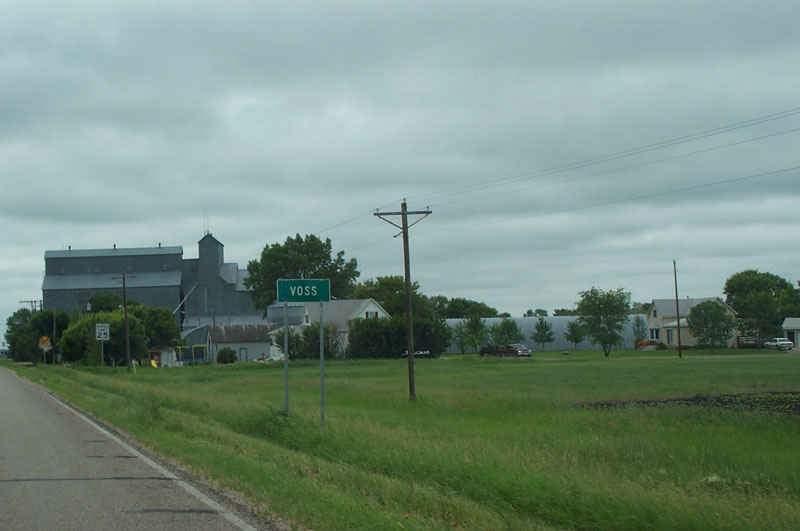
- Sign for Voss

- Location within North Dakota Location within the United States
- Coordinates: 48°17′47″N 97°27′19″W
- Country: United States
- State: North Dakota
- County: Walsh
- Elevation: 840 ft (260 m)

Population (2016)
  - Total: 18
- Time zone: UTC-6 (Central (CST))
  - Summer (DST): UTC-5 (CDT)
- Area code: 701
- GNIS feature ID: 1032654

Voss is an unincorporated community in Walsh County, North Dakota, United States. Voss is 3.9 miles (6.3 km) west of Minto.
