= Lankin, North Dakota =

- City
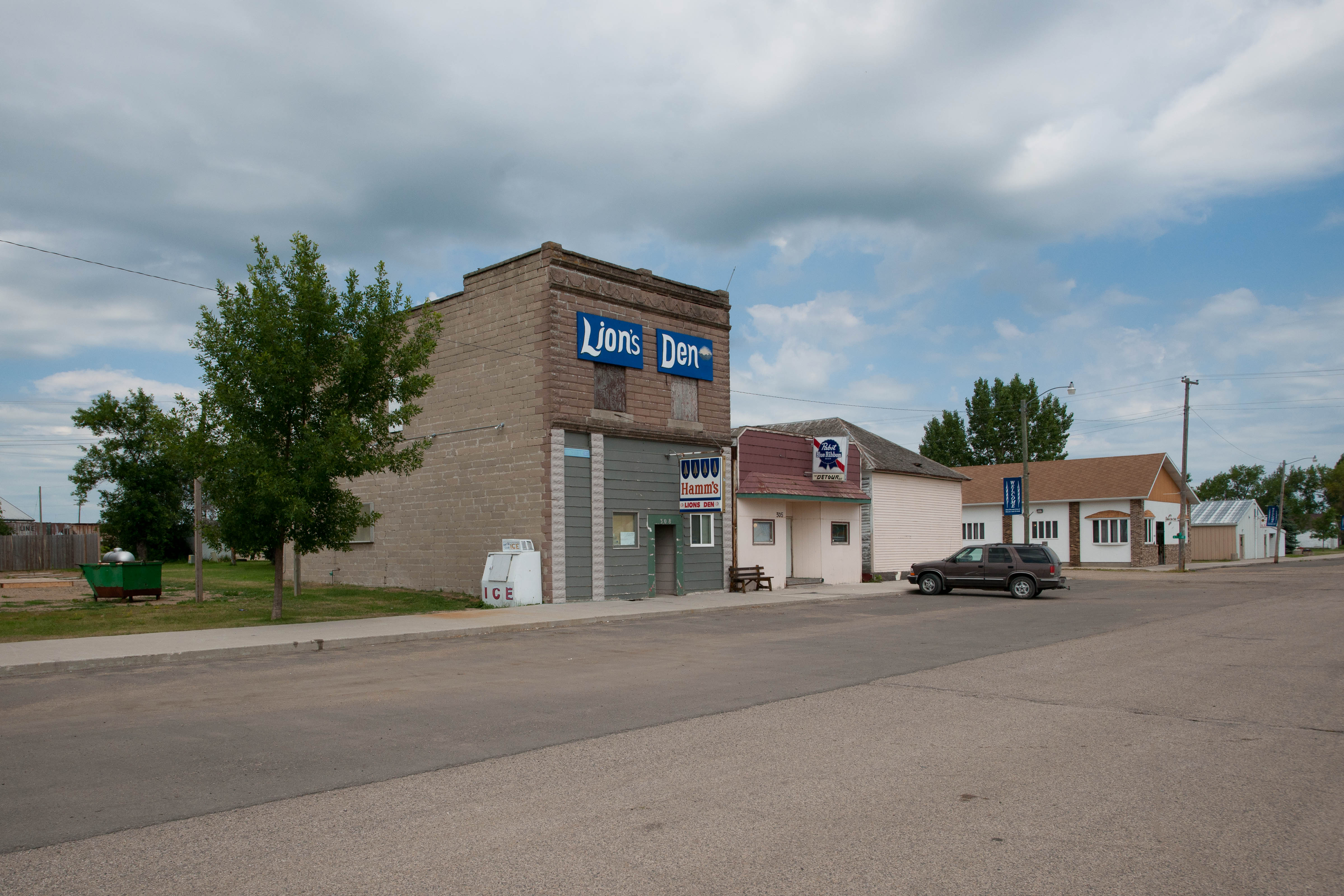
- Lions Den - Lankin, North Dakota
- Nickname: Madysen's Town
- Location of Lankin, North Dakota
- Coordinates: 48°18′53″N 97°55′13″W
- Country: United States
- State: North Dakota
- County: Walsh
- Founded: 1905

Area
  - Total: 0.29 sq mi (0.74 km^{2})
  - Land: 0.29 sq mi (0.74 km^{2})
  - Water: 0 sq mi (0.00 km^{2})
- Elevation: 1,332 ft (406 m)

Population (2020)
  - Total: 102
  - Estimate (2023): 103
  - Density: 355.9/sq mi (137.41/km^{2})
- Time zone: UTC–6 (Central (CST))
  - Summer (DST): UTC–5 (CDT)
- ZIP Code: 58250
- Area code: 701
- FIPS code: 38-44860
- GNIS feature ID: 1036118

Lankin is a city in Walsh County, North Dakota, United States. The population was 102 at the 2020 census. Lankin was founded in 1905.

== History ==
Lankin was laid out in 1905 when the railroad was extended to that point. A post office has been in operation at Lankin since 1905. John Lankin, the first postmaster, gave the city his name.

== Geography ==
According to the United States Census Bureau, the city has a total area of 0.29 square miles (0.75 km^{2}), all land.

== Demographics ==
Historical population
Census	Pop.	Note	%±
1910	341		—
1920	334		−2.1%
1930	267		−20.1%
1940	283		6.0%
1950	287		1.4%
1960	303		5.6%
1970	221		−27.1%
1980	175		−20.8%
1990	152		−13.1%
2000	131		−13.8%
2010	98		−25.2%
2020	102		4.1%
2023 (est.)	103		1.0%
U.S. Decennial Census; 2020 Census

=== 2010 census ===
As of the 2010 census, there were 98 people, 53 households, and 26 families living in the city. The population density was 280.0 inhabitants per square mile (108.1/km^{2}). There were 72 housing units at an average density of 205.7 per square mile (79.4/km^{2}). The racial makeup of the city was 93.9% White, 2.0% Native American, 1.0% Asian, and 3.1% from two or more races. Hispanic or Latino of any race were 1.0% of the population.

There were 53 households, of which 13.2% had children under the age of 18 living with them, 45.3% were married couples living together, 1.9% had a female householder with no husband present, 1.9% had a male householder with no wife present, and 50.9% were non-families. 47.2% of all households were made up of individuals, and 24.6% had someone living alone who was 65 years of age or older. The average household size was 1.85 and the average family size was 2.58.

The median age in the city was 55.5 years. 15.3% of residents were under the age of 18; 3.1% were between the ages of 18 and 24; 16.4% were from 25 to 44; 27.5% were from 45 to 64; and 37.8% were 65 years of age or older. The gender makeup of the city was 52.0% male and 48.0% female.

=== 2000 census ===
As of the 2000 census, there were 131 people, 64 households, and 38 families living in the city. The population density was 375.5 inhabitants per square mile (145.0/km^{2}). There were 83 housing units at an average density of 237.9 per square mile (91.9/km^{2}). The racial makeup of the city was 96.95% White, 2.29% Native American, and 0.76% from two or more races.

There were 64 households, out of which 18.8% had children under the age of 18 living with them, 50.0% were married couples living together, 6.3% had a female householder with no husband present, and 40.6% were non-families. 40.6% of all households were made up of individuals, and 21.9% had someone living alone who was 65 years of age or older. The average household size was 2.05 and the average family size was 2.71.

In the city, the population was spread out, with 19.8% under the age of 18, 3.8% from 18 to 24, 18.3% from 25 to 44, 20.6% from 45 to 64, and 37.4% who were 65 years of age or older. The median age was 53 years. For every 100 females, there were 92.6 males. For every 100 females age 18 and over, there were 94.4 males.

The median income for a household in the city was $27,679, and the median income for a family was $40,313. Males had a median income of $28,125 versus $18,125 for females. The per capita income for the city was $16,016. There were no families and 5.0% of the population living below the poverty line, including no under eighteens and 7.7% of those over.
