= Kensington Township, Walsh County, North Dakota =

Coordinates: 48.4161°N 97.7217°W

Kensington Township
- Township
- Interactive map of Kensington Township
- Country: United States
- State: North Dakota
- County: Walsh County

Area
  - Total: 33.900 sq mi (87.801 km^{2})
  - Land: 33.800 sq mi (87.542 km^{2})
  - Water: 0.100 sq mi (0.259 km^{2})

Population
  - Total: 262
- Time zone: UTC-6 (CST)
  - Summer (DST): UTC-5 (CDT)

Kensington Township is a township in Walsh County, North Dakota, United States.

== See also ==
- Walsh County, North Dakota
