= North Trinity Church =

Historic church in North Dakota, United States

- Nordre Trefoldegheds Menigheds
- Formerly listed on the U.S. National Register of Historic Places
- Location within North Dakota Location within the United States
- Nearest city: Nash, North Dakota
- Coordinates: 48°27′56″N 97°33′28″W
- Area: 2.5 acres (1.0 ha)
- Built: 1893
- Built by: Staven, Knut
- Architectural style: Gothic Revival
- NRHP reference No.: 04000058

Significant dates
- Added to NRHP: February 20, 2004
- Removed from NRHP: August 7, 2026

The North Trinity Church near Nash, North Dakota is a church that was built in 1893. It has also been known as Nordre Trefoldegheds Menigheds, as The Swede Church, and as North Trinity Lutheran Church. It includes Gothic Revival architecture. It was listed on the National Register of Historic Places in 2004 as "Nordre Trefoldegheds Menigheds".

It is a front-gabled building with a steeple. It was built by carpenter Knut Staven.
