= Dwight, North Dakota =

- City
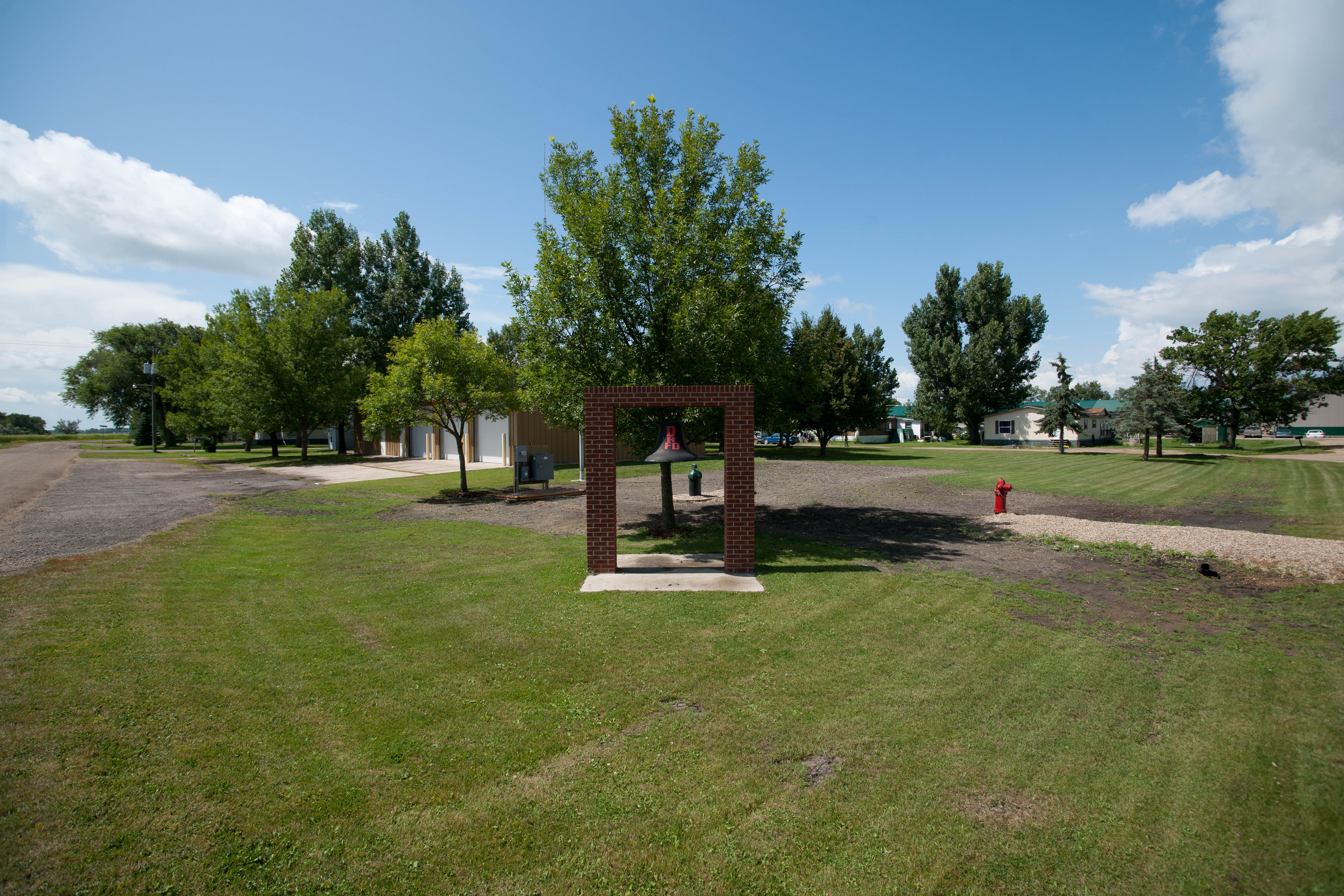
- Fire department bell in Dwight

- Location of Dwight in North Dakota
- Coordinates: 46°18′14″N 96°44′25″W
- Country: United States
- State: North Dakota
- County: Richland
- Founded: 1881

Area
  - Total: 0.19 sq mi (0.50 km^{2})
  - Land: 0.19 sq mi (0.50 km^{2})
  - Water: 0 sq mi (0.00 km^{2})
- Elevation: 955 ft (291 m)

Population (2020)
  - Total: 80
  - Estimate (2022): 79
  - Density: 412.8/sq mi (159.39/km^{2})
- Time zone: UTC-6 (Central (CST))
  - Summer (DST): UTC-5 (CDT)
- ZIP code: 58075
- Area code: 701
- FIPS code: 38-21220
- GNIS feature ID: 1036001

Dwight is a city in Richland County, North Dakota, United States. The population was 80 at the 2020 census. Dwight was founded in 1881. It is part of the Wahpeton, ND–MN Micropolitan Statistical Area.

== History ==
Dwight was named for Jeremiah W. Dwight, the owner of the Dwight Farm and Land Company which ran a 27,000 acre bonanza farm, organized in 1879, in the area. John Miller, North Dakota's first governor, lived in Dwight and was the superintendent of the Dwight bonanza farm.

== Geography ==
According to the United States Census Bureau, the city has a total area of 0.20 square miles (0.52 km^{2}), all land.

== Demographics ==
Historical population
Census	Pop.	Note	%±
1920	139		—
1930	104		−25.2%
1940	168		61.5%
1950	129		−23.2%
1960	101		−21.7%
1970	93		−7.9%
1980	72		−22.6%
1990	83		15.3%
2000	75		−9.6%
2010	82		9.3%
2020	80		−2.4%
2022 (est.)	79		−1.2%
U.S. Decennial Census; 2020 Census

=== 2010 census ===
As of the census of 2010, there were 82 people in 32 households, including 17 families, in the city. The population density was 410.0 inhabitants per square mile (158.3/km^{2}). There were 34 housing units at an average density of 170.0 per square mile (65.6/km^{2}). The racial makup of the city was 100.0% White.

Of the 32 households 46.9% had children under the age of 18 living with them, 40.6% were married couples living together, 9.4% had a female householder with no husband present, 3.1% had a male householder with no wife present, and 46.9% were non-families. 40.6% of households were one person and 15.7% were one person aged 65 or older. The average household size was 2.56 and the average family size was 3.59.

The median age was 32 years. 32.9% of residents were under the age of 18; 2.4% were between the ages of 18 and 24; 31.7% were from 25 to 44; 23.2% were from 45 to 64; and 9.8% were 65 or older. The gender makeup of the city was 50.0% male and 50.0% female.

=== 2000 census ===
As of the census of 2000, there were 75 people in 33 households, including 17 families, in the city. The population density was 377.7 inhabitants per square mile (145.8/km^{2}). There were 36 housing units at an average density of 181.3 per square mile (70.0/km^{2}). The racial makup of the city was 98.67% White, and 1.33% from two or more races.

Of the 33 households 33.3% had children under the age of 18 living with them, 39.4% were married couples living together, 6.1% had a female householder with no husband present, and 45.5% were non-families. 45.5% of households were one person and 21.2% were one person aged 65 or older. The average household size was 2.27 and the average family size was 3.22.

The age distribution was 29.3% under the age of 18, 12.0% from 18 to 24, 25.3% from 25 to 44, 16.0% from 45 to 64, and 17.3% 65 or older. The median age was 29 years. For every 100 females, there were 114.3 males. For every 100 females age 18 and over, there were 103.8 males.

The median household income was $40,625 and the median family income was $53,125. Males had a median income of $40,625 versus $31,250 for females. The per capita income for the city was $17,543. There were no families and 4.2% of the population living below the poverty line, including no under eighteens and 27.3% of those over 64.

== Notable person ==
- John Miller, first governor of the State of North Dakota
