= Gunlogson Farmstead Historic Site =

- U.S. National Register of Historic Places
- Location within North Dakota Location within the United States
- Nearest city: Cavalier, North Dakota
- Coordinates: 48°46′26″N 97°44′17″W
- Area: 4.2 acres (1.7 ha)
- Built: 1882
- Built by: Gunnlaugson, Eggert; Gunnlogson, Loa
- NRHP reference No.: 08000232
- Added to NRHP: September 18, 2008

The Gunlogson Farmstead Historic Site near Cavalier, North Dakota is a farm that was developed in 1882. It was listed on the National Register of Historic Places in 2008. The listing included four contributing buildings on 4.2 acres (1.7 ha).
