= O'Connor House (St. Thomas, North Dakota) =

Historic house in North Dakota, United States

- U.S. National Register of Historic Places
- Location within North Dakota Location within the United States
- Location: Off US 81, St. Thomas, North Dakota
- Coordinates: 48°36′57″N 97°26′54″W
- Area: less than one acre
- Built: 1898
- Architect: Flegel, A.L.
- Architectural style: Queen Anne
- NRHP reference No.: 80004544
- Added to NRHP: July 3, 1980

The O'Connor House located near St. Thomas, North Dakota is a Queen Anne style residence built in 1898.

It was added on the National Register of Historic Places in 1990.

It was the home of Archie M. O'Connor and his family. O'Connor was one of the area's earliest settlers, arriving in 1881. He operated a grain elevator business and served as Pembina County sheriff from1888–92.
