= Vesta Township, Walsh County, North Dakota =

Coordinates: 48.4097°N 97.9819°W

Vesta Township
- Township
- Interactive map of Vesta Township
- Country: United States
- State: North Dakota
- County: Walsh County

Area
  - Total: 36.00 sq mi (93.24 km^{2})
  - Land: 35.800 sq mi (92.722 km^{2})
  - Water: 0.200 sq mi (0.518 km^{2})

Population
  - Total: 48
- Time zone: UTC-6 (CST)
  - Summer (DST): UTC-5 (CDT)

Vesta Township is a township in Walsh County, North Dakota, United States.

== See also ==
- Walsh County, North Dakota
