= Dundee Township, Walsh County, North Dakota =

Coordinates: 48.4997°N 97.7314°W

Dundee Township
- Township
- Interactive map of Dundee Township
- Country: United States
- State: North Dakota
- County: Walsh County

Area
  - Total: 36.00 sq mi (93.24 km^{2})
  - Land: 36.00 sq mi (93.24 km^{2})
  - Water: 0 sq mi (0 km^{2})

Population
  - Total: 107
- Time zone: UTC-6 (CST)
  - Summer (DST): UTC-5 (CDT)

Dundee Township is a township in Walsh County, North Dakota, United States. 57.9% (62) of the population are male, and the other 42.1% (45) are female.
