= Walshville Township, Walsh County, North Dakota =

Coordinates: 48.2456°N 97.1936°W

Walshville Township
- Township
- Interactive map of Walshville Township
- Country: United States
- State: North Dakota
- County: Walsh County

Area
  - Total: 33.600 sq mi (87.024 km^{2})
  - Land: 33.200 sq mi (85.988 km^{2})
  - Water: 0.400 sq mi (1.036 km^{2})

Population
  - Total: 142
- Time zone: UTC-6 (CST)
  - Summer (DST): UTC-5 (CDT)

Walshville Township is a township in Walsh County, North Dakota, United States.

== See also ==
- Walsh County, North Dakota
