= Farmington Township, Walsh County, North Dakota =

Coordinates: 48.4994°N 97.4697°W

Farmington Township
- Township
- Interactive map of Farmington Township
- Country: United States
- State: North Dakota
- County: Walsh County

Area
  - Total: 36.200 sq mi (93.758 km^{2})
  - Land: 36.200 sq mi (93.758 km^{2})
  - Water: 0 sq mi (0 km^{2}) 0%

Population
  - Total: 177
- Time zone: UTC-6 (CST)
  - Summer (DST): UTC-5 (CDT)

Farmington Township is a township in Walsh County, North Dakota, United States. 55.4% (98) of the population are male, and the other 44.6% (79) are female. It contains the census-designated place of Nash.

== See also ==
- Walsh County, North Dakota
