= Fertile Township, Walsh County, North Dakota =

Coordinates: 48.4128°N 97.6011°W

Fertile Township
- Township
- Interactive map of Fertile Township
- Country: United States
- State: North Dakota
- County: Walsh County

Area
  - Total: 36.100 sq mi (93.499 km^{2})
  - Land: 36.100 sq mi (93.499 km^{2})
  - Water: 0 sq mi (0 km^{2}) 0%

Population
  - Total: 246
- Time zone: UTC-6 (CST)
  - Summer (DST): UTC-5 (CDT)

Fertile Township is a township in Walsh County, North Dakota, United States. 51.6% (127) of the population are male, and the other 48.4% (119) are female.

== See also ==
- Walsh County, North Dakota
