= Glenwood Township, Schuyler County, Missouri =

Township in the American state of Missouri

Coordinates: 40.5078°N 92.6208°W

Glenwood Township is an inactive township in Schuyler County, in the U.S. state of Missouri.

Glenwood Township was erected in 1858.
