= Dewey Township, Walsh County, North Dakota =

Coordinates: 48.4203°N 98.2642°W

Dewey Township
- Township
- Interactive map of Dewey Township
- Country: United States
- State: North Dakota
- County: Walsh County

Area
  - Total: 36.100 sq mi (93.499 km^{2})
  - Land: 35.600 sq mi (92.204 km^{2})
  - Water: 0.500 sq mi (1.295 km^{2})

Population
  - Total: 11
- Time zone: UTC-6 (CST)
  - Summer (DST): UTC-5 (CDT)

Dewey Township is a township in Walsh County, North Dakota, United States. 64% (7) of the population are male, and the other 36% (4) are female.

== See also ==
- Walsh County, North Dakota
