= Glenwood Township, Walsh County, North Dakota =

Coordinates: 48.4992°N 97.6006°W

Glenwood Township
- Township
- Interactive map of Glenwood Township
- Country: United States
- State: North Dakota
- County: Walsh County

Area
  - Total: 35.700 sq mi (92.463 km^{2})
  - Land: 35.700 sq mi (92.463 km^{2})
  - Water: 0 sq mi (0 km^{2})

Population
  - Total: 213
- Time zone: UTC-6 (CST)
  - Summer (DST): UTC-5 (CDT)

Glenwood Township is a township in Walsh County, North Dakota, United States. 53.5% (114) of the population are male, and the other 46.5% (99) are female.

== See also ==
- Walsh County, North Dakota
