= Argusville, North Dakota =

- City
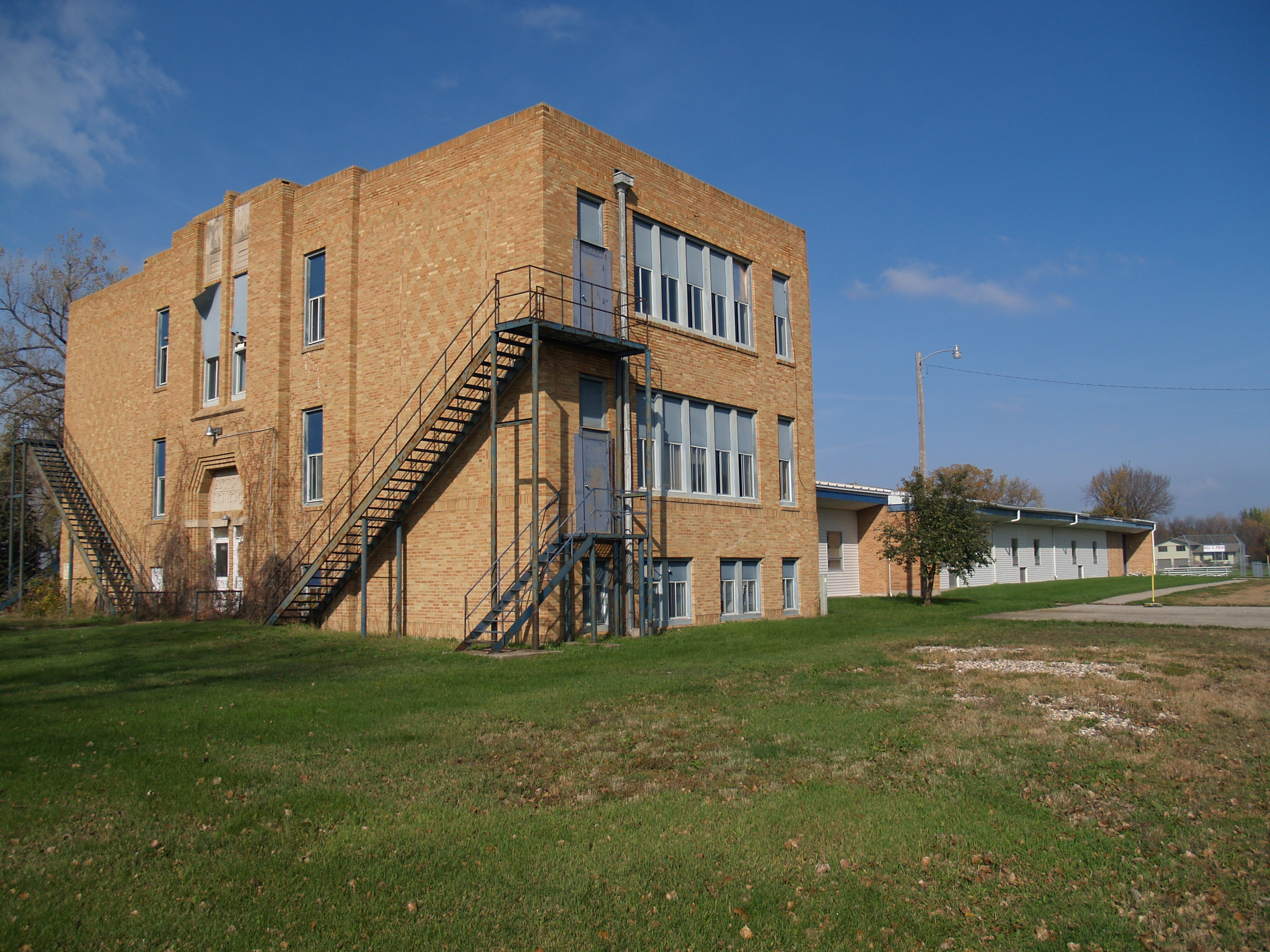
- Former Argusville High School, demolished in 2023
- Interactive map of Argusville, North Dakota
- Location within North Dakota
- Coordinates: 47.0501°N 96.9431°W
- Country: United States
- State: North Dakota
- County: Cass
- Founded: 1881

Government
  - Mayor: Darren Wetzel

Area
  - Total: 4.002 sq mi (10.366 km^{2})
  - Land: 4.002 sq mi (10.366 km^{2})
  - Water: 0 sq mi (0.000 km^{2}) 0.00%
- Elevation: 890 ft (270 m)

Population (2020)
  - Total: 480
  - Estimate (2025): 474
  - Density: 120/sq mi (46/km^{2})
- Time zone: UTC–6 (Central (CST))
  - Summer (DST): UTC–5 (CDT)
- ZIP Code: 58005
- Area code: 701
- FIPS code: 38-03020
- GNIS feature ID: 1035914
- Website: cityofargusville.com

Argusville is a city in Cass County, North Dakota, United States. The population was 480 as of the 2020 census, and was estimated at 474 in 2025. Increasing from 147 two decades earlier due to a huge housing boom from 2004 to 2008.

== History ==
Argusville was founded in 1881, when the railroad was extended to that point. The city most likely derived its name from a local newspaper, the Daily Argus. A post office was established at Argusville in 1881, and remained in operation until 1982.

In 1890, Argusville was the site of one of North Dakota's deadliest tornadoes (then called an "inland hurricane") which killed seven people. Some locals claim that the town has never emotionally recovered.

== Geography ==
According to the United States Census Bureau, the city has a total area of 4.002 square miles (10.37 km^{2}), all land.

== Demographics ==
Historical population
| Census | Pop. | Note | %± |
|---|---|---|---|
| 1930 | 115 | | — |
| 1940 | 145 | | 26.1% |
| 1950 | 126 | | −13.1% |
| 1960 | 118 | | −6.3% |
| 1970 | 118 | | 0.0% |
| 1980 | 147 | | 24.6% |
| 1990 | 161 | | 9.5% |
| 2000 | 147 | | −8.7% |
| 2010 | 475 | | 223.1% |
| 2020 | 480 | | 1.1% |
| 2025 (est.) | 474 | | −1.2% |
U.S. Decennial Census; 2020 Census

=== 2020 census ===
As of the 2020 census, there were 480 people, 148 households, and 130 families residing in the city.

=== 2010 census ===
As of the 2010 census, there were 475 people, 151 households, and 128 families living in the city. The population density was 118.5 inhabitants per square mile (45.8/km^{2}). There were 152 housing units at an average density of 37.9 units per square mile (14.6 units/km^{2}). The racial makeup of the city was 97.9% White, 0.2% African American, 1.5% Native American, and 0.4% from two or more races.

There were 151 households, of which 58.9% had children under the age of 18 living with them, 76.8% were married couples living together, 4.0% had a female householder with no husband present, 4.0% had a male householder with no wife present, and 15.2% were non-families. 11.3% of all households were made up of individuals, and 3.3% had someone living alone who was 65 years of age or older. The average household size was 3.15 and the average family size was 3.42.

The median age in the city was 31.7 years. 38.7% of residents were under the age of 18; 3.7% were between the ages of 18 and 24; 38.1% were from 25 to 44; 15.1% were from 45 to 64; and 4.4% were 65 years of age or older. The gender makeup of the city was 53.3% male and 46.7% female.

=== 2000 census ===
As of the 2000 census, there were 147 people, 62 households, and 45 families living in the city, though the town had a housing boom from 2004 to 2009. The population density was 36.8 inhabitants per square mile (14.2/km^{2}). There were 65 housing units at an average density of 16.3 units per square mile (6.3 units/km^{2}). The racial makeup of the city was 100.00% White. Hispanic or Latino people of any race were 0.68% of the population.

There were 62 households, out of which 32.3% had children under the age of 18 living with them, 71.0% were married couples living together, 1.6% had a female householder with no husband present, and 27.4% were non-families. 21.0% of all households were made up of individuals, and 1.6% had someone living alone who was 65 years of age or older. The average household size was 2.37 and the average family size was 2.76.

In the city, the population was spread out, with 21.1% under the age of 18, 5.4% from 18 to 24, 32.0% from 25 to 44, 32.0% from 45 to 64, and 9.5% who were 65 years of age or older. The median age was 40 years. For every 100 females, there were 107.0 males. For every 100 females age 18 and over, there were 114.8 males.

The median income for a household in the city was $44,750, and the median income for a family was $53,750. Males had a median income of $31,786 versus $26,071 for females. The per capita income for the city was $19,984. None of the population and none of the families were below the poverty line.

== Transportation ==
Amtrak’s Empire Builder, which operates between Seattle/Portland and Chicago, passes through the town on BNSF tracks, but makes no stop. The nearest station is located in Fargo, 16 miles (26 km) to the south.
