= Walsh County, North Dakota =

County in North Dakota, United States

- County
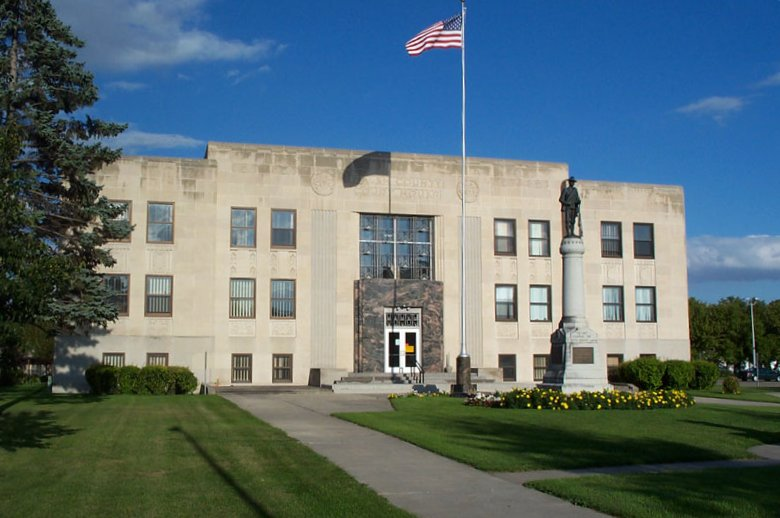
- The Walsh County Courthouse in Grafton.

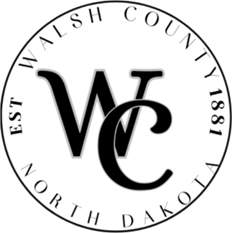
- Logo

- Location within the U.S. state of North Dakota
- Coordinates: 48.3770°N 97.7222°W
- Country: United States
- State: North Dakota
- Founded: May 2, 1881 (created); August 30, 1881 (organized)
- Named for: George H. Walsh
- Seat: Grafton
- Largest city: Grafton

Area
  - Total: 1,294.032 sq mi (3,351.53 km^{2})
  - Land: 1,281.607 sq mi (3,319.35 km^{2})
  - Water: 12.425 sq mi (32.18 km^{2}) 0.96%

Population (2020)
  - Total: 10,563
  - Estimate (2025): 10,179 ▼
  - Density: 7.969/sq mi (3.077/km^{2})
- Time zone: UTC−6 (Central)
  - Summer (DST): UTC−5 (CDT)
- Area code: 701
- Congressional district: At-large
- Website: walshcountynd.com

Walsh County is a county in the U.S. state of North Dakota. As of the 2020 census, the population was 10,563, and was estimated to be 10,179 in 2025. The county seat and the largest city is Grafton.

== History ==
The Dakota Territory legislature created the county on May 2, 1881, with areas partitioned from Grand and Pembina counties. It was organized on August 30 of that same year, with Grafton as county seat. It was named for George H. Walsh (1845–1913), a newspaperman and politician in Grand Forks.

In 1946, Walsh County was the site of one of North Dakota's deadliest tornadoes. The storm killed 11 people, including eight in Walsh County, one in Manitoba, and two in Minnesota.

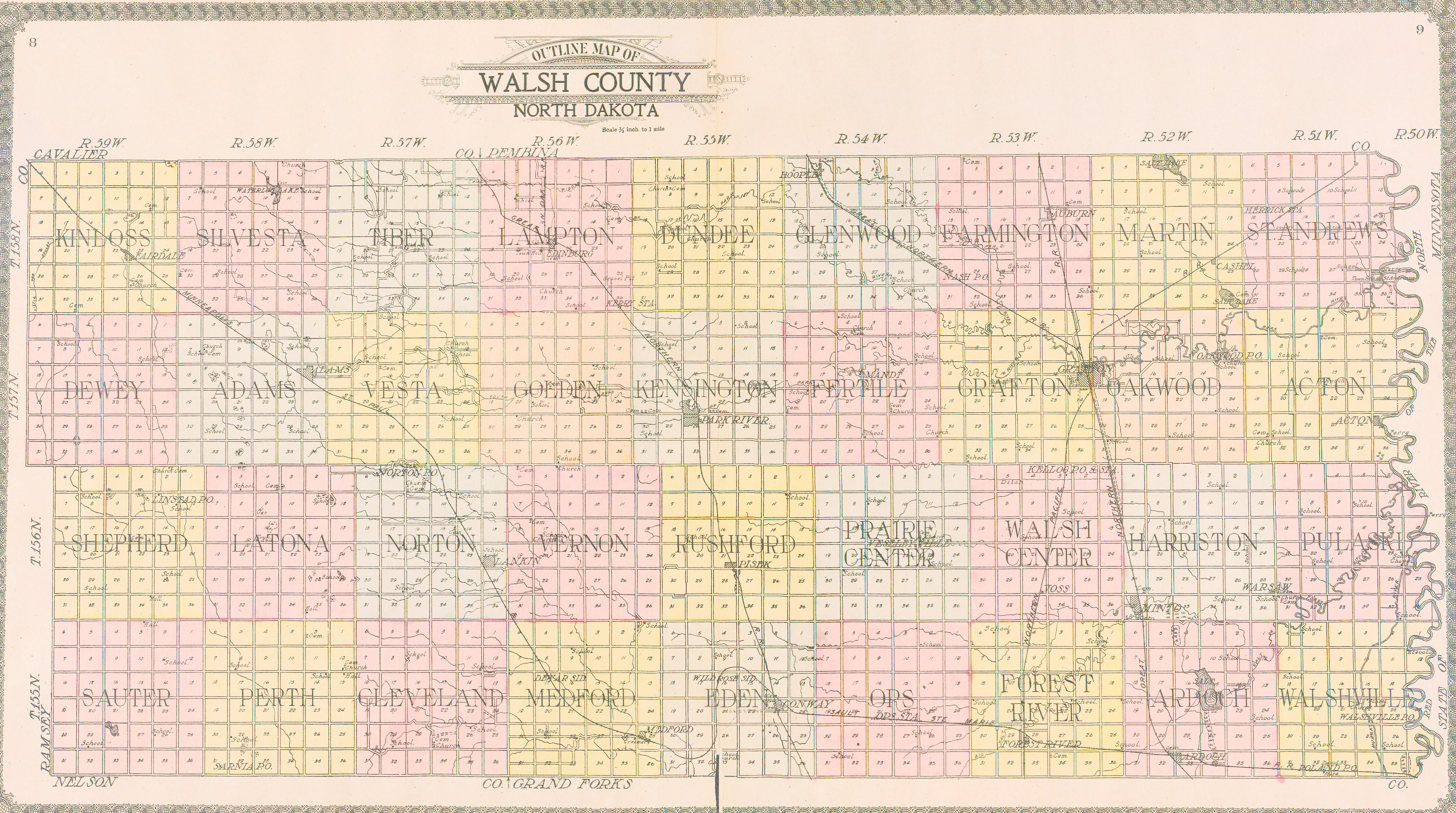
Outline map of Walsh County, North Dakota, 1910

== Geography ==
Walsh County lies on the eastern side of North Dakota. Its eastern boundary line abuts the western boundary line of the state of Minnesota (across the Red River). The Red River flows northward along the east side of the county on its way to Hudson Bay in Canada. The south branch of the Park River flows eastward through the county to discharge into the Red on the east side of the county. The terrain generally slopes to the north and east, but the highest point is its northwestern corner, at 1,647 ft (502 m) ASL.

According to the United States Census Bureau, the county has a total area of 1,294.032 square miles (3,351.53 km^{2}), of which 1,281.607 square miles (3,319.35 km^{2}) is land and 12.425 square miles (32.18 km^{2}) (0.96%) is water. It is the 22nd largest county in North Dakota by total area.

=== Major highways ===
- Interstate 29
- U.S. Highway 81
- North Dakota Highway 17
- North Dakota Highway 18
- North Dakota Highway 32
- North Dakota Highway 35
- North Dakota Highway 44
- North Dakota Highway 54

=== Adjacent counties ===
- Pembina County – north
- Kittson County, Minnesota – northeast
- Marshall County, Minnesota – east
- Grand Forks County – south
- Nelson County – southwest
- Ramsey County – west
- Cavalier County – northwest
- Polk County, Minnesota - southeast

=== Protected areas ===
- Ardoch National Wildlife Refuge
- Fairdale Slough National Waterfowl Production Area
- National Waterfowl Production Area
- North Salt Lake State Game Management Area

=== Lakes ===
- Fairdale Slough
- Homme Lake
- North Salt Lake
- Salt Lake
- Waterloo Lake
- Lake Ardoch

== Demographics ==
Historical population
Census	Pop.	Note	%±
1890	16,587		—
1900	20,288		22.3%
1910	19,491		−3.9%
1920	19,087		−2.1%
1930	20,047		5.0%
1940	20,747		3.5%
1950	18,859		−9.1%
1960	17,997		−4.6%
1970	16,251		−9.7%
1980	15,371		−5.4%
1990	13,840		−10.0%
2000	12,389		−10.5%
2010	11,119		−10.3%
2020	10,563		−5.0%
2025 (est.)	10,179		−3.6%
U.S. Decennial Census; 1790–1960 1900–1990; 1990–2000 2010–2020

As of the fourth quarter of 2025, the median home value in Walsh County was $143,614.

As of the 2024 American Community Survey, there are 4,400 estimated households in Walsh County with an average of 2.28 persons per household. The county has a median household income of $71,944. Approximately 11.2% of the county's population lives at or below the poverty line. Walsh County has an estimated 62.6% employment rate, with 19.2% of the population holding a bachelor's degree or higher and 88.8% holding a high school diploma. There were 5,184 housing units at an average density of 4.04 per square mile (1.6/km^{2}).

The top five reported languages (people were allowed to report up to two languages, thus the figures will generally add to more than 100%) were English (90.7%), Spanish (7.3%), Indo-European (1.4%), Asian and Pacific Islander (0.3%), and Other (0.3%).

The median age in the county was 43.2 years.

Walsh County, North Dakota – racial and ethnic composition Note: the US Census treats Hispanic/Latino as an ethnic category. This table excludes Latinos from the racial categories and assigns them to a separate category. Hispanics/Latinos may be of any race.
Race / ethnicity (NH = non-Hispanic)	Pop. 1980	Pop. 1990	Pop. 2000	Pop. 2010	Pop. 2020	Pop. 2024
White alone (NH)	15,005 (97.62%)	13,231 (95.60%)	11,436 (92.31%)	9,834 (88.44%)	8,676 (82.14%)	8,225 (80.53%)
Black or African American alone (NH)	4 (0.03%)	17 (0.12%)	24 (0.19%)	24 (0.22%)	69 (0.65%)	75 (0.73%)
Native American or Alaska Native alone (NH)	97 (0.63%)	97 (0.70%)	120 (0.97%)	153 (1.38%)	136 (1.29%)	191 (1.87%)
Asian alone (NH)	23 (0.15%)	54 (0.39%)	22 (0.18%)	36 (0.32%)	45 (0.43%)	107 (1.05%)
Pacific Islander alone (NH)	—	—	2 (0.02%)	4 (0.04%)	0 (0.00%)	9 (0.09%)
Other race alone (NH)	18 (0.12%)	0 (0.00%)	1 (0.01%)	3 (0.03%)	31 (0.29%)	—
Mixed race or multiracial (NH)	—	—	84 (0.68%)	96 (0.86%)	290 (2.75%)	157 (1.54%)
Hispanic or Latino (any race)	224 (1.46%)	441 (3.19%)	700 (5.65%)	969 (8.71%)	1,316 (12.46%)	1,450 (14.20%)
Total	15,371 (100.00%)	13,840 (100.00%)	12,389 (100.00%)	11,119 (100.00%)	10,563 (100.00%)	10,214 (100.00%)

=== 2024 estimate ===
As of the 2024 estimate, there were 10,214 people, 4,450 households, and _ families residing in the county. The population density was 7.97 inhabitants per square mile (3.1/km^{2}). There were 5,184 housing units at an average density of 4.04 per square mile (1.6/km^{2}). The racial makeup of the county was 93.35% White, 0.88% African American, 2.34% Native American, 1.23% Asian, 0.11% Pacific Islander, _% from some other races and 2.09% from two or more races. Hispanic or Latino people of any race were 14.20% of the population.

=== 2020 census ===
As of the 2020 census, there were 10,563 people, 4,493 households, and 2,738 families residing in the county. The population density was 8.24 inhabitants per square mile (3.2/km^{2}). There were 5,202 housing units at an average density of 4.06 inhabitants per square mile (1.6/km^{2}). The racial makeup of the county was 86.01% White, 0.67% African American, 1.37% Native American, 0.44% Asian, 0.00% Pacific Islander, 3.94% from some other races and 7.56% from two or more races. Hispanic or Latino people of any race were 12.46% of the population.

There were 4,493 households in the county, of which 25.3% had children under the age of 18 living with them and 21.7% had a female householder with no spouse or partner present. About 34.1% of all households were made up of individuals and 15.3% had someone living alone who was 65 years of age or older.

Of the residents, 22.8% were under the age of 18 and 22.3% were 65 years of age or older; the median age was 44.5 years. For every 100 females there were 104.6 males, and for every 100 females age 18 and over there were 104.8 males. Among occupied housing units, 75.3% were owner-occupied and 24.7% were renter-occupied. The homeowner vacancy rate was 2.6% and the rental vacancy rate was 10.4%.

=== 2010 census ===
As of the 2010 census, there were 11,119 people, 4,746 households, and 3,021 families in the county. The population density was 8.67 inhabitants per square mile (3.3/km^{2}). There were 5,498 housing units at an average density of 4.29 inhabitants per square mile (1.7/km^{2}). The racial makeup of the county was 93.45% White, 0.22% African American, 1.51% Native American, 0.32% Asian, 0.04% Pacific Islander, 3.10% from some other races and 1.35% from two or more races. Hispanic or Latino people of any race were 8.71% of the population.

In terms of ancestry, 39.7% were Norwegian, 21.6% were German, 11.0% were Polish, 9.4% were Irish, 9.3% were Czech, 5.8% were English, and 5.4% were American.

There were 4,746 households, 25.9% had children under the age of 18 living with them, 52.4% were married couples living together, 7.1% had a female householder with no husband present, 36.3% were non-families, and 32.8% of all households were made up of individuals. The average household size was 2.27 and the average family size was 2.88. The median age was 45.9 years.

The median income for a household in the county was $44,139 and the median income for a family was $58,429. Males had a median income of $36,934 versus $26,826 for females. The per capita income for the county was $23,829. About 5.4% of families and 9.9% of the population were below the poverty line, including 10.8% of those under age 18 and 12.7% of those age 65 or over.

== Communities ==
=== Cities ===
- Adams
- Ardoch
- Conway
- Edinburg
- Fairdale
- Fordville
- Forest River
- Grafton (county seat)
- Hoople
- Lankin
- Minto
- Park River
- Pisek

=== Census-designated places ===
- Auburn
- Nash

=== Unincorporated communities ===
- Herriott
- Veseleyville
- Voss
- Warsaw

=== Townships ===
- Acton
- Adams
- Ardoch
- Cleveland
- Dewey
- Dundee
- Eden
- Farmington
- Fertile
- Forest River
- Glenwood
- Golden
- Grafton
- Harriston
- Kensington
- Kinloss
- Lampton
- Latona
- Martin
- Medford
- Norton
- Oakwood
- Ops
- Perth
- Prairie Centre
- Pulaski
- Rushford
- St. Andrews
- Sauter
- Shepherd
- Silvesta
- Tiber
- Vernon
- Vesta
- Walsh Centre
- Walshville

Township Numbers and Range Numbers
	Range 59	Range 58	Range 57	Range 56	Range 55	Range 54	Range 53	Range 52	Range 51	Range 50
Township 155	Sauter	Perth	Cleveland	Medford	Eden	Ops	Forest River	Ardoch	Walshville	Walshville
Township 156	Shepherd	Latona	Norton	Vernon	Rushford	Prairie Centre	Walsh Centre	Harriston	Pulaski	Pulaski
Township 157	Dewey	Adams	Vesta	Golden	Kensington Township	Fertile	Grafton	Oakwood	Acton	Acton
Township 158	St. Andrews	St. Andrews	Martin	Farmington	Glenwood	Dundee	Lampton	Tiber	Silvesta	Kinloss

== Politics ==
Walsh County voters have traditionally voted Republican. In only one national election since 1964 has the county selected the Democratic Party candidate (as of 2024).

United States presidential election results for Walsh County, North Dakota
Year	Republican		Democratic		Third party(ies)	
Year	No.	%	No.	%	No.	%
1900	1,807	49.41%	1,804	49.33%	46	1.26%
1904	2,042	61.97%	1,113	33.78%	140	4.25%
1908	1,751	49.46%	1,641	46.36%	148	4.18%
1912	586	20.33%	1,206	41.85%	1,090	37.82%
1916	1,670	43.81%	2,003	52.54%	139	3.65%
1920	4,581	67.13%	2,047	30.00%	196	2.87%
1924	2,837	49.17%	917	15.89%	2,016	34.94%
1928	3,657	48.94%	3,798	50.83%	17	0.23%
1932	1,616	22.31%	5,342	73.74%	286	3.95%
1936	1,813	22.15%	5,756	70.32%	616	7.53%
1940	3,051	35.61%	5,499	64.18%	18	0.21%
1944	2,471	34.07%	4,747	65.46%	34	0.47%
1948	2,646	37.63%	4,170	59.31%	215	3.06%
1952	4,761	57.33%	3,494	42.08%	49	0.59%
1956	3,946	54.81%	3,238	44.97%	16	0.22%
1960	4,036	50.16%	4,009	49.82%	2	0.02%
1964	2,454	33.27%	4,911	66.58%	11	0.15%
1968	3,410	50.06%	2,948	43.28%	454	6.66%
1972	3,991	56.29%	2,908	41.02%	191	2.69%
1976	3,518	48.13%	3,555	48.64%	236	3.23%
1980	4,488	64.69%	1,850	26.66%	600	8.65%
1984	4,347	64.84%	2,264	33.77%	93	1.39%
1988	3,250	54.48%	2,646	44.35%	70	1.17%
1992	2,544	43.09%	1,936	32.79%	1,424	24.12%
1996	2,222	44.99%	2,082	42.15%	635	12.86%
2000	3,099	59.80%	1,743	33.64%	340	6.56%
2004	3,194	61.59%	1,905	36.73%	87	1.68%
2008	2,415	49.47%	2,325	47.62%	142	2.91%
2012	2,656	55.44%	1,985	41.43%	150	3.13%
2016	2,995	64.60%	1,167	25.17%	474	10.22%
2020	3,324	69.50%	1,333	27.87%	126	2.63%
2024	3,186	70.86%	1,173	26.09%	137	3.05%

== Education ==
School districts include:

- Dakota Prairie Public School District 1, McVille
- Drayton Public School District 19, Drayton
- Edmore Public School District 2, Edmore
- Fordville-Lankin Public School District 5, Fordville
- Grafton Public School District 3, Grafton
- Lakota Public School District 66, Lakota
- Manvel Public School District 125, Manvel
- Midway Public School District 128, Inkster
- Minto Public School District 20, Minto
- Park River Area Public School District 8, Park River
- Valley-Edinburg Public School District 118, Crystal

== See also ==
- National Register of Historic Places listings in Walsh County, North Dakota
