= Nash, North Dakota =

- CDP & Unincorporated community
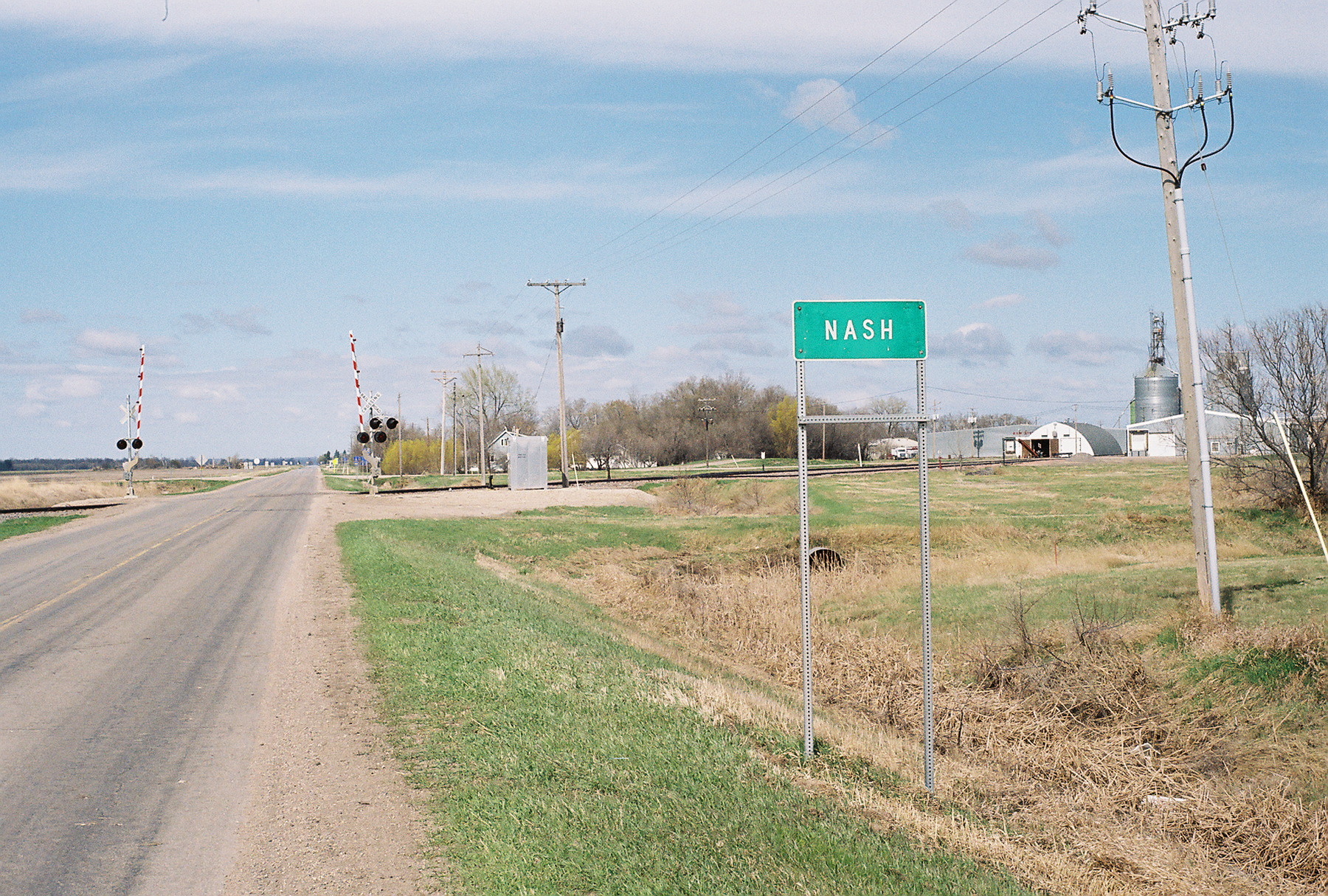
- Entering Nash, North Dakota from the East
- Interactive map of Nash, North Dakota
- Location within North Dakota
- Coordinates: 48.4778°N 97.5245°W
- Country: United States
- State: North Dakota
- County: Walsh
- Founded: 1890
- Named after: Nash brothers

Area
  - Total: 1.022 sq mi (2.647 km^{2})
  - Land: 1.022 sq mi (2.647 km^{2})
  - Water: 0 sq mi (0.000 km^{2}) 0.00%
- Elevation: 856 ft (261 m)

Population (2020)
  - Total: 13
  - Estimate (2025): 10
  - Density: 13/sq mi (4.9/km^{2})
- Time zone: UTC–6 (Central (CST))
  - Summer (DST): UTC–5 (CDT)
- ZIP Code: 58237
- Area code: 701
- FIPS code: 38-55500
- GNIS feature ID: 2584352
- Highways: CR 6, CR 9

Nash is a census-designated place (CDP) and unincorporated community in Walsh County, North Dakota, United States. The population was 13 as of the 2020 census, and was estimated at 10 in 2025. It is 9 miles (14 km) northwest of Grafton.

The unincorporated community is located in Farmington Township.

Nash was designated as part of the United States Census Bureau's Participant Statistical Areas Program on March 31, 2010. It was not counted separately during the 2000 census, but was included in the 2010 census.

== History ==
Nash was founded in 1890 as a station along the Great Northern Railroad and named for the Nash brothers, pioneer settlers in the area who operated a fruit store in Grafton and started what is now the Nash Finch Company, the third-largest food wholesaler in the United States.

== Geography ==
According to the United States Census Bureau, the CDP has a total area of 1.022 square miles (2.65 km^{2}), all land.

== Demographics ==
Historical population
| Census | Pop. | Note | %± |
|---|---|---|---|
| 2010 | 32 | | — |
| 2020 | 13 | | −59.4% |
| 2025 (est.) | 10 | | −23.1% |
U.S. Decennial Census; 2020 Census

As of the 2024 American Community Survey, there were 7 estimated households in Nash with an average of 0.0 persons per household. The CDP has a median household income of $0. Approximately 0.0% of the CDP's population lives at or below the poverty line. Nash has an estimated 100.0% employment rate, with 0.0% of the population holding a bachelor's degree or higher and 0.0% holding a high school diploma. There were 7 housing units at an average density of 6.85 per square mile (2.6/km^{2}).

The top five reported languages (people were allowed to report up to two languages, thus the figures will generally add to more than 100%) were English (100.0%), Spanish (0.0%), Indo-European (0.0%), Asian and Pacific Islander (0.0%), and Other (0.0%).

The median age in the CDP was 40 to 44 years.

Nash, North Dakota – racial and ethnic composition Note: the US Census treats Hispanic/Latino as an ethnic category. This table excludes Latinos from the racial categories and assigns them to a separate category. Hispanics/Latinos may be of any race.
| Race / ethnicity (NH = non-Hispanic) | Pop. 2010 | Pop. 2020 | % 2010 | % 2020 |
|---|---|---|---|---|
| White alone (NH) | 23 | 11 | 71.88% | 84.62% |
| Black or African American alone (NH) | 0 | 0 | 0.00% | 0.00% |
| Native American or Alaska Native alone (NH) | 0 | 0 | 0.00% | 0.00% |
| Asian alone (NH) | 0 | 1 | 0.00% | 7.69% |
| Pacific Islander alone (NH) | 0 | 0 | 0.00% | 0.00% |
| Other race alone (NH) | 0 | 0 | 0.00% | 0.00% |
| Mixed race or multiracial (NH) | 0 | 1 | 0.00% | 7.69% |
| Hispanic or Latino (any race) | 9 | 0 | 28.13% | 0.00% |
| Total | 32 | 13 | 100.00% | 100.00% |

=== 2020 census ===
As of the 2020 census, there were 13 people, 6 households, and 4 families residing in the CDP. The population density was 12.72 inhabitants per square mile (4.91/km^{2}). There were 9 housing units at an average density of 8.81 per square mile (3.40/km^{2}). The racial makeup of the CDP was 84.62% White, 0.00% African American, 0.00% Native American, 7.69% Asian, 0.00% Pacific Islander, 0.00% from some other races and 7.69% from two or more races. Hispanic or Latino people of any race were 0.00% of the population.

=== 2010 census ===
As of the 2010 census, there were 32 people, 12 households, and 9 families residing in the CDP. The population density was 31.31 inhabitants per square mile (12.09/km^{2}). There were 13 housing units at an average density of 12.72 per square mile (4.91/km^{2}). The racial makeup of the CDP was 93.75% White, 0.00% African American, 0.00% Native American, 0.00% Asian, 0.00% Pacific Islander, 6.25% from some other races and 0.00% from two or more races. Hispanic or Latino people of any race were 28.13% of the population.

There were 12 households, of which 25.0% had children under the age of 18 living with them, 50.0% were married couples living together, 16.7% had a female householder with no husband present, 8.3% had a male householder with no wife present, and 25.0% were non-families. 16.7% of all households were made up of individuals, and 8.3% had someone living alone who was 65 years of age or older. The average household size was 2.67 and the average family size was 3.11.

The median age in the CDP was 37.5 years. 25.0% of residents were under the age of 18; 12.5% were between the ages of 18 and 24; 15.6% were from 25 to 44; 37.5% were from 45 to 64; and 9.4% were 65 years of age or older. The gender makeup of the CDP was 50.0% male and 50.0% female.
