= Acton Township, Walsh County, North Dakota =

Acton Township, North Dakota
- Township
- Location within the state of North Dakota
- Coordinates: 48°25′10″N 97°12′5″W
- Country: United States
- State: North Dakota
- County: Walsh

Area
  - Total: 38.1 sq mi (98.8 km^{2})
  - Land: 37.7 sq mi (97.7 km^{2})
  - Water: 0.42 sq mi (1.1 km^{2})
- Elevation: 804 ft (245 m)

Population (2000)
  - Total: 109
  - Density: 2.8/sq mi (1.1/km^{2})
- Time zone: UTC-6 (Central (CST))
  - Summer (DST): UTC-5 (CDT)
- Area code: 701
- FIPS code: 38-00260
- GNIS feature ID: 1036533

Acton Township is a township in Walsh County, North Dakota, United States.
