= Ardoch, North Dakota =

- City
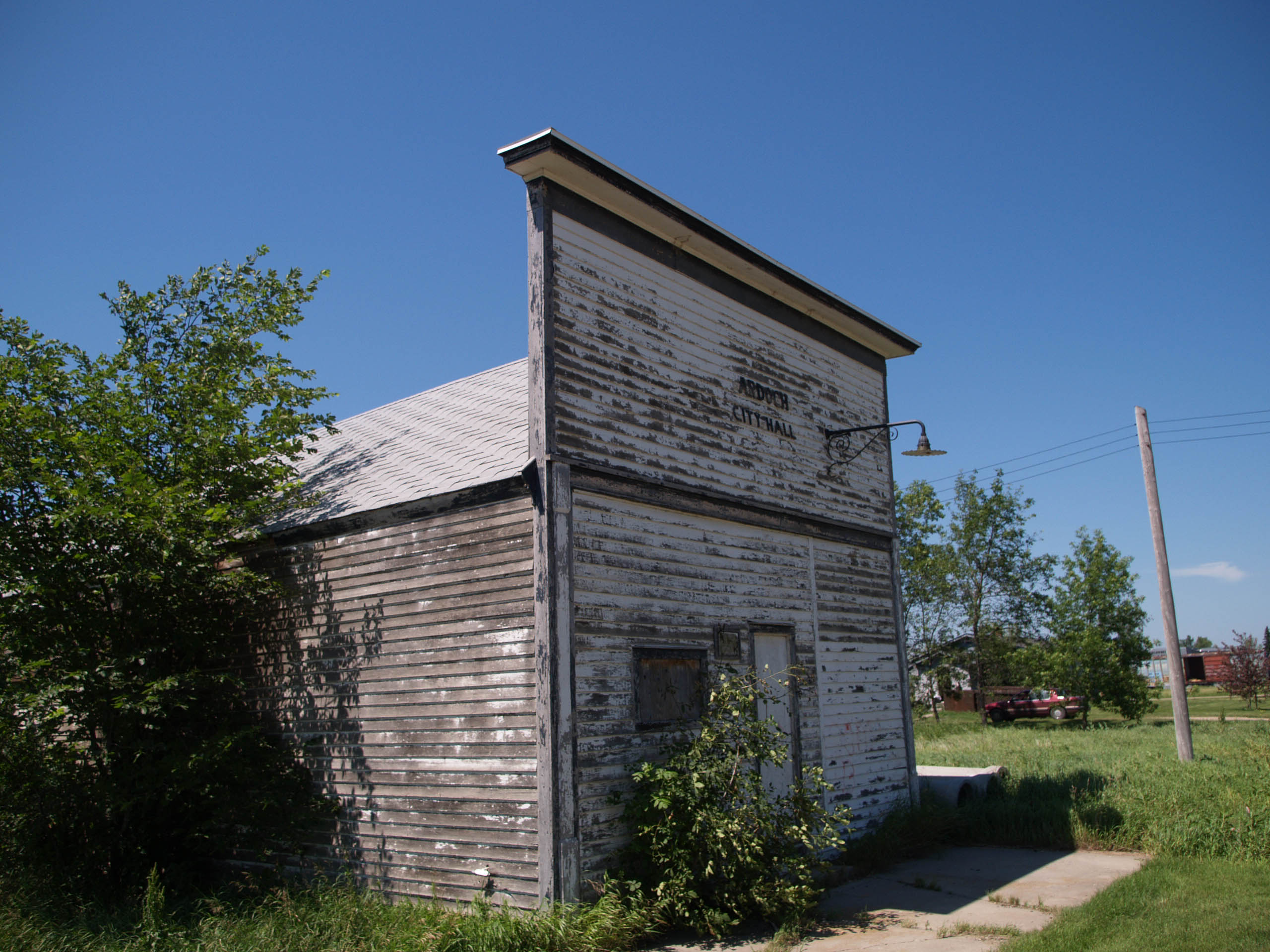
- City Hall in Ardoch
- Interactive map of Ardoch, North Dakota
- Location within North Dakota
- Coordinates: 48.2054°N 97.3380°W
- Country: United States
- State: North Dakota
- County: Walsh
- Founded: 1881

Area
  - Total: 0.377 sq mi (0.976 km^{2})
  - Land: 0.377 sq mi (0.976 km^{2})
  - Water: 0 sq mi (0.000 km^{2}) 0.00%
- Elevation: 827 ft (252 m)

Population (2020)
  - Total: 31
  - Estimate (2025): 31
  - Density: 82/sq mi (32/km^{2})
- Time zone: UTC–6 (Central (CST))
  - Summer (DST): UTC–5 (CDT)
- ZIP Code: 58261
- Area code: 701
- FIPS code: 38-02860
- GNIS feature ID: 1035913

Ardoch is a city in Walsh County, North Dakota, United States. The population was 31 as of the 2020 census, and was estimated at 31 in 2025.

== History ==
Ardoch, named for the community of Ardoch, Ontario, was founded in 1881.

== Geography ==
According to the United States Census Bureau, the city has a total area of 0.377 square miles (0.98 km^{2}), all land.

== Demographics ==
Historical population
Census	Pop.	Note	%±
1890	214		—
1900	298		39.3%
1910	271		−9.1%
1920	153		−43.5%
1930	110		−28.1%
1940	119		8.2%
1950	137		15.1%
1960	106		−22.6%
1970	70		−34.0%
1980	78		11.4%
1990	49		−37.2%
2000	61		24.5%
2010	67		9.8%
2020	31		−53.7%
2025 (est.)	31		0.0%
U.S. Decennial Census; 2020 Census

=== 2020 census ===
As of the 2020 census, there were 31 people, 14 households, and 5 families residing in the city.

=== 2010 census ===
As of the 2010 census, there were 67 people, 19 households, and 15 families residing in the city. The population density was 257.7 inhabitants per square mile (99.5/km^{2}). There were 39 housing units at an average density of 150.0 per square mile (57.9/km^{2}). The racial makeup of the city was 91.0% White, 6.0% from other races, and 3.0% from two or more races. Hispanic or Latino people of any race were 44.8% of the population.

There were 19 households, of which 47.4% had children under the age of 18 living with them, 47.4% were married couples living together, 26.3% had a female householder with no husband present, 5.3% had a male householder with no wife present, and 21.1% were non-families. 15.8% of all households were made up of individuals, and 5.3% had someone living alone who was 65 years of age or older. The average household size was 3.53 and the average family size was 3.87.

The median age in the city was 29.5 years. 29.9% of residents were under the age of 18; 16.4% were between the ages of 18 and 24; 13.5% were from 25 to 44; 38.8% were from 45 to 64; and 1.5% were 65 years of age or older. The gender makeup of the city was 53.7% male and 46.3% female.

=== 2000 census ===
As of the 2000 census, there were 61 people, 18 households, and 12 families residing in the city. The population density was 235.0 inhabitants per square mile (90.7/km^{2}). There were 41 housing units at an average density of 157.9 per square mile (61.0/km^{2}). The racial makeup of the city was 60.66% White, 24.59% from other races, and 14.75% from two or more races. Hispanic or Latino people of any race were 54.10% of the population.

There were 18 households, out of which 38.9% had children under the age of 18 living with them, 50.0% were married couples living together, 5.6% had a female householder with no husband present, and 33.3% were non-families. 27.8% of all households were made up of individuals, and 5.6% had someone living alone who was 65 years of age or older. The average household size was 3.39 and the average family size was 4.00.

In the city, the population was spread out, with 45.9% under the age of 18, 1.6% from 18 to 24, 37.7% from 25 to 44, 9.8% from 45 to 64, and 4.9% who were 65 years of age or older. The median age was 28 years. For every 100 females, there were 134.6 males. For every 100 females age 18 and over, there were 135.7 males.

The median income for a household in the city was $21,250, and the median income for a family was $23,750. Males had a median income of $41,875 versus $18,750 for females. The per capita income for the city was $7,306. There were 35.7% of families and 31.4% of the population living below the poverty line, including 21.9% of under eighteens and 58.3% of those over 64.
