= Pulaski Township, Walsh County, North Dakota =

Coordinates: 48.3169°N 97.2003°W

Pulaski Township
- Township
- Interactive map of Pulaski Township
- Country: United States
- State: North Dakota
- County: Walsh County

Area
  - Total: 34.400 sq mi (89.096 km^{2})
  - Land: 34.100 sq mi (88.319 km^{2})
  - Water: 0.300 sq mi (0.777 km^{2})

Population
  - Total: 106
- Time zone: UTC-6 (CST)
  - Summer (DST): UTC-5 (CDT)

Pulaski Township is a township in Walsh County, North Dakota, United States.

== See also ==
- Walsh County, North Dakota
