= Park River, North Dakota =

- City
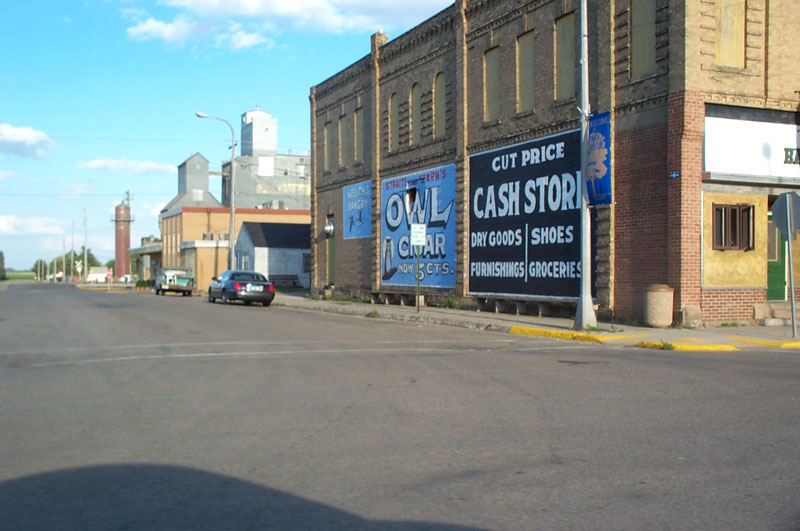
- Downtown Park River with grain elevators in the background
- Motto: "The Town With a Heart"
- Location of Park River, North Dakota
- Coordinates: 48°23′28″N 97°44′34″W
- Country: United States
- State: North Dakota
- County: Walsh
- Founded: 1884

Government
  - Mayor: Kyle Halvorson

Area
  - Total: 2.59 sq mi (6.71 km^{2})
  - Land: 2.59 sq mi (6.71 km^{2})
  - Water: 0 sq mi (0.00 km^{2})
- Elevation: 997 ft (304 m)

Population (2020)
  - Total: 1,424
  - Estimate (2022): 1,407
  - Density: 549.8/sq mi (212.28/km^{2})
- Time zone: UTC-6 (Central (CST))
  - Summer (DST): UTC-5 (CDT)
- ZIP code: 58270
- Area code: 701
- FIPS code: 38-60900
- GNIS feature ID: 1036213
- Highways: ND 17
- Website: cityofparkriver.com

Park River is a city in Walsh County, North Dakota, United States. The population was 1,424 at the 2020 census. Park River was founded in 1884. Park River was named after the river Park River.

The controversial and often peripatetic father of John D. Rockefeller, William Avery Rockefeller, lived for a time on a 160-acre ranch in Park River that his son had purchased for him. The senior Rockefeller lived in the town through the 1890s, even after the original property was sold by his son in 1889.

In 1903, a Park River blacksmith named Samuel Holland built a motor car called the Holland Special. He built at least five more cars between 1903 and 1908.

== Geography ==
According to the United States Census Bureau, the city has a total area of 2.17 square miles (5.62 km^{2}), all land.

== Demographics ==
Historical population
Census	Pop.	Note	%±
1890	534		—
1900	1,088		103.7%
1910	1,008		−7.4%
1920	1,114		10.5%
1930	1,131		1.5%
1940	1,408		24.5%
1950	1,692		20.2%
1960	1,813		7.2%
1970	1,680		−7.3%
1980	1,844		9.8%
1990	1,725		−6.5%
2000	1,535		−11.0%
2010	1,403		−8.6%
2020	1,424		1.5%
2022 (est.)	1,407		−1.2%
U.S. Decennial Census; 2020 Census

=== 2010 census ===
As of the census of 2010, there were 1,403 people, 643 households and 360 families living in the city. The population density was 646.5 per square mile (249.6/km^{2}). There were 734 housing units at an average density of 338.2 per square mile (130.6/km^{2}). The racial make-up of the population was 97.0% White, 1.3% Native American, 0.2% Asian, 0.4% from other races and 1.1% from two or more races. Hispanic or Latino people of any race were 2.4%.

Of the 643 households, 23.5% had children under the age of 18 living with them, 44.6% were married couples living together, 8.6% had a female householder with no husband present, 2.8% had a male householder with no wife present and 44.0% were non-families. 39.7% of households were one person and 20.6% were one person aged 65 or older. The average household size was 2.07 and the average family size was 2.80.

The median age was 49.4 years. 21.2% of residents were under the age of 18; 4.3% were between the ages of 18 and 24; 19.1% were from 25 to 44; 28.1% were from 45 to 64; and 27.5% were 65 or older. The sex make-up of the city was 49.0% male and 51.0% female.

=== 2000 census ===
As of the census of 2000, there were 1,535 people, 660 households and 390 families living in the city. The population density was 772.6 per square mile (298.3/km^{2}). There were 760 housing units at an average density of 382.5 per square mile (147.7/km^{2}). The racial make-up of the population was 95.57% White, 0.07% African American, 1.63% Native American, 0.07% Asian, 1.56% from other races and 1.11% from two or more races. Hispanic or Latino people of any race were 2.61% of the population.

Of the 660 households, 27.0% had children under the age of 18 living with them, 47.9% were married couples living together, 8.8% had a female householder with no husband present and 40.8% were non-families. 38.0% of households were one person and 20.8% were one person aged 65 or older. The average household size was 2.18 and the average family size was 2.88.

22.1% of the population was under the age of 18, 6.3% from 18 to 24, 20.9% from 25 to 44, 22.1% from 45 to 64 and 28.5% were 65 or older. The median age was 45 years. For every 100 females, there were 87.4 males. For every 100 females age 18 and over, there were 78.9 males.

The median household income was $30,347 and the median family income was $40,000. Males had a median income of $26,154 and females $20,769. The per capita income was $15,990. About 6.8% of families and 7.8% of the population were below the poverty line, including 9.1% of those under age 18 and 7.2% of those age 65 or over.

== Climate ==
This climatic region is typified by large seasonal temperature differences, with warm to hot (and often humid) summers and cold (sometimes severely cold) winters. According to the Köppen Climate Classification system, Park River has a humid continental climate, abbreviated "Dfb" on climate maps.

== Notable people ==
- Roger Allin, fourth governor of North Dakota
- Fred Hultstrand, a professional photographer who had Hulstrand Studio in Park River
- Al McIntosh, newspaper editor whose columns are featured in Ken Burns' The War
- William Rockefeller Sr., father of John D. Rockefeller, lived in Park River during the summers from 1881 until at least 1897.
- Paul Thorlakson, a Canadian doctor

== See also ==
- List of cities in North Dakota
