= Drayton, North Dakota =

- City
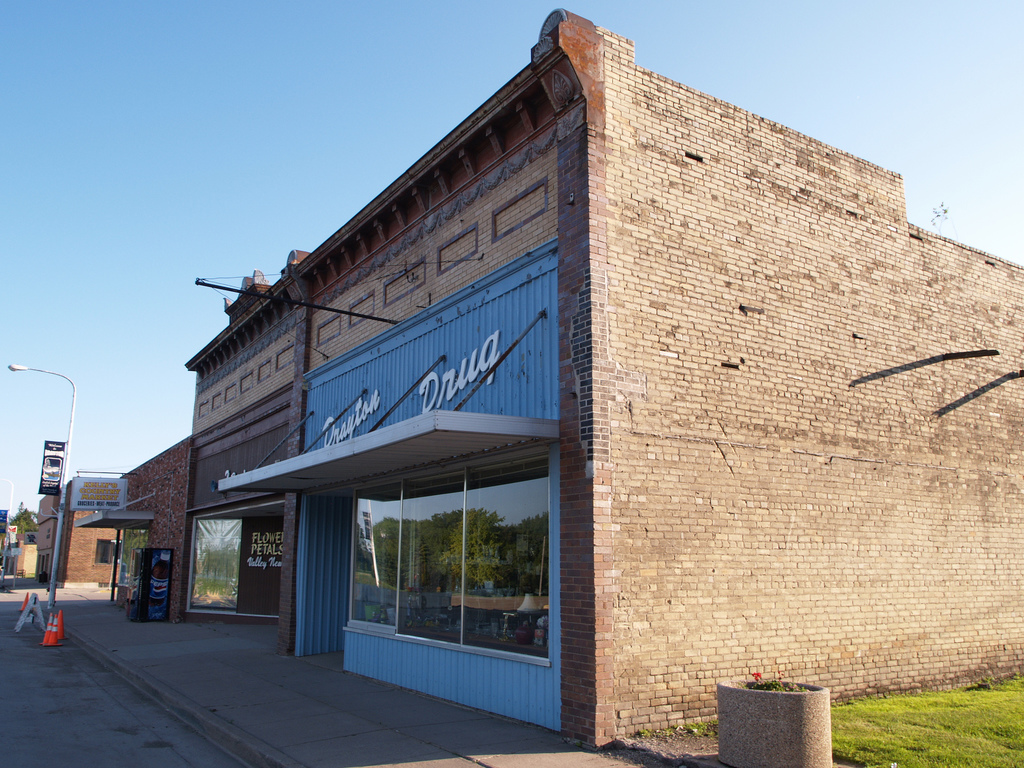
- Drayton Drug in Downtown Drayton

- Flag Logo
- Nicknames: "Baseball Capital of North Dakota" "Catfish Capital of the North"
- Location of Drayton, North Dakota
- Coordinates: 48°33′43″N 97°10′46″W
- Country: United States
- State: North Dakota
- County: Pembina
- Founded: 1878

Area
  - Total: 0.66 sq mi (1.71 km^{2})
  - Land: 0.66 sq mi (1.71 km^{2})
  - Water: 0 sq mi (0.00 km^{2})
- Elevation: 801 ft (244 m)

Population (2020)
  - Total: 757
  - Estimate (2022): 746
  - Density: 1,149.8/sq mi (443.94/km^{2})
- Time zone: UTC-6 (Central (CST))
  - Summer (DST): UTC-5 (CDT)
- ZIP code: 58225
- Area code: 701
- FIPS code: 38-20340
- GNIS feature ID: 1035998
- Website: draytonnd.com

Drayton is a city in Pembina County, North Dakota, United States. The population was 757 at the 2020 census. Drayton was founded in 1878.

== Geography ==
According to the United States Census Bureau, the city has a total area of 0.65 square miles (1.68 km^{2}), all land.

== History ==
Drayton was originally called Hastings Landing. It was given its present name by Canadian settlers from Drayton, Ontario. A drawbridge, built in anticipation of riverboat traffic returning to the upper Red River, was built in 1911 to connect Drayton to Minnesota. Because of low river levels the riverboats never materialized, with the result that the drawbridge never needed to be raised.

== Economy ==
The main employer in the area is American Crystal Sugar, which operates a sugar refinery on the outskirts of town, providing 140 year round and 75 seasonal jobs.

== Demographics ==
Historical population
Census	Pop.	Note	%±
1880	62		—
1890	318		412.9%
1900	688		116.4%
1910	587		−14.7%
1920	637		8.5%
1930	502		−21.2%
1940	688		37.1%
1950	875		27.2%
1960	940		7.4%
1970	1,095		16.5%
1980	1,082		−1.2%
1990	961		−11.2%
2000	913		−5.0%
2010	824		−9.7%
2020	757		−8.1%
2022 (est.)	746		−1.5%
U.S. Decennial Census; 2020 Census

=== 2010 census ===
As of the census of 2010, there were 824 people, 389 households, and 225 families living in the city. The population density was 1,267.7 inhabitants per square mile (489.5/km^{2}). There were 422 housing units at an average density of 649.2 per square mile (250.7/km^{2}). The racial makeup of the city was 98.3% White, 0.4% African American, 0.6% Native American, 0.1% from other races, and 0.6% from two or more races. Hispanic or Latino of any race were 1.5% of the population.

There were 389 households, of which 22.9% had children under the age of 18 living with them, 48.6% were married couples living together, 5.7% had a female householder with no husband present, 3.6% had a male householder with no wife present, and 42.2% were non-families. 35.0% of all households were made up of individuals, and 16.5% had someone living alone who was 65 years of age or older. The average household size was 2.12 and the average family size was 2.72.

The median age in the city was 45.9 years. 20.5% of residents were under the age of 18; 5.4% were between the ages of 18 and 24; 22.7% were from 25 to 44; 32% were from 45 to 64; and 19.5% were 65 years of age or older. The gender makeup of the city was 53.4% male and 46.6% female.

=== 2000 census ===
As of the census of 2000, there were 913 people, 401 households, and 249 families living in the city. The population density was 1,548.9 inhabitants per square mile (598.0/km^{2}). There were 440 housing units at an average density of 746.5 per square mile (288.2/km^{2}). The racial makeup of the city was 97.81% White, 0.22% Native American, 0.66% from other races, and 1.31% from two or more races. Hispanic or Latino of any race were 2.08% of the population.

There were 401 households, out of which 29.4% had children under the age of 18 living with them, 52.6% were married couples living together, 5.5% had a female householder with no husband present, and 37.9% were non-families. 35.2% of all households were made up of individuals, and 18.7% had someone living alone who was 65 years of age or older. The average household size was 2.28 and the average family size was 2.95.

In the city, the population was spread out, with 25.4% under the age of 18, 5.4% from 18 to 24, 27.3% from 25 to 44, 22.3% from 45 to 64, and 19.6% who were 65 years of age or older. The median age was 40 years. For every 100 females, there were 103.3 males. For every 100 females age 18 and over, there were 103.3 males.

According to the 2000 census, the median income for a household in the city was $37,344, and the median income for a family was $46,484. Males had a median income of $35,543 versus $18,750 for females. The per capita income for the city was $17,211. About 8.5% of families and 10.6% of the population were below the poverty line, including 12.9% of those under age 18 and 12.1% of those age 65 or over.

== Baseball Capital of North Dakota ==
In 1958, Governor John Davis declared Drayton the baseball capital of North Dakota. Drayton won the state High School baseball championship every year from 1958 to 1963. In 1958 and 1962, Drayton also won the American Legion class A championship. After winning the state title in 1958, they went on to win the multi-state regional championship. These wins made Drayton the smallest town to win both the state and regional class A titles.

== Climate ==
This climatic region is typified by large seasonal temperature differences, with warm to hot (and often humid) summers and cold (sometimes severely cold) winters. According to the Köppen Climate Classification system, Drayton has a humid continental climate, abbreviated "Dfb" on climate maps.

== See also ==
- Drayton United Methodist Church
