= Maine State Route 171 =

North-south state highway in Maine, US

State Route 171

Route information
- Maintained by MaineDOT
- Length: 17.76 mi (28.58 km)
- Existed: 1925–present

Major junctions
- South end: SR 169 in Prentiss
- North end: US 2A in Reed Plantation

Location
- Country: United States
- State: Maine
- Counties: Aroostook, Penobscot

Highway system
- Maine State Highway System; Interstate; US; State; Auto trails; Lettered highways
← SR 170	→ SR 172

State Route 171 (SR 171) is part of Maine's system of numbered state highways. It runs 17.8 miles (28.6 km) from an intersection with SR 169 in Prentiss to an intersection with U.S. Route 2A (US 2A) in Reed Plantation. SR 171 travels through Drew Plantation and the unincorporated community of Wytopitlock.

== Junction list ==
County	Location	mi	km	Destinations	Notes
Penobscot	Prentiss	0.00	0.00	SR 169 (Averill Road) – Springfield, Danforth	
Aroostook	Reed Plantation	17.83	28.69	US 2A (Military Road) – Macwahoc, Haynesville, Houlton	
1.000 mi = 1.609 km; 1.000 km = 0.621 mi
