= Maine State Route 170 =

State highway in Maine, US

State Route 170

Route information
- Maintained by MaineDOT
- Length: 20.3 mi (32.7 km)

Major junctions
- South end: SR 6 / SR 169 in Springfield
- North end: US 2 in Macwahoc

Location
- Country: United States
- State: Maine
- Counties: Penobscot, Aroostook

Highway system
- Maine State Highway System; Interstate; US; State; Auto trails; Lettered highways
| ← SR 169 | → SR 171 |

State Route 170 (SR 170) is a 20-mile-long (32 km) state highway in Penobscot and Aroostook counties, located in central Maine. It runs from Springfield to Macwahoc.

== Route description ==
The southern terminus of SR 170 is at SR 6 in the town center of Springfield. This point is also the southern terminus of SR 169. The two routes share a concurrency along Park Street for about four miles (6.4 km). The road passes a few homes, a church, and the site of the Springfield Fair. It also passes a few small farms before transitioning to a wooded area. In the northeast corner of Springfield, SR 169 splits to the northeast towards Danforth while SR 170 continues north. SR 170 clips the southeast corner of Webster before it enters the unincorporated territory of Prentiss. There are only a couple of houses on the side of the road as it heads north through Prentiss. It curves towards the west and re-enters Webster, this time at its northeast corner, before entering the unincorporated territory of Kingman.

At first, the road through Kingman is sparsely populated passing mainly through forest areas. SR 170 passes a small farm before crossing the Mattawamkeag River and bending 90 degrees to the west and entering the town center. While making the curve, a railroad makes a grade crossing with the road. It passes some small houses before making another sharper 90-degree bend to the north and passing additional houses and the Kingman post office. Continuing north, it exits Kingman and Penobscot County for Macwahoc and Aroostook County. It passes some small farms and houses before coming to an end at U.S. Route 2 near the Mattawamkeag River.

== Major junctions ==
| County | Location | mi | km | Destinations | Notes |
|---|---|---|---|---|---|
| Penobscot | Springfield | 0.0 | 0.0 | SR 6 (Main Street) / SR 169 begins / Shep Road – Topsfield, Lincoln | Southern end of SR 169 concurrency |
| Penobscot | Springfield | 3.7 | 6.0 | SR 169 north – Danforth, Houlton | Northern end of SR 169 concurrency |
| Aroostook | Macwahoc | 20.3 | 32.7 | US 2 (Houlton Road) – Houlton | |
1.000 mi = 1.609 km; 1.000 km = 0.621 mi: Concurrency terminus
