= Union Hall =

Union Hall may refer to:

== Australia ==
- Union Hall (Adelaide), a hall and theatre in Adelaide, South Australia

== Ireland ==
- Union Hall, County Cork, a village in Ireland

== United States ==
- Union Hall (Danforth, Maine), listed on the National Register of Historic Places (NRHP)
- Union Hall (Searsport, Maine), NRHP-listed
- Union Hall (Truro, Massachusetts), NRHP-listed
- Union Hall (Chaumont, New York), NRHP-listed
- Union Hall (North Salem, New York), NRHP-listed
- Union Hall, Virginia, in Franklin County, Virginia

== See also ==
- Trades hall
