= Trades hall =

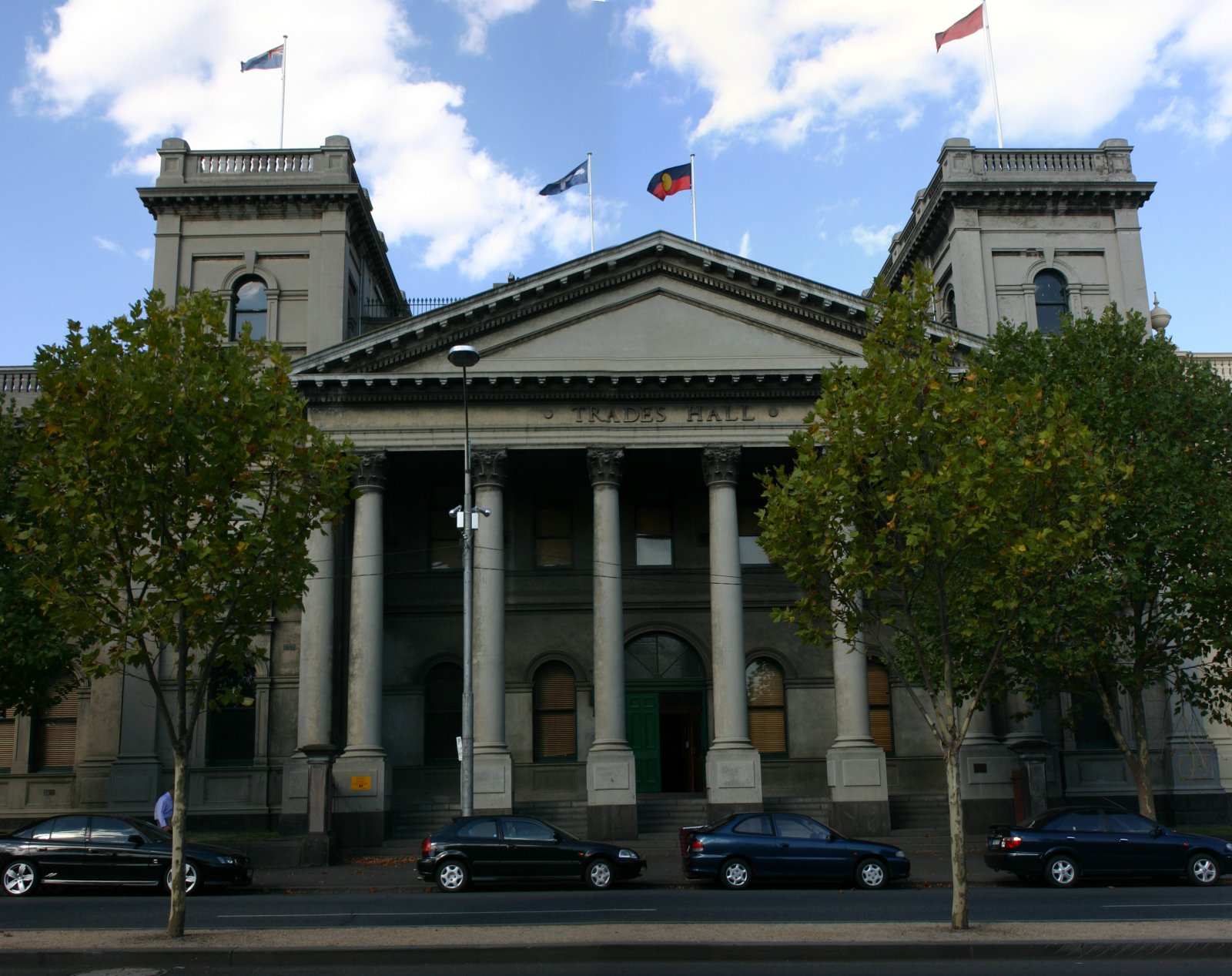
Victorian Trades Hall

A trades hall is a building where trade unions meet together, or work from cooperatively, as a local representative organisation, known as a labour council or trades hall council. Trades halls are traditionally used by workers and their representatives as a base to campaign for better working conditions and rights, and may also serve as the site of the union's hiring hall. Trades halls have also served as community centers. The term is commonly used in England, New Zealand, Scotland and Australia. They are sometimes called a union hall, or labour temple in North America (see, for instance, Finnish Labour Temple, Labor Temple Building, Union Hall (Danforth, Maine), etc.).

They are sometimes colloquially called "the worker's parliament".

== Examples ==
=== Trades Hall (Willesden) ===
Purchased in 1924 by the Willesden Trades and Labour Hall Society, this trades hall in London has been used for union and labour functions, hosted speakers such as Nelson Mandela and Sylvia Pankhurst, and also strikers involved in a range of industrial action, including the Grunwick dispute. It has hosted community and music events in the Apollo Club, where Bob Marley once played.

=== Trades Hall (Glasgow) ===
Situated on Glassford Street in Glasgow, this trades hall opened in 1794 and houses the Trades House, for Glasgows crafts which include Bakers, Barbers, Bonnetmakers & Dyers, Coopers, Cordiners, Fleshers, Gardeners, Hammermen, Maltmen, Masons, Skinners, Tailors, Weavers, and Wrights. The building was designed to have a banqueting hall and shops.

=== Victorian Trades Hall ===
Located in Melbourne, this trades hall was originally built following people campaigning for an 8 hour working day, which they achieved success in during 1856, with the original trades hall built in 1859. The Victorian Trades Hall was used by Victorian unions.

=== Wellington Trades Hall ===
Based in Wellington, New Zealand, this trades hall was designed by William Fielding, and opened in the late 1920's. It has been used by unions, including in relation to the 1951 waterfront dispute. The building was used by the Labour Party, as an office. As well as union activities, the building was used for educational purposes and is still used by unions.

== See also ==
- Labour council
- Union Hall (disambiguation)
- Category:Trades halls in Australia
- Johannesburg Trades Hall
- Trades Hall of National Training School for Women and Girls
- Trades Hall, Glasgow
