= Special routes of U.S. Route 2 =

Special routes of U.S. Route 2

Highway system
- United States Numbered Highway System; List; Special; Divided

There are a number of special routes of U.S. Route 2 (US 2). These special routes connect U.S. Route 2 to downtown areas, bypass city centers, or provide alternate routes around an area.

== Washington ==
=== Cashmere business route ===
U.S. Route 2 Business
- Location: Cashmere, Washington

== North Dakota ==
=== Williston business loop ===
U.S. Highway 2 Business
- Location: Williston, North Dakota
- Length: 3.642 mi (5.861 km)

U.S. Highway 2 Business (US 2 Bus.) in Williston, North Dakota, is a route that goes into the downtown area of Williston. This was formerly also signed as US 85 Bus.

==== Major intersections ====
The entire route is in Williston, Williams County.

mi	km	Destinations	Notes
0.000	0.000	US 2 / ND 1804 west (W Dakota Parkway) / 27th Avenue NW	Western terminus; west end of ND 1804 concurrency
1.847	2.972	ND 1804 east (1st Street) / Main Street	East end of ND 1804 concurrency
3.642	5.861	Dakota Parkway / 2nd Avenue W (US 2) / 26th Avenue	Eastern terminus
1.000 mi = 1.609 km; 1.000 km = 0.621 mi: Concurrency terminus

=== Minot business loop ===
U.S. Highway 2 Business
- Location: Minot, North Dakota
- Length: 5.865 mi (9.439 km)

U.S. Highway 2 Business (US 2 Bus.) in Minot, North Dakota, begins at US 2 and US 52. US 2 is a bypass of the downtown area while US 2 Bus. goes through the downtown area. It intersects US 83 and a connector leading to US 52 before returning to US 2 east of downtown Minot.

==== Major intersections ====
The entire route is in Ward County.

Location	mi	km	Destinations	Notes
	0.000	0.000	US 2 / US 52 / US 83 Byp. / Sundown Drive	Western terminus; west end of US 52 Bus. concurrency
Minot	2.108	3.392	US 83 (South Broadway)	
Minot	2.613	4.205	US 52 Bus. east (Valley Street SE) / Front Street SE	East end of US 52 Bus. concurrency
Minot city limit	5.865	9.439	US 2 – Williston, Devils Lake	Eastern terminus
1.000 mi = 1.609 km; 1.000 km = 0.621 mi: Concurrency terminus

=== Minot bypass route ===
U.S. Route 2 Bypass
- Location: Minot, North Dakota

=== Grand Forks–East Grand Forks business loop ===
U.S. Highway 2 Business
- Location: Grand Forks, North Dakota–East Grand Forks, Minnesota
- Length: 2.02 mi (3.25 km)

U.S. Highway 2 Business (US 2 Bus.) begins at US 2 in North Dakota near US 2's intersection with US 81 Bus. US 2 Bus. continues to the southeast, passing through the town square of Grand Forks, North Dakota, and intersecting North Dakota Highway 297 (ND 297). US 2 Bus. then enters Minnesota via the Sorlie Memorial Bridge over the Red River before terminating at US 2 in East Grand Forks.

==== Major intersections ====
State	County	Location	mi	km	Destinations	Notes
North Dakota	Grand Forks	Grand Forks	0.000	0.000	US 2 (Gateway Drive) / Mill Road	Western terminus
North Dakota	Grand Forks	Grand Forks	0.927	1.492	Demers Avenue (ND 297) / S 5th Street	Eastern terminus of ND 927
North Dakota	Grand Forks–Polk county line	Grand Forks–East Grand Forks city limit	1.202– 0.000	1.934– 0.000	Sorlie Memorial Bridge over Red River	
Minnesota	Polk	East Grand Forks city limit	0.818	1.316	US 2 (MN 220)	Eastern terminus
1.000 mi = 1.609 km; 1.000 km = 0.621 mi

=== Superior truck route ===
Truck U.S. Highway 2
- Location: Superior, Wisconsin
- Length: 2.5 mi (4.0 km)

Truck U.S. Highway 2 (Truck US 2) is a 2.5-mile-long (4.0 km) truck route used to divert heavy truck traffic out of downtown Superior, Wisconsin. It begins at a roundabout on US 2 and follows local streets bypassing downtown Superior to the north before meeting US 53 at an intersection. It runs concurrently with US 53 until the route meets back up with US 2.

Major intersections

The entire route is in Superior, Douglas County.

mi	km	Destinations	Notes
0.0	0.0	US 2 west	Western terminus
		WIS 35	
		US 53	Western end of US 53 concurrency
2.0	3.2	US 2 east	Eastern terminus; eastern end of US 53 concurrency
1.000 mi = 1.609 km; 1.000 km = 0.621 mi: Concurrency terminus

== Wisconsin ==
=== Ashland alternate route ===
Alternate U.S. Highway 2
- Location: Ashland, Wisconsin
- Length: 5.2 mi (8.4 km)

Alternate U.S. Highway 2 (Alt. US 2) in Ashland, Wisconsin, is an alternate route of US 2. Alt. US 2 begins at US 2 west of Ashland at the western terminus of State Trunk Highway 137 (WIS 137), heading west along WIS 137, as well as WIS 13 Alt., in a concurrency. After passing the intersection with Lindblad Road, Alt. US 2/WIS 13A/WIS 137 gains the name Gold Course Road, traveling west until the intersection with Sanborn Avenue in Ashland, where WIS 137 ends its concurrency at its eastern terminus. Alt. US 2/WIS 13A continue north along Sanborn Avenue/WIS 112, where Alt. US 2 ends at US 2.

==== Major intersections ====
County	Location	mi	km	Destinations	Notes
Bayfield	Eileen	0.0	0.0	US 2 (WIS 13 Alt. north) / Kanes Road – Ashland, Superior	Western terminus; west end of WIS 13 Alt. / WIS 137 concurrency; western terminus of WIS 137
Ashland	Ashland	4.8	7.7	WIS 112 south (Sanborn Avenue) / 6th Avenue	East end of WIS 137 concurrency; west end of WIS 112 concurrency; eastern terminus of WIS 137
Ashland	Ashland	5.2	8.4	US 2 (WIS 13 / Lake Shore Drive W)	Eastern terminus; east end of WIS 13 Alt. concurrency; southern terminus of WIS 13 Alt.
1.000 mi = 1.609 km; 1.000 km = 0.621 mi: Concurrency terminus

== Michgan ==
=== Ironwood business spur ===
Business US Highway 2
- Location: Ironwood, Michigan
- Length: 1.270 mi (2.044 km)
- Existed: August 1942–present

Business US Highway 2 (Bus. US 2) is a 1.27-mile (2.04 km) business route running through Ironwood, Michigan, to the Wisconsin state line on the Montreal River. The western terminus of Bus. US 2 is at the Wisconsin state line between Hurley, Wisconsin, and Ironwood on Silver Street. The eastern terminus is at the intersection with US 2 at the corner of Cloverland Drive and Douglas Street north of downtown.

The business route was created in August 1942 when former M‑54 in Ironwood was renumbered as a business loop of US 2. It was originally a bistate business connection before the Wisconsin Department of Transportation decommissioned Bus. US 2 in Hurley westward along State Trunk Highway 77 and northward along US 51 in 2002.

==== Major intersections ====
The entire route is in Ironwood, Gogebic County.

mi	km	Destinations	Notes
0.000	0.000	Silver Street	Western terminus at Wisconsin state line
1.720	2.768	US 2 (Cloverland Drive) / Douglas Boulevard – Ashland, Wakefield	Eastern terminus
1.000 mi = 1.609 km; 1.000 km = 0.621 mi

== Vermont ==
=== Montpelier business loop ===
U.S. Route 2 Business
- Location: Montpelier, Vermont
- Length: 0.687 mi (1,106 m)

U.S. Route 2 Business (US 2 Bus.) is a 0.687-mile (1.106 km) business route of US 2 located in Montpelier, Vermont. The route is coextensive with State Street and the lower half of Main Street. The road begins when US 2 east turns south to bypass downtown Montpelier. By following US 2 Bus., one will pass by the majority of the state offices, including the Vermont State House. However, this road is barely signed as being "US 2 Bus." and is even less referred to as such.

==== Major intersections ====
The entire route is in Montpelier, Washington County.

mi	km	Destinations	Notes
0.000	0.000	US 2 (State Street) / Bailey Street to I-89	Western terminus
0.5	0.80	VT 12 north (Main Street)	West end of VT 12 concurrency
0.687	1.106	US 2 (Memorial Drive / Berlin Street) / VT 12 south (Northfield Street) to I-89 / US 302 – East Montpelier, St. Johnsbury, Northfield	Eastern terminus; east end of VT 12 concurrency
1.000 mi = 1.609 km; 1.000 km = 0.621 mi: Concurrency terminus

=== St. Johnsbury truck route ===
U.S. Route 2 Truck
- Location: St. Johnsbury, Vermont
- Length: 7.0 mi (11.3 km)

U.S. Route 2 Truck (US 2 Truck) is a 7.0-mile-long (11.3 km) truck route used to divert heavy truck traffic around the town of St. Johnsbury, Vermont. It begins at an interchange with I-91 and US 2 in St. Johnsbury. It travels to the south-southeast, running concurrently with I-91, in the southern part of the city. The two routes have an interchange with US 5. Then, they cross over the Passumpsic River and leave the city limits of St. Johnsbury. They reach an interchange with I-93. At this interchange, US 2 Truck ends its concurrency with I-91 and begins one with I-93 to the northeast. I-93/US 2 Truck travel concurrently for one exit, an interchange with Vermont Route 18 (VT 18). At this interchange, US 2 Truck ends its concurrency with I-93 and begins a brief one with VT 18. The two highways have an intersection with US 2 on the northeastern edge of the city limits of St. Johnsbury. At this intersection, both US 2 Truck and VT 18 terminate.

Navigating a semitrailer truck through downtown St. Johnsbury via US 2 is tricky at best and dangerous at worst, with several sharp turns on narrow, downtown streets with one very steep grade involved on Eastern Avenue. The truck route was designated in an attempt to alleviate the truck traffic in the congested downtown area, which includes the campus of St. Johnsbury Academy, a private secondary school. St. Johnsbury officials still hope to persuade the state to increase weight limits on Interstates in an effort to keep 18-wheelers away from St. Johnsbury Academy. Selectmen contend heavy trucks passing through the Academy campus present a danger to students, and a nuisance for drivers.

Since the truck route utilizes two Interstate Highways, the maximum weight limit allowed was the same as the Interstates in Vermont, which was 80,000 pounds (36,000 kg). This posed a problem for local trucks loaded with logs and wood chips. Their weight typically exceeds Interstate limits but is still within the limits for state and U.S. highways. This created a situation where the most dangerous and difficult-to-handle trucks were forced to use the main US 2 route through downtown St. Johnsbury. Signs at the junctions of US 2 Truck and US 2 warned commercial drivers that the weight limits were limited to those on the Interstate Highway System. Federal legislation authored by U.S. Senator Patrick Leahy (D-VT) included Vermont in a pilot program to allow Interstate weight limits to be increased for a period of one year, with evaluation of the program to follow. Vermont's state legislature quickly authored a measure to allow the heavier limits, which was signed into law by the governor on January 13, 2010.

Major intersections

The entire route is in Caledonia County.

Location	mi	km	Exit	Destinations	Notes
St. Johnsbury	0.0	0.0	21	I-91 north / US 2 – Lyndonville, Danville	Western terminus; western end of I-91 concurrency
St. Johnsbury	1.8	2.9	20	US 5 – Barnet	
St. Johnsbury	2.4	3.9	19	I-91 south / I-93 south – White River Junction	Eastern end of I-91 concurrency; northern terminus of I-93; western end of I-93 concurrency
Waterford	6.3	10.1	1	I-93 / VT 18 north – Waterford	Eastern end of I-93 concurrency; western end of VT 18 concurrency
St. Johnsbury	7.0	11.3		VT 18 south / US 2 (Theodore Roosevelt Highway) – Kirby	Eastern terminus; northern terminus of VT 18; eastern end of VT 18 concurrency
1.000 mi = 1.609 km; 1.000 km = 0.621 mi: Concurrency terminus

== Maine ==
=== Orono–Old Town alternate route ===
U.S. Route 2A
- Location: Orono–Old Town, Maine
- Length: 4.57 mi (7.35 km)

U.S. Route 2A (US 2A), also known as U.S. Route 2 Alternate (US 2 Alt.), in Orono and Old Town, Maine, is a 4.5-mile (7.2 km) alternate route of US 2, which connects it to the University of Maine. At its southern terminus near downtown Orono, the route splits from US 2 to follow College Avenue, then turns onto Stillwater Avenue to reach Old Town. The northern terminus is at the intersection of Center Street (US 2A) and Main Street (US 2) in downtown Old Town, where US 2A rejoins US 2 to cross the Penobscot River into Milford, while Main Street continues north in Old Town as State Route 43.

The entire route is in Penobscot County.

Location	mi	km	Destinations	Notes
Orono	0.00	0.00	US 2 (N Main Street / Park Street) – Old Town, Bangor	Western terminus
Old Town	4.57	7.35	US 2 (Center Street) / SR 43 west (Main Street) – Milford, Orono, Hudson	Eastern terminus; eastern terminus of SR 43
1.000 mi = 1.609 km; 1.000 km = 0.621 mi

=== Aroostook County alternate route ===
U.S. Route 2A
- Location: Aroostook County, Maine
- Length: 47.77 mi (76.88 km)

U.S. Route 2A (US 2A), also known as U.S. Route 2 Alternate (US 2 Alt.), is a 47.77-mile (76.88 km) alternate route that runs from US 2 in Macwahoc Plantation, Maine, to US 2 and US 1 in Houlton.

Unlike US 2, which runs north from Macwahoc Plantation and parallels Interstate 95 (I-95) from Sherman to Houlton, US 2A veers to the south and east to serve an isolated area of the state. It is also the Haynesville Woods road made famous by country music singer Dick Curless in his song "A Tombstone Every Mile".

==== Major intersections ====
The entire route is in Aroostook County.

Location	mi	km	Destinations	Notes
Macwahoc Plantation	0.00	0.00	US 2 (Houlton Road) – Lincoln, Island Falls, Patten	Western terminus
Reed Plantation	13.27	21.36	SR 171 south – Wytopitlock	Northern terminus of SR 171
Houlton	47.77	76.88	US 1 / US 2 – Woodstock N.B., Mars Hill, Island Falls, Calais	Eastern terminus
1.000 mi = 1.609 km; 1.000 km = 0.621 mi

Browse numbered routes
← US 2	ME	→ SR 3

== See also ==
- List of special routes of the United States Numbered Highway System
