= Edwin E. Lewis =

American architect (1846–1928)

- Born: 1846; Cornish, New Hampshire
- Died: 1928 (aged 81–82); Gardiner, Maine
- Occupation: Architect

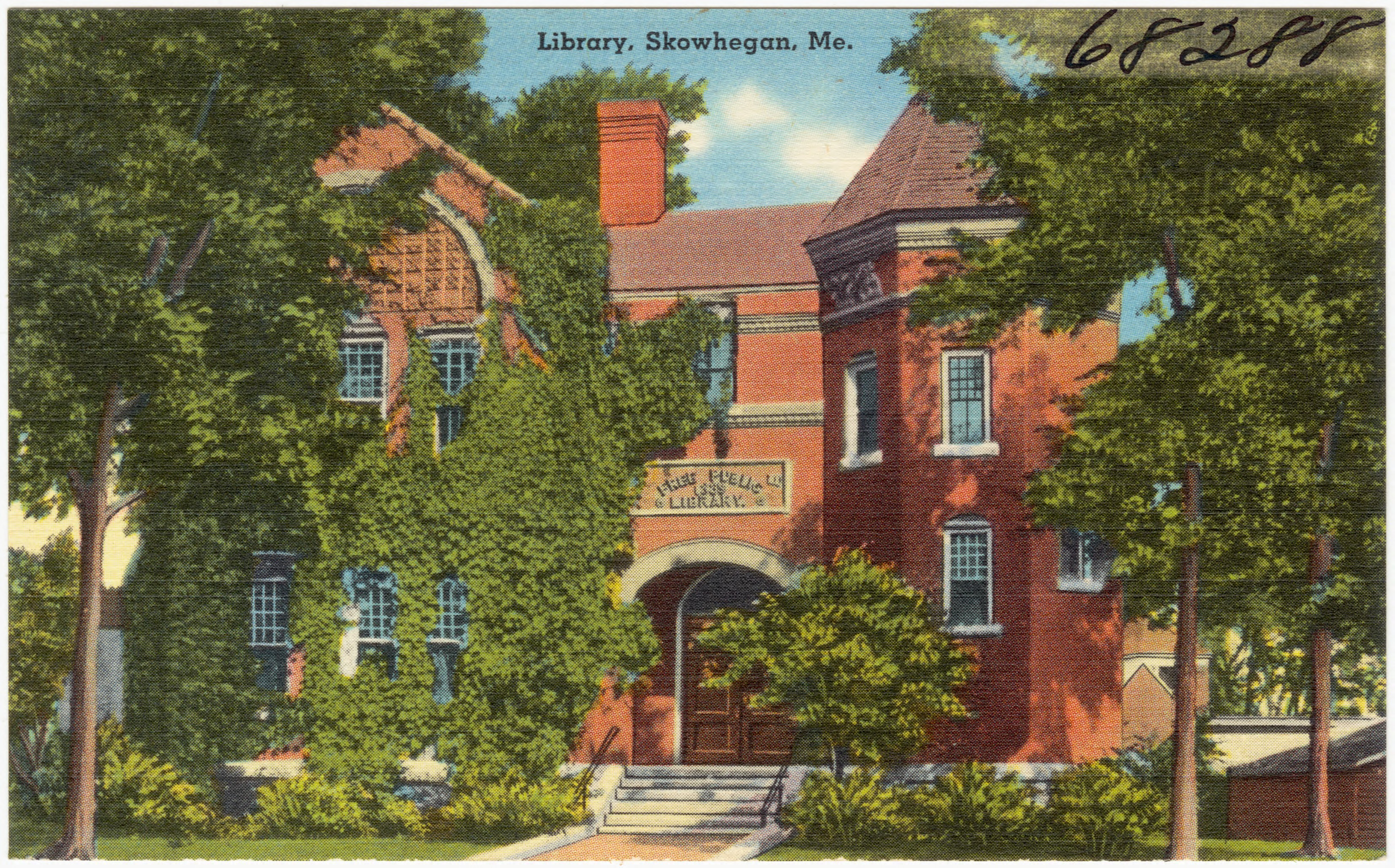
Free Public Library, Skowhegan, 1889.

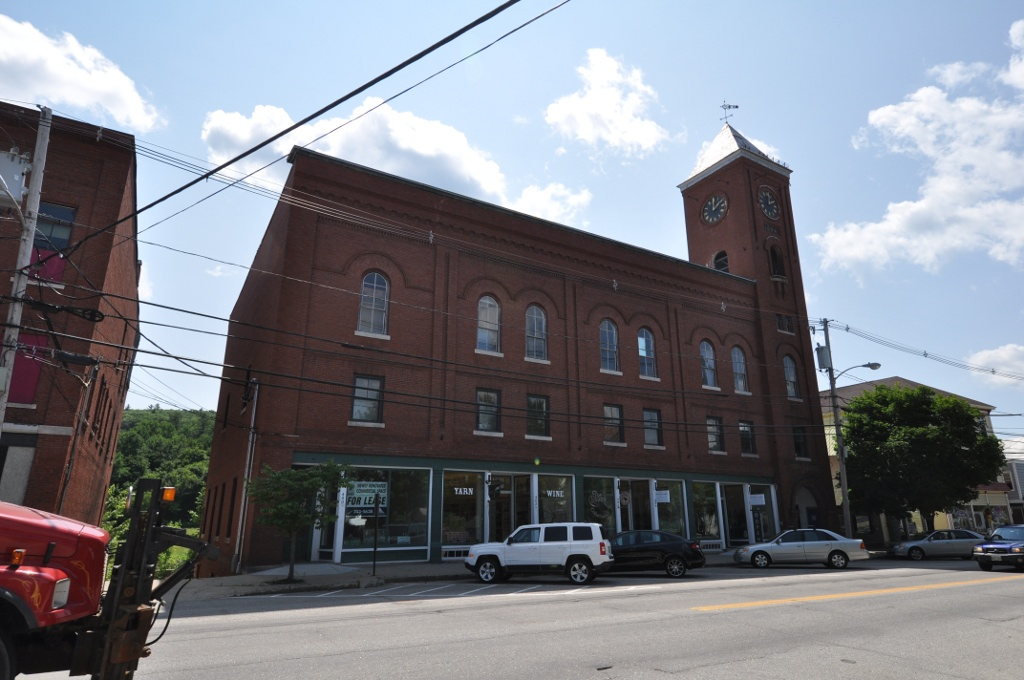
Opera House Block, Norway, 1894.

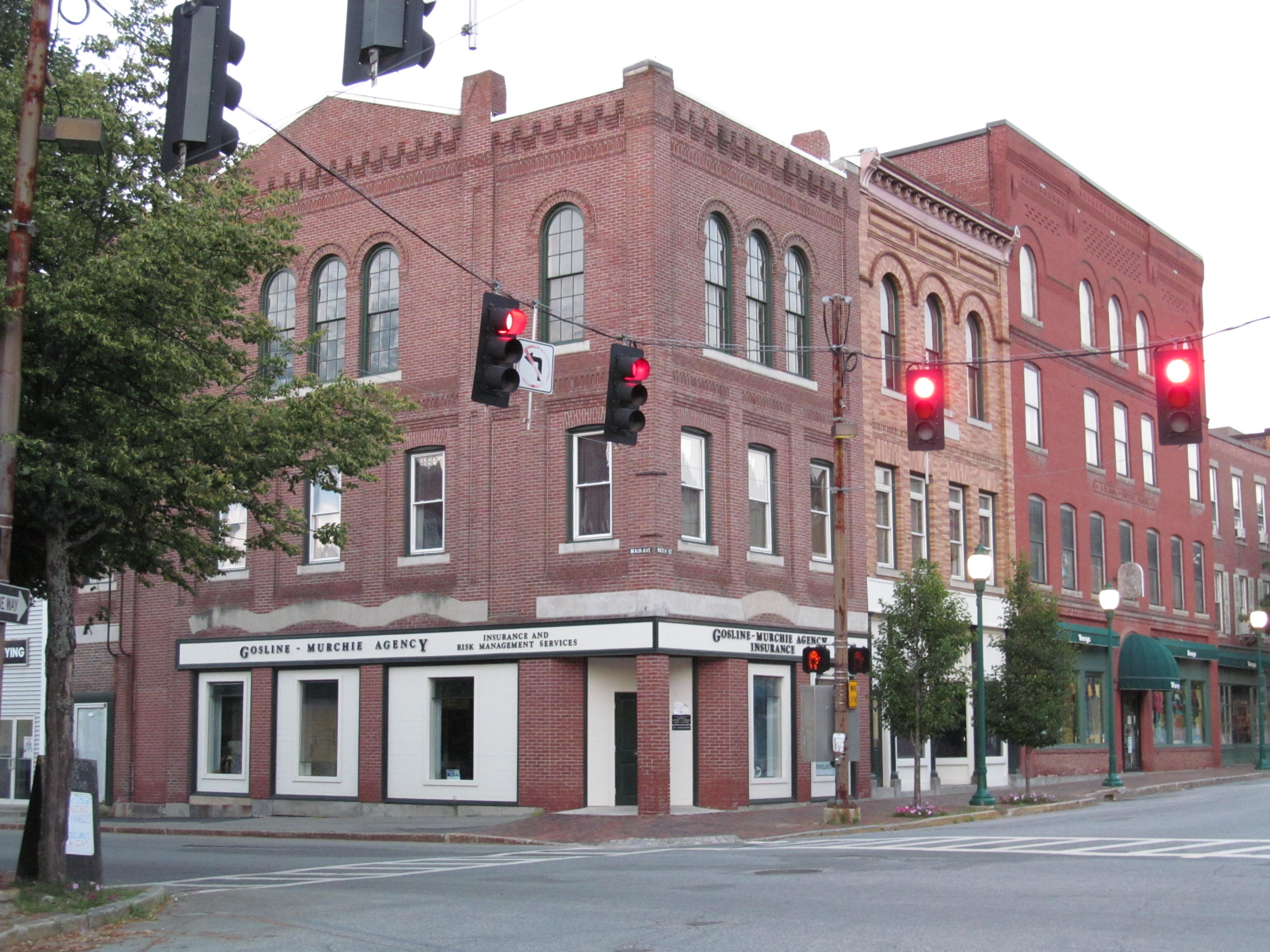
Patten Block (at right), Gardiner, 1896.

Edwin E. Lewis (1846–1928) was an American architect from Gardiner, Maine.

== Life and career ==
Lewis was born in Cornish, New Hampshire in 1846. His family later moved to Croydon, and then Claremont. In February 1865, at the age of 19, he enlisted in the Union Army. He returned to Claremont later that year, where he became a carpenter. He married in 1866. He and his wife later moved to Keene, and then to Gardiner in 1875. There he practiced as a contractor, and became known for the designs he built. In 1883 he received his first architectural commission, a building in Richmond. The following year he opened an architectural office in Gardiner.

Lewis practiced until November 1897. He was then appointed Chief Engineer and General Superintendent of Construction at Togus, probably due to the extensive work he had done there while in private practice. He retired from that position in 1917, and died in 1928.

== Works ==
- 1884 - Gardiner Coliseum, Maine Ave, Gardiner, Maine Demolished.
- 1885 - William Kane House, 18 Vine St, Gardiner, Maine
- 1887 - Crosby Inn, Main & Franklin Sts, Belfast, Maine Burned in 1896.
- 1887 - Masonic Block, 153 Main St, Farmington, Maine
- 1889 - Calais National Bank Building, 345 Main St, Calais, Maine
- 1889 - Central Street Intermediate School, 8 Cherry St, Gardiner, Maine
- 1889 - Gardiner Congregational Church, 15 Brunswick Ave, Gardiner, Maine Burned in 1915.
- 1889 - Skowhegan Free Public Library, 9 Elm St, Skowhegan, Maine
- 1890 - Charles E. Littlefield House, 96 Limerock St, Rockland, Maine
- 1890 - Masonic Building, 16 Common St, Waterville, Maine
- 1890 - William M. Shaw House, 40 Norris St, Greenville, Maine
- 1890 - Union Hall, 18 Central St, Danforth, Maine
- 1891 - Gardiner Savings Institution Building, 190 Water St, Gardiner, Maine Demolished in 1954.
- 1891 - Opera House Block, Main & Lincoln Sts, Dover-Foxcroft, Maine Demolished.
- 1892 - Madison Congregational Church, 124 Main St, Madison, Maine
- 1892 - Shaw Block, 20 Congress St, Rumford, Maine Demolished.
- 1892 - Winthrop Congregational Church, 10 Bosdoin St, Winthrop, Maine
- 1894 - First Baptist Church, 46 Court St, Houlton, Maine
- 1894 - Opera House Block, 414 Main St, Norway, Maine
- 1896 - Patten Block, 185 Water St, Gardiner, Maine
- 1896 - Plummer Street Intermediate School, 12 Plummer St, Gardiner, Maine
- 1897 - Masonic Block, 169 Water St, Gardiner, Maine Demolished.
- 1897 - Myrtle Street School, Myrtle St, Waterville, Maine Burned in 1981.
