= Danforth (CDP), Maine =

Danforth, Maine
- Census-designated place
- Location within Maine Location within the United States
- Coordinates: 45°39′32″N 67°52′25″W
- Country: United States
- State: Maine
- County: Washington
- Town: Danforth

Area
  - Total: 2.53 sq mi (6.54 km^{2})
  - Land: 2.47 sq mi (6.41 km^{2})
  - Water: 0.046 sq mi (0.12 km^{2})
- Elevation: 374 ft (114 m)

Population (2020)
  - Total: 331
  - Density: 133.7/sq mi (51.61/km^{2})
- Time zone: UTC-5 (Eastern (EST))
  - Summer (DST): UTC-4 (EDT)
- ZIP Code: 04424
- Area code: 207
- FIPS code: 23-16375
- GNIS feature ID: 2806291

Danforth is a census-designated place (CDP) and the primary village in the town of Danforth, Washington County, Maine, United States. It is in northernmost Washington County, in the northern part of the town of Danforth, and is bordered to the north by the town of Weston in Aroostook County. The village is located on Baskahegan Stream where it originates at the outlet of Crooked Brook Flowage. The Baskahegan is a northwest-flowing tributary of the Mattawamkeag River and part of the Penobscot River watershed.

U.S. Route 1 passes through the eastern side of the village, leading north 34 miles (55 km) to Houlton and southeast 56 miles (90 km) to Calais. State Route 169 runs southwest from Danforth 24 miles (39 km) to State Route 6 in Springfield.

Danforth was first listed as a CDP prior to the 2020 census.

== Demographics ==
Historical population
Census	Pop.	Note	%±
2020	331		—
U.S. Decennial Census

== Education ==
It is in the School Administrative District 14. The PreK-12 school of that district is the East Grand School.
