= Maine State Route 169 =

State highway in Maine, US

State Route 169

Route information
- Maintained by MaineDOT
- Length: 24.23 mi (38.99 km)

Major junctions
- South end: SR 6 / SR 170 in Springfield
- SR 171 in Prentiss
- North end: US 1 in Danforth

Location
- Country: United States
- State: Maine
- Counties: Penobscot, Washington

Highway system
- Maine State Highway System; Interstate; US; State; Auto trails; Lettered highways
| ← SR 168 | → SR 170 |

State Route 169 (SR 169) is a 24.23-mile-long (38.99 km) state highway from SR 6 in Springfield to U.S. Route 1 (US 1) in Danforth. It runs concurrently with SR 170 for its first 3.3 miles (5.3 km) and intersects SR 171 in the unincorporated territory of Prentiss.

== Major junctions ==
| County | Location | mi | km | Destinations | Notes |
|---|---|---|---|---|---|
| Penobscot | Springfield | 0.00 | 0.00 | SR 6 (Main Street) / SR 170 begins / Shep Road – Topsfield, Lincoln | Southern end of SR 170 concurrency |
| Penobscot | Springfield | 3.68 | 5.92 | SR 170 north – Kingman | Northern end of SR 170 concurrency |
| Penobscot | Prentiss | 7.57 | 12.18 | SR 171 north (Center Street) – Wytopitlock | Southern terminus of SR 171 |
| Washington | Danforth | 24.23 | 38.99 | US 1 (Houlton Road) / Depot Street – Topsfield, Calais, Houlton | |
1.000 mi = 1.609 km; 1.000 km = 0.621 mi: Concurrency terminus
