= Baxter Preserve =

Protected area in New York, US

Coordinates: 41°20′18″N 73°34′42″W

Baxter Preserve is an area of open space in North Salem, New York, United States. It consists of two segments, Baxter South and Baxter North. The preserve has become very popular in the region since being donated.

== Baxter South ==
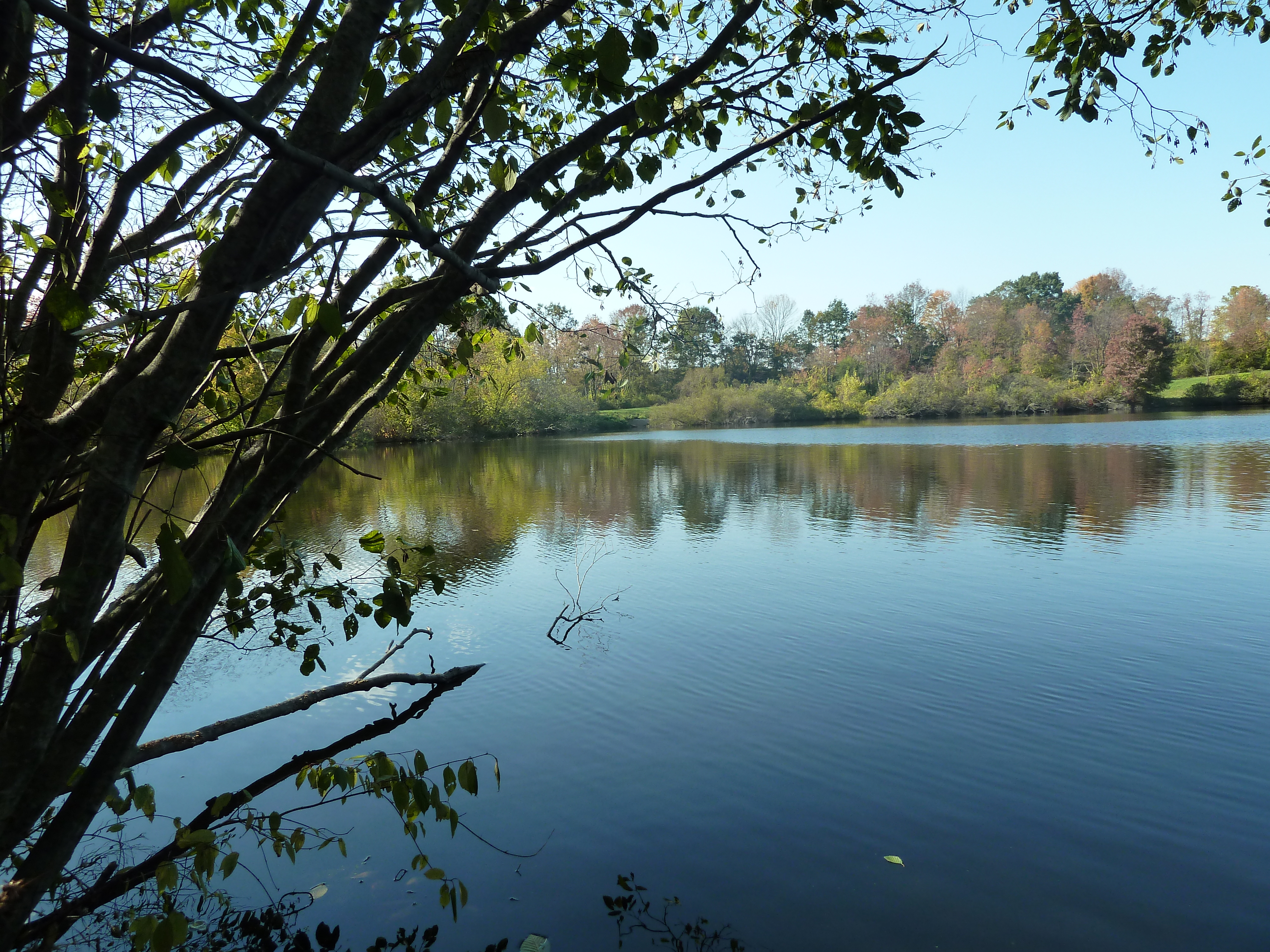
The lake in Baxter South

Baxter South land was donated to the North Salem Open Land Foundation (NSOLF) in 1979 by "The Baxter Road Group" and is by far the most popular and well-used of all the parcels owned by the NSOLF. Baxter South includes a large pond surrounded by the remains of a racetrack, and many trails, which are well traveled by people on foot and horseback. Many of these trails are lined with apple, black cherry, cottonwood, and maple trees.

=== History ===
The original 1979 parcel consisted of 114 acres (46 ha) on the south side of Baxter Road, but in 1985, the "Baxter 1981 Associates" donated an adjacent 15 acres (6.1 ha), bringing the total acreage to 129 acres (52 ha).

== Baxter North ==
Directly opposite the Baxter South Parcel, Baxter North is a smaller area of 37 acres (15 ha), which was donated by the Baxter Road Group in 1980. It consists of a high meadow with a stand of trees at the northwest end and is an excellent spot for looking over the Baxter South parcel to the Titicus Reservoir.
