= Springfield Congregational Church =

Historic church in Maine, United States

- U.S. National Register of Historic Places
- Location within Maine Location within the United States
- Location: ME 6, Springfield, Maine
- Coordinates: 45°23′45″N 68°8′16″W
- Area: 0.5 acres (0.20 ha)
- Built: 1852
- Architectural style: Gothic Revival
- NRHP reference No.: 78000193
- Added to NRHP: December 22, 1978

The Springfield Congregational Church is a historic church on Maine State Route 6 in Springfield, Maine. Built in 1852, it is Gothic Revival building noted for its elegance and high quality despite its rural setting. The building was listed on the National Register of Historic Places in 1978.

== Description and history ==
The Springfield Congregational Church is set in Springfield's rural village center, on the north side of Route 6, a short way west of its junction with Maine State Route 169. It is a single-story wood-frame structure, with a front-facing gable roof, board-and-batten siding, and a granite foundation. A square three-stage tower, with buttress-like corners, rises at the southeast corner. The center of the main facade has a tripartite Gothic window rising into the main gable, and the main entrance is at the base of the tower, set in a Gothic arch. The second stage of the tower has Gothic windows, and the third has a trefoil design on each face. An open belfry stands above, with posts at the corners that are topped by a pinnacles joined by an ornate railing. The sides of the church have five Gothic arched windows. The interior of the church is noted for open trusswork supporting the roof, although this was at some time enclosed by a suspended ceiling.

The town of Springfield, founded in 1830, is set in a rural part of eastern Penobscot County that has never developed beyond a basically agrarian economy. The congregation was established in 1846 and built this church in 1852 for $2500. The congregation has always been small, and was briefly disbanded during the Great Depression, and has also shared a minister with a neighboring congregation in Lincoln. Electricity was introduced into the building in 1946. The building's architect is unknown.

== See also ==
- National Register of Historic Places listings in Penobscot County, Maine
