= William M. Shaw House =

Historic house in Maine, United States

- U.S. National Register of Historic Places
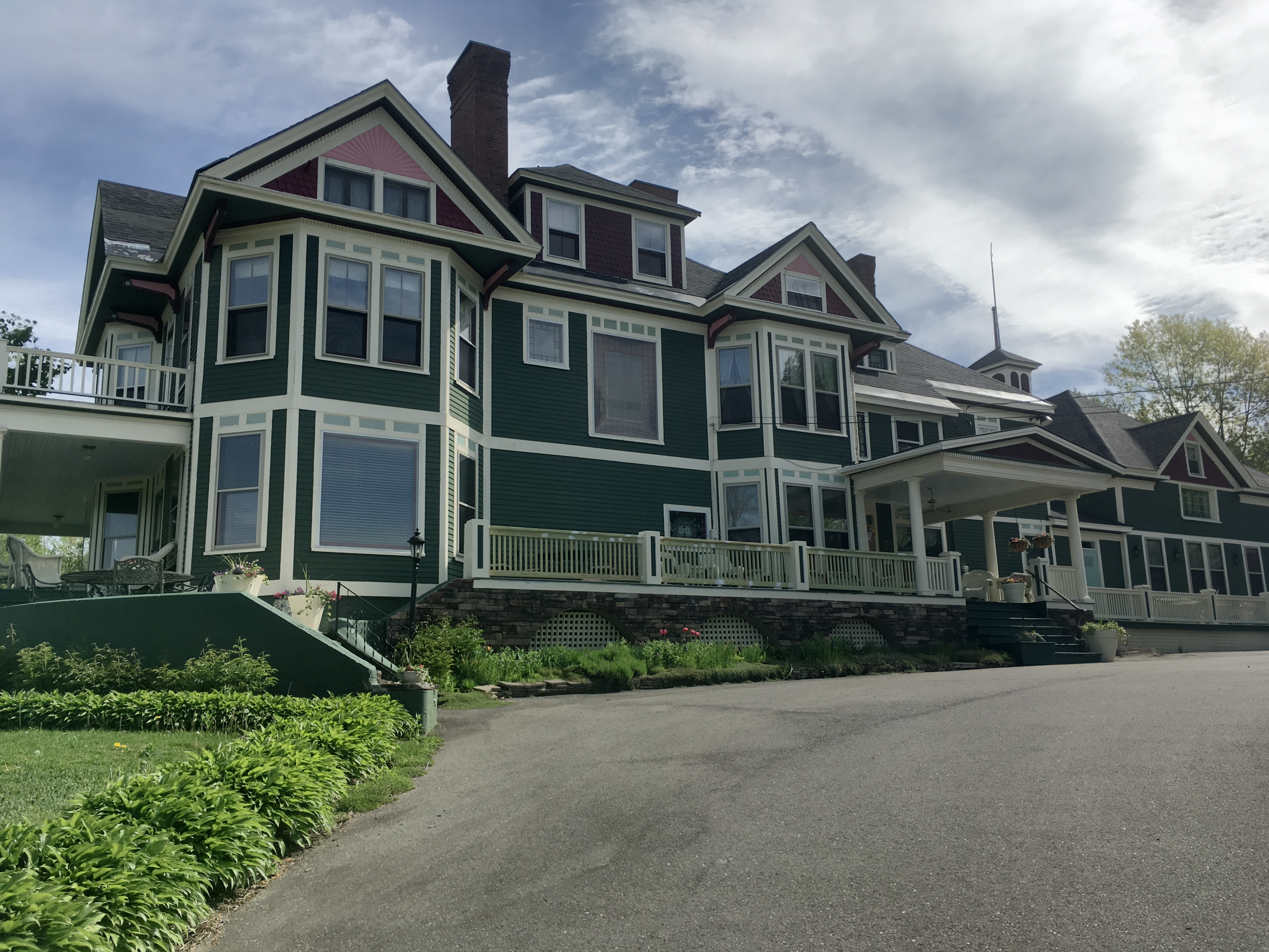

- Location within Maine Location within the United States
- Location: 40 Norris St., Greenville, Maine
- Coordinates: 45°27′35″N 69°35′12″W
- Area: 4.5 acres (1.8 ha)
- Built: 1890
- Architect: Edwin E. Lewis; Wilfred E. Mansur
- NRHP reference No.: 13000867
- Added to NRHP: October 16, 2013

The William M. Shaw House is a historic house located at 40 Norris Street in Greenville, Maine, which now houses the Greenville Inn. Built in 1895, it is a handsome and elaborate example of Queen Anne architecture in a rural small-town setting. The house was designed by Edwin E. Lewis of Gardiner, with alterations by Wilfred E. Mansur of Bangor. The house was listed on the National Register of Historic Places in 2013 for its architecture, and for its association with William Shaw, a leading lumber businessman active in Greenville in the late 19th and early 20th centuries, whose business interests also included ownership of the steamer Katahdin.

== Description and history ==
The Shaw House is set on a hill a short way south of Greenville's central business district, which is at the southern tip of Moosehead Lake. The 4.5-acre (1.8 ha) property includes, in addition to the main house, a period carriage house and six guest cottages built when the property was converted to an inn. The house is a large, basically rectangular, block, facing Norris Street to the south and connected to the carriage house to the east. It has a hip roof that is studded on the south with two projecting gable sections and on each on the west and north side. A hip-roof dormer projects from the roof between the gable sections on the south. The projecting gable sections top polygonal bays, and have closed pediments with paired sash windows at the center, surrounded by a field of decorative cut wood shingles. There is a single-story porch on the west end, supported by round columns, with a balustraded second level. A single-story open porch also runs along most of the south facade, up to a porte-cochère style main entrance near the back of the original main block, where it meets the ell connecting the house to the carriage house.

William M. Shaw (1861-1936) was a leading lumber businessman in Greenville. He operated a saw mill, lumber yard, and retail store in the center of town, and his M. G. Shaw Company owner large tracts of timberland. The Shaw Company also operated the steamer Katahdin, which not only hauled lumber across the lake, but also ferried passengers to the Mount Kineo Resort area. Shaw hired Gardiner-based architect Edwin. E. Lewis to design his home, which was built starting in about 1890, and is one of the most opulent houses in Piscataquis County. The house underwent major expansion around 1905, designed by Bangor architect Wilfred E. Mansur, who Shaw had also hired to build his office building in the town as well as the commercial Shaw Block. Mansur's alterations included a substantial enlargement of the carriage house and construction of the ell joining the main house. The house was converted for use as an inn in the mid-20th century, at which time two of the property's cabins were built. The other cabins are all late-20th century additions.

== See also ==
- National Register of Historic Places listings in Piscataquis County, Maine
