= North Salem, New York =

- Town
- Town of North Salem
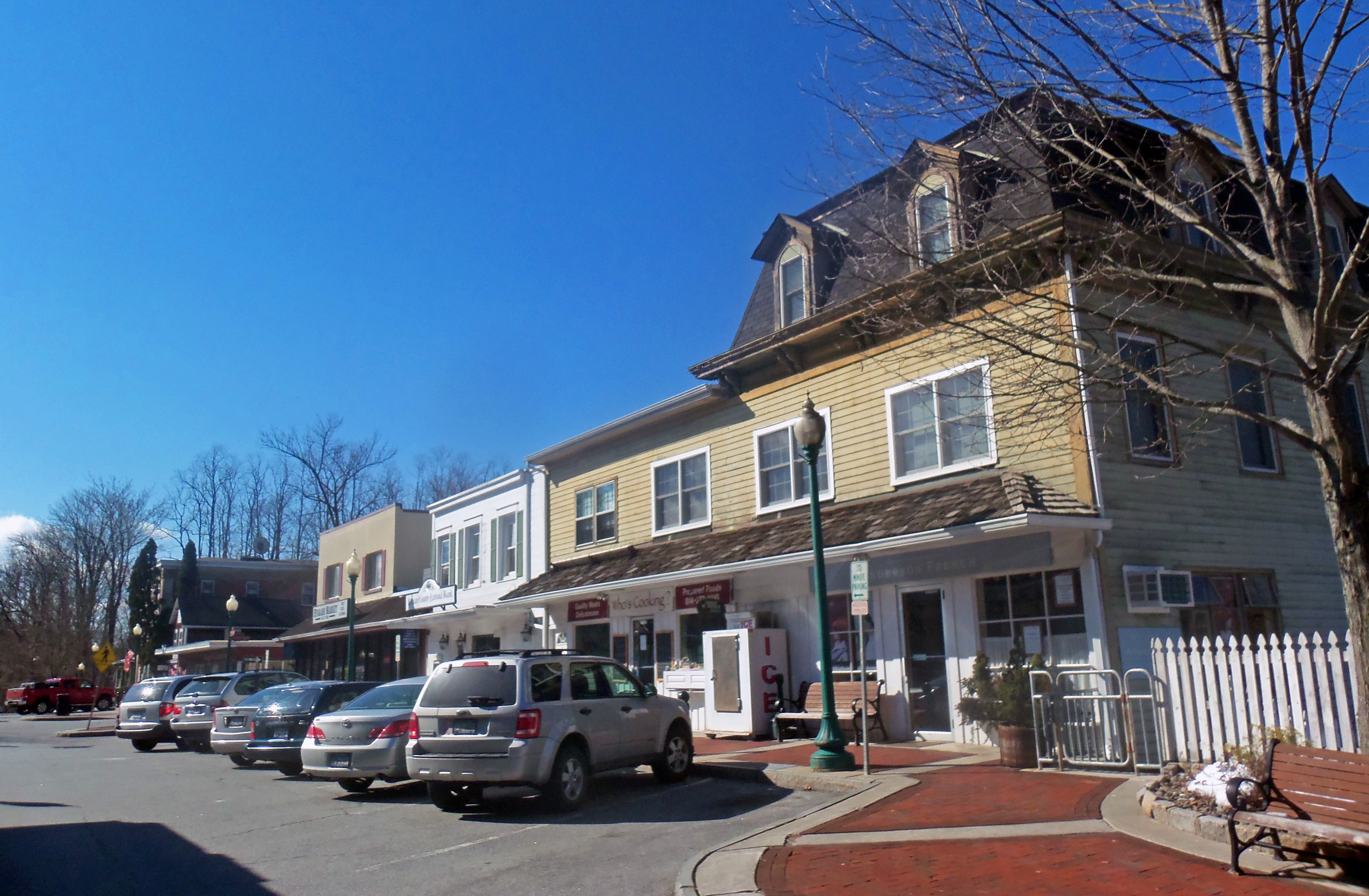
- Downtown Croton Falls, a hamlet within the town

- Seal

- Location of North Salem, New York
- Coordinates: 41°19′41″N 73°36′47″W
- Country: United States
- State: New York
- County: Westchester
- Incorporated: 1788

Government
  - Town Supervisor: Warren Lucas (R)

Area
  - Total: 22.939 sq mi (59.41 km^{2})
  - Land: 21.369 sq mi (55.35 km^{2})
  - Water: 1.57 sq mi (4.1 km^{2})
- Elevation: 338 ft (103 m)

Population (2020)
  - Total: 5,243
  - Estimate (2021): 5,195
  - Density: 245.3/sq mi (94.72/km^{2})
- Time zone: UTC-5 (Eastern (EST))
  - Summer (DST): UTC-4 (EDT)
- ZIP code: 10560
- Area code: 914
- FIPS code: 36-53517
- GNIS feature ID: 0979292
- Website: www.northsalemny.org

North Salem is the northernmost town in Westchester County, New York, United States. The town, incorporated in 1788, is a suburb of New York City, located approximately 50 miles north of Midtown Manhattan. As of the 2020 census, North Salem was recorded as possessing a population of 5,243 people living on a land area of 21.37 square miles.

North Salem contains an amalgamation of urban and rural features, including parks, forests, lakes, and horse trails alongside commuter train service and an interstate highway. The town has been referred to as "Billionaires' Dirt Road" due to the town's rural characteristics and its relatively high proportion of wealthy residents.

== History ==
=== Before the American Revolution ===
The land which currently comprises North Salem has been inhabited for about 12,000 years. Prior to the American Revolution, the territory was home to the Algonquian peoples, who lived in the village of Pequenakonck, where the hamlet of Peach Lake is today. Dutch explorers entered the area in the 1600s; towards the end of the seventeenth century, the land became the property of Stephanus Van Cortlandt, a wealthy New York politician, alongside a significant portion of what is today northern Westchester County.

Permanent European settlement began in the early 1700s. By the late Colonial Era, a single municipality, Salem, had been established in the area, its borders including both future North and South Salem.

=== Revolutionary Era ===
Circa 1760, Van Cortlandt grandson Stephen De Lancey constructed a manor house on the banks of the Titicus River. As De Lancey was a Tory, he sold the building when he returned to England during the Revolutionary War. It later was used as a school, the North Salem Academy and in 1890 was purchased by the Town of North Salem and became the town hall.

After the breakout of the American Revolutionary War in 1776, town residents sided with the revolutionary cause. On September 22, 1780, amidst the war, John Paulding and Isaac Van Wart left from what was later known as the Yerkes Tavern, joined by David Williams. Their expedition resulted in the capture of the British spy Major John André. The foundation of Yerkes (Yerks) Tavern is all that is left of the historic building, once at the intersection of Yerkes Road and Bogtown Road. A historic plaque posted on the site reads:

On this site stood one of North Salem's early taverns. Its proprietor was John Yerkes, who received a license from the town "to operate a tavern or inn for the accommodation and entertainment of travelers" in 1815. Early records indicate that this property was owned by the Smith family prior to this date.

In late May 1784, soon after the end of the American Revolution, Salem split into two towns. What would become known as North Salem was known as Upper Salem for about four years after the split, until an act of the New York State Legislature in 1788 gave the town its modern name.

=== Nineteenth Century ===
The 1800 United States Census recorded several hundred enslaved individuals being held in North Salem. New York State began operating under a policy of gradual abolition in 1799, with full abolition in 1827; the practice of slavery in North Salem can therefore be estimated to have come to an end sometime between the years 1800 and 1827.

The Great Blizzard of 1888, which impacted communities across the northeastern United States, seriously disrupted agricultural production in North Salem and prevented train movement. It took over a week after the storm to restore roads and trains to operational order.

In 1893, the Titicus Reservoir began serving the New York City water supply. Today, the reservoir is stocked with brown trout each spring and fishing from rowboats is permitted.

=== Modern History ===
In 1932, the North Salem Free Library was established in the North Salem Town House. It was formally chartered by the State of New York in 1952 and later renamed the Ruth Keeler Memorial Library. Its current building was constructed in 1980 and renovated most recently in 2003.

The town experienced a population boom around the middle of the twentieth century, nearly tripling in size between the 1940 and 1980 U.S. Censuses. Beginning in the late 1960s, Interstate 684 was constructed through North Salem. When finished in 1974, the new interstate included an exit on Hardscrabble Road.

North Salem's Union Hall was added to the National Register of Historic Places in 1986.

In 2015, a small Cessna aircraft crashed into the Titicus Reservoir, killing both passengers.

== Geography ==
North Salem, NY

Climate chart (precipitation, max. and min. temperature)
J	F	M	A	M	J	J	A	S	O	N	D
3.4 36 19	2.8 39 20	3.9 47 27	3.8 59 37	3.7 70 47	4.1 78 57	4.4 83 62	4.2 81 61	4.8 74 53	4.5 63 41	4 51 31	4.2 41 24
- █ Average max. and min. temperatures in °F
- █ Precipitation totals in inches
- Source: https://www.timeanddate.com/weather/@5129201/climate
Metric conversion
J	F	M	A	M	J	J	A	S	O	N	D
85 2 −7	71 4 −7	100 8 −3	96 15 3	93 21 8	104 26 14	113 28 17	106 27 16	123 23 12	114 17 5	101 11 −1	107 5 −4
- █ Average max. and min. temperatures in °C
- █ Precipitation totals in mm

=== Physical Geography ===
North Salem is located in a humid continental climate on the Köppen climate classification, and is classified by the United States Department of Agriculture as being in plant hardiness zone 6b. In extreme circumstances, winter temperature lows may reach −5 °F (−21 °C).

A geographic curiosity of North Salem is the so-called Standing Rock, a granite boulder sitting on several smaller stones. Since the boulder is not consistent with the geographic surroundings, it has been hypothesized that the rock was deposited by glaciers during the Last Ice Age, although others argue that it may have been moved and placed by Vikings or Native Americans.

=== Political Geography ===
North Salem has a total area of 22.939 square miles (59.41 km^{2}), of which 21.37 square miles (55.3 km^{2}) is land and 1.57 square miles (4.1 km^{2}) is water. As the northeasternmost town in Westchester County, North Salem is abutted by Putnam County, New York to the north and the State of Connecticut to the east.

North Salem contains both Mountain Lakes Park, a park owned and managed by Westchester County, as well as the smaller Baxter Preserve, which belongs to the North Salem Open Land Foundation.

== Demographics ==
Historical population
Census	Pop.	Note	%±
1790	1,058		—
1820	1,480		—
1830	1,276		−13.8%
1840	1,161		−9.0%
1850	1,335		15.0%
1860	1,497		12.1%
1870	1,754		17.2%
1880	1,693		−3.5%
1890	1,730		2.2%
1900	1,133		−34.5%
1910	1,258		11.0%
1920	934		−25.8%
1930	1,128		20.8%
1940	1,194		5.9%
1950	1,622		35.8%
1960	2,345		44.6%
1970	3,828		63.2%
1980	4,569		19.4%
1990	4,725		3.4%
2000	5,173		9.5%
2010	5,104		−1.3%
2020	5,243		2.7%
2021 (est.)	5,195		−0.9%
U.S. Decennial Census

North Salem is relatively sparsely populated, with a total population of 5,243 people living in a population density of 245 people per square mile.

Approximately 1-in-5 North Salem residents is 65 or older. Just shy of 1-in-4 North Salem residents is under 18. The average household in North Salem has 3.23 members, slightly above the average for Westchester County.

=== Fiscal Demographics ===
North Salem has a median household income of $180,000 and a poverty rate of 2.5%, making it financially better off than Westchester County as a whole. Approximately 80% of North Salem households own their homes, with the median home value estimated to fall in between $500,000 and $1,000,000.

=== Ethnicity and Nationality ===
One-in-five residents of North Salem speaks a language other than English at home. Of residents who speak a language other than English at home, a quarter speak Spanish, half speak an Indo-European language other than English or Spanish, and the remainder speak a non-Indo-European language.

North Salem is relatively racially homogenous; as of the 2020 Census, 84% of North Salem residents were white, 11% were Latino, 2% were Black, 2% were Asian, were 4% are of another race. The Census also recorded a small number of Indigenous individuals who made up less than 1% of the population. 8% of residents were biracial.

Approximately 14% of North Salem residents were born outside of the United States, most of whom are naturalized U.S. citizens.

== Education ==
Most of North Salem is in the North Salem Central School District, which serves approximately 963 pupils.

North Salem Middle School/High School is located on June Road in North Salem. The high school has a four year graduation rate of 98%, and was distinguished as a Blue Ribbon School for high levels of educational achievement by the United States Department of Education in 2004.

Pequenakonck Elementary School, located 0.3 miles (0.5 km) away from the middle school/high school, serves grades K-5. The middle school, which shares the same building as the high school, serves grades 6–8. The school is particularly small, with about 90 children on average per grade.

== Town government ==
North Salem's town government consists of a town supervisor and four town board members. The supervisor serves a two-year term, and the board members serve four-year terms. Elections are staggered such that in any given election year, the supervisor and two board members' seats will be up for election.

North Salem government
Position elected	Name	Year first elected	Political affiliation	Year next up for election
Town Supervisor	Warren Lucas	2009	R	2025
Town Council Member	Peter Kamenstein	2009	R	2025
Town Council Member	Katherine Daniels	2020	D	2027
Town Council Member	Brent Golisano	2015	R	2027
Town Council Member	Martin Aronchick	2011*	D	2025

*Aronchick first won his seat in 2011, lost it in 2015 to Lisa Douglas, and won a seat back in 2016 in a special election.

The town is part of New York's Eighteenth Congressional District, represented by Mike Lawler, a Republican. First elected in 2009, Warren Lucas, a Republican, serves as North Salem's Town Supervisor.

Registration and Party Enrollment Statistics as of 2024
Party	Active voters	Inactive voters	Total voters	Percentage
Democratic	1,429	132	1,561	36.84%
Republican	1,129	104	1,233	29.10%
Unaffiliated	1,133	103	1,236	29.18%
Minor parties	187	20	207	4.88%
Total	3,878	359	4,237	100%

North Salem town vote by party in presidential elections
Year	Democratic	Republican	Third Parties
2020	56.31% 1,719	41.80% 1,276	1.89% 58
2016	49.97% 1,386	44.63% 1,238	5.40% 150
2012	46.55% 1,194	52.13% 1,337	1.32% 34
2008	50.83% 1,388	47.71% 1,303	1.46% 40
2004	47.08% 1,295	51.21% 1,409	1.71% 47
2000	43.81% 1,132	50.16% 1,296	6.03% 156
1868	22.65% 77	77.35% 263	0.00% 0
1860	25.40% 80	74.60% 235	0.00% 0

== Hamlets ==
North Salem contains several hamlets, internal communities within the town which do not possess their own political representation or governance.

- Croton Falls, New York – a hamlet in the northwest corner of the town, with the Croton Falls station of Metro-North
- Grants Corner – a hamlet southeast of North Salem
- North Salem – a hamlet in the western part of the town. The North Salem Town Hall was added to the National Register of Historic Places in 1980.
- Salem Center – a hamlet at the eastern end of Titicus Reservoir. The fictitious headquarters of the X-Men Marvel Comics superhero team is located in Salem Center.
- Purdys – a hamlet south of Croton Falls, with the Purdy's station of Metro-North. The Joseph Purdy Homestead was added to the National Register of Historic Places in 1973.
- Peach Lake- a hamlet and CDP in the northeastern part of town, situated mostly in the town of Southeast, Putnam County.

== Image gallery ==
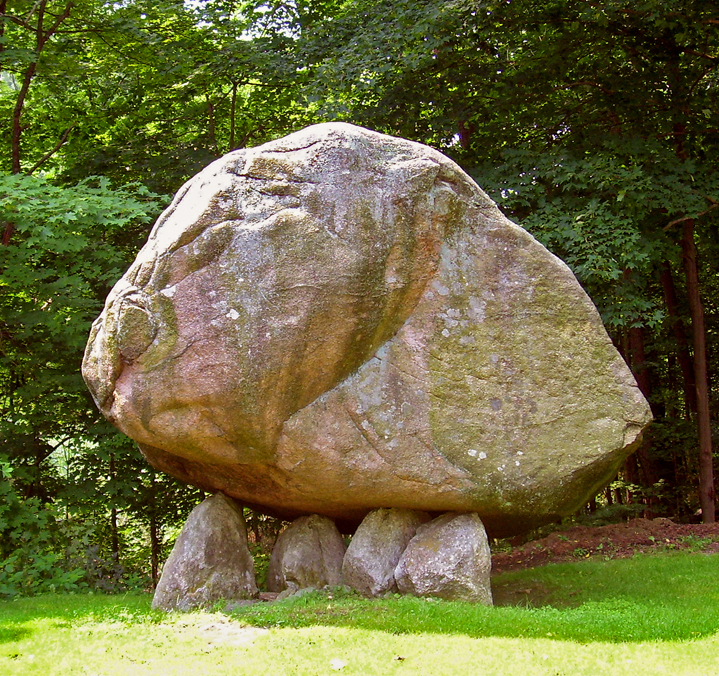
North Salem's Balanced Rock

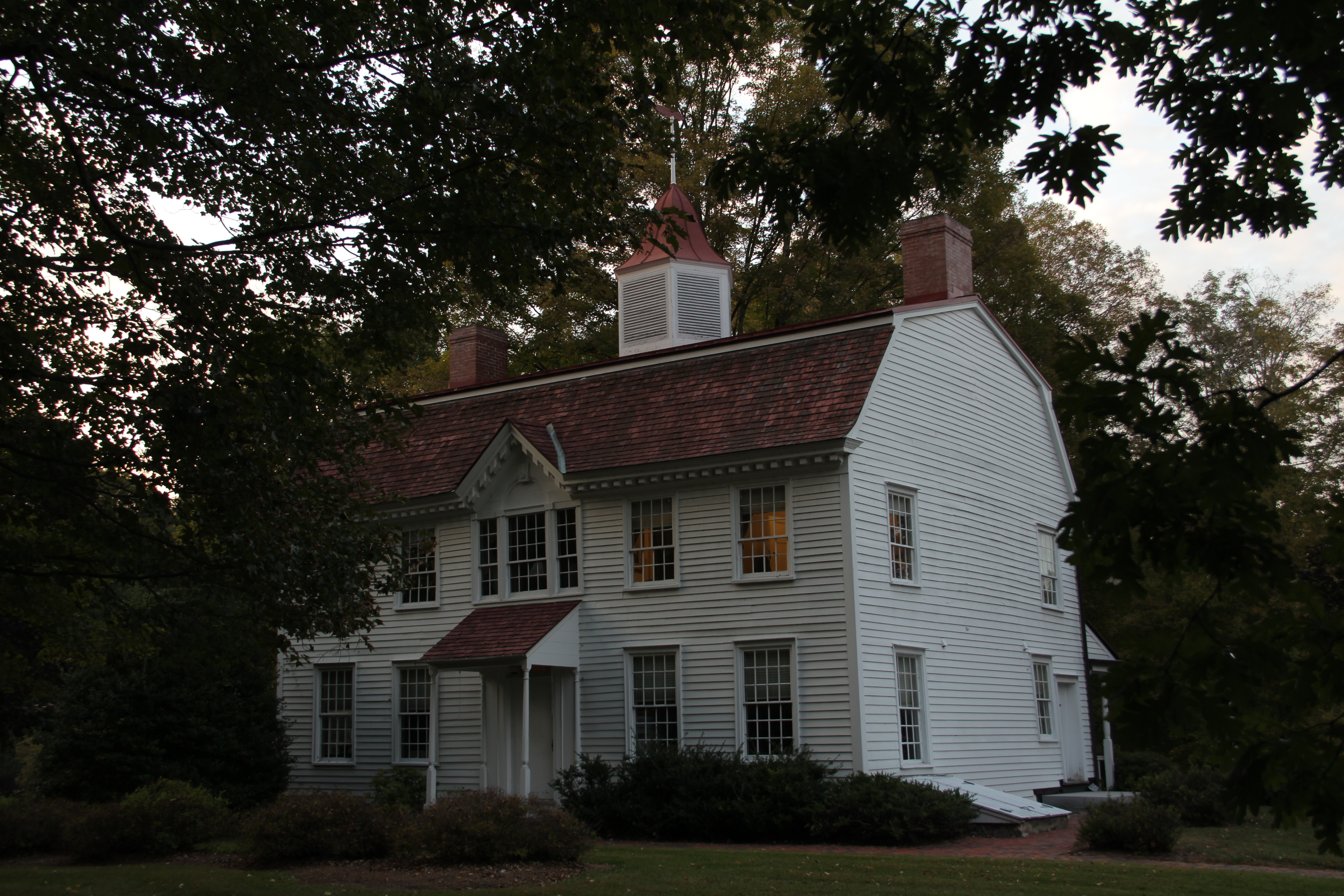
North Salem's Town Hall

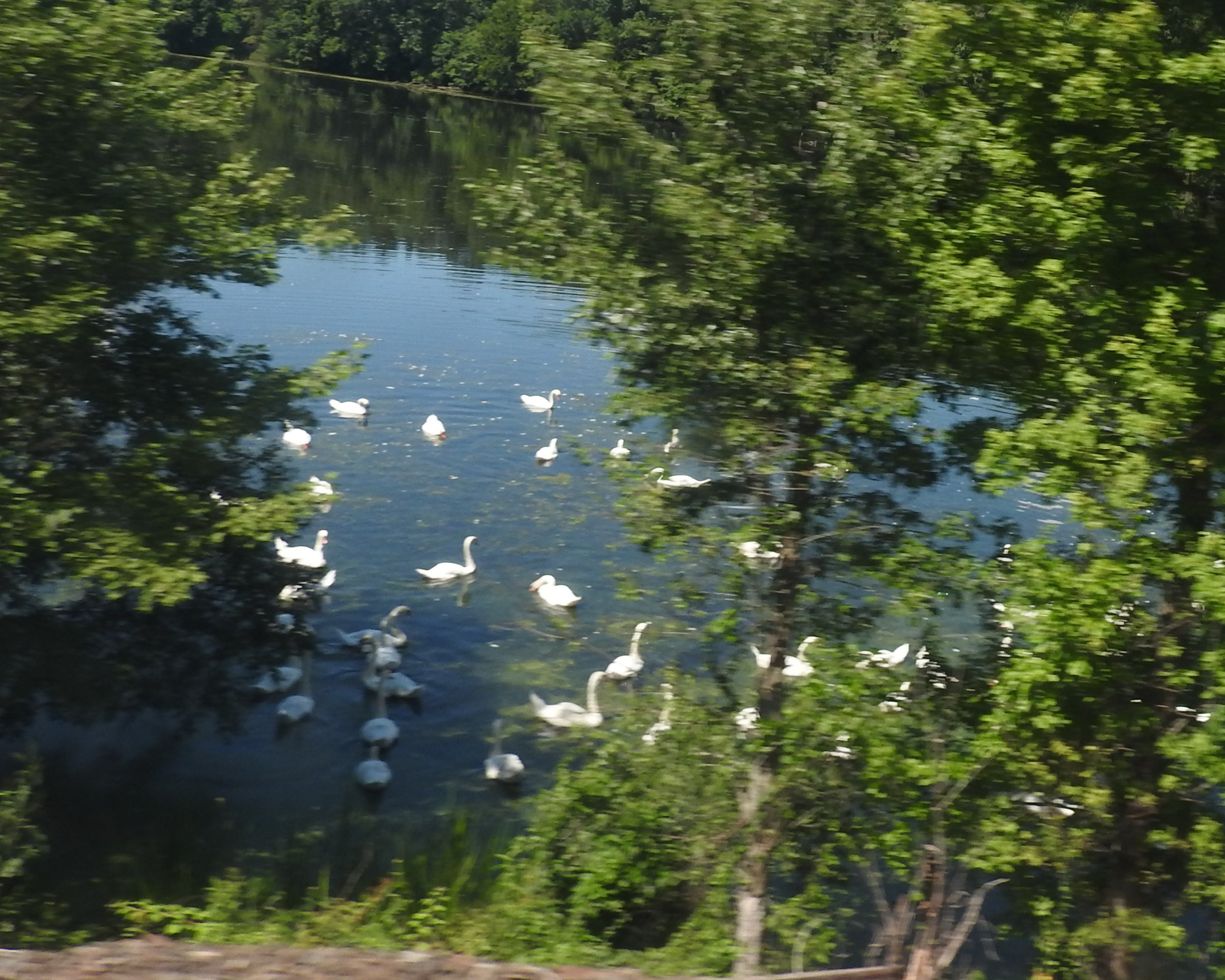
Swans in the Croton River, near the hamlet of Purdys

== Notable people ==
- Jacob M. Appel (born 1973), author of Einstein's Beach House
- Emily Bindiger (born 1955), singer
- Dick Button (1929-2025) figure skater
- Fanny Crosby (1820-1915), writer
- Laurence D. Fink (born 1952), business executive, owns a farm there
- Richard Gere (born 1949), actor
- Chapman Grant (1887-1983), herpetologist and historian, grandson of President Ulysses S. Grant
- Ulysses Simpson Grant IV (1893–1977), geologist and paleontologist, grandson of President Ulysses S. Grant
- Robbie Kondor (1955-2025), musician
- David Letterman (born 1947), talk show host
- David Marks (born 1948), original member of the Beach Boys
- Alan Menken (born 1949), film composer and songwriter
- Paul Newman (1925-2008), actor, director and race car driver
- Rodrigo Pessoa (born 1972), Brazilian show jumper
- Steven Rattner, (born 1952), financier, in charge of 2008 General Motors auto bailout, owns a horse farm in North Salem.
- Sam Savitt (1917-2000), equestrian artist and author

== See also ==
- North Salem Town Hall
- South Salem, New York
- Baxter Preserve
- Hammond Museum and Japanese Stroll Garden
