= Union Hall (Danforth, Maine) =

- U.S. National Register of Historic Places
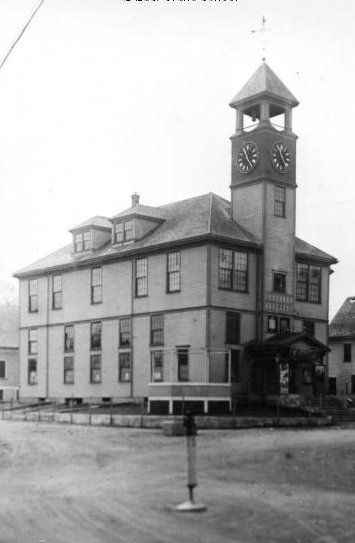
- Photo c. 1920

- Location within Maine Location within the United States
- Location: Depot and Central Sts., Danforth, Maine
- Coordinates: 45°39′29″N 67°52′2″W
- Area: less than one acre
- Built: 1890
- Architect: Edwin E. Lewis
- NRHP reference No.: 87000938
- Added to NRHP: June 25, 1987

Union Hall is a historic meeting hall near the junction of Depot and Central Streets in Danforth, Maine. Built in 1890, the hall has served since then as a venue for private and public events, including town meetings and other municipal functions, and as a meeting point for fraternal organizations including the Masons and the Odd Fellows. It is a prominent landmark in the village center. The building was listed on the National Register of Historic Places in 1987.

== Description and history ==
Danforth's Union Hall is located in the village center, one block south of the junction of United States Route 1 and Maine State Route 169. It is a tall two story wood frame structure, with a hip roof, clapboard siding, and a granite foundation. A three-story tower projects from the front facade, with a clock stage and open belfry capped by a pyramidal roof. A gable-roofed porch extends across the center of the three-bay facade, sheltering the building entrance. The entrances open to a vestibule that has ticket offices and stairs to either side rising to the gallery level of the auditorium, which occupies most of the first floor. The upper level is taken up by the meeting spaces of the fraternal organizations.

The hall was designed by Gardiner-based Edwin E. Lewis, a prolific architect of the late 19th century in central and eastern Maine, and was built in 1890. It was commissioned by the Union Hall Corporation, which operated the hall as a public benefit, hosting town meetings and other social, civic, and theatrical functions. In 1906 the upper level was sold to local chapters of the International Order of Odd Fellows and Masons.

== See also ==
- National Register of Historic Places listings in Washington County, Maine
