= North Salem Town Hall =

- U.S. National Register of Historic Places
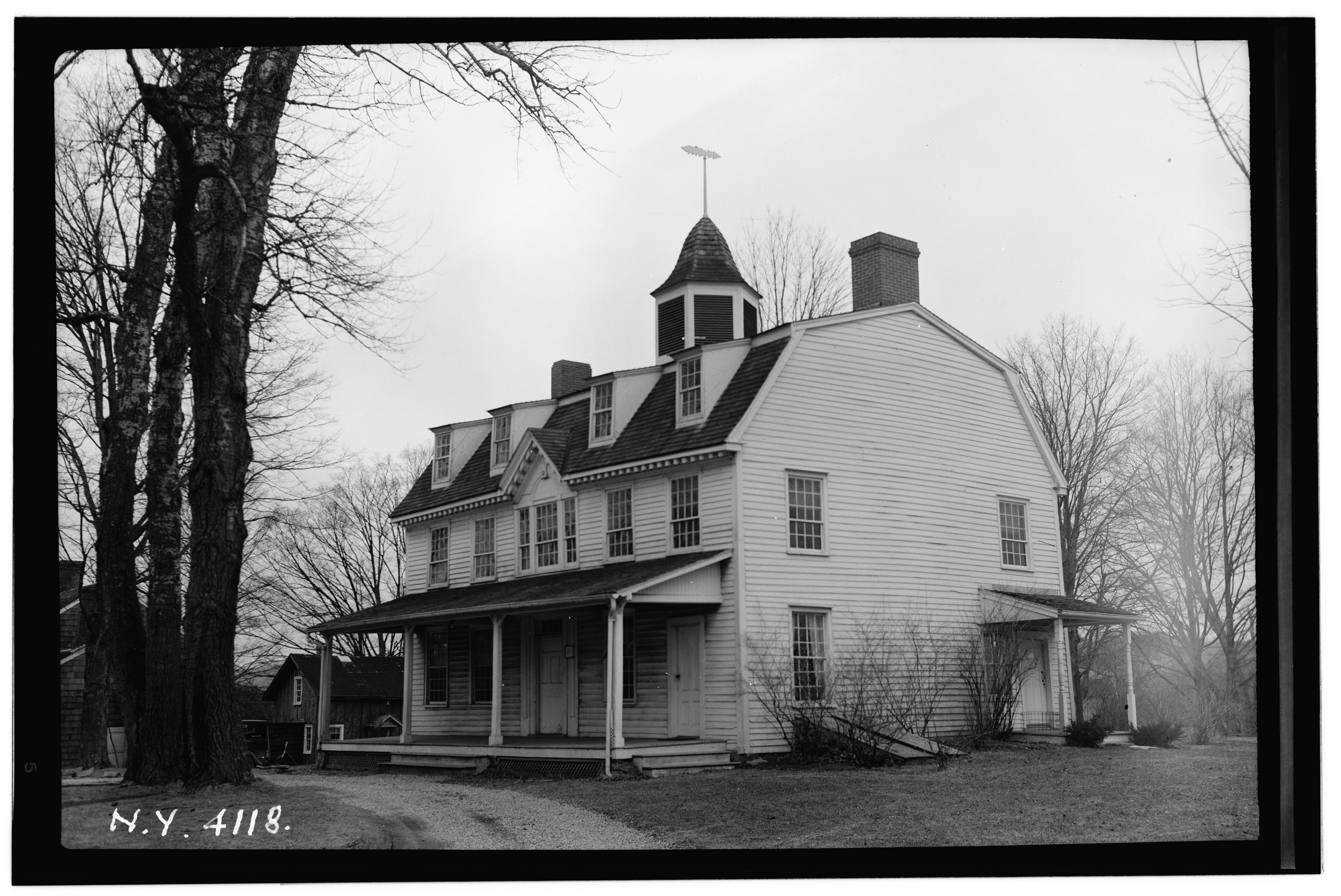
- HABS image of North Salem Town Hall

- Location within New York Location within the United States
- Location: Titicus Rd., Salem Center, New York
- Coordinates: 41°19′44″N 73°35′51″W
- Area: less than one acre
- Built: c. 1770
- Architectural style: Georgian, Georgian vernacular
- NRHP reference No.: 80002794
- Added to NRHP: September 4, 1980

North Salem Town Hall is a historic town hall located in North Salem, Westchester County, New York. It was built about 1770 by New York lawyer Stephen De Lancey, a member of a prominent Loyalist family. The house has been used for governmental and educational functions since 1773.

It is a three-story frame building, covered in clapboard, five bays wide and three bays deep on a fieldstone foundation in a vernacular Georgian style. It has a gambrel roof topped by a six-sided cupola. Although the building underwent various modifications over time—such as the addition of a large porch—its exterior was returned to its initial design following World War II.

Through his grandmother, Anne Van Cortlandt, Stephen De Lancey was a descendant of the owners of Van Cortlandt Manor, once the largest landholding in northern Westchester. Around 1770, he decided to build for himself a manor house in Westchester (in what is now North Salem) that would measure up to that of the Van Cortlandts. He moved into the house in 1773, but had to leave his new residence and move to New York City just months later amid growing political tensions on the eve of the American Revolutionary War. A staunch Loyalist, he eventually emigrated to Canada and never lived in his house again. De Lancey died in Annapolis Royal, Nova Scotia, in 1809.

The building was appropriated by local Patriots in 1776 and initially served as a courthouse and jail. From 1790 to 1884, it housed a private school for boys, the North Salem Academy. The academy survived for almost a century and had several prominent people as its graduates, including DeWitt Clinton and Daniel D. Tompkins.

After 1886, the building housed the town offices of North Salem, New York. It was added to the National Register of Historic Places in 1980 as North Salem Town Hall.

== See also ==
- National Register of Historic Places listings in northern Westchester County, New York
