= Joseph Purdy Homestead =

Historic house in New York, United States

- U.S. National Register of Historic Places
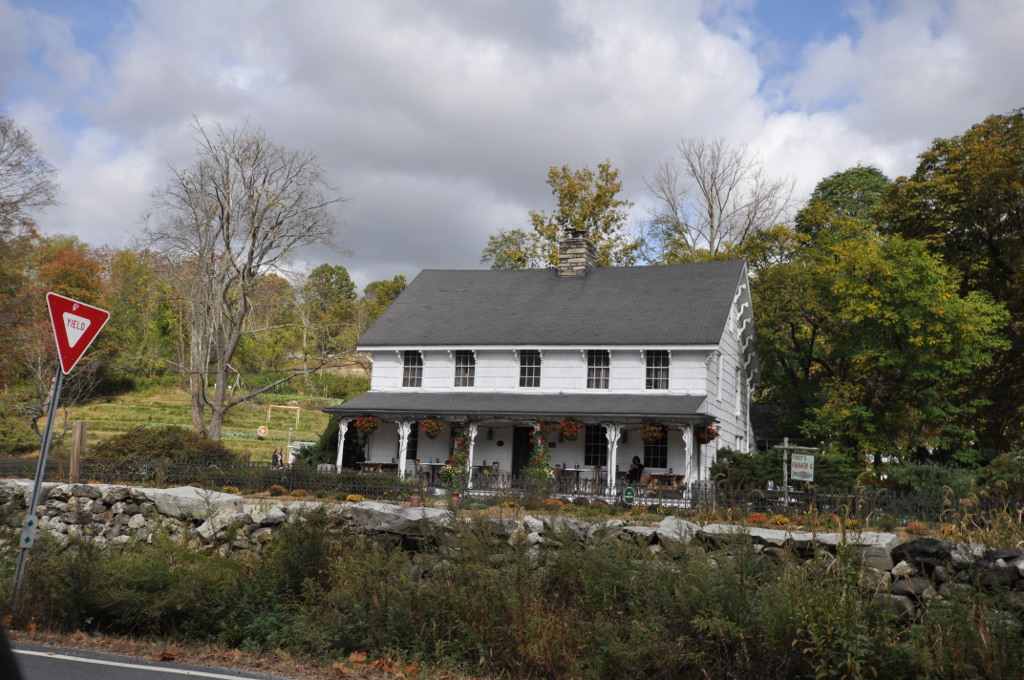

- Location within New York Location within the United States
- Location: Jct. of NY 22 and 116, Purdy's, New York
- Coordinates: 41°19′42″N 73°39′21″W
- Area: 15 acres (6.1 ha)
- Built: 1776
- NRHP reference No.: 73001290
- Added to NRHP: January 25, 1973

Joseph Purdy Homestead is a historic home located in Purdy's, Westchester County, New York. It was built in 1776 and consists of an L-shaped, 2 1/2-story main block attached to which are several one-story wings. The main block measures six bays wide. It features a five-bay, one-story porch along the front elevation added about 1870.

In November 2011, Purdy's announced plans to be turned into a family restaurant, specializing in fish dishes and home-grown vegetables. The restaurant, known as "Purdys Farmer & The Fish," opened in Spring 2012.

It was added to the National Register of Historic Places in 1973.

== See also ==
- National Register of Historic Places listings in northern Westchester County, New York
