= Skowhegan Free Public Library =

United States national historic place

- U.S. National Register of Historic Places
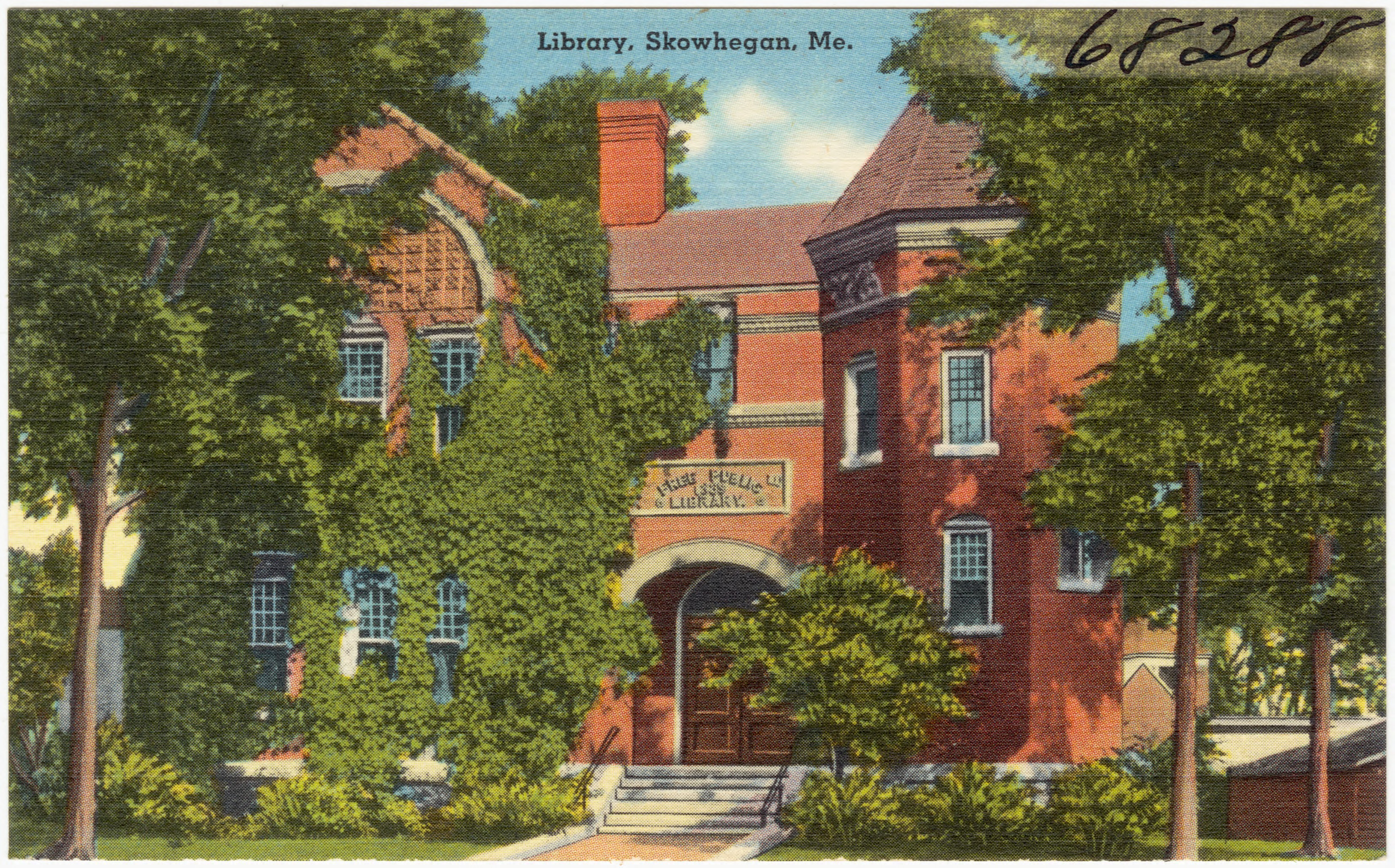
- Postcard c. 1930s

- Location within Maine Location within the United States
- Location: 9 Elm St., Skowhegan, Maine
- Coordinates: 44°45′58″N 69°43′15″W
- Area: 0.5 acres (0.20 ha)
- Built: 1889
- Architect: Edwin E. Lewis
- Architectural style: Queen Anne
- NRHP reference No.: 83000473
- Added to NRHP: April 14, 1983

The Skowhegan Free Public Library is the public library of Skowhegan, Maine. It is located at 9 Elm Street, in an architecturally significant Queen Anne brick building designed by Edwin E. Lewis and completed in 1890. The building was listed on the National Register of Historic Places in 1983. The library is managed by the Bloomfield Academy Trustees.

== Architecture and history ==
The library is located on the north side of Elm Street, just west of its junction with Madison Avenue (United States Route 201), and overlooking the Kennebec River. The building is a 2-1/2 story brick structure, with asymmetrical massing characteristic of the Queen Anne period. Its main block has a hip roof, with a projecting gable section at the left side of the front (south-facing) facade, and an octagonal tower projecting forward from the right side of the facade, with then entrance between these two elements. An ell extends to the rear of the main block. The gable section has bands of three sash windows on both levels, with a large semicircular terra cotta panel above. The first-floor windows are in segmented-arch openings. The entrance is set in a terra-cotta arch, which was originally open but has since been closed in. The tower at the right has an entablature with terra cotta decoration below its octagonal pyramidal roof.

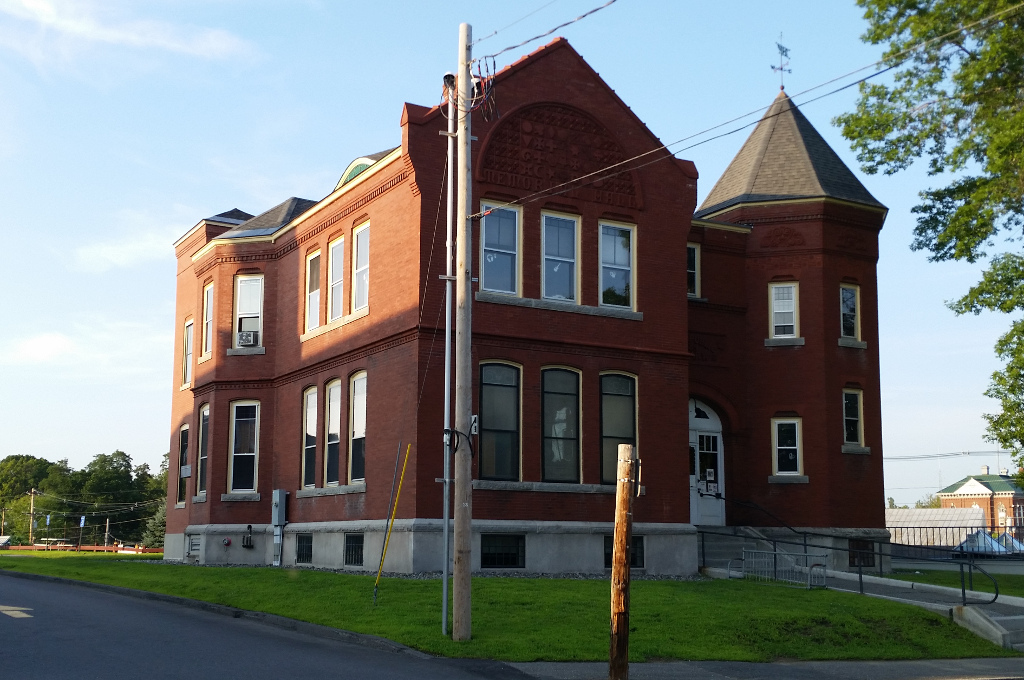
The library in 2018

The building's interior is of extremely high quality and preservation. It has ornate millwork, moldings, and stained glass, and includes furniture built to match the building's features. Wooden shelving is built into place between the floor and ceiling.

The library was built in part due to the efforts and donations of native son Abner Coburn, who gave land and funding for its construction. The building was designed by Gardiner architect Edwin E. Lewis, and is one of Somerset County's finest non-residential Queen Anne buildings.

== See also ==
- National Register of Historic Places listings in Somerset County, Maine
