= North Dakota Highway 294 =

Highway in North Dakota

North Dakota Highway 294
- 12th Avenue North

Route information
- Maintained by NDDOT
- Length: 2.158 mi (3.473 km)

Major junctions
- West end: I-29 / US 81 in Fargo
- East end: US 81 Bus. in Fargo

Location
- Country: United States
- State: North Dakota
- Counties: Cass

Highway system
- North Dakota State Highway System; Interstate; US; State
← US 281	→ ND 297

North Dakota Highway 294 (ND 294) is a 2.158-mile-long (3.473 km) east–west state highway in the U.S. state of North Dakota. It is unsigned throughout its entire duration. ND 294's western terminus is at Interstate 29 (I-29) in Fargo, and the eastern terminus is at U.S. Route 81 Business (US 81 Bus.) in Fargo.

In 2005, the highway received earmarked federal funds for a reconstruction and bridge widening project.

== Major intersections ==
The entire route is in Fargo, Cass County.

mi	km	Destinations	Notes
0.000	0.000	I-29 / US 81 – Grand Forks, Sioux Falls	Western terminus, I-29 Exit 66
1.953	3.143	US 81 Bus. south (University Drive North)	Alternate route to Hector International Airport
2.158	3.473	US 81 Bus. north (10th Street North)	Eastern terminus
1.000 mi = 1.609 km; 1.000 km = 0.621 mi

== Gallery ==
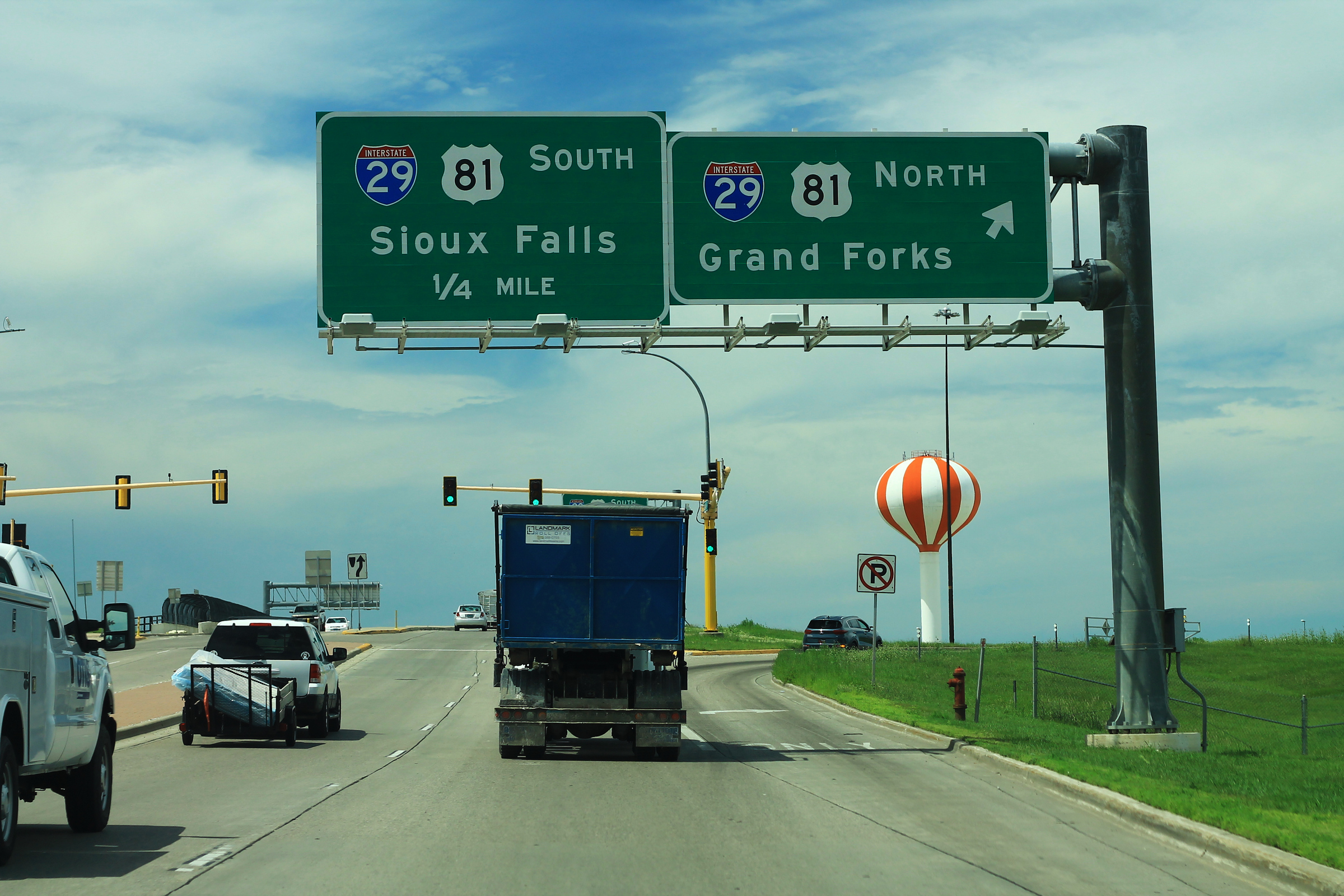
ND 294 at its western terminus
