= North Dakota Highway 297 =

State highway in North Dakota, U.S.

North Dakota Highway 297
- DeMers Avenue

Route information
- Maintained by NDDOT
- Length: 3.060 mi (4.925 km)

Major junctions
- West end: I-29 / US 81 in Grand Forks
- US 81 Bus. in Grand Forks
- East end: US 2 Bus. in Grand Forks

Location
- Country: United States
- State: North Dakota
- Counties: Grand Forks

Highway system
- North Dakota State Highway System; Interstate; US; State
← ND 294	→ ND 810

North Dakota Highway 297 (ND 297) is a 3.060-mile-long (4.925 km) east-west state highway in the U.S. state of North Dakota. ND 297's western terminus is at Interstate 29 (I-29) in Grand Forks, and the eastern terminus is at U.S. Route 2 Business (US 2 Bus.) in Grand Forks.

== Major intersections ==
The entire route is in Grand Forks, Grand Forks County.

mi	km	Destinations	Notes
0.000	0.000	I-29 / US 81 – Fargo, Winnipeg	Western terminus; exit 140 (I-29)
2.270	3.653	US 81 Bus.	
3.060	4.925	US 2 Bus.	Eastern terminus
1.000 mi = 1.609 km; 1.000 km = 0.621 mi
