= Union Hall (North Salem, New York) =

Historic commercial building in New York, United States

- U.S. National Register of Historic Places
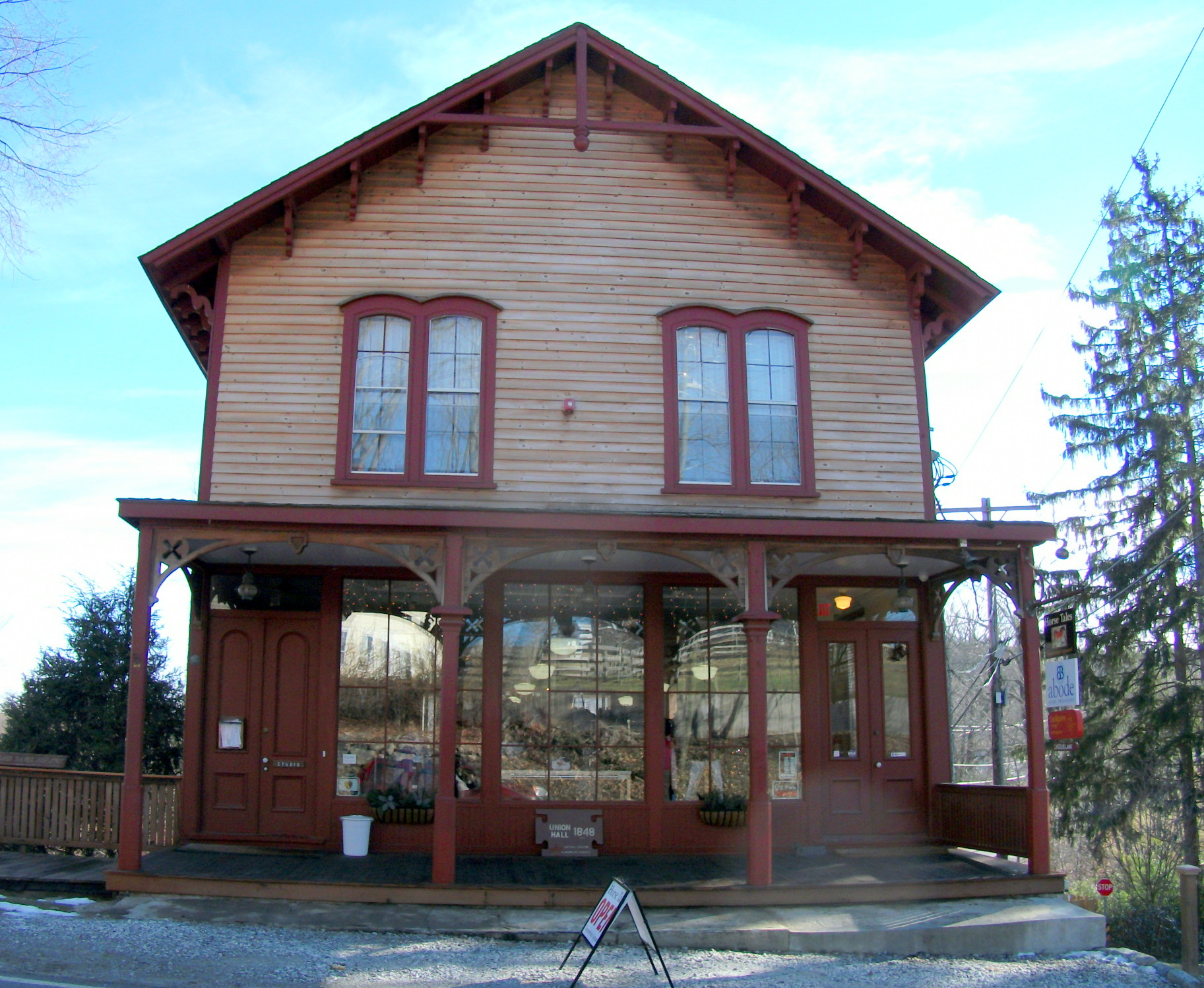
- Union Hall, December 2010

- Location within New York Location within the United States
- Location: NY 116 and Keeler Ln., North Salem, New York
- Coordinates: 41°20′7″N 73°34′15″W
- Area: 1.4 acres (0.57 ha)
- Built: 1848
- Architectural style: Italianate
- NRHP reference No.: 86001978
- Added to NRHP: August 28, 1986

Union Hall is a historic commercial building located at North Salem, Westchester County, New York. It is impossible to trace its original owner and the date it was built is unknown due to omissions in the Land Records Office in White Plains. It was built around 1848 in the Italianate style. It is built into the side of a steep slope and has a two-story front facade and four stories at the rear. It is a rectangular, wood-frame building sheathed in unpainted clapboard. The building once functioned as a store, meeting hall, stagecoach stop, and residence. Also on the property there was a contributing carriage barn. However The Carriage Barn roof caved in due to heavy snows in January 1996 and was demolished in 2001. It is currently owned by Janis Menken.

It was added to the National Register of Historic Places in 1986.

== See also ==
- National Register of Historic Places listings in northern Westchester County, New York
