= Truro Town Hall =

- Union Hall
- U.S. National Register of Historic Places
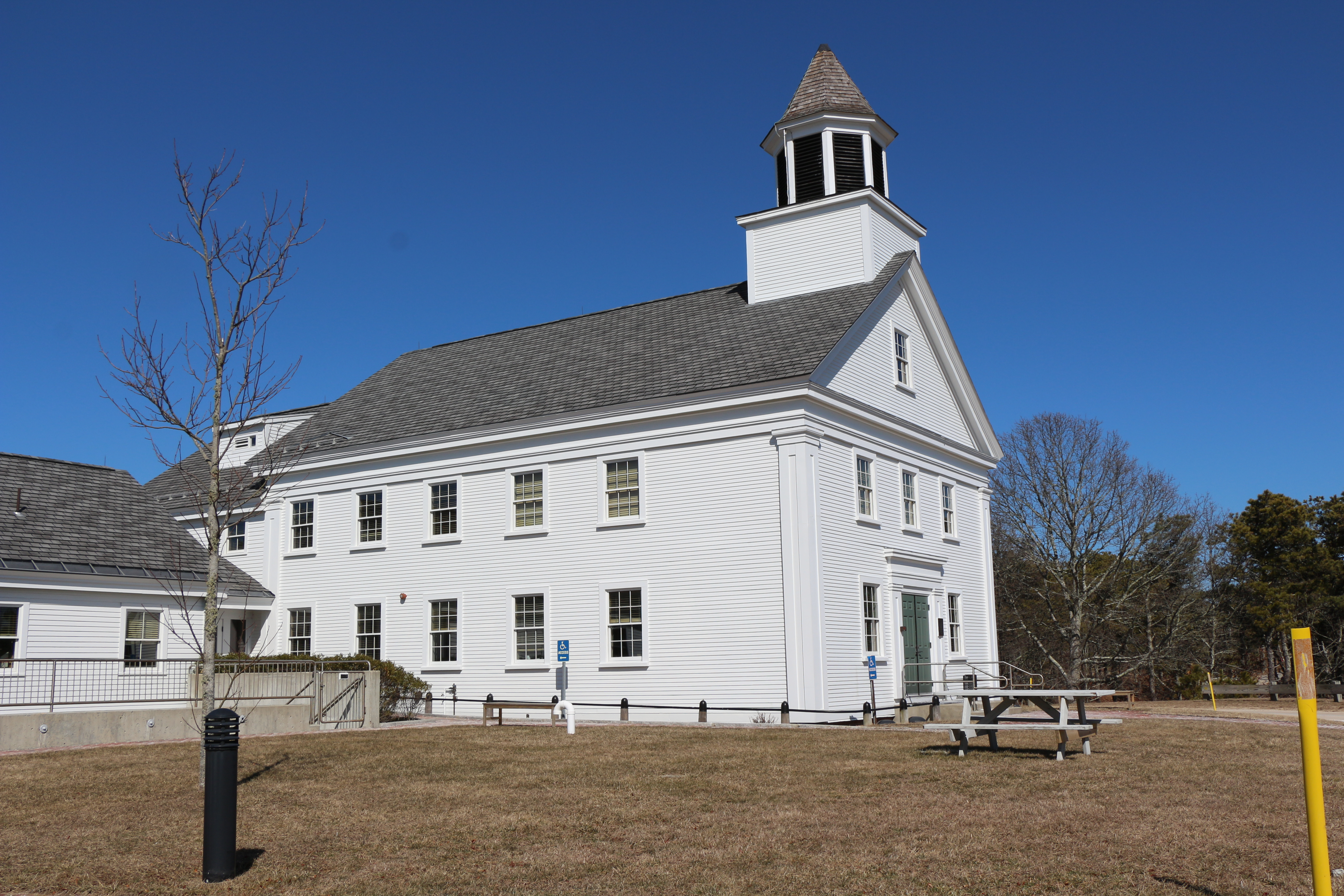

- Location within Cape Cod Location within Massachusetts Location within the United States
- Location: Truro, Massachusetts
- Coordinates: 41°59′54″N 70°3′15″W
- Built: 1848
- Architectural style: Greek Revival
- NRHP reference No.: 97000470
- Added to NRHP: May 23, 1997

Truro Town Hall, formerly Union Hall, is the town hall of Truro, Massachusetts. It is located on Town Hall Road, east of Massachusetts Route 6. The two story wood-frame building was built in 1848 to serve as a meeting place for several fraternal organizations, including the International Order of Odd Fellows and the Sons of Temperance. It served these organizations for only a few years, and was rented by the town for town meetings for a time before being purchased by the town. The building exhibits Greek Revival features, including corner pilasters and a deep architrave. The roof is topped by an octagonal cupola mounted on a square structure.

The building was listed on the National Register of Historic Places in 1997 as "Union Hall".

== See also ==
- National Register of Historic Places listings in Barnstable County, Massachusetts
