= Labor Temple Building =

Historic building in San Diego, California, U.S.

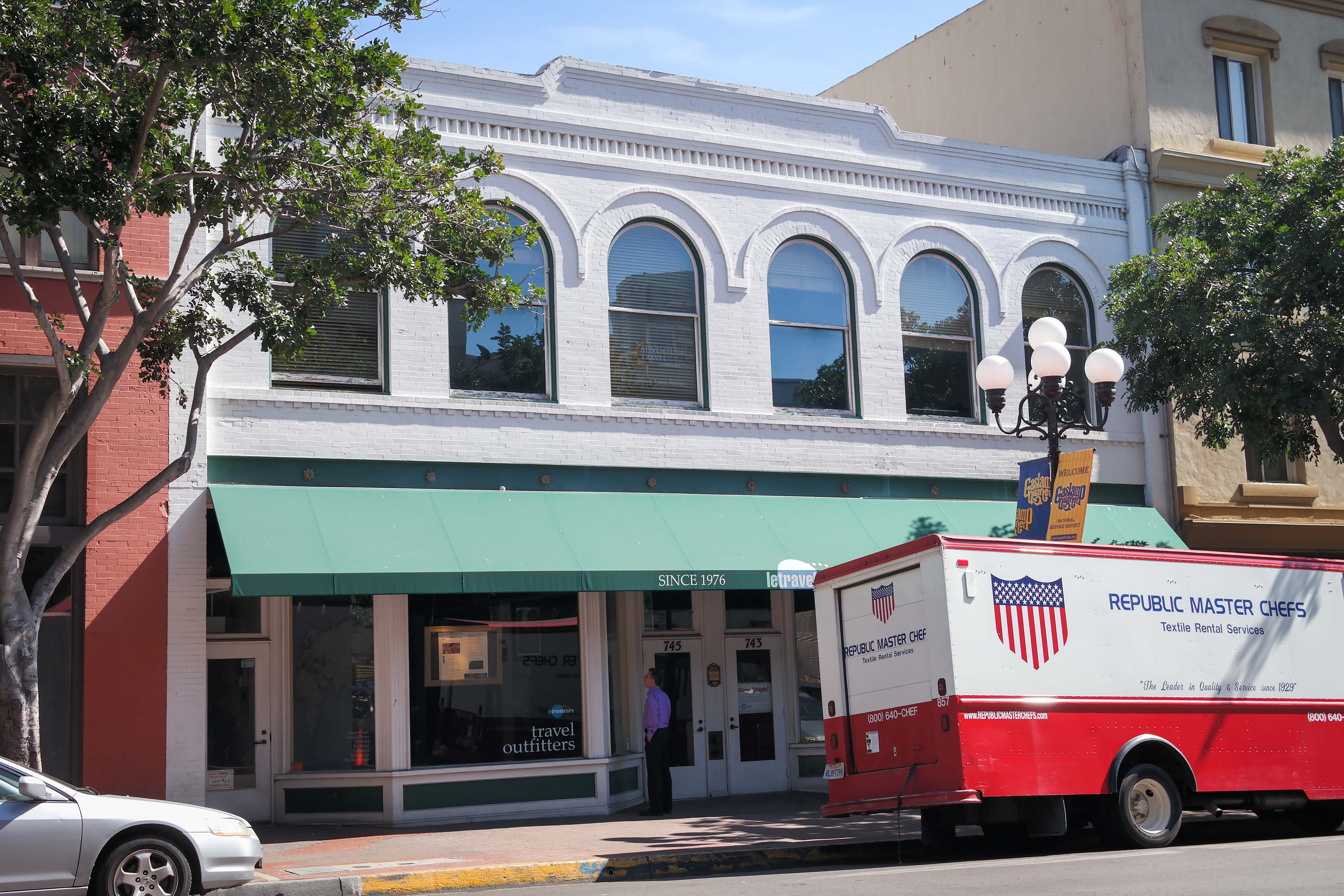
- The building's exterior in 2014
- Interactive map of the Labor Temple Building area

General information
- Location: 743 4th Avenue, San Diego, United States
- Coordinates: 32°42′47″N 117°09′39″W
- Opened: 1907

The Labor Temple Building is a historic structure located at 743 4th Avenue in San Diego's Gaslamp Quarter, in the U.S. state of California. It was built in 1907. Currently, the building's tenant is a Cuban cigar shop and hookah lounge.

== See also ==
- List of Gaslamp Quarter historic buildings
