= Titicus Reservoir =

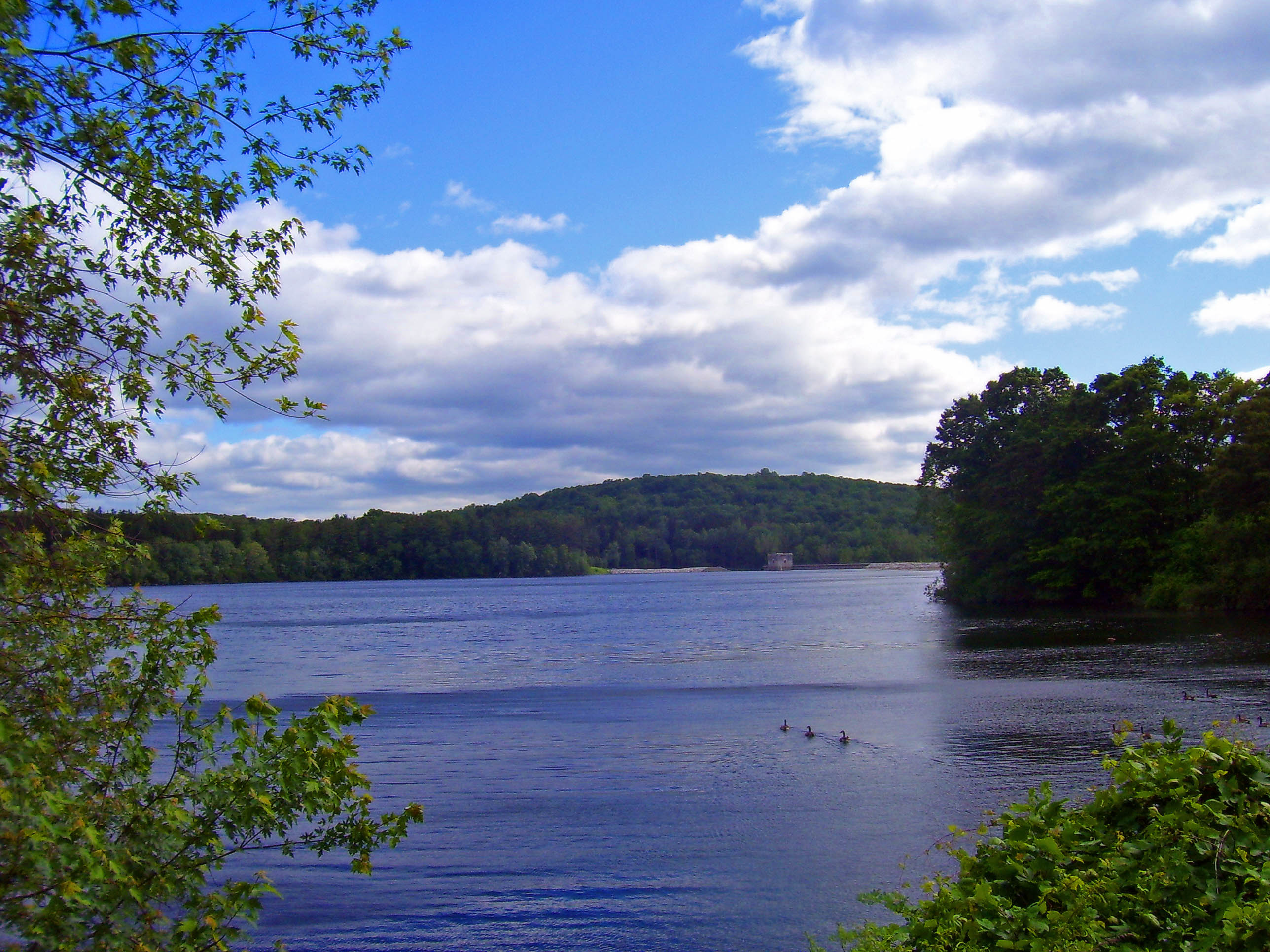

- Location within New York
- Location: Westchester County, New York
- Coordinates: 41°19′58.44″N 73°37′29.28″W
- Type: reservoir
- Catchment area: 24 sq mi (62 km^{2})
- Basin countries: United States
- Built: 1893
- Surface area: 681.5 acres (275.8 ha)
- Average depth: 32 ft (9.8 m)
- Water volume: 7.2 billion U.S. gallons (27 million cubic meters)

Titicus Reservoir is a reservoir located in the Town of North Salem in Westchester County, 30 miles (48 km) north of New York City. One of twelve in the NYC water supply's Croton Watershed, it has been supplying the system since 1893.

At full capacity it holds 7.2 billion gallons (2.7 million m^{3}). It is 681.5 acres (2.7 km^{2}) in area, two miles (3.2 km) long, reaches a mean depth of 32 feet (9.8 m) and drains a 24-square mile (62.4 km^{2}) area in North Salem and Lewisboro. The Titicus River, which feeds the east end of the reservoir, begins more than five miles away in Ridgefield, Connecticut; it drains much of northern Ridgefield and Ridgebury, Connecticut.

Water from the reservoir goes first along the Titicus to the Muscoot Reservoir, then into New Croton Reservoir and finally along the 24-mile (38.6-km) New Croton Aqueduct to the Jerome Park Reservoir in the Bronx, where it becomes part of the city's daily draw.

In 2015, a small Cessna aircraft crashed into the Titicus Reservoir, killing both passengers.

== See also ==
- List of reservoirs and dams in New York
