= Wytopitlock, Maine =

- Village
- Location within Maine
- Coordinates: 45°38′26″N 68°04′32″W
- Country: United States
- State: Maine
- County: Aroostook
- Township: Reed Plantation
- Elevation: 341 ft (104 m)
- Time zone: UTC-5 (Eastern (EST))
  - Summer (DST): UTC-4 (EDT)
- ZIP code: 04497
- Area code: 207
- GNIS feature ID: 578733

Wytopitlock is an unincorporated village in Reed Plantation, Aroostook County, Maine, United States. Wytopitlock is located on the Mattawamkeag River and is served by Maine State Route 171.
