= Reed Plantation, Maine =

- Plantation
- Location of Reed Plantation, Maine
- Coordinates: 45°43′25″N 68°08′32″W
- Country: United States
- State: Maine
- County: Aroostook

Area
  - Total: 59.2 sq mi (153.3 km^{2})
  - Land: 59.0 sq mi (152.7 km^{2})
  - Water: 0.23 sq mi (0.6 km^{2})
- Elevation: 492 ft (150 m)

Population (2020)
  - Total: 129
  - Density: 2.19/sq mi (0.845/km^{2})
- Time zone: UTC-5 (Eastern (EST))
  - Summer (DST): UTC-4 (EDT)
- ZIP code: 04497
- Area code: 207
- FIPS code: 23-62400
- GNIS feature ID: 582694

Reed Plantation is a plantation in Aroostook County, Maine, United States. The population was 129 at the 2020 census.

== Geography ==
According to the United States Census Bureau, the plantation has a total area of 59.2 square miles (153.3 km^{2}), of which 59.0 square miles (152.7 km^{2}) is land and 0.23 square miles (0.6 km^{2}), or 0.38%, is water.

== Demographics ==
Historical population
Census	Pop.	Note	%±
1860	72		—
1870	54		−25.0%
1880	109		101.9%
1890	203		86.2%
1900	399		96.6%
1910	537		34.6%
1920	639		19.0%
1930	495		−22.5%
1940	433		−12.5%
1950	351		−18.9%
1960	325		−7.4%
1970	273		−16.0%
1980	274		0.4%
1990	296		8.0%
2000	207		−30.1%
2010	161		−22.2%
2020	129		−19.9%
U.S. Decennial Census

At the 2000 census there were 207 people, 74 households, and 58 families living in the plantation. The population density was 3.5 inhabitants per square mile (1.4/km^{2}). There were 108 housing units at an average density of 1.8 per square mile (0.69/km^{2}). The racial makeup of the plantation was 96.14% White, 1.93% Asian, and 1.93% from two or more races. Of the 74 households 29.7% had children under the age of 18 living with them, 63.5% were married couples living together, 10.8% had a female householder with no husband present, and 20.3% were non-families. 16.2% of households were one person and 6.8% were one person aged 65 or older. The average household size was 2.80 and the average family size was 3.03.

The age distribution was 25.6% under the age of 18, 3.4% from 18 to 24, 26.6% from 25 to 44, 29.5% from 45 to 64, and 15.0% 65 or older. The median age was 41 years. For every 100 females, there were 91.7 males. For every 100 females age 18 and over, there were 92.5 males.

The median household income was $21,979 and the median family income was $24,375. Males had a median income of $38,500 versus $15,313 for females. The per capita income for the plantation was $10,155. About 16.4% of families and 16.9% of the population were below the poverty line, including 14.7% of those under the age of 18 and 11.1% of those 65 or over.

== History ==
Reed Plantation was first settled in the early 1830s by four families, Clifford, Rollins, Prouty, and Plummer. The matriarchs of these families were four Spaulding sisters, Edith Clifford, Susan Spaulding, Lavinia Prouty, and Phoebe Plummer. They were the daughters of Seth Spaulding of the Dover-Foxcroft area. Many of their descendants still live in Reed or the village of Wytopitlock today.
