= Houlton (CDP), Maine =

Houlton, Maine
- Census-designated place
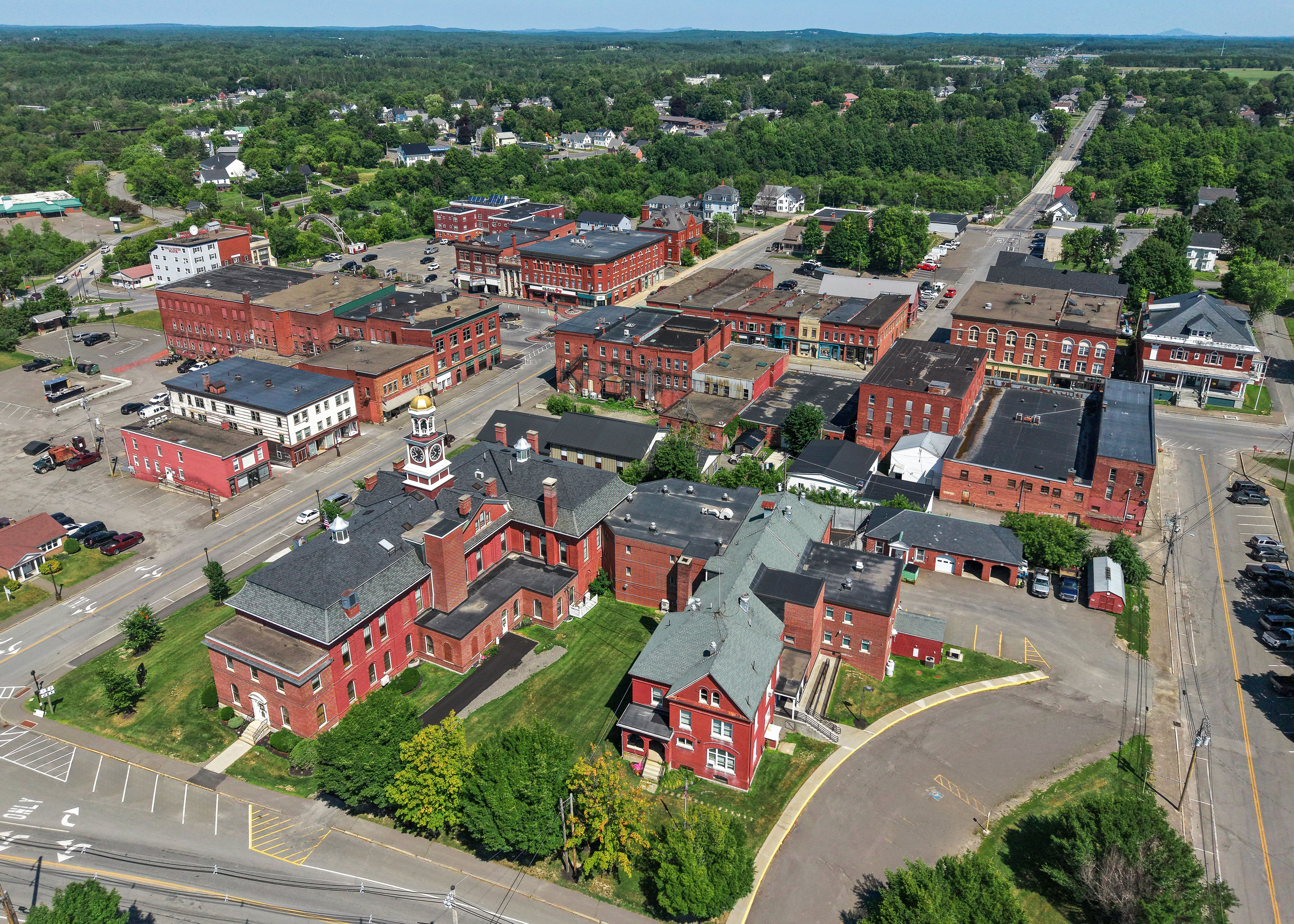
- Downtown Houlton

- Location of Houlton, Maine
- Coordinates: 46°07′38″N 67°49′47″W
- Country: United States
- State: Maine
- County: Aroostook
- Town: Houlton

Area
  - Total: 5.25 sq mi (13.61 km^{2})
  - Land: 5.25 sq mi (13.61 km^{2})
  - Water: 0 sq mi (0.00 km^{2})
- Elevation: 413 ft (126 m)

Population (2020)
  - Total: 4,743
  - Density: 902.4/sq mi (348.42/km^{2})
- Time zone: UTC-5 (Eastern (EST))
  - Summer (DST): UTC-4 (EDT)
- ZIP Code: 04730
- Area code: 207
- FIPS code: 23-33945
- GNIS feature ID: 2377918

Houlton is a census-designated place (CDP) comprising the main village within the town of Houlton in Aroostook County, Maine, United States. The population of the CDP was 4,856 at the 2010 census, out of a population of 6,123 for the entire town. Houlton is the county seat of Aroostook County. The northern terminus of Interstate 95 and eastern terminus of U.S. Route 2 are just east of the CDP at the Canada–United States border.

== Geography ==
The Houlton CDP is located near the center of the town of Houlton, along the Meduxnekeag River. U.S. Route 1 and U.S. Route 2 intersect at the center of the CDP, and Interstate 95 passes along the northern edge, with access at Exit 302 (Route 1). It is 42 miles (68 km) north along Route 1 to Presque Isle, 120 miles (190 km) southwest along I-95 to Bangor, 90 miles (140 km) southeast along Route 1 to Calais and 16 miles (26 km) east along I-95 and New Brunswick Route 95 to Woodstock, New Brunswick.

According to the United States Census Bureau, the CDP has a total area of 5.3 square miles (13.6 km^{2}), all land.

== Demographics ==
Historical population
Census	Pop.	Note	%±
2020	4,743		—
U.S. Decennial Census

As of the census of 2000, there were 5,270 people, 2,203 households, and 1,310 families residing in the CDP. The population density was 687.3 inhabitants per square mile (265.4/km^{2}). There were 2,472 housing units at an average density of 124.4 persons/km^{2} (322.4 persons/sq mi). The racial makeup of the CDP was 95.48% White, 0.34% African American, 2.81% Native American, 0.53% Asian, 0.09% Pacific Islander, 0.11% from other races, and 0.63% from two or more races. Hispanic or Latino of any race were 0.49% of the population.

There were 2,203 households, out of which 28.3% had children under the age of 18 living with them, 45.0% were married couples living together, 11.3% had a female householder with no husband present, and 40.5% were non-families. 36.6% of all households were made up of individuals, and 19.2% had someone living alone who was 65 years of age or older. The average household size was 2.24 and the average family size was 2.92.

In the CDP, the population was spread out, with 23.1% under the age of 18, 7.4% from 18 to 24, 25.1% from 25 to 44, 21.8% from 45 to 64, and 22.6% who were 65 years of age or older. The median age was 41 years. For every 100 females, there were 87.0 males. For every 100 females age 18 and over, there were 81.1 males.

The median income for a household in the CDP was $25,162, and the median income for a family was $33,864. Males had a median income of $27,534 versus $21,778 for females. The per capita income for the CDP was $13,875. About 1.31% of families and 17.6% of the population were below the poverty line, including 20.3% of those under the age of 18 and 16.0% ages 65 or older.
