= Springfield, Maine =

Town in Maine, United States

- Town
- Location within Maine Location within the United States
- Coordinates: 45°23′04″N 68°08′25″W
- Country: United States
- State: Maine
- County: Penobscot

Area
  - Total: 38.53 sq mi (99.79 km^{2})
  - Land: 38.48 sq mi (99.66 km^{2})
  - Water: 0.050 sq mi (0.13 km^{2})
- Elevation: 394 ft (120 m)

Population (2020)
  - Total: 293
  - Density: 7.5/sq mi (2.9/km^{2})
- Time zone: UTC−5 (Eastern (EST))
  - Summer (DST): UTC−4 (EDT)
- ZIP Code: 04487
- Area code: 207
- FIPS code: 23-73250
- GNIS feature ID: 582741
- Website: springfieldmaine.weebly.com

Springfield is a town in Penobscot County, Maine, United States. The population was 293 at the 2020 census.

== History ==
The Gothic Revival-style Springfield Congregational Church (1852) is listed on the National Register of Historic Places.

== Geography ==
According to the United States Census Bureau, the town has a total area of 38.53 square miles (99.79 km^{2}), of which 38.48 square miles (99.66 km^{2}) is land and 0.05 square miles (0.13 km^{2}) is water.

=== Climate ===
This climatic region is typified by large seasonal temperature differences, with warm to hot (and often humid) summers and cold (sometimes severely cold) winters. According to the Köppen Climate Classification system, Springfield has a humid continental climate, abbreviated "Dfb" on climate maps.

== Demographics ==
Historical population
| Census | Pop. | Note | %± |
|---|---|---|---|
| 1840 | 546 | | — |
| 1850 | 583 | | 6.8% |
| 1860 | 854 | | 46.5% |
| 1870 | 879 | | 2.9% |
| 1880 | 878 | | −0.1% |
| 1890 | 677 | | −22.9% |
| 1900 | 532 | | −21.4% |
| 1910 | 459 | | −13.7% |
| 1920 | 497 | | 8.3% |
| 1930 | 451 | | −9.3% |
| 1940 | 442 | | −2.0% |
| 1950 | 414 | | −6.3% |
| 1960 | 426 | | 2.9% |
| 1970 | 336 | | −21.1% |
| 1980 | 443 | | 31.8% |
| 1990 | 406 | | −8.4% |
| 2000 | 379 | | −6.7% |
| 2010 | 409 | | 7.9% |
| 2020 | 293 | | −28.4% |
U.S. Decennial Census

=== 2010 census ===
As of the census of 2010, there were 409 people, 171 households, and 109 families living in the town. The population density was 10.6 inhabitants per square mile (4.1/km^{2}). There were 281 housing units at an average density of 7.3 per square mile (2.8/km^{2}). The racial makeup of the town was 96.6% White, 0.7% Native American, and 2.7% from two or more races. Hispanic or Latino of any race were 1.0% of the population.

There were 171 households, of which 24.6% had children under the age of 18 living with them, 53.2% were married couples living together, 6.4% had a female householder with no husband present, 4.1% had a male householder with no wife present, and 36.3% were non-families. 29.2% of all households were made up of individuals, and 12.9% had someone living alone who was 65 years of age or older. The average household size was 2.39 and the average family size was 2.91.

The median age in the town was 47.7 years. 20.3% of residents were under the age of 18; 6.8% were between the ages of 18 and 24; 18.3% were from 25 to 44; 32.5% were from 45 to 64; and 22% were 65 years of age or older. The gender makeup of the town was 53.1% male and 46.9% female.

=== 2000 census ===
As of the census of 2000, there were 379 people, 150 households, and 109 families living in the town. The population density was 9.9 people per square mile (3.8/km^{2}). There were 196 housing units at an average density of 5.1 per square mile (2.0/km^{2}). The racial makeup of the town was 96.57% White, 0.79% African American, 0.26% Asian, 1.06% from other races, and 1.32% from two or more races.

There were 150 households, out of which 30.7% had children under the age of 18 living with them, 58.0% were married couples living together, 8.0% had a female householder with no husband present, and 27.3% were non-families. 23.3% of all households were made up of individuals, and 12.0% had someone living alone who was 65 years of age or older. The average household size was 2.53 and the average family size was 2.93.

In the town, the population was spread out, with 24.5% under the age of 18, 5.5% from 18 to 24, 27.7% from 25 to 44, 26.6% from 45 to 64, and 15.6% who were 65 years of age or older. The median age was 40 years. For every 100 females, there were 115.3 males. For every 100 females age 18 and over, there were 113.4 males.

The median income for a household in the town was $26,875, and the median income for a family was $28,125. Males had a median income of $29,063 versus $27,500 for females. The per capita income for the town was $12,082. About 14.3% of families and 16.9% of the population were below the poverty line, including 13.8% of those under age 18 and 6.9% of those age 65 or over.

== Education ==
The community is in Maine School Administrative District 30. It operates Lee/Winn Elementary School in Winn and Mount Jefferson Junior High School in Lee. MASD 30 does not operate a high school, but instead pays Lee Academy in Lee to educate its students at the high school level.
