= Danforth, Maine =

Town in Maine, United States

- Town
- Seal

- Location within Maine Location within the United States
- Coordinates: 45°36′52″N 67°49′07″W
- Country: United States
- State: Maine
- County: Washington
- Communities: Danforth; Eaton

Area
  - Total: 60.46 sq mi (156.59 km^{2})
  - Land: 54.00 sq mi (139.86 km^{2})
  - Water: 6.46 sq mi (16.73 km^{2})
- Elevation: 452 ft (138 m)

Population (2020)
  - Total: 587
  - Density: 11/sq mi (4.2/km^{2})
- Time zone: UTC-5 (Eastern (EST))
  - Summer (DST): UTC-4 (EDT)
- ZIP code: 04424
- Area code: 207
- FIPS code: 23-16410
- GNIS feature ID: 582433
- Website: townofdanforthmaine.com

Danforth is a town in Washington County, Maine, United States. The town was named for proprietor Thomas Danforth. The population was 587 at the 2020 census. The town contains the villages of Danforth and Eaton. East Grand School is located in Danforth.

== Geography ==
According to the United States Census Bureau, the town has a total area of 60.46 sq mi (156.59 km^{2}), of which 54 sq mi (139.86 km^{2}) is land and 6.46 sq mi (16.73 km^{2}) is water.

=== Climate ===
This climatic region is typified by large seasonal temperature differences, with warm to hot (and often humid) summers and cold (sometimes severely cold) winters. According to the Köppen Climate Classification system, Danforth has a humid continental climate, abbreviated "Dfb" on climate maps.

Climate data for Danforth, Maine (1991–2020 normals, extremes 1978–2017)
Month	Jan	Feb	Mar	Apr	May	Jun	Jul	Aug	Sep	Oct	Nov	Dec	Year
Record high °F (°C)	57 (14)	65 (18)	81 (27)	87 (31)	95 (35)	95 (35)	95 (35)	94 (34)	93 (34)	82 (28)	69 (21)	59 (15)	95 (35)
Mean maximum °F (°C)	46.4 (8.0)	47.2 (8.4)	56.7 (13.7)	70.9 (21.6)	82.5 (28.1)	88.4 (31.3)	89.3 (31.8)	88.8 (31.6)	84.3 (29.1)	72.5 (22.5)	61.8 (16.6)	50.9 (10.5)	92.0 (33.3)
Mean daily maximum °F (°C)	25.2 (−3.8)	27.8 (−2.3)	37.7 (3.2)	49.9 (9.9)	63.9 (17.7)	73.7 (23.2)	78.1 (25.6)	77.3 (25.2)	69.7 (20.9)	56.6 (13.7)	43.6 (6.4)	31.6 (−0.2)	52.9 (11.6)
Daily mean °F (°C)	13.4 (−10.3)	14.6 (−9.7)	25.7 (−3.5)	38.9 (3.8)	50.8 (10.4)	60.9 (16.1)	65.8 (18.8)	64.6 (18.1)	56.4 (13.6)	44.4 (6.9)	33.9 (1.1)	21.4 (−5.9)	40.9 (5.0)
Mean daily minimum °F (°C)	1.6 (−16.9)	1.5 (−16.9)	13.8 (−10.1)	27.9 (−2.3)	37.6 (3.1)	48.1 (8.9)	53.5 (11.9)	51.9 (11.1)	43.1 (6.2)	32.2 (0.1)	24.1 (−4.4)	11.2 (−11.6)	28.9 (−1.7)
Mean minimum °F (°C)	−21.3 (−29.6)	−20.8 (−29.3)	−11.7 (−24.3)	16.0 (−8.9)	26.1 (−3.3)	33.9 (1.1)	41.3 (5.2)	37.3 (2.9)	28.4 (−2.0)	20.2 (−6.6)	5.7 (−14.6)	−11.4 (−24.1)	−25.3 (−31.8)
Record low °F (°C)	−36 (−38)	−31 (−35)	−28 (−33)	−3 (−19)	21 (−6)	24 (−4)	36 (2)	32 (0)	23 (−5)	15 (−9)	−12 (−24)	−38 (−39)	−38 (−39)
Average precipitation inches (mm)	3.44 (87)	3.30 (84)	3.48 (88)	3.58 (91)	3.67 (93)	3.54 (90)	4.08 (104)	3.75 (95)	3.79 (96)	4.65 (118)	4.14 (105)	4.14 (105)	45.56 (1,156)
Average snowfall inches (cm)	23.2 (59)	22.1 (56)	22.1 (56)	5.1 (13)	0.0 (0.0)	0.0 (0.0)	0.0 (0.0)	0.0 (0.0)	0.0 (0.0)	1.4 (3.6)	4.4 (11)	17.4 (44)	95.7 (242.6)
Average precipitation days (≥ 0.01 in)	10.1	7.8	9.6	10.6	11.1	12.2	12.5	9.2	10.1	11.0	11.3	10.4	125.9
Average snowy days (≥ 0.1 in)	7.1	6.5	5.3	2.2	0.0	0.0	0.0	0.0	0.0	0.7	2.5	5.5	29.8
Source 1: NOAA
Source 2: National Weather Service

== Demographics ==
Historical population
Census	Pop.	Note	%±
1840	45		—
1850	168		273.3%
1860	283		68.5%
1870	313		10.6%
1880	612		95.5%
1890	1,063		73.7%
1900	1,092		2.7%
1910	1,295		18.6%
1920	1,201		−7.3%
1930	1,467		22.1%
1940	1,348		−8.1%
1950	1,174		−12.9%
1960	821		−30.1%
1970	794		−3.3%
1980	826		4.0%
1990	710		−14.0%
2000	629		−11.4%
2010	589		−6.4%
2020	587		−0.3%
U.S. Decennial Census

=== 2010 census ===
At the 2010 census there were 589 people, 249 households, and 164 families living in the town. The population density was 10.9 inhabitants per square mile (4.2/km^{2}). There were 582 housing units at an average density of 10.8 per square mile (4.2/km^{2}). The racial makeup of the town was 95.6% White, 0.2% African American, 1.2% Native American, 1.0% from other races, and 2.0% from two or more races. Hispanic or Latino of any race were 0.2%.

Of the 249 households 26.5% had children under the age of 18 living with them, 47.0% were married couples living together, 10.8% had a female householder with no husband present, 8.0% had a male householder with no wife present, and 34.1% were non-families. 29.7% of households were one person and 10.8% were one person aged 65 or older. The average household size was 2.33 and the average family size was 2.76.

The median age in the town was 46.3 years. 20.9% of residents were under the age of 18; 6.9% were between the ages of 18 and 24; 21% were from 25 to 44; 30.6% were from 45 to 64; and 20.7% were 65 or older. The gender makeup of the town was 50.4% male and 49.6% female.

=== 2000 census ===
At the 2000 census there were 629 people, 263 households, and 175 families living in the town. The population density was 11.6 inhabitants per square mile (4.5/km^{2}). There were 544 housing units at an average density of 10.0 per square mile (3.9/km^{2}). The racial makeup of the town was 99.68% White, 0.16% Native American and 0.16% Asian. Of the 263 households 28.1% had children under the age of 18 living with them, 49.4% were married couples living together, 12.2% had a female householder with no husband present, and 33.1% were non-families. 30.4% of households were one person and 16.7% were one person aged 65 or older. The average household size was 2.34 and the average family size was 2.84.

The age distribution was 23.7% under the age of 18, 4.8% from 18 to 24, 22.6% from 25 to 44, 27.7% from 45 to 64, and 21.3% 65 or older. The median age was 44 years. For every 100 females, there were 101.6 males. For every 100 females age 18 and over, there were 94.3 males.

The median household income was $20,769 and the median family income was $25,341. Males had a median income of $32,083 versus $17,083 for females. The per capita income for the town was $11,079. About 21.6% of families and 23.4% of the population were below the poverty line, including 27.2% of those under age 18 and 18.4% of those age 65 or over.

== Education ==
It is in the School Administrative District 14. The PreK-12 school of that district is the East Grand School. In 2023 enrollment was 135, including 46 in high school.

In 1992 William Grant became the principal of East Grand School. In 2000 the school received a program in which students could get live instruction from a teacher in Houlton.
