= U.S. Route 81 in North Dakota =

Segment of American highway

U.S. Highway 81
- US 81 highlighted in red

Route information
- Maintained by NDDOT
- Length: 247.457 mi (398.243 km)

Major junctions
- South end: I-29 / US 81 at the South Dakota state line near Hankinson
- ND 13 near Mooreton; I-94 / US 52 in Fargo; US 10 / I-94 BL in Fargo; ND 200 by Hillsboro; US 2 in Grand Forks; ND 5 in Hamilton
- North end: PTH 75 at the Canadian border in Pembina

Location
- Country: United States
- State: North Dakota
- Counties: Richland, Cass, Traill, Grand Forks, Walsh, Pembina

Highway system
- United States Numbered Highway System; List; Special; Divided; North Dakota State Highway System; Interstate; US; State
| ← ND 73 | → US 83 |

U.S. Route 81 (US 81) is a part of the U.S. Highway System that travels from Fort Worth, Texas, to the Pembina–Emerson Border Crossing near Pembina. In the state of North Dakota, US 81 extends from the South Dakota border north to the Canada-United States border.

== Route description ==
U.S. 81 enters North Dakota concurrently with Interstate 29 (I-29). It heads north from the South Dakota border, passing near Hankinson and a junction with ND 11 and junctions ND 13 about ten miles west of the city of Wahpeton, and then heads north towards Fargo, where it has a business route US 81 Bus. from exit 60 to exit 67. In Fargo, it passes near West Acres Mall, Hector International Airport and North Dakota State University. Then it passes Hillsboro and a junction with ND 200 and heads north to Thompson, to the north and west sides of the city of Grand Forks, where it has another business route from exit 138 to exit 145, past Alerus Center, Columbia Mall, and the University of North Dakota. There it splits off from I-29 and heads to the northwest, passing through the city of Manvel. It parallels I-29 about 10 miles west, passing by the towns of Minto, Grafton, and St. Thomas, before joining ND 5 in Hamilton, near Cavalier. It rejoins I-29 and continues to the US–Canada border at Pembina. The original route of US 81 survives as ND 127 and County Road 81 in Richland, Cass, Traill, and Grand Forks counties.

== Major intersections ==
Exit numbers are I-29 exit numbers.

| County | Location | mi | km | Exit | Destinations | Notes |
|---|---|---|---|---|---|---|
| Richland | Greendale Township | 0.000 | 0.000 | | I-29 south / US 81 south – Sioux Falls | Continuation into South Dakota |
| Richland | Greendale Township | 0.013 | 0.021 | 1 | CR 1E | |
| Richland | | 2.074 | 3.338 | 2 | CR 22 | |
| Richland | Waldo Township | 8.073 | 12.992 | 8 | ND 11 – Hankinson, Fairmount | |
| Richland | Brandenburg Township | 15.079 | 24.267 | 15 | CR 16 – Great Bend, Mantador | |
| Richland | Mooreton Township | 22.583 | 36.344 | 23 | ND 13 – Wahpeton, Mooreton | Signed as exits 23A (east) and 23B (west) southbound; Also access to Bagg Bonanza Farm, Chahinkapa Zoo, North Dakota State College of Science |
| Richland | Ibsen Township | 26.030 | 41.891 | 26 | Dwight | |
| Richland | Abercrombie Township | 31.038 | 49.951 | 31 | CR 8 – Galchutt | |
| Richland | Colfax Township | 37.047 | 59.621 | 37 | CR 4 – Colfax, Abercrombie | |
| Richland | Colfax–Walcott township line | 42.117 | 67.781 | 42 | CR 2 – Walcott | |
| Richland | Walcott Township | 44.126 | 71.014 | 44 | Christine | |
| Richland–Cass county line | Walcott–Pleasant township line | 48.182 | 77.541 | 48 | ND 46 – Kindred | |
| Cass | Pleasant Township | 50.186 | 80.767 | 50 | CR 18 – Hickson, Oxbow | |
| Cass | Pleasant–Stanley township line | 54.167 | 87.173 | 54 | CR 16 – Oxbow, Davenport | |
| Cass | Stanley Township | 56.429 | 90.814 | 56 | Wild Rice, Horace | |
| Cass | Fargo | 60.252 | 96.966 | 60 | US 81 Bus. north (52nd Avenue South) | Southern terminus of US 81 Bus. |
| Cass | Fargo | 62.249 | 100.180 | 62 | 32nd Avenue South | Signed as exits 62A (east) and 62B (west) southbound |
| Cass | Fargo | 63.267 | 101.818 | 63 | I-94 / US 52 – Bismarck, Minneapolis | Signed as exits 63A (east) and 63B (west); I-94 exits 349A-B; also access to Moorhead |
| Cass | Fargo | 64.252 | 103.404 | 64 | 38th Street Southwest, 13th Avenue South | Access to West Acres Mall |
| Cass | Fargo | 65.252 | 105.013 | 65 | I-94 BL (Main Avenue) / US 10 – Downtown Fargo, West Fargo | Also access to Bonanzaville USA, Red River Valley Fairgrounds, Hjemkomst Center |
| Cass | Fargo | 66.255 | 106.627 | 66 | ND 294 east (12th Avenue North) | Western terminus of ND 294; Also access to North Dakota State University, Fargodome, Newman Outdoor Field |
| Cass | Fargo | 67.258 | 108.241 | 67 | US 81 Bus. south (19th Avenue North) | Northern terminus of US 81 Bus.; also access to North Dakota State University, Fargodome, Newman Outdoor Field, Hector International Airport, Air Museum, VA Hospital, North Dakota Horse Park |
| Cass | Fargo | 69.374 | 111.647 | 69 | CR 20 (40th Avenue North) – Reile's Acres | Also access to Fargo National Cemetery |
| Cass | Harwood | 72.778 | 117.125 | 72 | Harwood | Formerly exit 73 |
| Cass | Argusville | 78.542 | 126.401 | 78 | Argusville | Formerly exit 79 |
| Cass | Gardner | 85.826 | 138.124 | 85 | Gardner | Formerly exit 86 |
| Cass–Traill county line | Kinyon–Kelso township line | 92.142 | 148.288 | 92 | Grandin | |
| Traill | Hillsboro Township | 100.391 | 161.564 | 100 | ND 200 east – Halstad ND 200A west – Blanchard | |
| Traill | Hillsboro | | | 104 | Hillsboro | |
| Traill | Eldorado–Ervin township line | 110.795 | 178.307 | 111 | ND 200 – Mayville, Cummings | Also access to Mayville State University |
| Traill | Stavanger Township | 117.987 | 189.882 | 118 | Buxton | |
| Traill–Grand Forks county line | Stavanger–Americus township line | 123.001 | 197.951 | 123 | CR 25 – Reynolds | |
| Grand Forks | Walle Township | 130.043 | 209.284 | 130 | ND 15 west – Thompson CR 81A east | |
| Grand Forks | Grand Forks | 138.146 | 222.324 | 138 | US 81 Bus. north (32nd Avenue South) | Southern terminus of US 81 Bus.; also access to Alerus Center, Columbia Mall |
| Grand Forks | Grand Forks | 140.195 | 225.622 | 140 | ND 297 east (DeMers Avenue) – Downtown | Western terminus of ND 297; also access to University of North Dakota, Alerus Center |
| Grand Forks | Grand Forks | 141.196 | 227.233 | 141 | US 2 (Gateway Drive) – Downtown | Also access to Ralph Engelstad Arena, Grand Forks AFB, Grand Forks International Airport |
| Grand Forks | Grand Forks | 144.711 | 232.890 | 145 | US 81 Bus. south (North Washington Street) | Northern terminus of US 81 Bus. |
| Grand Forks | Ferry Township | 152.211 | 244.960 | 152 | US 81 north – Manvel, Gilby | |
| Grand Forks | Manvel | 152.211 | 244.960 | | I-29 north / CR 33 east – Winnipeg | North end of I-29 concurrency |
| Walsh | Grafton | 190.775 | 307.023 | | ND 17 east – I-29 | South end of ND 17 concurrency |
| Walsh | Grafton | 190.993 | 307.373 | | ND 17 west – Park River | North end of ND 17 concurrency |
| Pembina | St. Thomas Township | 202.271 | 325.524 | | ND 66 east – Drayton | South end of ND 66 concurrency |
| Pembina | St. Thomas | 204.273 | 328.746 | | ND 66 west – Crystal | North end of ND 66 concurrency |
| Pembina | St. Thomas | 204.729 | 329.479 | | ND 91 north | Southern terminus of ND 91 |
| Pembina | St. Thomas | 206.414 | 332.191 | | ND 91 south | Northern terminus of ND 91 |
| Pembina | Hamilton | 218.530 | 351.690 | | ND 5 west – Cavalier | South end of ND 5 concurrency |
| Pembina | Joliette Township | 228.353 | 367.499 | 203 | I-29 south / ND 5 east – Grand Forks | South end of I-29 concurrency, north end of ND 5 concurrency |
| Pembina | Joliette Township | 233.413 | 375.642 | 208 | CR 1 – Bathgate | |
| Pembina | Pembina Township | 242.657 | 390.519 | 212 | No name exit | |
| Pembina | Pembina | 245.177 | 394.574 | 215 | ND 59 / CR 55 – Neche, Pembina | |
| Pembina | Pembina Township | 247.457 | 398.243 | Canadian border at the Pembina–Emerson Border Crossing | | |
| Pembina | Pembina Township | 247.457 | 398.243 | | PTH 75 north – Winnipeg | National northern terminus of US 81 and I-29; formerly PTH 29; continuation into Manitoba |
1.000 mi = 1.609 km; 1.000 km = 0.621 mi: Concurrency terminus

U.S. Route 81
| Previous state: South Dakota | North Dakota | Next state: Terminus |
