= Pembina–Emerson Border Crossing =

Port of entry between Canada and United States

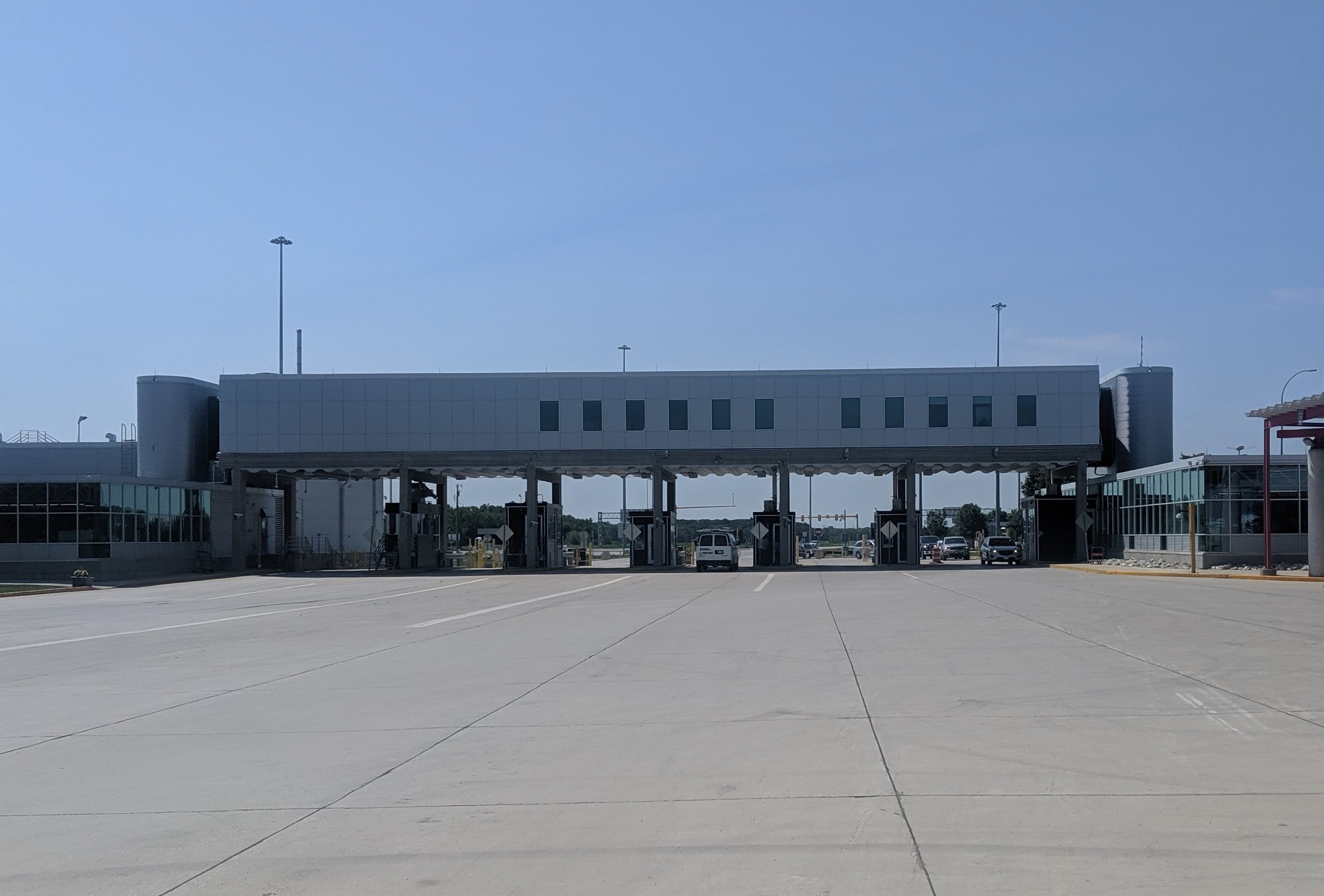
- Canada-U.S. border crossing at Emerson port of entry in Manitoba

Locaiton
- Country: United States; Canada
- Location: I-29 / US 81 / PTH 75; US Port: 10980 Interstate 29 / U.S. Route 81, Pembina, North Dakota 58271; Canadian Port: Manitoba Highway 75, Emerson, Manitoba R0A 0L0
- Coordinates: 49.000477°N 97.237634°W

Details
- Opened: 1871

Website
- www.cbp.gov/contact/ports/pembina-area-port

The Pembina–Emerson Border Crossing is a United States-Canada port of entry (POE) that connects the U.S. city of Pembina, North Dakota and the Canadian community of Emerson, Manitoba. On the American side, the crossing is connected by Interstate 29 (I-29) and U.S. Route 81 in Pembina County, while the Canadian side is connected by Manitoba Highway 75 in the Municipality of Emerson – Franklin.

Over one million travellers are processed at this border crossing each year, making it the second busiest along the Canada–United States border west of the Great Lakes, behind only the Pacific Highway Border Crossing between British Columbia and Washington state. The Pembina border station is the easternmost in North Dakota, located approximately 300 metres (980 feet) west of the Red River of the North, the state's boundary with Minnesota. A separate border crossing between Emerson and nearby Noyes, Minnesota was in operation until 2006.

The POE sits along an international trade corridor, making it an important commercial port for both countries. It is among the top five Canada-US crossings in terms of truck trade value, which was at CA$16.9 billion (approx.) in 2011. Likewise, around 360,000 commercial trucks crossed at this location in that year, which grew to around 400,000 by 2013. This number is forecast to grow by about 58% by the year 2035. The Pembina and Emerson ports also manage the rail inspection stations next to the former Noyes–Emerson East border crossing, where the BNSF Railway connects with the Canadian National Railway and the Canadian Pacific Railway connects with the Soo Line Railroad, its U.S. subsidiary.

== History ==
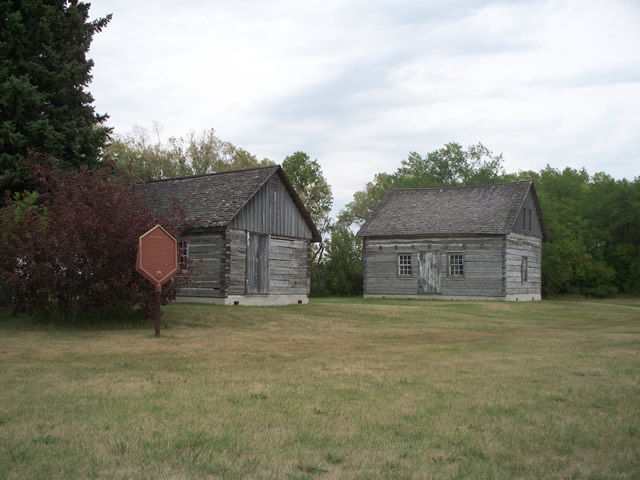
Original Emerson Customs facilities in West Lynne

In 1871, the port of Emerson was established as the first land border customs station in Canada. It was created to protect and ultimately collect duty for trade with the Hudson's Bay Company trading post that was attacked in a Fenian Raid, and subsequently liberated by the U.S. Cavalry earlier that year. Though no longer active, the original customs building in Emerson still stands today.

For many years, there were two roads entering Canada at Emerson: the popular Jefferson Highway (U.S. Route 75) entered from Noyes, Minnesota, and the Meridian Highway (U.S. Route 81) entered from Pembina, North Dakota. All Canada-bound traffic was directed to the brick customs building in downtown Emerson, which has since been converted into the Emerson Health Centre. In the mid-1950s, Canada built separate inspection stations at the border on both roads. The crossing across from Pembina was called "West Lynne"—the name of the small village that had been absorbed by the Town of Emerson in 1883—while the larger crossing across from Noyes was known as "Emerson East."

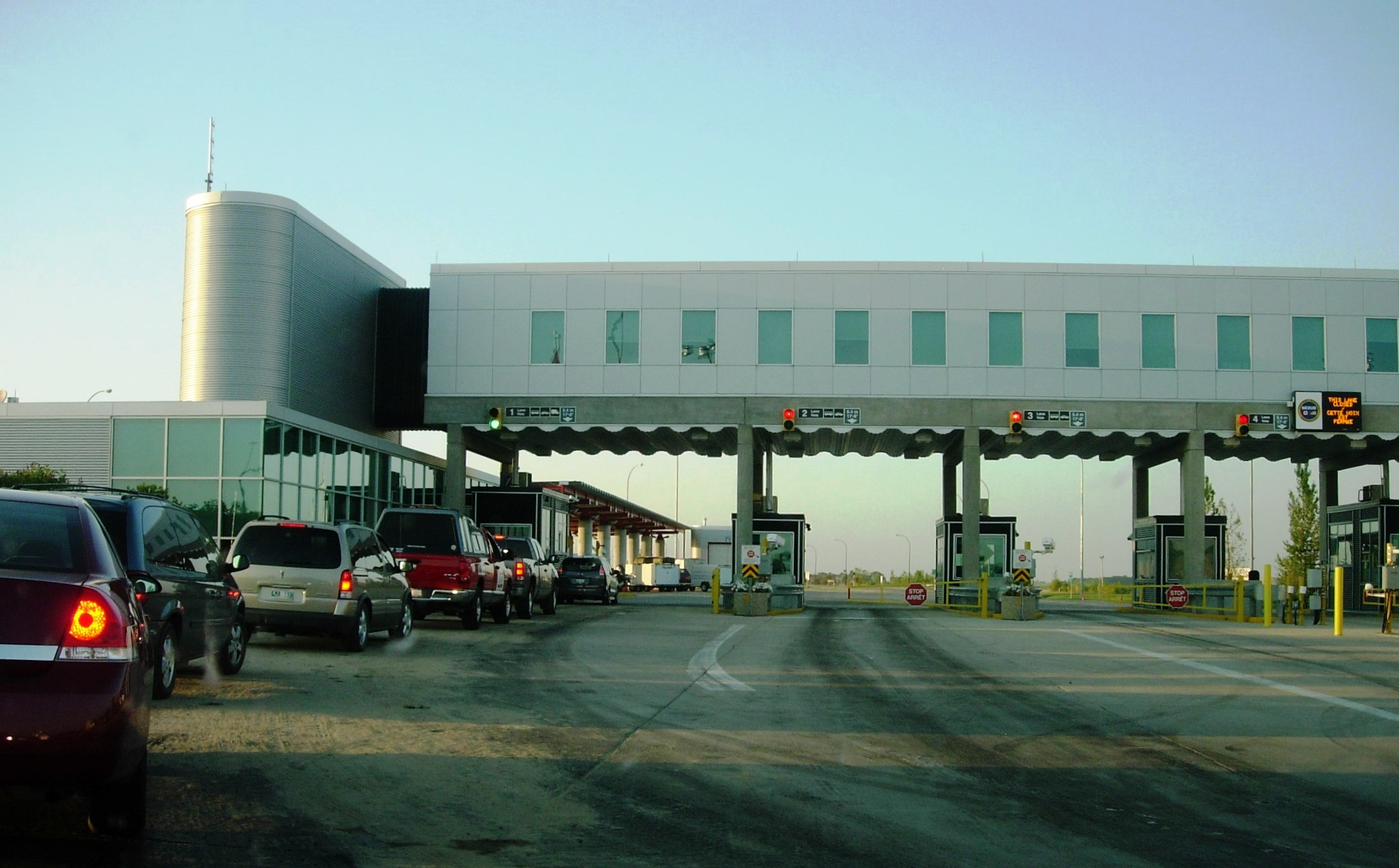
Emerson border station prior to expansion

The modern Pembina–West Lynne border crossing opened in 1964 while I-29 was under construction (the final section of I-29 from Joliette to the border was not completed until 1977). The facilities on the former U.S. Route 81 located a short distance to the east were closed and demolished a few years later. The completion of I-29, together with the reconfiguration of Manitoba Highways 75 and 29 in the 1980s, diverted most cross-border traffic to Pembina–West Lynne, which supplanted Noyes–Emerson East as the region's main crossing for both commercial and passenger traffic. The Canadian and American governments closed the Emerson East and Noyes border stations in 2003 and 2006, respectively, and merged rail inspection operations with the ports at West Lynne and Pembina. The West Lynne border station was renamed Emerson following the closure of Emerson East in 2003.

Both countries initiated expansion projects in 2017 to significantly upgrade facilities and road infrastructure at the border crossing. This was the first renovation project for the U.S. POE since 1996 and for the Canadian POE since 1999. The upgrades at the border station were completed in 2018; however Manitoba's provincial government remains in the process of redeveloping PTH 75 at Emerson. A proposal was submitted by local authorities in 2019 to establish a port authority on the Canadian side to manage commercial activities and public infrastructure in the vicinity of the Emerson border station. This proposal remains under review by federal and provincial authorities as of October 2020.

Fort Dufferin is a Canadian historic site located near the Pembina–Emerson crossing. The fort is a former Canadian police post and base for the North American Boundary Commission, which surveyed and marked the international border as defined in the Treaty of 1818. Fort Dufferin was later used as a customs and immigration for steamboats entering Canada via the Red River.

== Illegal immigration ==
The number of persons crossing the border illegally into Canada (referred to as "irregular migrants") through the Emerson-Pembina-Noyes area increased significantly following then-U.S. President Donald Trump's Protecting the Nation from Foreign Terrorist Entry into the United States executive order in January 2017. However, the port had begun to see a considerable increase of irregular migration as of early 2016, prior to the election of Trump as president later that year.

The increased levels of asylum seekers trying to enter Canada at the Pembina-Emerson and former Noyes-Emerson border crossings and other regions along the international border have garnered international media attention, resulting in the Canadian government renegotiating the Safe Third Country Agreement with the U.S. government.

The majority of recent irregular migration has been by migrants from African nations seeking asylum in Canada to avoid potential deportation from the U.S. Although persons claiming refugee status are not permitted to migrate to Canada from the U.S. (or vice versa) under the two countries' Safe Third Country Agreement, asylum seekers who have crossed the border illegally in some cases have been allowed to stay in Canada while their applications are processed.

The practice of crossing the border illegally is not without danger, especially during the cold prairie winter. On December 24, 2016, two Ghanaian men successfully made it across the border into Canada by walking several miles along the Red River in sub-zero temperatures but suffered severe frostbite that required amputation of their fingers. A 57-year old Ghanaian asylum seeker died of hypothermia while attempting to cross into Canada via the closed Emerson–Noyes border crossing in May 2017. In January 2022, four members of an Indian family, including an infant, were found dead in a field near the border approximately ten kilometres (six miles) east of Emerson. The family was part of a larger group attempting to enter the U.S. during a cold spell in which local overnight temperatures had dropped to −35 °C (−31 °F) with the wind chill. This case led to the arrest and conviction of Harshkumar Ramanlal Patel, 29, an Indian national, and Steve Shand, 50, an American from Florida on human trafficking charges. In Canada, Fenil Patel was arrested in Toronto for his role in bringing the family to Winnipeg prior to their deaths.

== See also ==
- List of Canada–United States border crossings
- International Mid-Continent Trade Corridor
- Noyes–Emerson East Border Crossing
