= North Dakota Highway 91 (Pembina County) =

State highway in North Dakota, U.S.

North Dakota Highway 91

Route information
- Maintained by NDDOT
- Length: 1.262 mi (2.031 km)

Major junctions
- South end: US 81 in St. Thomas
- North end: US 81 in St. Thomas

Location
- Country: United States
- State: North Dakota
- Counties: Pembina

Highway system
- North Dakota State Highway System; Interstate; US; State
← ND 89	→ ND 97

North Dakota Highway 91 (ND 91) is a 1.262-mile-long (2.031 km) north–south state highway in the U.S. state of North Dakota. ND 91's southern terminus is at U.S. Route 81 (US 81) south of St. Thomas, and the northern terminus is at US 81 north of St. Thomas.

== Major intersections ==
The entire route is in St. Thomas, Pembina County.

mi	km	Destinations	Notes
0.000	0.000	US 81	Southern terminus
1.262	2.031	US 81	Northern terminus
1.000 mi = 1.609 km; 1.000 km = 0.621 mi
