= Noyes–Emerson East Border Crossing =

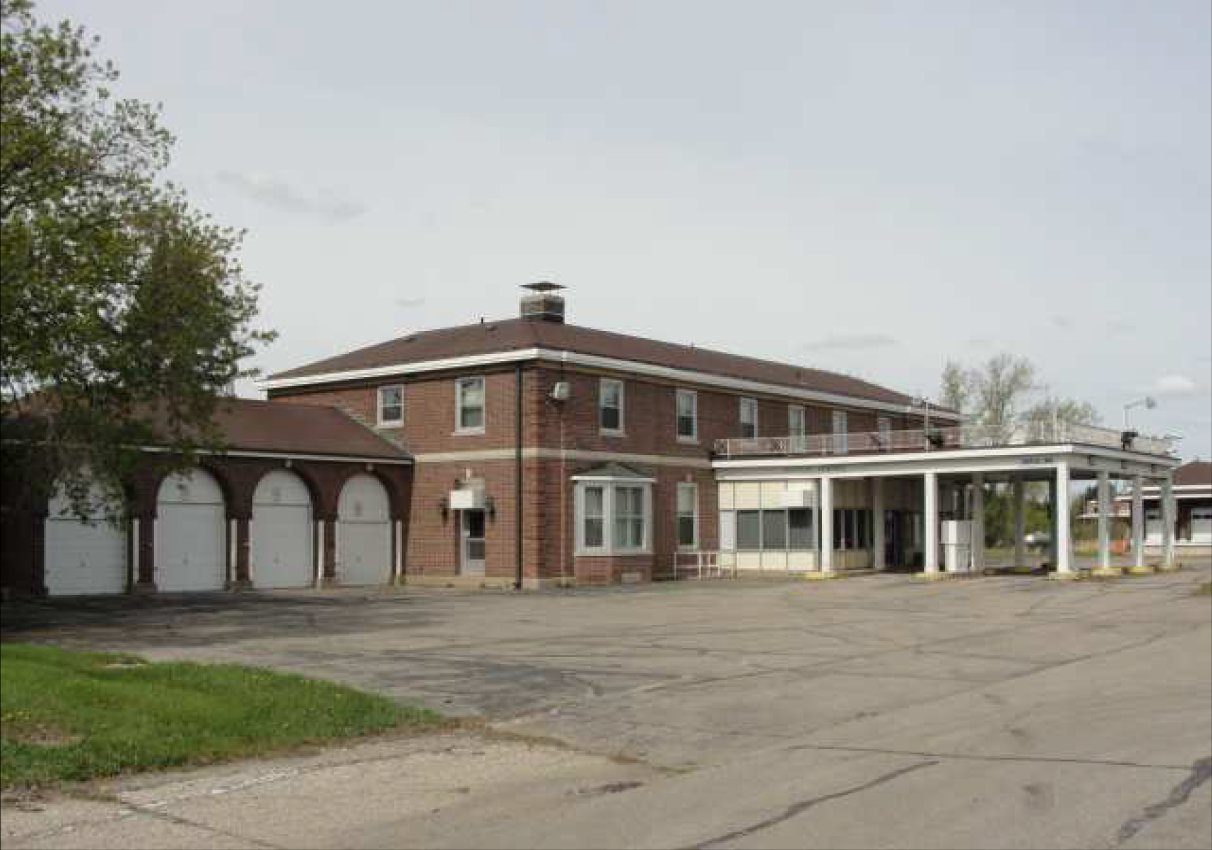
- Former Noyes Customs and Immigration Station

Locaiton
- Country: United States; Canada
- Location: US 75 / PTH 75; US Port: 4142 US Highway 75, Noyes, Minnesota 56740; Canadian Port: Provincial Trunk Highway 75, Emerson, Manitoba R0A 0L0
- Coordinates: 49.000448°N 97.207301°W

Details
- Closed: Canadian: June 8, 2003; US: July 10, 2006

The Noyes–Emerson East Border Crossing is a closed Canada–United States port of entry that formerly connected the communities of Noyes, Minnesota, and Emerson, Manitoba. On the American side, the crossing was connected by US Highway 75 (US 75) in Kittson County, while the Canadian side was connected by Provincial Trunk Highway 75 (PTH 75) in the Town of Emerson (now the Municipality of Emerson – Franklin). During the early and mid-20th century, it was one of the busiest road and rail border crossings west of the Great Lakes. The road crossing has been closed since 2006; all cross-border traffic is now diverted to the nearby Pembina–Emerson Border Crossing.

== History ==
The first border station in the region was constructed in 1871 at West Lynne, Manitoba (now part of Emerson) on the west side of the Red River of the North. With the rise in popularity of automobile travel and the construction of the Jefferson Highway, which crossed into Canada at Noyes, the United States opened a border station on the east side of the river in the 1910s. The new crossing quickly became one of the busiest along the Canada–US border. In 1931, the US constructed a large new station and rerouted US 75 to replace the Jefferson Highway. The US Inspection Station at Noyes, one of the first purpose-built border stations in North America, still stands today and is listed in the National Register of Historic Places.

For many years, the town of Emerson, Manitoba had two border crossings: one on the west side of the Red River opposite Pembina, North Dakota (US Highway 81) and the one on the east side opposite Noyes (US 75). On the Canadian side, both crossings were served by a single customs building located in downtown Emerson. Separate stations were built in the mid-1950s: the station opposite Pembina was called "West Lynne" while the larger station opposite Noyes was known as "Emerson East".

In 1949, the Manitoba government realigned PTH 75 (originally numbered as PTH 14) to connect with US 75. A short road was built to connect to the Pembina–West Lynne Border Crossing on the west side of the river. Noyes-Emerson East remained the primary of the two border crossings into the 1960s and 70s; however, this changed after Interstate 29 (I-29) replaced US 81 and new, modern border stations were constructed by both countries at Pembina and West Lynne. Traffic at the Noyes–Emerson East crossing declined substantially as most vehicles began diverting to the new Interstate highway and facilities at Pembina–West Lynne. The shift in traffic was further compounded when the Manitoba government realigned the PTH 75/29 junction at Emerson in 1985 to serve the Pembina–West Lynne facilities.

=== Closure ===
Although the Noyes–Emerson East ports of entry were still moderately used in the early 2000s, mainly by local residents, the Canadian government closed its border station as a cost-saving measure in 2003. Remaining operations were merged with the West Lynne port of entry (afterwards renamed "Emerson"). The former Emerson East border station was demolished in 2004 and the property later divested by the Canadian government. Only US-bound traffic was permitted until 2006, when the US closed its port of entry and the road between the former border stations was permanently barricaded. United States Customs and Border Protection continued to occupy the Noyes border station until 2011. The border station and property were later put up for sale.

Today, all cross-border traffic wishing to continue on PTH 75 in Manitoba or US 75 in Minnesota must detour through the Pembina–Emerson (West Lynne) ports of entry. US 75 meets a dead end at Noyes, and PTH 75 has been realigned to connect with I-29. The Lancaster–Tolstoi Border Crossing is now the westernmost border crossing between Minnesota and Manitoba.

The adjacent rail crossing and inspection facilities remain in operation and are managed by the Pembina and Emerson ports of entry.

== Illegal immigration ==
The border crossing's location and remaining infrastructure have made it a common site for illegal border crossing. The former port began to see an increase in illegal crossings into Canada following Executive Order 13769 from US President Donald Trump in 2017. The increased levels of asylum seekers trying to enter Canada at the current Pembina–Emerson and former Noyes–Emerson border crossings and other regions along the border have garnered international media attention, resulting in the Canadian government renegotiating the Safe Third Country Agreement with the US government. The practice of crossing the border illegally can be dangerous. A 57-year old Ghanaian asylum seeker died of hypothermia while attempting to cross into Canada from Noyes in May 2017, while four members of a family were found dead in a field approximately ten kilometers east of Emerson while attempting to enter the U.S. during −35 °C (−31 °F) temperatures in January 2022.

== See also ==
- List of Canada–United States border crossings
- Jefferson Highway
