= Pleasant Township, Cass County, North Dakota =

Township in North Dakota, US

Pleasant Township, North Dakota
- Township
- Location within North Dakota
- Coordinates: 46°40′26″N 96°51′20″W
- Country: United States
- State: North Dakota
- County: Cass

Area
  - Total: 35.55 sq mi (92.08 km^{2})
  - Land: 35.49 sq mi (91.91 km^{2})
  - Water: 0.066 sq mi (0.17 km^{2})
- Elevation: 915 ft (279 m)

Population (2020)
  - Total: 367
  - Density: 10.3/sq mi (3.99/km^{2})
- Time zone: UTC-6 (Central (CST))
  - Summer (DST): UTC-5 (CDT)
- Area code: 701
- FIPS code: 38-63100
- GNIS feature ID: 1036351

Pleasant Township is a township in Cass County, North Dakota, United States. The population was 367 at the 2020 census.

The unincorporated community of Hickson is located in Pleasant Township.

== Geography ==
Pleasant Township has a total area of 35.554 square miles (92.08 km^{2}), of which 35.487 square miles (91.91 km^{2}) is land and 0.017 square miles (0.044 km^{2}) is water.

=== Major highways ===
- Interstate 29
- U.S. Highway 81
- North Dakota Highway 46

== Demographics ==
As of the 2023 American Community Survey, there were an estimated 235 households.
