= U.S. Route 81 =

Numbered U.S. Highway in the United States

U.S. Route 81
- US 81 highlighted in red

Route information
- Length: 1,220 mi (1,960 km)
- Existed: 1926–present

Major junctions
- South end: I-35W / US 287 at Fort Worth, TX
- I-44 at Chickasha, OK; I-40 at El Reno, OK; I-135 from Wichita, KS to Salina, KS; I-70 near Salina, KS; I-80 at York NE; I-90 at Salem, SD; I-29 from Watertown, SD to Manvel, ND; I-94 / US 52 at Fargo, ND; US 2 at Grand Forks, ND; I-29 from Joliette, ND to Pembina, ND
- North end: PTH 75 at Pembina–Emerson Border Crossing near Pembina, ND

Location
- Country: United States
- States: Texas, Oklahoma, Kansas, Nebraska, South Dakota, North Dakota

Highway system
- United States Numbered Highway System; List; Special; Divided
← US 80	→ US 82

U.S. Route 81 or U.S. Highway 81 (US 81) is a major north–south U.S. highway that extends for 1,220 miles (1,960 km) in the central United States and is one of the original United States Numbered Highways established in 1926 by the American Association of State Highway Officials.

The route of US 81 follows that of the old Meridian Highway (so called because it roughly followed the Sixth Principal Meridian of the US Public Land Survey System) which dates back as early as 1911. The highway has alternately (and unofficially) been known as part of the Pan-American Highway. In the segment in the state of Oklahoma, the highway closely corresponds to the old Chisholm Trail for cattle drives from Texas to railheads in Kansas in the 1860s and 1870s.

As of 2025, the highway's northern terminus is just north of Pembina, North Dakota, at the Canadian border. At this point, it is routed along Interstate 29 (I-29) and continues northward into Manitoba on Highway 75, which leads to Winnipeg.

Its southern terminus is in Fort Worth, Texas, at an intersection with I-35W and US 287. From the route's first year of existence to 1991, US 81's southern terminus was at the Mexican border in Laredo, Texas. In 1991, the terminus was truncated to San Antonio. The route was shortened again to its present length of 1,234 miles (1,986 km) in 1993, when the terminus was moved to Fort Worth. In both cases, the dropped portions of US 81 were replaced by I-35. Portions of former US 81 south of Fort Worth continue to exist as business loops of I-35; a section from Hillsboro to Fort Worth exists as State Highway 81.

The decommissioning of portions of US 81 that have been displaced by concurrent Interstate Highways means that US 81 no longer extends from the Canadian border to the Mexican border, while one of its auxiliary routes, US 281 does extend to both borders. As a result of decommissioning portions of US 81, the length of US 81 is actually 672 miles (1,081 km) miles shorter than US 281.

== Route description ==
=== Texas ===
US 81 at its inception in 1926 followed the route of State Highway 2, which began in Laredo and passed through San Antonio, Austin, Waco, and Fort Worth before passing over the Red River into Oklahoma four miles (6.4 km) north of Ringgold. The 1936 Official Map of the Highway System of Texas clearly shows the route labeled both as US 81 and SH 2. It was cosigned with US 83 for 18 miles (29 km) from Laredo to two miles (3.2 km) south of Webb, with US 79 for 18 miles (29 km) from Austin north to Round Rock, and with US 77 for 33 miles (53 km) from Waco to Hillsboro. In 1940 US 287 was extended south into Texas, and a 67-mile (108 km) stretch from Fort Worth northwest to Bowie was cosigned with US 81. The summer 1941 Texas Highway Map shows this pairing, and the current southern terminus of US 81 is still cosigned with US 287.

The spring and summer 1949 Texas Highway Department Official Map designates the length of US 81 from Laredo to Fort Worth as part of the National System of Interstate Highways, but no numeric designation was given.

It was not until 1959 that parts of US 81 in Texas appeared on the Texas Official Highway Travel Map cosigned with I-35 shields. Succeeding maps reflect the slow completion of I-35 and I-35W over the stretch of US 81 between Laredo and Fort Worth, with the 1978-79 Texas Official Highway Travel Map showing only a 14-mile (23 km) section from Encinal north to three miles (4.8 km) south of Artesia Wells as incomplete, and the 1980 Texas Official Highway Travel Map showing that section completed. In 1980, US 81 was cosigned with I-35 and I-35W except where the Interstate bypassed towns, with US 81 providing the main route through town and then reconnecting with I-35 on the other side. The longest section of US 81 in 1980 not cosigned with the Interstate ran from I-35 in Hillsboro 20 miles (32 km) north to I-35W, just north of Grandview.

=== Oklahoma ===
Enid, El Reno, Chickasha, and Duncan are major Oklahoma towns on the highway; historically, the small town of Hennessey is notable. Among the elders throughout the small towns that are dotted along US 81 in Oklahoma, the sixth meridian is commonly known among the locals as the "Indian Meridian" but US 81 is not known as the "Indian Meridian Highway". The El Reno tornado in May 2013, the largest tornado ever at 2.6 mi wide, also crossed US 81. The Indian Meridan is located some 40 miles (64 km) east and parallel of US 81. By pure coincidence, the Chisholm Trail of the post-Civil-War decades roughly followed along the corridor of present-day US 81; the region was not opened for settlement until several years after the cattle drives were discontinued; cultural memory harkened exclusively for many years to Indian Meridian Highway until recognition of the old cattle trail grew in the late 1900s.

=== Kansas ===
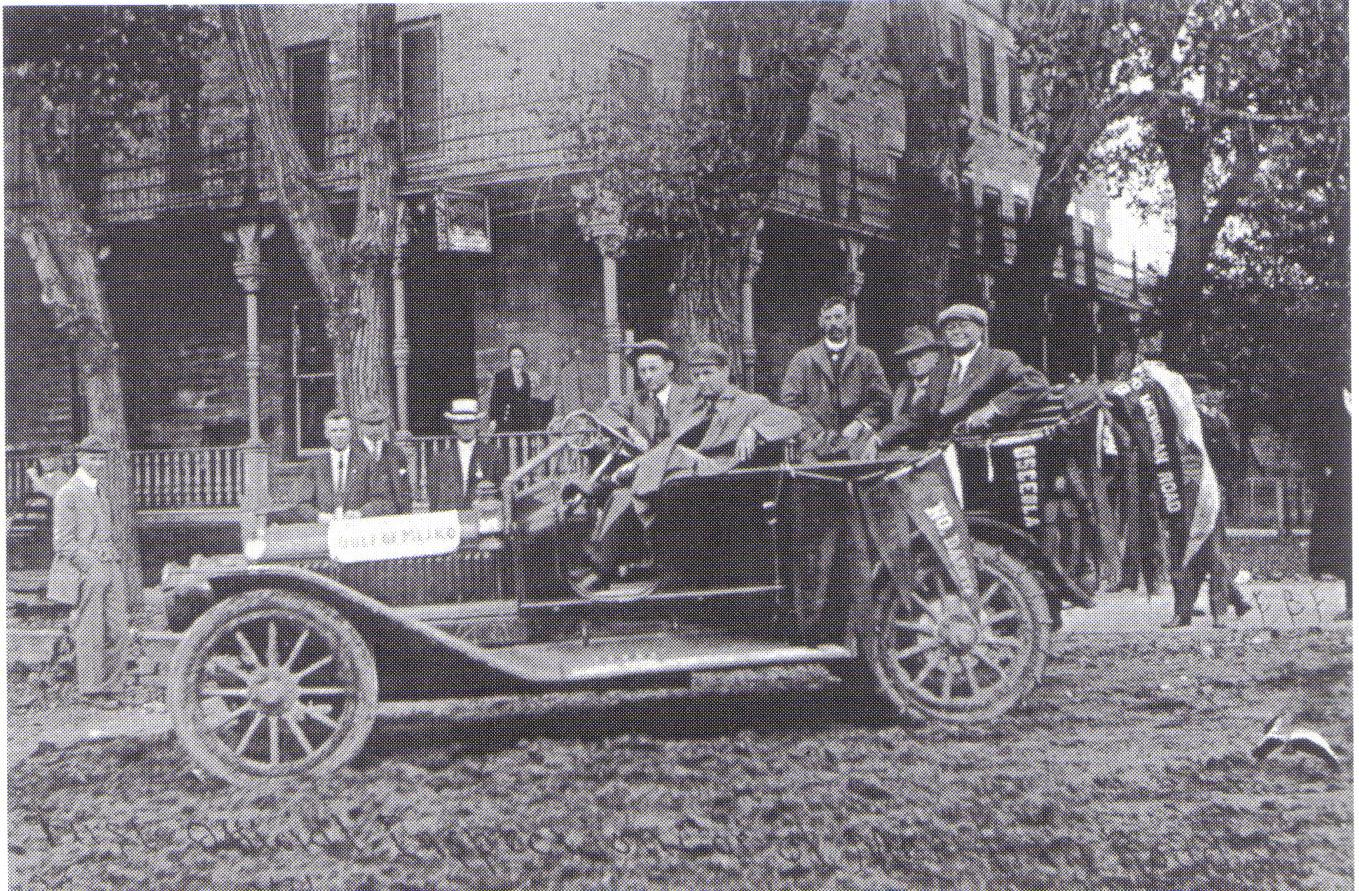
1912 Meridian Highway Inspection team in Concordia, Kansas

Nearly all of US 81 in Kansas is either freeway or expressway. The route enters Kansas as a two-lane near Caldwell. From South Haven to Wichita it closely parallels I-35, which is also known as the Kansas Turnpike in that area. After South Haven, the only town of any significance along US 81 until Wichita is Wellington, which is just west of the Turnpike along US 160.

At Wichita, US 81 joins I-135. The two highways remain joined until Salina; I-135's mile markers take precedence. I-135 ends at I-70 but US 81 continues as a freeway to Minneapolis, then as an expressway passing through Concordia before exiting the state north of Belleville.

The alignment of US 81 from Wichita to Salina prior to the completion I-135 is fully intact. The prior alignment ran from where current US 81 breaks off for I-135 at 47th street, north through Wichita along Broadway street. Old US 81 roughly parallels I-135 to Newton. Old US 81 follows current K-15 through Newton between an interchange with US 50 and Hesston Road, where old US 81 breaks northwest onto Hesston road. Old US 81 then travels through the small Kansas towns of Hesston, Moundridge, and Elyria, before turning to the north, and going through the town of McPherson as Main Street. North of McPherson, old US 81 continues to Lindsborg, where it follows current K-4 until an interchange with I-135. Old US 81 passes under I-135 and continues to parallel it about 1/2 mile (0.80 km) to the east. Old US 81 then travels through Assaria, where it encounters another brief overlap with K-4 and K-104. Old US 81 continues through the city of Salina as Ninth Street. North of Salina, Old US 81 encounters brief overlaps with K-143 and K-18. Old US 81 follows K-106 to an interchange with current US 81, where the two alignments are joined back together.

From Salina to the Nebraska state line, the highway is named the Frank Carlson Memorial Highway, in honor of the late Senator Frank Carlson. Senator Carlson was a native of Concordia who represented Kansas in the United States Senate from 1951 until 1969. Before serving in the Senate, he was Governor of Kansas from 1947 until 1950.

=== Nebraska ===
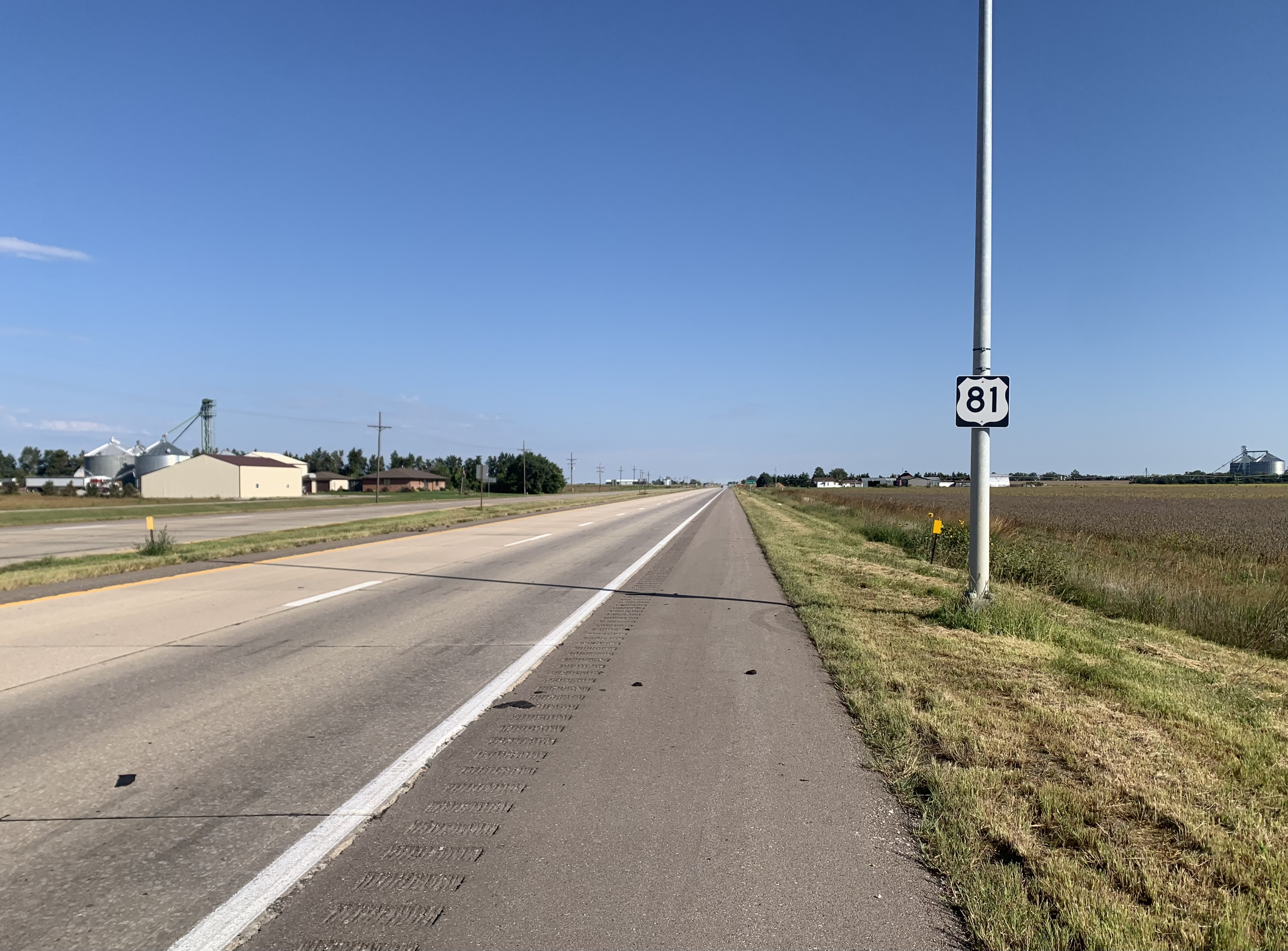
US Highway 81 in Thayer County, Nebraska

US 81 enters Nebraska as an expressway at Chester and continues as an expressway to York, where the highway intersects I-80. After a two-lane section going north from York and an overlap with Nebraska Highway 92 (N-92), US 81 again becomes an expressway at N-64. This expressway section passes through Columbus and Norfolk. North of Norfolk, US 81 is a two-lane, undivided highway which passes through no towns before exiting the state in Cedar County.

=== South Dakota ===
US 81 enters South Dakota by a Missouri River crossing, via the Discovery Bridge at Yankton. Its junction with I-90 is south of Salem. US 81 passes through Madison before it joins with I-29 at Watertown. The two highways remain concurrent through the rest of the state, leaving South Dakota near New Effington.

The South Dakota section of US 81, with the exception of a concurrency with US 14, is defined at South Dakota Codified Laws § 31-4-179.

=== North Dakota ===
US 81 enters North Dakota concurrently with I-29. It is paired with I-29 from the South Dakota border, passing through Fargo, to the north side of Grand Forks. There it splits off to the northwest, passing through the city of Manvel. It parallels I-29, passing through the town of Grafton before joining North Dakota Highway 5 (ND 5) near Cavalier. It rejoins I-29 and continues to the Canadian border at Pembina. The original route of US 81 survives as ND 127 and County Road 81 (CR 81) in Richland, Cass, Traill, and Grand Forks counties.

== History ==
US 81 started out as the Meridian Highway, an auto trail organized in 1911 to connect Winnipeg, Manitoba, Canada, to the Gulf of Mexico near the Sixth Principal Meridian. The southern terminus, initially at Galveston, was later moved to Laredo, where it would connect with a proposed extension to Mexico City (later built as part of the Pan-American Highway). Five of the six states along the route assigned a single number to the highway, mostly changing at the state line. (Kansas did not number its highways until 1926.) Planning to replace these designations—and the Meridian Highway name—began in 1925, when the Joint Board on Interstate Highways created a preliminary list of interstate routes to be marked by the states; the entire Meridian Highway was assigned US 81. The new number was officially adopted in late 1926.

The Interstate Highway System was approved in 1956, and included several routes that would replace much of US 81. I-35 followed the corridor from Laredo north to Wichita, where I-35 turned northeast towards Kansas City, with a branch—I-35W—continuing parallel to US 81 to Salina, Kansas. Between Fort Worth, Texas, and South Haven, Kansas, I-35 did not directly replace US 81, instead following US 77 through Oklahoma City, but replaced it as a long-distance highway. From Salina north through Nebraska, the US 81 corridor was not part of the Interstate Highway System, but I-29 began at Kansas City, gradually heading northwest and intersecting US 81 at Watertown, South Dakota, then following it north to the Canadian border. The portion through northern Kansas and Nebraska remains an important regional corridor and was proposed as a potential Interstate in the 1960s, but by the late 1970s, the rest had been mostly replaced by I-35 and I-29 for non-local traffic. The American Association of State Highway and Transportation Officials approved a truncation in 1991, changing the southern terminus from Laredo to north of Fort Worth and removing long overlaps with and short sections parallel to I-35.

The portion of US 81 between Grandview, Texas, and Hillsboro, Texas, that was not part of I-35W was renamed SH 81.

Business US 81 in San Antonio was replaced by Loop 368 and Loop 353. The north side (Loop 368) traveled down Broadway and Austin Highway while the south side (Loop 353) was Nogalitos and Laredo Highway. When it was replaced, they renamed the street New Laredo Highway.

Old portions of US 81 in various parts of North Dakota are now county roads. The current US 81 in these areas is cosigned with I-29.

Completion of the four-lane section of US 81 between Salina and Minneapolis, Kansas, occurred in 1971.

Between Wichita and Salina, Kansas, old sections of US 81 are now county roads and short sections of state highways. The current US 81 in this area is cosigned with I-135. In McPherson County, the old alignment of US 81 is signed as Business US 81.

== Major intersections ==
Texas
I-35W / US 287 in Fort Worth. US 81/US 287 travels concurrently to Bowie.
US 380 in Decatur
US 82 in Ringgold
Oklahoma
US 70 in Waurika
US 277 in Ninnekah. The highways travel concurrently to Chickasha.
I-44 in Chickasha
US 62 / US 277 in Chickasha. US 62/US 81 travels concurrently through Chickasha.
I-40 in El Reno
US 60 / US 412 in Enid. US 60/US 81 travels concurrently to Pond Creek.
US 64 in Enid. The highways travel concurrently to west of Pond Creek.
Kansas
US 177 in South Haven
US 166 north of South Haven
US 160 in Wellington. The highways travel concurrently through Wellington.
I-135 in Wichita. The highways travel concurrently to northwest of Salina.
I-235 in Wichita
US 54 / US 400 in Wichita
I-235 in Wichita
US 50 in Newton. The highways travel concurrently to northeast of Newton.
US 56 in McPherson
I-70 / I-135 / US 40 northwest of Salina
US 24 south of Concordia
US 36 in Belleville
Nebraska
US 136 south-southeast of Hebron
US 6 in Fairmont
I-80 in York
US 34 in York. The highways travel concurrently to north of York.
US 30 south of Columbus. The highways travel concurrently to Columbus.
US 275 in Norfolk
US 20 southeast of McLean
South Dakota
US 18 south of Freeman
I-90 south of Salem
US 14 south of Arlington. The highways travel concurrently to Arlington.
US 212 in Watertown
I-29 northeast of Watertown. The highways travel concurrently to east of Manvel, North Dakota.
US 12 northwest of Summit
North Dakota
I-94 / US 52 in Fargo
US 10 in Fargo
US 2 in Grand Forks
I-29 south-southwest of Joliette. The highways travel concurrently to the Canada–United States border north of Pembina.
I-29/ PTH 75 at the Canada–United States border north of Pembina

== See also ==
Though it did in the past, US 81 currently does not connect to either of its spur routes.

- U.S. Highway 181
- U.S. Highway 281
- Special routes of U.S. Route 81

Browse numbered routes
← I-80	NE	→ US 83
← SD 79	SD	→ US 83
