= Meridian Highway =

- U.S. National Register of Historic Places
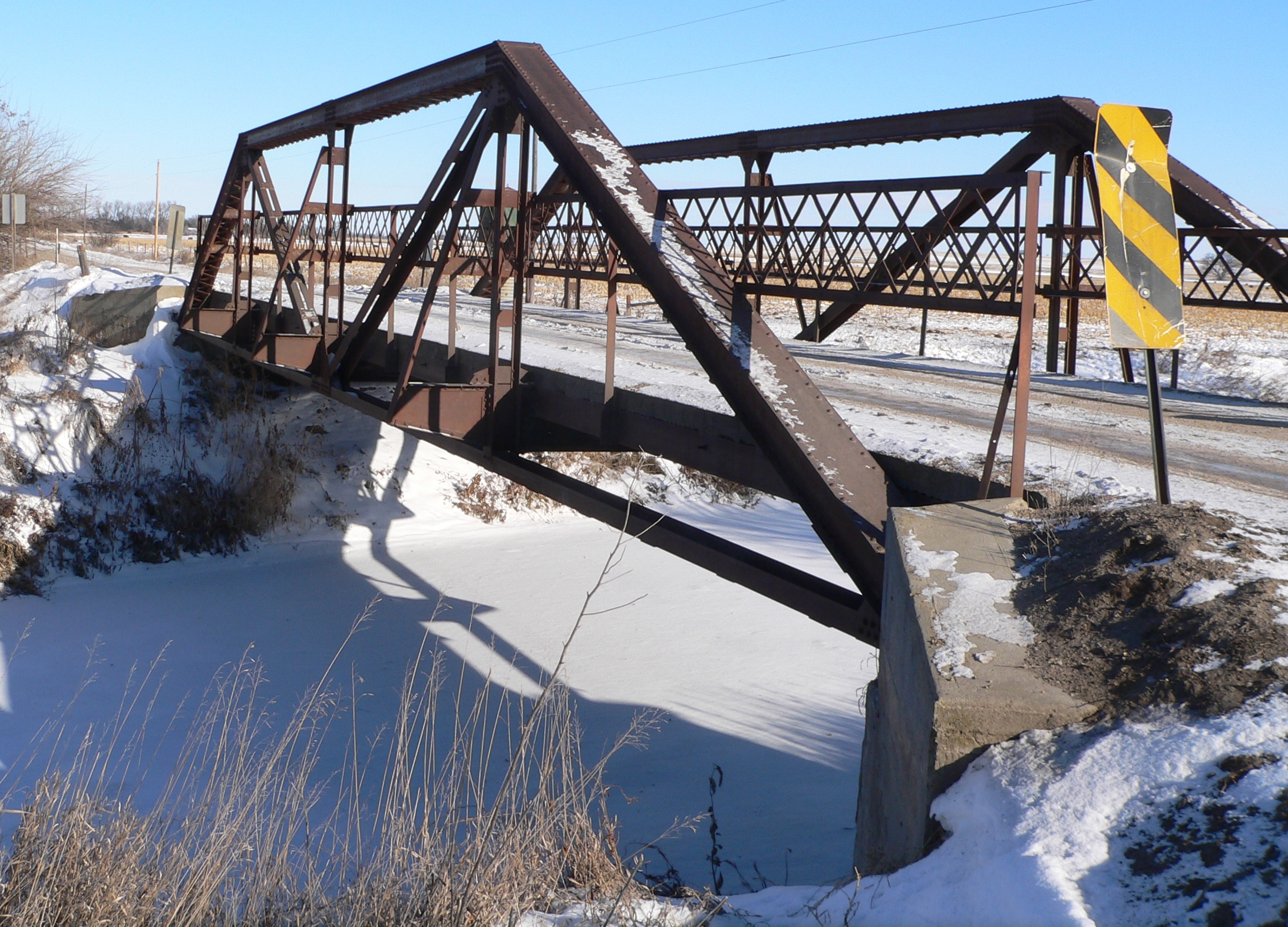
- Bridge on the Meridian Highway in Pierce County, Nebraska; seen from the southwest

- Location within Nebraska Location within the United States
- Nearest city: Pierce, Nebraska
- Coordinates: 42.1775°N 97.48484°W
- Area: 36 acres (15 ha)
- Built: 1911
- NRHP reference No.: 01001273
- Added to NRHP: November 29, 2001

Meridian Highway was a United States auto trail in the early twentieth century. It roughly followed the path of present-day U.S. Route 81 from Pembina, North Dakota to Fort Worth, Texas, and Interstate 35 from Fort Worth to Laredo, Texas.

== History ==
A group in Kansas was formed in 1911 to promote the concept of a direct north-south automobile route through the central United States. To further that goal, the objective was to organize similar groups in other states. Meridian Road groups, including in Nebraska and Canada were started in 1911. The International Meridian Road Association was founded in 1912, representing Canada, North and South Dakota, Nebraska, Kansas, Oklahoma, and Texas. Unlike most auto trails, the Meridian Highway was envisioned as an international highway, running from Winnipeg to Mexico City. Its namesake was the Sixth Principal Meridian (approximately the 97th meridian west). The original route through Nebraska was approximately 200 miles long, by 1928, only 19 miles of the Nebraska portion remained dirt road. Improved roads in Nebraska at the time were typically sand and gravel.

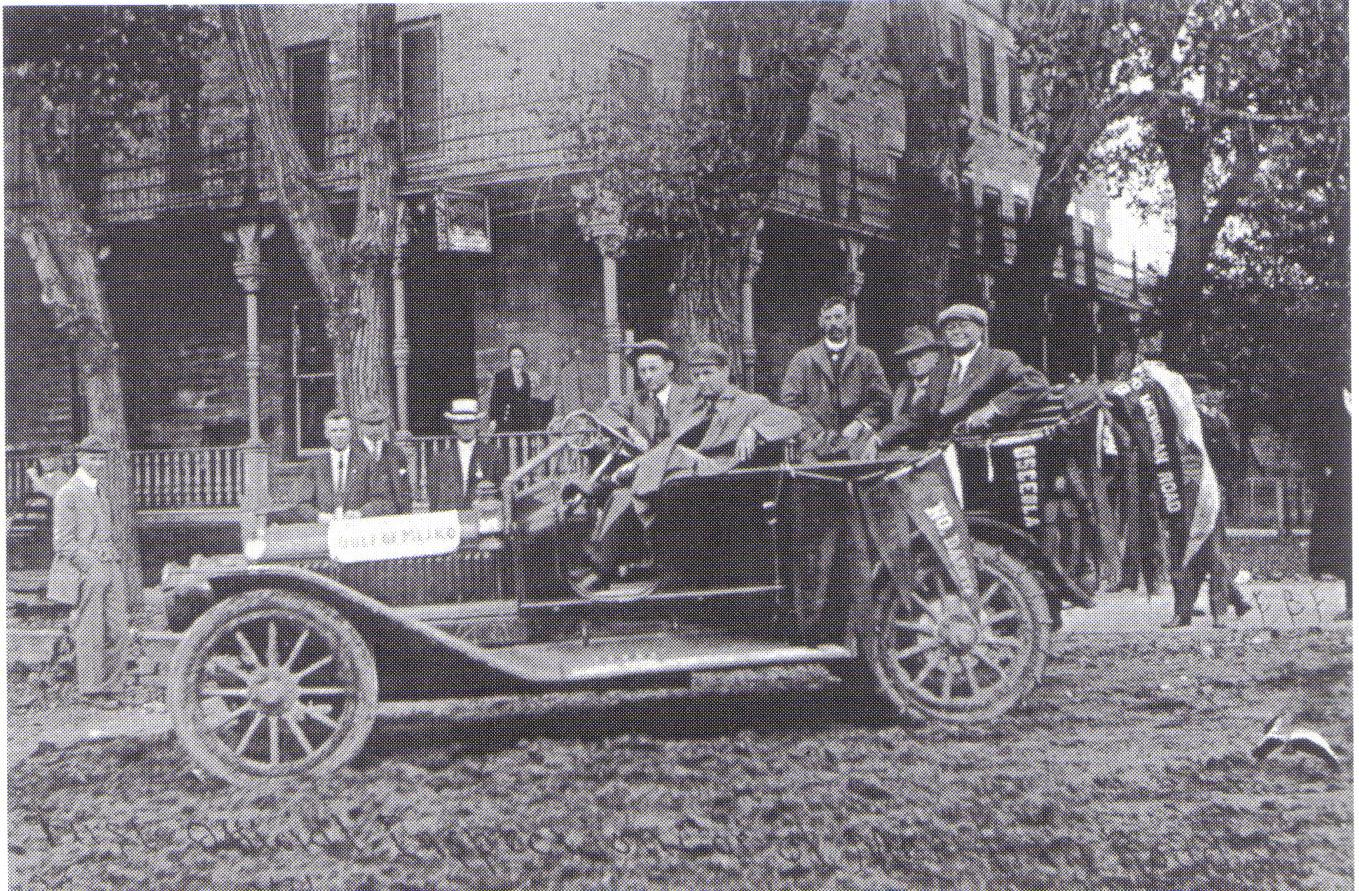
1912 Meridian Highway inspection team in Concordia, Kansas

A 4.5 mile segment of the road was added to the National Register of Historic Places in 2001, all of it in rural Pierce County, Nebraska. The portion of the Meridian Road in Pierce County was still a gravel surface country road in 2001.
