= United States Customs House and Post Office – Pembina =

- United States Customs House and Post Office-Pembina
- U.S. National Register of Historic Places
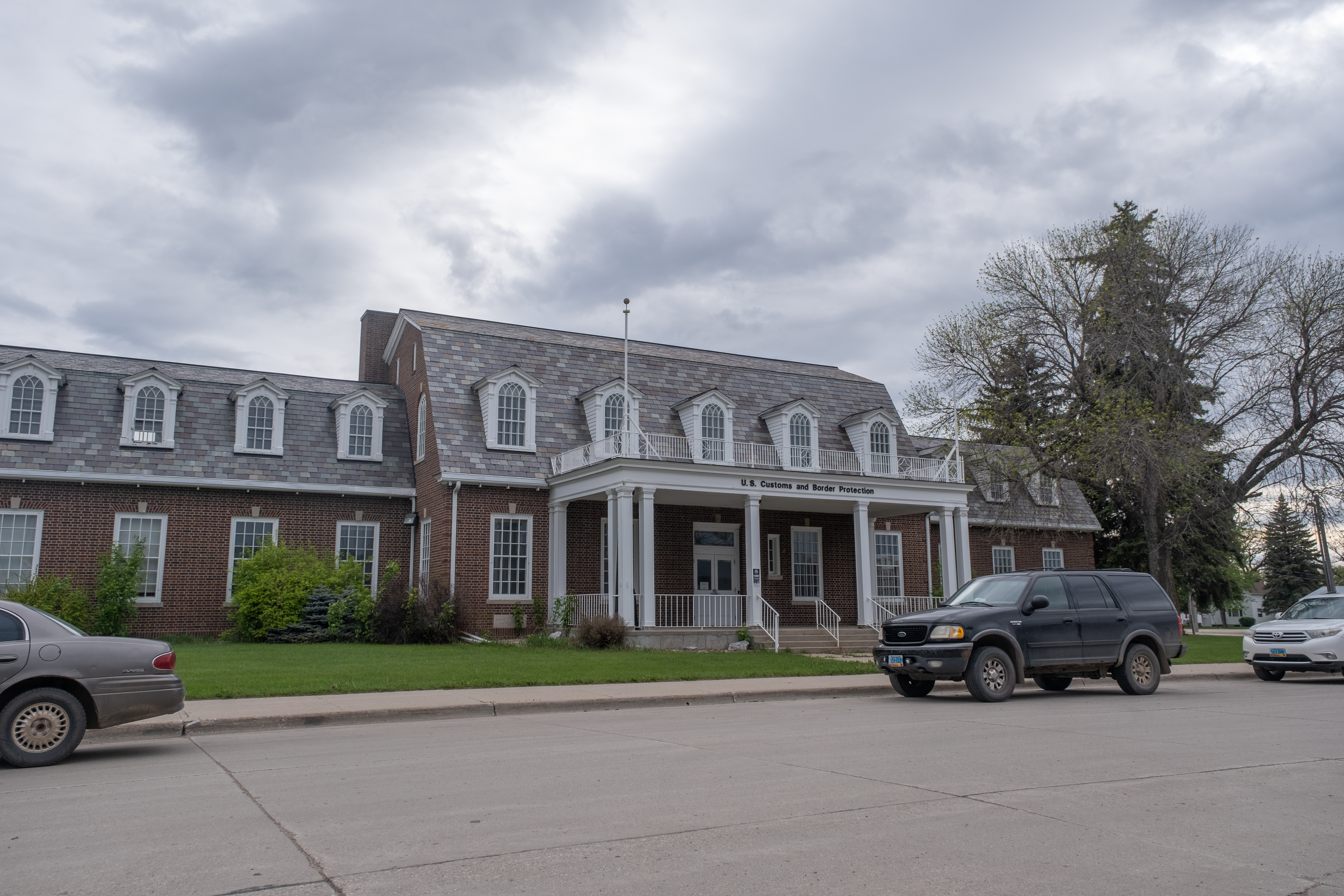

- Location within North Dakota Location within the United States
- Location: 125 S. Cavalier St., Pembina, North Dakota
- Coordinates: 48°57′59″N 97°14′39″W
- Area: less than one acre
- Built: 1932
- Architect: Office of the Supervising Architect under James A. Wetmore.
- Architectural style: Colonial Revival
- MPS: US Post Offices in North Dakota, 1900--1940 MPS
- NRHP reference No.: 89001755
- Added to NRHP: November 1, 1989

The United States Customs House and Post Office-Pembina was built in 1932. It was designed by the Office of the Supervising Architect under James A. Wetmore. It was listed on the National Register of Historic Places in 1989.
