= Manitoba Highway 29 =

Highway in Manitoba, Canada

Provincial Trunk Highway 29

Route information
- Auxiliary route of PTH 75
- Maintained by Department of Infrastructure
- Length: 0.5 km (0.31 mi; 1,600 ft)

Major junctions
- South end: I-29 / US 81 (Pembina–Emerson Border Crossing)
- North end: PTH 75 at Emerson

Location
- Country: Canada
- Province: Manitoba
- Towns: Emerson

Highway system
- Provincial highways in Manitoba; Winnipeg City Routes
← PTH 27	→ PTH 30

Provincial Trunk Highway 29 (PTH 29) was a short provincial highway in the Canadian province of Manitoba. The highway was an at-grade expressway with a length of 0.5 kilometres (0.31 miles) and located within the former Town of Emerson. It served as a connecting route between PTH 75 and Interstate 29 (I-29) at the Pembina–Emerson Border Crossing on the United States border.

== History ==
PTH 29 became a spur route of PTH 75 when its junction with PTH 75 at Emerson was reconstructed in 1985 to direct through traffic from the north to PTH 29 instead of PTH 75 south to the nearby Noyes–Emerson East Border Crossing and US Highway 75 (US 75). Prior to this, those wishing to travel I-29 were required to turn onto the connecting road north of the border. After the Noyes and Emerson East border stations were permanently closed in the mid 2000s, the highway alignment remained unchanged until the Manitoba government formally eliminated PTH 29 and moved PTH 75's southern terminus to the Pembina–Emerson border crossing in 2012.
