= March West =

1874 journey of the North-West Mounted Police across Canada

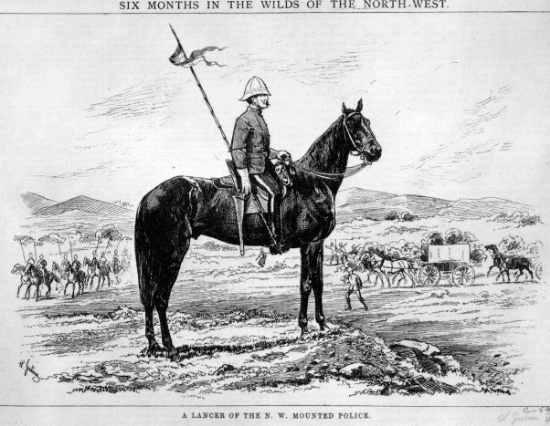
Mounted policeman in 1874, depicted by Henri Julien

The March West was the initial journey of the North-West Mounted Police (NWMP) to the Canadian prairies, made between July 8 and October 9, 1874.

It was the result of the force being deployed to what is now southern Alberta in response to the Cypress Hills Massacre and subsequent fears of a US military intervention. Their ill-planned and arduous journey of nearly 1,400 kilometres (900 mi) became known as the "March West" and was later portrayed by the force as an epic journey of endurance.

== Background ==
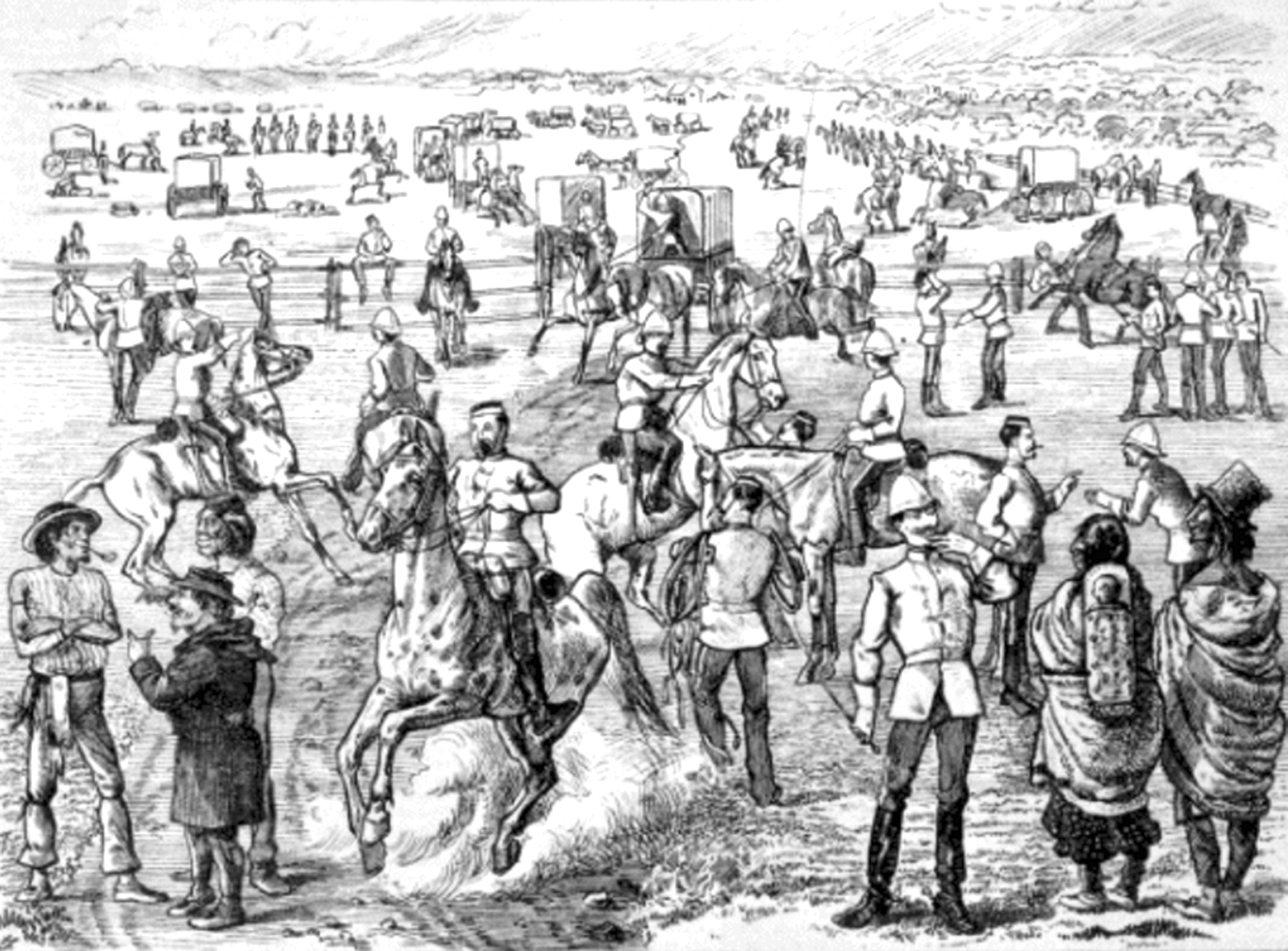
Mounted police preparing to leave Fort Dufferin in 1874, depicted by Henri Julien

Sir John A. Macdonald obtained approval for his new force on May 23, 1873, after the Parliament passed the Mounted Police Act into law with little debate and no opposition. At this point, Macdonald appears to have intended to create a force of mounted police to watch "the frontier from Manitoba to the foot of the Rocky Mountains", probably with its headquarters in Winnipeg. He was heavily influenced by the model of the Royal Irish Constabulary, which combined aspects of a traditional military unit with the judicial functions of the magistrates' courts, and believed that the new force should be able to provide a local system of government in otherwise ungoverned areas. Macdonald had originally also wanted to form units of Métis policemen, commanded by white Canadian officers in a similar manner to the British Indian Army, but he was forced to abandon this approach after the Red River Rebellion of 1870 called their loyalty into question.

In June 1873, around 30 Assiniboines were killed in the Cypress Hills Massacre, creating a national furore. In response, Macdonald used a privy council Order-in-Council to implement the new legislation, formally creating the NWMP with the intention of mobilizing the force and deploying it early the next year. A report then arrived from Alexander Morris, the Lieutenant Governor of the North-West Territories, blaming the massacre on the activities of whisky traders at Fort Whoop-Up; Morris predicted that if action was not taken immediately, there would be a major uprising by the First Nations across the region, into which the United States might choose to intervene. Macdonald was not entirely convinced by the governor's analysis, but nonetheless he agreed to recruit 150 men and send them west to Lower Fort Garry before winter weather blocked the route.

Macdonald's Conservative government then fell from power over the Pacific Scandal and was replaced on November 7, 1873, by the Liberal administration of Alexander Mackenzie, who placed more credence on Morris's reports and had his own moral concerns about the whisky trade. These worries were amplified by calls from Washington for Ottawa to secure the frontier and so prevent American Indians from purchasing whisky in Canada. Mackenzie initially suggested sending a joint Canadian-United States military expedition, but, after Governor General Lord Dufferin and others noted the serious implications of inviting the US Army to deploy into Canadian territory, he instead agreed to deploy the new mounted police to carry out the operation. Another 150 men were recruited in eastern Canada and sent west by railway and river boat through the United States to rendezvous with the first part of the force at Fort Dufferin.

== Deployment ==
The force was given orders to proceed to Fort Edmonton in order to resolve problems around Fort Whoop-Up, before then dispersing to various posts stretching westwards across the territories. From Fort Dufferin, one option was to trace the southern line of the frontier, following a well-established trail created two years before by the British and United States Boundary Commission. Morris disagreed with this approach, arguing that it might encourage an attack by the Sioux, and encouraged the NWMP to take a more northerly route. Colonel George French finally agreed with Morris that the expedition would initially follow the trail but would then steer away from the border and Sioux territory.

== The march ==
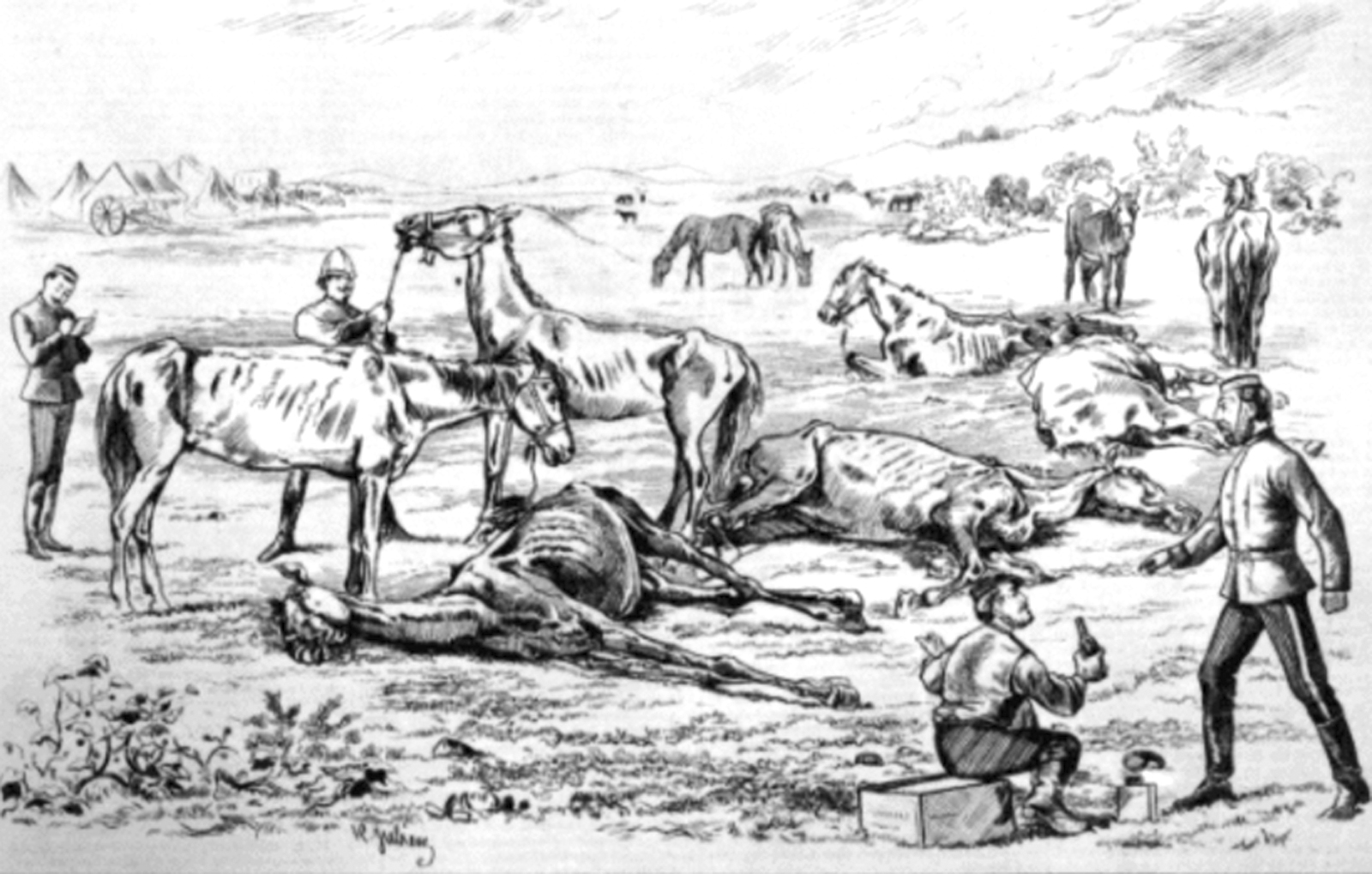
The police in Dead Horse Valley in 1874, depicted by Henri Julien

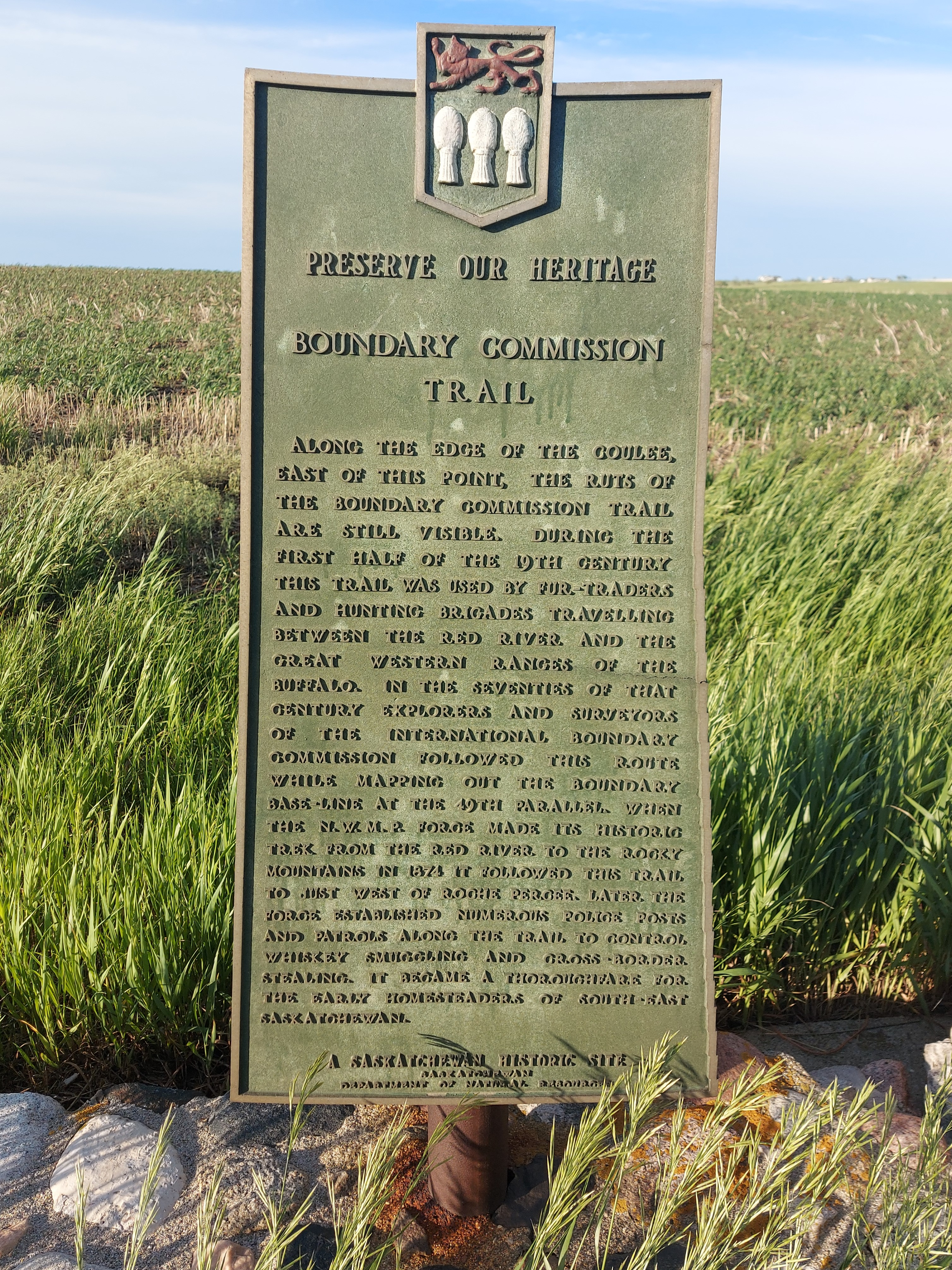
Boundary Commission Trail plaque that also commemorates the route taken by the NWMP near Roche Percee, Saskatchewan

The NWMP finally left Fort Dufferin on July 8, 1874. The 275-strong expedition was divided into six divisions, labelled A to F, supported by 310 horses, 143 draught oxen, and 187 Red River carts and wagons, stretching out at least 2.4 kilometres (1.5 mi) along the track. The force took two field guns and two mortars for protection, cattle to use as food, and mowing machines for making hay. George Arthur French had negotiated with the Canadian Illustrated News that the expedition be accompanied by Henri Julien, a journalist who the commissioner hoped would write a positive account of the new force. The teams made only 24 kilometres (15 mi) a day at most, travelling under unpleasant and arduous conditions, made more difficult by the NWMP teamsters having little experience and the horses being unsuitable for draught work. On July 29, the badly depleted A Division, including those men suffering from dysentery, was left behind as the main force turned off the southerly trail to travel across the much drier and rougher plains a bit to the north.

On August 1, the so-called Second Patrol split off of the main body of Mounties to go northwest to Edmonton. Superintendent W.D. Jarvis, Inspector Gagnon and 20 men escorted 60 horses and 160 cows, calves and oxen to Edmonton. They followed the north bank of the North Saskatchewan River. Horses were so exhausted they were standing only with the help of the policemen. By then it was October so snow and sleet often drenched the men and animals. Many horses and cows had to be left behind or died on the journey. By October 28, Horse Hills (in present-day northeast Edmonton) was reached, but the weather was freezing cold and the horses were stiff and suffered terribly on the iron-hard trail. One wagon made it into Edmonton that same day and sent back barley to give the remaining horses strength, but it was four days before the last of the trekkers made it into Edmonton.

The trip was just as rough for the main body, proceeding across the southern Canadian prairies. Food began to run out and, due to the expedition having failed to bring any water bottles, the men had no option but to drink contaminated local water. Another detachment of the sicker men and livestock was left behind at Old Wives Lake. On August 24 the expedition reached the Cypress Hills, where the weather turned wet and cold, and the expedition's horses began to die.

French had thought Fort Whoop-Up would be found at the junction of the Bow and Oldman rivers, where the South Saskatchewan River begins, but when they arrived on 10 September there was nothing there, as the fort was in fact about 75 miles (120 kilometres) away. The NWMP had expected the area to contain good grazing for their horses but it was barren and treeless. French described it as "little better than a desert" and his men were reduced to drinking muddy water gathered from marshland. Having sent out search parties with no success, the expedition now faced the total loss of their horses and imminent starvation.

French abandoned the plan to move further towards Whoop-Up and instead travelled 70 miles (110 kilometres) south towards the Sweet Grass Hills, close to the border, where supplies could be bought from suppliers in the United States. Yet more horses died from the cold and hunger and many of the men were barefoot and in rags when they arrived, having travelled a total of nearly 1,400 kilometres (900 mi).

After resupplying, French sent divisions D and E back east, before taking B, C and F to travel to Fort Whoop-Up in October 1874.

The expedition had been badly planned and executed, and almost failed. One historian described it as "a monumental fiasco of poor planning, ignorance, incompetence, and cruelty to men and beasts".

== Conclusion ==
When the police arrived at Fort Whoop-Up on October 9, they were prepared for a battle, but the whisky traders were aware that they were coming and had long since moved on. The NWMP had received new orders from Ottawa to garrison the area and settled down to build Fort Macleod on an island in Oldman River.

== Legacy ==
Early historians of the force stressed the epic nature of the expedition. The popular historian Arthur Haydon, for example, scorned the newspaper accounts, which blamed the officers and men as "incapable", "inexperienced" and "careless", arguing that the march was "truly one of the most extraordinary on record", of which "all Canadians might well feel proud. By 1955, however, the historian Paul Sharp had suggested that the March West almost failed due to "misinformation, inexperience and ignorance", and criticism of the force's performance intensified after 1973. Ronald Atkin concluded that the expedition was "epic in its lack of organisation, in the poor way in which it was conducted and its incredibly close brush with disaster". Daniel Francis condemned it as "a fiasco of bad planning", with R. C. Macleod observing that "the difficulties of the Long March...were largely self-inflicted". Nonetheless, it rapidly became portrayed by the force as an epic story of bravery, endurance and determination.

== Bibliography ==
- Atkin, Ronald (1973). Maintain the Right: The Early History of the North West Mounted Police, 1873–1900. London and Basingstoke: Macmillan. ISBN 978-0333122822.
- Baker, William (1998). "Twenty-five Years After: Mounted Police Historiography Since the 1973–74 Centennial of the Force". In Baker, William (ed.). The Mounted Police and Prairie Society, 1873–1919. Regina: Canadian Plains Research Centre, University of Regina. pp. vii–xvi. ISBN 0889771030.
- Francis, Daniel (1997). National Dreams: Myth, Memory, and Canadian History. Vancouver: Arsenal Pulp Press. ISBN 1551520435.
- Haydon, Arthur L. (1926) [1910]. The Riders of the Plains: A Record of the Royal North-West Mounted Police of Canada (6th ed.). London and New York: Andrew Melrose. OCLC 25798772.
- Horrall, Stanley W. (1973). The Pictorial History of the Royal Canadian Mounted Police. Toronto: McGraw-Hill Ryerson. ISBN 978-0070773660.
- Horrall, Stanley W. (1974). "The March West". In Dempsey, Hugh A. (ed.). Men in Scarlet. Lincoln, Nebraska: Historical Society of Alberta and McClelland and Stewart West. pp. 13–26. OCLC 635848375.
- Macleod, R. C. (1976). The North-West Mounted Police and Law Enforcement, 1873–1905. Toronto and Buffalo, NY: University of Toronto Press. ISBN 0802053335.
- Stanley, George F. G. (1974). "The Man Who Sketched the Great March". In Dempsey, Hugh A. (ed.). Men in Scarlet. Lincoln, Nebraska: Historical Society of Alberta and McClelland and Stewart West. pp. 27–49. OCLC 635848375.
