= Fort Dufferin =

Historical site in Manitoba, Canada

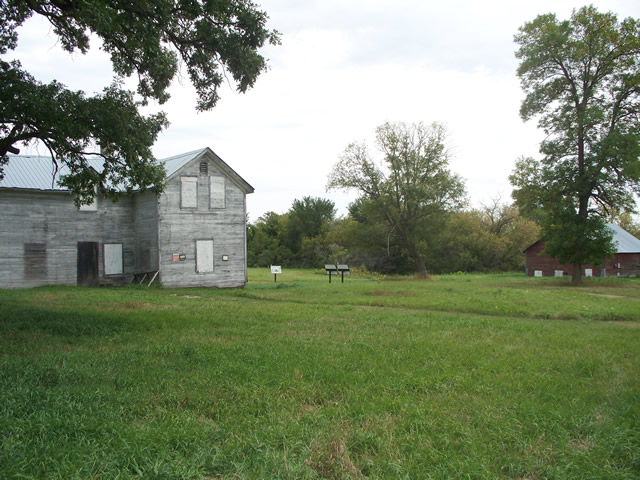
- Fort Dufferin site with remaining buildings
- Interactive map of Fort Dufferin
- Etymology: Frederick Hamilton-Temple-Blackwood, 1st Marquess of Dufferin and Ava
- Location: Manitoba, Canada
- Coordinates: 49°01′50″N 97°12′08″W
- Founder: Government of Canada
- Built: 1872 (used until 1879)

National Historic Site of Canada
- Designated: 1937

Fort Dufferin is a former Canadian government post near the Canada–United States border at Emerson, Manitoba. The fort was used during the 1870s as a base for the North American Boundary Commission and the North-West Mounted Police (NWMP), and as an immigration station. It was designated a national historic site of Canada in 1937.

== History ==
Fort Dufferin was constructed in 1872 on a site along the west bank of the Red River three kilometres north of the present-day border station at Emerson. Named for Governor General Lord Dufferin, it was originally used as a base for the Canadian-British contingent of the North American Boundary Commission, which was tasked with surveying the international border along the 49th parallel north, as agreed upon by the British and American governments in the Treaty of 1818.

After the commission's surveyors moved west along the Boundary Commission Trail, the fort was used by the NWMP as an assembly point prior to their March West in 1874. Members of the force arrived at Fort Dufferin, coming from the east through the United States, marking the only time the entire force was ever assembled at one place. On July 8, 1874, the NWMP moved out and began their journey west to bring law and order to the North-West Territories. The NWMP also used Fort Dufferin as its Manitoba headquarters, before moving it to Winnipeg in 1875.

From 1875 to 1879, the Canadian government used Fort Dufferin as an immigration station for steamboats entering the country along the Red River, including thousands of Russian Mennonites of the West Reserve, and as a quarantine station for livestock. Following completion of the international rail line on the east side of the river in 1878, steamboat traffic on the river ceased and the immigration station at Fort Dufferin was no longer needed. In 1879, the fort was abandoned and the Canadian government sold the property.

== Historical Site ==
Fort Dufferin was designated a National Historic Site in 1937 and is open to the public during the summer. A cairn and plaque mark the historic site and some of the buildings, though badly deteriorated, still stand. Ongoing preservation efforts are being carried out by several groups, including local residents, the Canadian government, and the Royal Canadian Mounted Police Veteran's Association.

== See also ==
- Boundary Commission Trail
- Pembina–Emerson Border Crossing
