= Hickson, North Dakota =

Community in North Dakota, US

- Unincorporated community
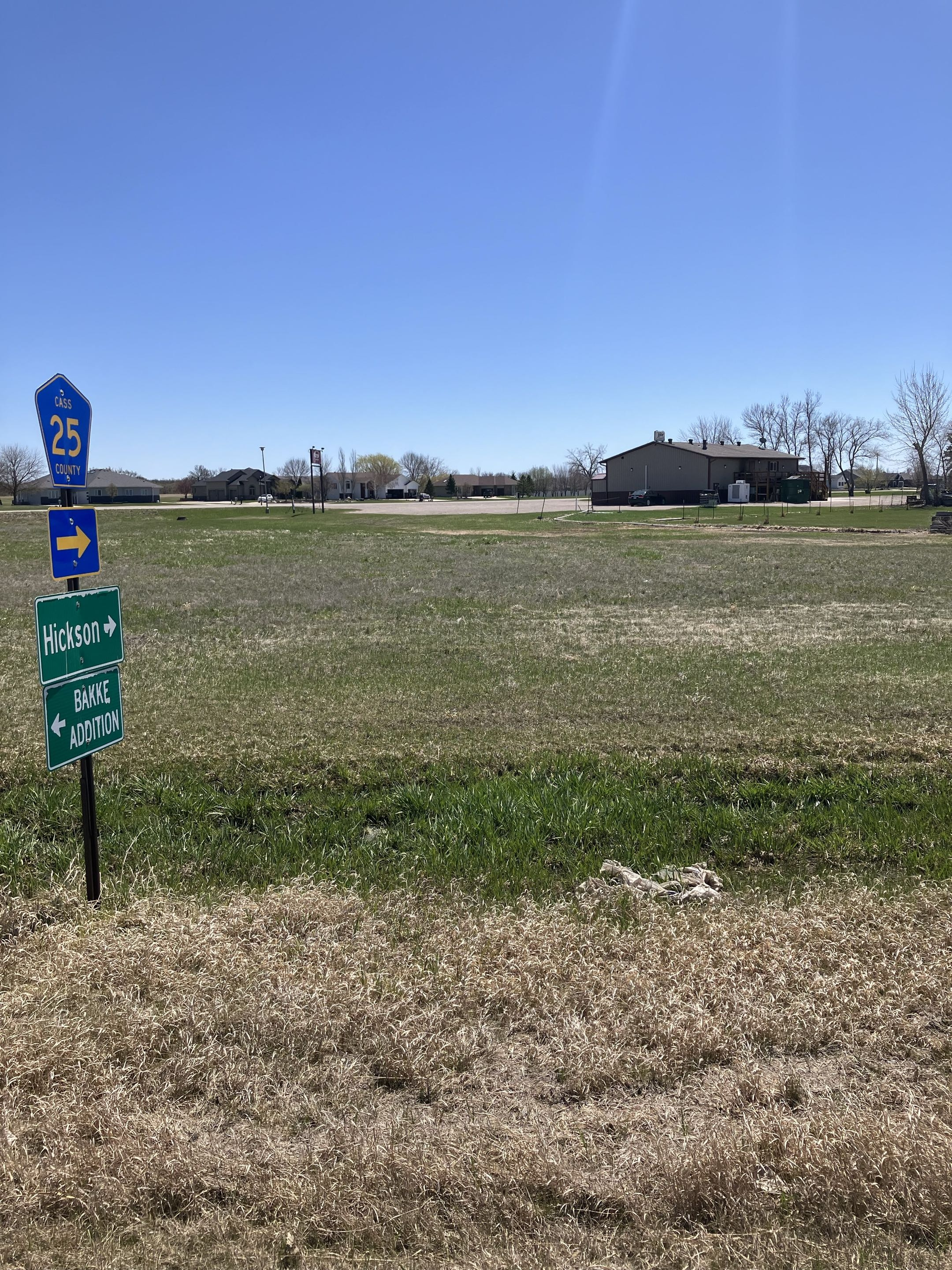

- Location within North Dakota Location within the United States
- Country: United States
- State: North Dakota
- County: Cass
- Township: Pleasant
- Platted: 1883
- Elevation: 919 ft (280 m)
- Time zone: UTC-6 (Central (CST))
  - Summer (DST): UTC-5 (CDT)
- ZIP code: 58047 (Horace)
- Area code: 701
- GNIS feature ID: 1029426

Hickson is an unincorporated community in Pleasant Township, Cass County, in the U.S. state of North Dakota. It is enclaved within, but not a part of the city of Oxbow.

== History ==
Hickson was laid out in 1883 when the railroad was extended to that point. A post office called Hickson was established in 1884 and remained in operation until 1975. The community was named for Ole Hicks, a pioneer settler.

=== Railroad ===
The Fargo and Southern railroad laid the tracks that passed through Hickson and ran its first train in 1884. The railroad was short-lived, however and sold to the Chicago, Milwaukee, and St. Paul (CM&SP) Railroad (later known as the Milwaukee Road).

On October 31, 1956, all passenger service was stopped, and it continued as a freight line until December 1961 when the line was essentially abandoned as the Milwaukee Railroad modernized their office and freight operations.

The depot was moved to the Western Minnesota Steam Threshers Reunion grounds and museum in Hawley, MN and is the basis for a model railroad kit from Monroe Models.
