= Stanley Township, Cass County, North Dakota =

Township in North Dakota, US

Stanley Township, North Dakota
- Township
- Location within North Dakota
- Coordinates: 46°45′38″N 96°51′04″W
- Country: United States
- State: North Dakota
- County: Cass

Area
  - Total: 23.95 sq mi (62.02 km^{2})
  - Land: 23.95 sq mi (62.02 km^{2})
  - Water: 0 sq mi (0.00 km^{2})
- Elevation: 909 ft (277 m)

Population (2020)
  - Total: 931
  - Density: 38.9/sq mi (15.0/km^{2})
- Time zone: UTC-6 (Central (CST))
  - Summer (DST): UTC-5 (CDT)
- Area code: 701
- FIPS code: 38-75340
- GNIS feature ID: 1036358

Stanley Township is a township in Cass County, North Dakota, United States. The population was 931 at the 2020 census.

The unincorporated community of Wild Rice is located in Stanley Township.

== Geography ==
Stanley Township has a total area of 23.95 square miles (62.0 km^{2}), all land.

As a result of annexation from neighboring cities, Stanley Township's landmass is noncontiguous and has exclaves.

== Demographics ==
As of the 2023 American Community Survey, there were an estimated 178 total households.
