= Joliette, North Dakota =

Unincorporated community in North Dakota, U.S.

Coordinates: 48°49′05″N 97°13′39″W

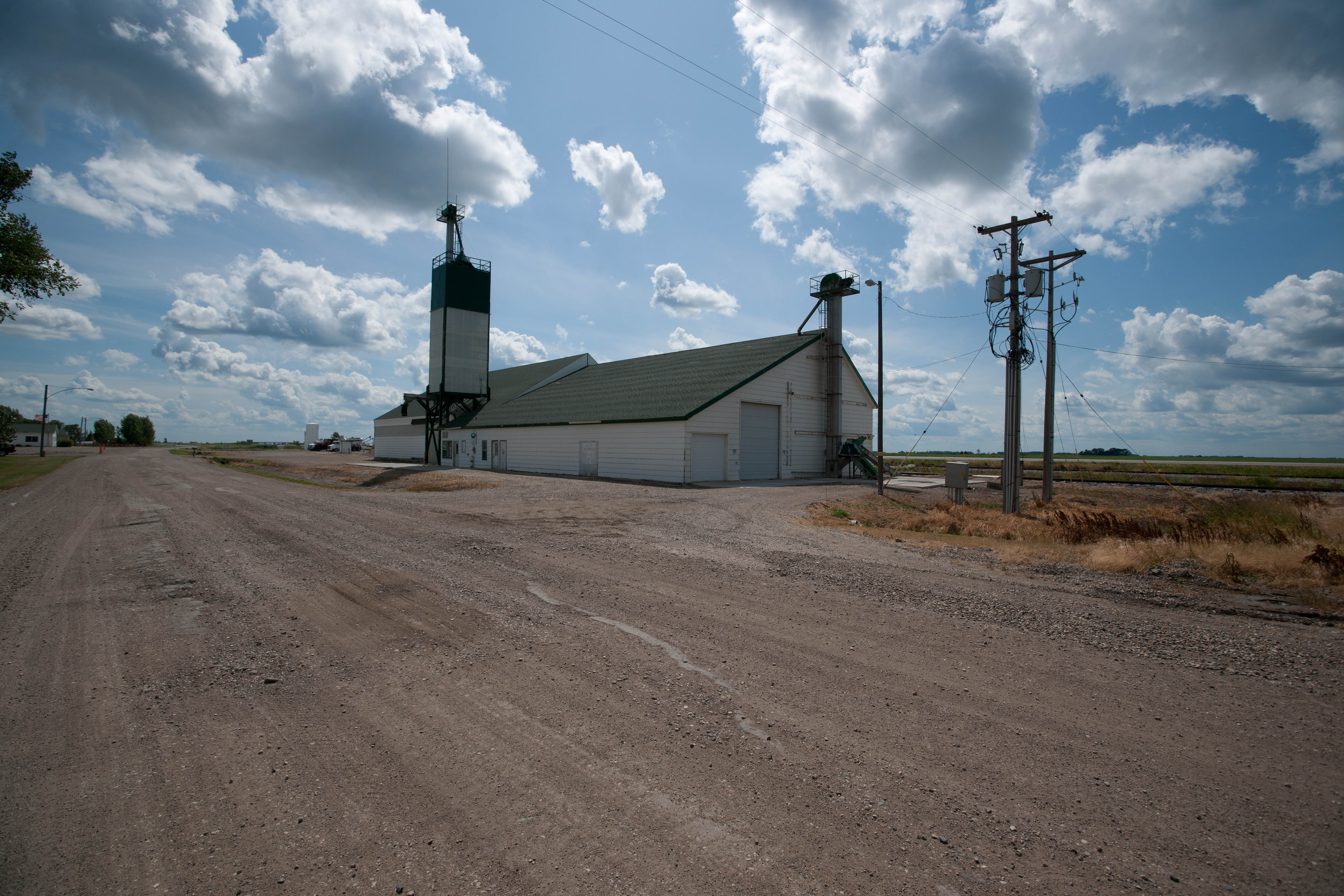
Buildings in Joliette

Joliette is an unincorporated community located along Interstate 29 in Joliette Township in Pembina County in the U.S. state of North Dakota. It was established in 1879 as a rural post office. It was settled by French Canadians and named for Joliette, Quebec, the hometown of the town's first settler. the post office is no longer operating and shares the ZIP code 58271 with the city of Pembina.

Local agribusinesses are served by a BNSF rail line that extends from Grand Forks; however, this line has been abandoned north of Joliette since 1980.
