= Wild Rice, North Dakota =

Community in North Dakota, US

- Unincorporated community
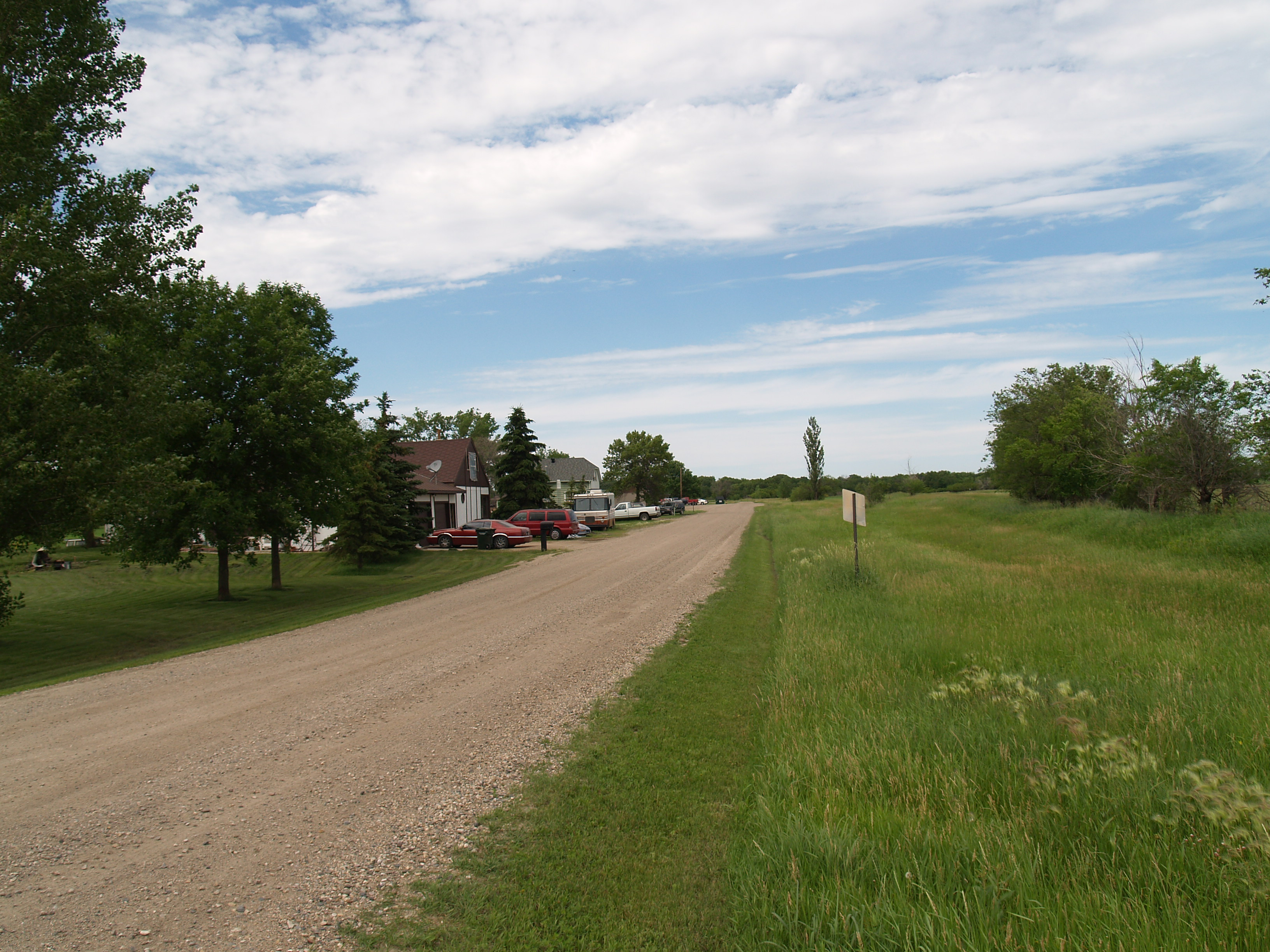
- Looking north at Wild Rice

- Location within North Dakota Location within the United States
- Coordinates: 46°44′47″N 96°48′34″W
- Country: United States
- State: North Dakota
- County: Cass
- Township: Stanley
- Founded: 1884
- Elevation: 909 ft (277 m)
- Time zone: UTC-6 (Central (CST))
  - Summer (DST): UTC-5 (CDT)
- ZIP code: 58047 (Horace)
- Area code: 701
- GNIS feature ID: 1032805

Wild Rice is an unincorporated community in Stanley Township, Cass County, North Dakota, United States. Wild Rice is located near the Wild Rice River, 9 miles (14 km) south of downtown Fargo and 5.4 miles east of Horace.

== History ==
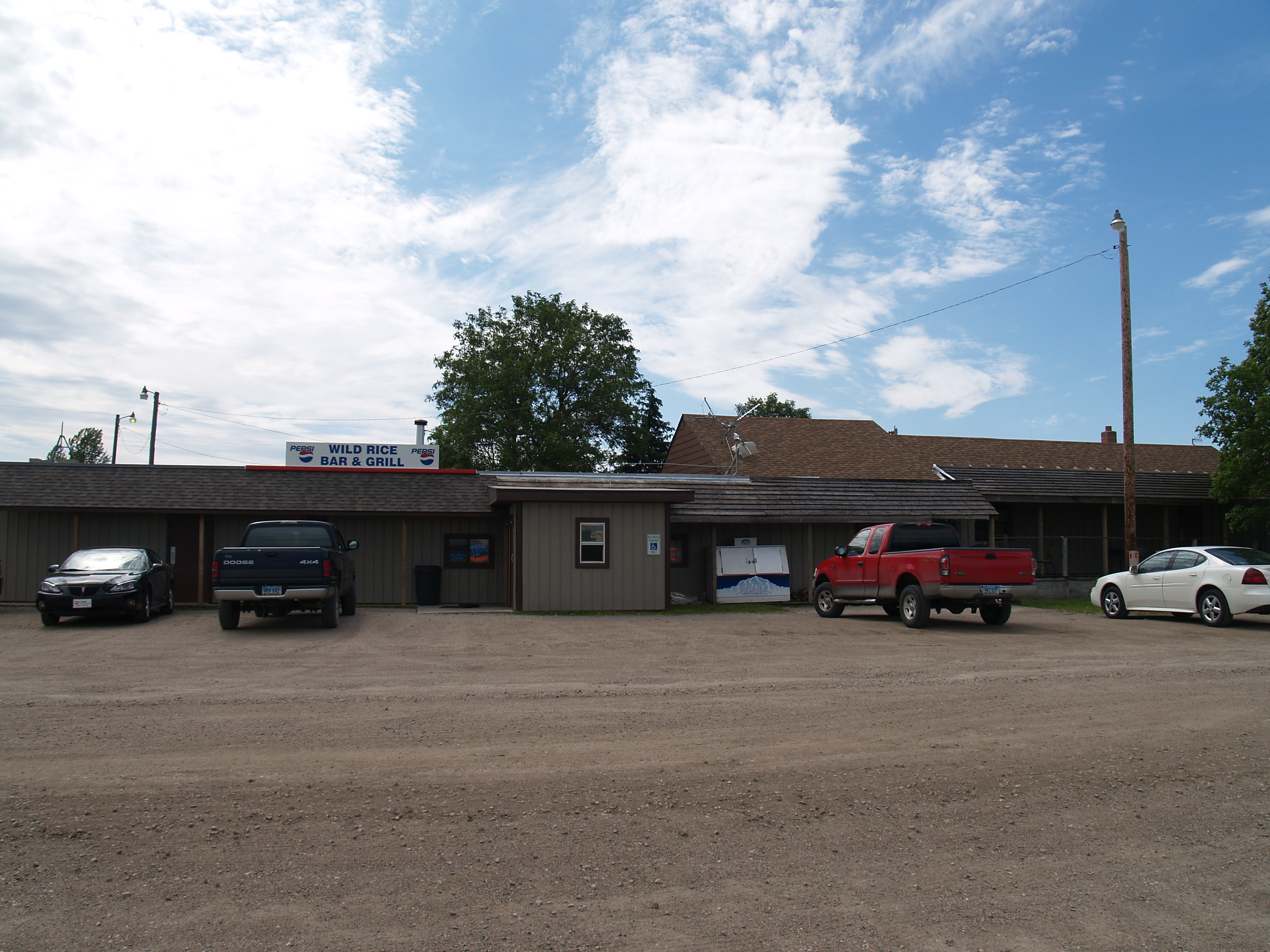
Wild Rice Bar & Grill

Wild Rice was platted in 1884 when the railroad was extended to that point. A post office called Wild Rice was established in 1884, and remained in operation until 1970. The community was originally built up chiefly by French Canadians.

=== St Benedict Catholic Church ===
The present St. Benedict's Church was constructed in 1913. St. Benedict’s Cemetery has been the final resting place for Catholics since the 1880s with over 600 people interred.
