= St. Thomas, North Dakota =

- City
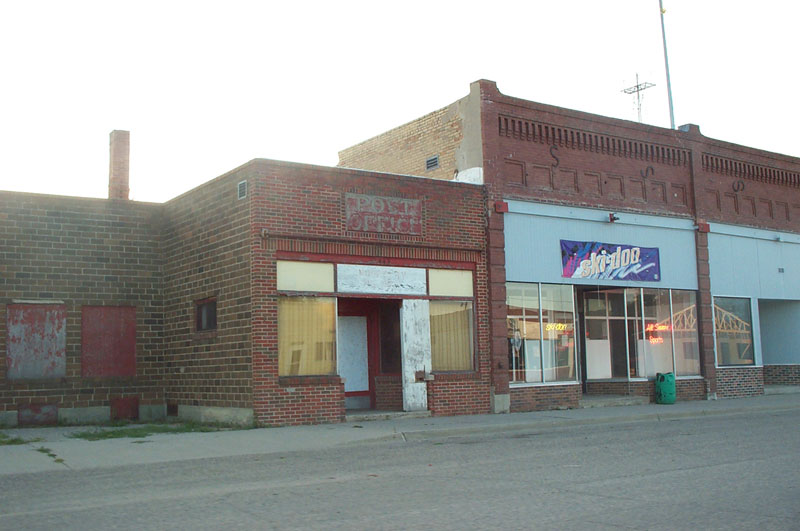
- St. Thomas, North Dakota
- Motto: "Quality Rural Living"
- Location of St. Thomas, North Dakota

- Location in the United States
- Coordinates: 48°37′11″N 97°26′50″W
- Country: United States
- State: North Dakota
- County: Pembina
- Founded: 1881

Area
  - Total: 1.02 sq mi (2.63 km^{2})
  - Land: 1.02 sq mi (2.63 km^{2})
  - Water: 0 sq mi (0.00 km^{2})
- Elevation: 843 ft (257 m)

Population (2020)
  - Total: 323
  - Estimate (2022): 317
  - Density: 318.2/sq mi (122.85/km^{2})
- Time zone: UTC-6 (Central (CST))
  - Summer (DST): UTC-5 (CDT)
- ZIP codes: 58276
- Area code: 701
- FIPS code: 38-70260
- GNIS feature ID: 1036252
- Website: stthomasnd.govoffice3.com

St. Thomas is a city in Pembina County, North Dakota, United States. The population was 323 at the 2020 census. The city, located in the Red River Valley region is located 14 miles from the Red River.

== History ==
St. Thomas was laid out in 1881. The city was named after St. Thomas, Ontario.

A U.S. post office has been in operation at St. Thomas since 1881 and is open on weekdays.

The St. Thomas Public School was established in 1882. St. Thomas Elementary School and St. Thomas High School offered classes for pre-kindergarten through 12th grade through the 2020-21 school year. The three-person class of 2021 was the last class to graduate from St. Thomas Public School. Pre-K-12th grade students from St. Thomas now attend school in Grafton, ND (in the newly consolidated Grafton School District #18).

== Geography ==
According to the United States Census Bureau, the city has a total area of 1.06 square miles (2.75 km^{2}), all land.

== Demographics ==
Historical population
Census	Pop.	Note	%±
1890	477		—
1900	661		38.6%
1910	513		−22.4%
1920	500		−2.5%
1930	595		19.0%
1940	503		−15.5%
1950	566		12.5%
1960	660		16.6%
1970	508		−23.0%
1980	528		3.9%
1990	444		−15.9%
2000	447		0.7%
2010	331		−26.0%
2020	323		−2.4%
2022 (est.)	317		−1.9%
U.S. Decennial Census; 2020 Census

=== 2020 census ===
As of the census of 2020, 323 people were living in St. Thomas. Three-quarters of those residents were born in or near the town itself. It is a racially and ethnically diverse town, where 16% of residents are Latino, 8% are Indigenous, and most other residents are white. According to the census, every man who lives in the town owns his home, and 75% of women do too.

=== 2010 census ===
As of the census of 2010, there were 331 people, 150 households, and 107 families residing in the city. The population density was 312.3 inhabitants per square mile (120.6/km^{2}). There were 182 housing units at an average density of 171.7 per square mile (66.3/km^{2}). The racial makeup of the city was 94.6% White, 0.6% Native American, 4.5% from other races, and 0.3% from two or more races. Hispanic or Latino of any race were 19.6% of the population.

There were 150 households, of which 27.3% had children under the age of 18 living with them, 53.3% were married couples living together, 9.3% had a female householder with no husband present, 8.7% had a male householder with no wife present, and 28.7% were non-families. 27.3% of all households were made up of individuals, and 11.3% had someone living alone who was 65 years of age or older. The average household size was 2.21, and the average family size was 2.63.

The median age in the city was 46.1 years. 19.6% of residents were under the age of 18; 5.7% were between the ages of 18 and 24; 21.7% were from 25 to 44; 35.2% were from 45 to 64; and 17.8% were 65 years of age or older. The gender makeup of the city was 52.6% male and 47.4% female.

== Notable people ==
- Edward K. Thompson, editor of LIFE magazine and SMITHSONIAN magazine
