= Pembina, North Dakota =

- City
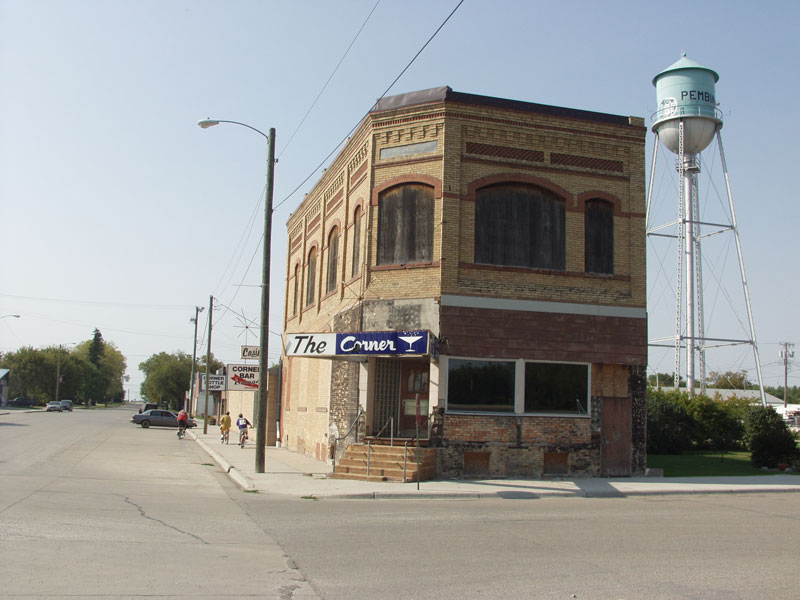
- Building and water tower in Pembina
- Motto: "Oldest Settlement in the Dakota Territories"
- Location of Pembina, North Dakota
- Coordinates: 48°58′01″N 97°14′51″W
- Country: United States
- State: North Dakota
- County: Pembina
- Founded: 1797 (Officially 1843)

Area
  - Total: 0.81 sq mi (2.11 km^{2})
  - Land: 0.81 sq mi (2.09 km^{2})
  - Water: 0.0077 sq mi (0.02 km^{2})
- Elevation: 791 ft (241 m)

Population (2020)
  - Total: 512
  - Estimate (2022): 504
  - Density: 634.6/sq mi (245.03/km^{2})
- Time zone: UTC−6 (Central (CST))
  - Summer (DST): UTC−5 (CDT)
- ZIP code: 58271
- Area code: 701
- FIPS code: 38-61580
- GNIS feature ID: 1036216
- Website: pembina.govoffice.com

Pembina (/ˈpɛmbɪnə/) is a city in Pembina County, North Dakota, United States. The population was 512 at the 2020 census. Pembina is 2 miles (3.2 km) south of the Canada–US border. Interstate 29 passes on the western side of Pembina, leading north to the Canada–US border at Emerson, Manitoba, and south to the cities of Grand Forks and Fargo. The Pembina–Emerson Border Crossing is the second busiest along the Canada–United States border west of the Great Lakes. It is one of three 24-hour ports of entry in North Dakota, the others being Portal and Dunseith. The Noyes–Emerson East Border Crossing, 2 miles (3.2 km) to the east on the Minnesota side of the Red River, also processed cross-border traffic until its closure in 2006.

The area of Pembina was long inhabited by various Indigenous peoples. At the time of 16th century French exploration and fur trading, historical Native American tribes included the Lakota (Sioux, as the French called them), the Chippewa (Ojibwe), and the Assiniboine. The British/Canadian Hudson's Bay Company (HBC) established a fur-trading post on the site of present-day Pembina in 1797, and it is the oldest European-American community in the Dakotas. The first permanent HBC-sponsored settlement in Pembina started in 1812. Prior to the Treaty of 1818, Pembina was in Rupert's Land, the HBC's trading territory. The treaty transferred the Red River Valley south of the 49th parallel to the United States, but until 1823, both the United States and the British authorities believed Pembina was north of the 49th and therefore still in Rupert's Land. That year United States Army Major Stephen H. Long's survey of the 49th parallel revealed Pembina's location to be just south of the border. Pembina was officially founded in 1843. In 1851, the US established its first post office in present-day North Dakota in Pembina. Pembina was the most populous place in North Dakota according to the 1860 census. Pembina served as county seat from 1867 to 1911, being designated as a town in 1885.

== Namesake ==
The name Pembina derives from an Ojibwe word for Viburnum edule, a bushy plant with bright red berries which grows in the area. Nineteenth-century journal-writers and observers translated the word as "summer berry" or "high cranberry".

== History ==
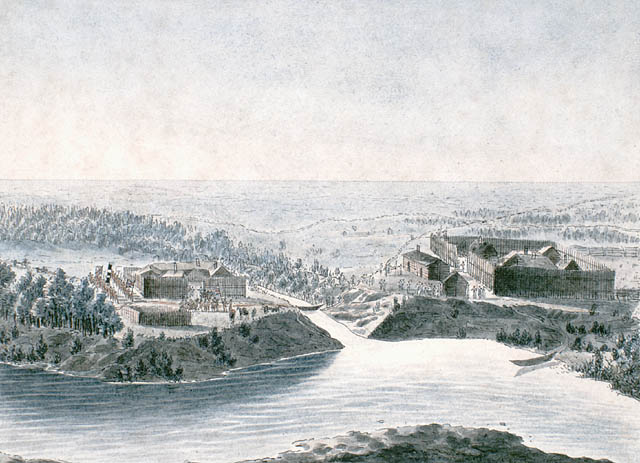
Fort Daer of the HBC and across the Pembina River on the right old Fort Pembina built by the NWC (painted by Peter Rindisbacher in 1822)

The Pembina area was historically at the borders of the territories of the Lakota, the Chippewa, and the Assiniboine, American Indian tribes, who competed for hegemony. Their conflict increased beginning with the French introduction of firearms in the late 17th century as part of their goods traded for furs. The first known European] visitors to the Pembina region were the French La Vérendrye family in the early 18th century.

Pembina's recorded history of European encounter extended for more than 200 years. Started by the French as a fur trading post for commerce with Native Americans, it was also tied to trade for plains bison. European trappers who hunted in the Red River of the North area frequently married Native women and often lived with local tribes at least part of the year. Their descendants became part of their hunting and trapping culture, and formed the ethnic group recognized in Canada as Métis people.

The settlement was associated with the histories of French Canada, the North West Company (NWC), the Hudson's Bay Company (HBC), the Red River Colony, Battle of Seven Oaks, the Red River Rebellion, Assiniboia, and Manitoba. Through much of the nineteenth century, Métis families used the two-wheeled Red River ox cart trains to travel into the Great Plains, where the men would hunt bison and women would process the meat, skins, and bones. All parts were used for clothing, tepees, etc. Their regular trade routes became known as the Red River Trails. This area was part of the United States' Dakota and Minnesota territories; and Canada–US border politics.

=== Fort Pembina trading posts ===
- Peter Grant of the North West Company, between 1784 and 1789, built a post on the east side of the Red River. It had disappeared by 1801.
- In 1797, Jean Baptiste Chaboillez of the North West Company built a post on the south bank of the Pembina in what is now Pembina State Park.
- From 1800 to 1805, the XY Company had a post within sight of the two following posts. It was absorbed by the North West Company.
- In 1801, Alexander Henry the younger, also of the North West Company, built a post on the north bank across from Chaboillez's post. He remained in charge until 1808. It was absorbed by the Hudson's Bay Company in 1821.
- By 1793, the Hudson's Bay Company had a small post (seemingly called Fort Skene) on the east side on the Red River. It was rebuilt in 1801. By 1805, most of the local beaver had been exterminated. Pembina was the traditional rendezvous for the Métis buffalo hunt. It was also a center for illicit trade with the United States. The HBC post operated until at least 1870, even though it was known to be south of the border.
- In 1812, Selkirk settlers from the Red River Colony built Fort Daer on the Chaboillez site.
- In the 1820s, David Thompson determined that Pembina was south of the 49th parallel, and therefore had been transferred to the United States from British Rupert's Land by the Treaty of 1818.
- In the 1840s, Norman Kittson of the American Fur Company had an establishment.
- In September 1872, a joint Canadian and American boundary survey commission met in Pembina where they over-wintered before setting off in the spring of 1873 to survey and mark the Canada-U.S. border along the 49th parallel.

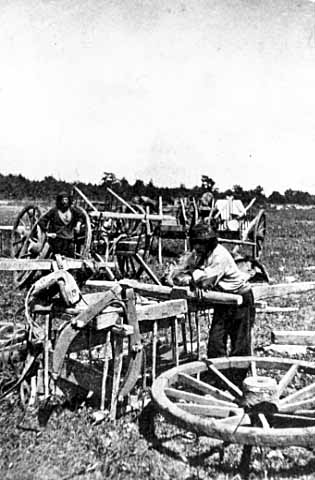
Preparing Red River ox cart at Pembina, North Dakota, for trip to St. Anthony Falls, Minnesota

=== Fort Pembina ===
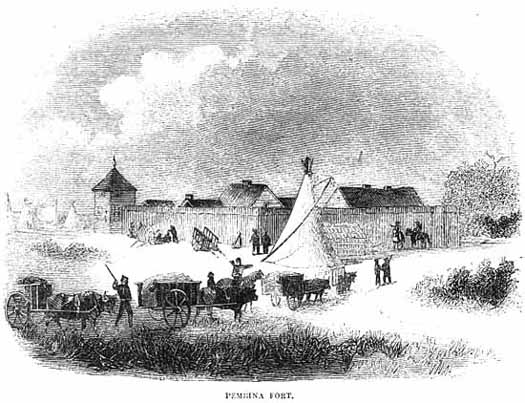
Fort Pembina and Red River ox carts, c. 1870

Due to the unrest among Native Americans of the Red River Valley after the American Civil War, the Minnesota Legislature petitioned Congress to build a fort, especially to defend against incursions by the Lakota (Sioux), some of whom had migrated to Rupert's Land to evade the US Army.

As a result, Major General Winfield Scott Hancock recommended the establishment of the post on December 8, 1869; Fort Pembina was completed on July 8, 1870. Located 1 1/2 miles (2.4 km) south of the settlement, it was just above the mouth of the Pembina River. It was originally called Fort Thomas, for Major General George Henry Thomas, who died on March 28, 1870. The post was designated as Fort Pembina on September 6, 1870. Seriously damaged by fire on May 27, 1895, it was abandoned on August 16, 1895. It was later sold at public auction.

=== Métis in Pembina ===
The Métis had a very strong connection with Pembina during the 19th century. Individual and groups of bison hunters and goods traders were based in Pembina. In 1818, with the help of Father Dumoulin, the Roman Catholic Church created a mission in Pembina with the goal of converting buffalo hunters and other Native Americans to Catholicism. The records show a clear engagement among the Métis with Catholicism; Father Dumoulin baptised 394 people before the closure of the mission in 1823, and Assomption Catholic Church recorded 166 burials between 1848 and 1892 (with 147 being either French or English/Scottish Métis.)

=== Recent history ===
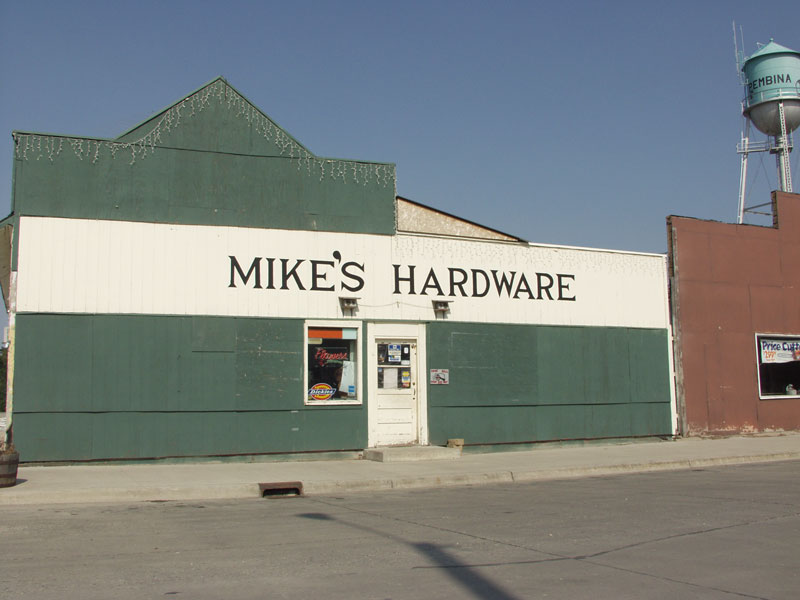
A hardware store in Pembina, North Dakota.

In 1962, Winnipeg-based coach bus manufacturer Motor Coach Industries opened its U.S. assembly line in Pembina.

Pembina was officially designated as a city in 1967.

The noted American author Louise Erdrich has represented the Pembina River and the Pembina Band of the Ojibwe Indians on the Turtle Mountain Reservation in numerous works of fiction. In the past several books, the Pembina have celebrated their unique heritage.

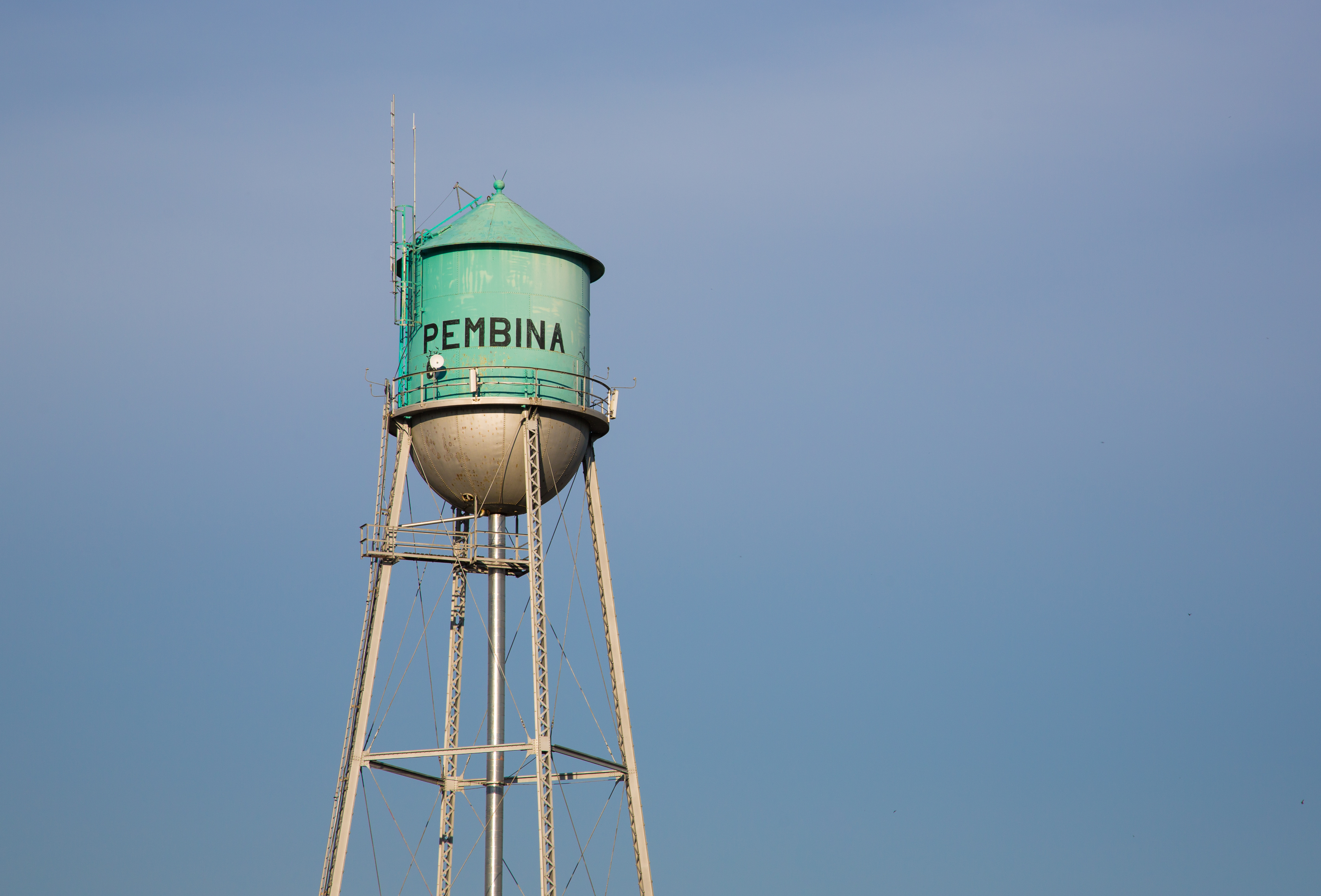
Pembina Water Tower

Despite its small size, Pembina maintained a television station, KCND-TV channel 12, from 1960 to 1975. The station was a border blaster primarily targeting Winnipeg from as close to the border as possible; when simultaneous substitution rules took effect in the early 1970s, Canadian interests bought the intellectual property of the station and relocated it to Winnipeg, where it was relicensed by the Canadian government as CKND-TV channel 9, and has operated there ever since. Channel 12 in Pembina was rechristened in 1986 as KNRR, a satellite of KVRR Fargo.

Its population in federal censuses has never exceeded 1,000.

Motor Coach Industries had planned to close its Pembina factory in late 2022 after moving production to parent company NFI Group's plant in Crookston, Minnesota, but reversed their decision in November 2023.

== Geography ==
Pembina is in the far northeastern corner of the North Dakota, at the confluence of the Red River of the North and the Pembina River. The city of St. Vincent, Minnesota, lies adjacent to the east, across the Red River. The town of Emerson, Manitoba, lies just north of the city on the other side of the international border.

According to the United States Census Bureau, the city has a total area of 0.77 square miles (1.99 km^{2}), all land.

Pembina experiences a dry winter humid continental climate (Köppen Dwb).

Climate data for Pembina, North Dakota (1991–2020 normals, extremes 1898–present)
Month	Jan	Feb	Mar	Apr	May	Jun	Jul	Aug	Sep	Oct	Nov	Dec	Year
Record high °F (°C)	50 (10)	61 (16)	75 (24)	99 (37)	106 (41)	103 (39)	109 (43)	104 (40)	102 (39)	93 (34)	78 (26)	62 (17)	109 (43)
Mean maximum °F (°C)	37.0 (2.8)	38.5 (3.6)	52.1 (11.2)	71.0 (21.7)	85.0 (29.4)	88.8 (31.6)	89.3 (31.8)	90.7 (32.6)	86.2 (30.1)	75.5 (24.2)	53.7 (12.1)	39.3 (4.1)	93.3 (34.1)
Mean daily maximum °F (°C)	12.7 (−10.7)	17.9 (−7.8)	31.4 (−0.3)	50.0 (10.0)	64.9 (18.3)	74.7 (23.7)	78.9 (26.1)	78.1 (25.6)	68.6 (20.3)	52.0 (11.1)	33.6 (0.9)	19.5 (−6.9)	48.5 (9.2)
Daily mean °F (°C)	4.0 (−15.6)	8.2 (−13.2)	22.2 (−5.4)	39.5 (4.2)	53.3 (11.8)	63.9 (17.7)	67.9 (19.9)	66.0 (18.9)	56.7 (13.7)	42.2 (5.7)	25.8 (−3.4)	11.6 (−11.3)	38.4 (3.6)
Mean daily minimum °F (°C)	−4.8 (−20.4)	−1.6 (−18.7)	12.9 (−10.6)	28.9 (−1.7)	41.7 (5.4)	53.1 (11.7)	57.0 (13.9)	53.9 (12.2)	44.9 (7.2)	32.3 (0.2)	18.0 (−7.8)	3.6 (−15.8)	28.3 (−2.1)
Mean minimum °F (°C)	−28 (−33)	−23.5 (−30.8)	−12.5 (−24.7)	12.3 (−10.9)	26.0 (−3.3)	38.7 (3.7)	45.0 (7.2)	41.8 (5.4)	30.6 (−0.8)	17.1 (−8.3)	−1.7 (−18.7)	−19.2 (−28.4)	−30.2 (−34.6)
Record low °F (°C)	−48 (−44)	−46 (−43)	−39 (−39)	−12 (−24)	9 (−13)	22 (−6)	33 (1)	25 (−4)	12 (−11)	−2 (−19)	−39 (−39)	−44 (−42)	−48 (−44)
Average precipitation inches (mm)	0.53 (13)	0.39 (9.9)	0.77 (20)	1.07 (27)	3.23 (82)	4.06 (103)	3.32 (84)	2.56 (65)	2.78 (71)	1.83 (46)	0.91 (23)	0.64 (16)	22.09 (561)
Average precipitation days (≥ 0.01 in)	7.4	6.4	6.4	6.0	11.1	13.3	10.8	9.5	8.9	8.4	6.8	9.0	104.0
Source: NOAA

== Demographics ==
Historical population
Census	Pop.	Note	%±
1880	287		—
1890	670		133.4%
1900	929		38.7%
1910	717		−22.8%
1920	802		11.9%
1930	551		−31.3%
1940	703		27.6%
1950	640		−9.0%
1960	625		−2.3%
1970	741		18.6%
1980	673		−9.2%
1990	642		−4.6%
2000	642		0.0%
2010	592		−7.8%
2020	512		−13.5%
2022 (est.)	504		−1.6%
U.S. Decennial Census; 2020 Census

=== 2010 census ===
As of the census of 2010, there were 592 people, 237 households, and 156 families residing in the city. The population density was 768.8 inhabitants per square mile (296.8/km^{2}). There were 279 housing units at an average density of 362.3 per square mile (139.9/km^{2}). The racial makeup of the city was 94.1% European American, 0.5% African American, 0.3% Native American, 1.0% Asian, 1.4% from other races, and 2.7% from two or more races. Hispanic or Latino of any race were 1.4% of the population.

There were 237 households, of which 29.1% had children under the age of 18 living with them, 57.4% were married couples living together, 5.1% had a female householder with no husband present, 3.4% had a male householder with no wife present, and 34.2% were non-families. 30.8% of all households were made up of individuals, and 10.1% had someone living alone who was 65 years of age or older. The average household size was 2.50 and the average family size was 3.17.

The median age in the city was 40.6 years. 26.2% of residents were under the age of 18; 6.4% were between the ages of 18 and 24; 23.4% were from 25 to 44; 29.9% were from 45 to 64; and 14.2% were 65 years of age or older. The gender makeup of the city was 48.3% male and 51.7% female.

=== 2000 census ===
As of the census of 2000, there were 642 people, 250 households, and 177 families residing in the city. The population density was 843.1 inhabitants per square mile (325.5/km^{2}). There were 274 housing units at an average density of 359.8 per square mile (138.9/km^{2}). The racial makeup of the city was 96.57% European American, 0.16% African American, 0.47% Native American, 0.47% Asian, 1.56% from other races, and 0.78% from two or more races. Hispanic or Latino of any race were 1.87% of the population.

There were 250 households, out of which 35.2% had children under the age of 18 living with them, 62.8% were married couples living together, 5.2% had a female householder with no husband present, and 28.8% were non-families. 26.8% of all households were made up of individuals, and 11.2% had someone living alone who was 65 years of age or older. The average household size was 2.57 and the average family size was 3.12.

In the city, the population was spread out, with 29.4% under the age of 18, 4.8% from 18 to 24, 29.0% from 25 to 44, 24.0% from 45 to 64, and 12.8% who were 65 years of age or older. The median age was 37 years. For every 100 females, there were 98.8 males. For every 100 females age 18 and over, there were 105.0 males.

The median income for a household in the city was $55,536, and the median income for a family was $59,722. Males had a median income of $35,250 versus $26,125 for females. The per capita income for the city was $20,278. About 4.5% of families and 7.7% of the population were below the poverty line, including 12.1% of those under age 18 and 8.2% of those age 65 or over.

== Sites of interest ==
- Dumoulin Mission and Cemetery Site, located north of Pembina along north-bound Interstate 29.
- Fort Daer Landing And Recreation Area.
- Grace Episcopal Church (Pembina, North Dakota)
- Pembina State Museum - interpretative exhibits commemorating establishment of Pembina in 1797 as the earliest European settlement in what is now the state of North Dakota.
- Pembina State Park - a protected area at the confluence of the Red and Pembina Rivers.
- Icelandic Evangelical Lutheran Church
- United States Customs House and Post Office – Pembina

== See also ==
- Battle of Grand Coteau (North Dakota)
- List of Canada-United States border crossings
- Métis buffalo hunt
