= Battle of Boffalora =

- Part of the Second Italian War of Independence
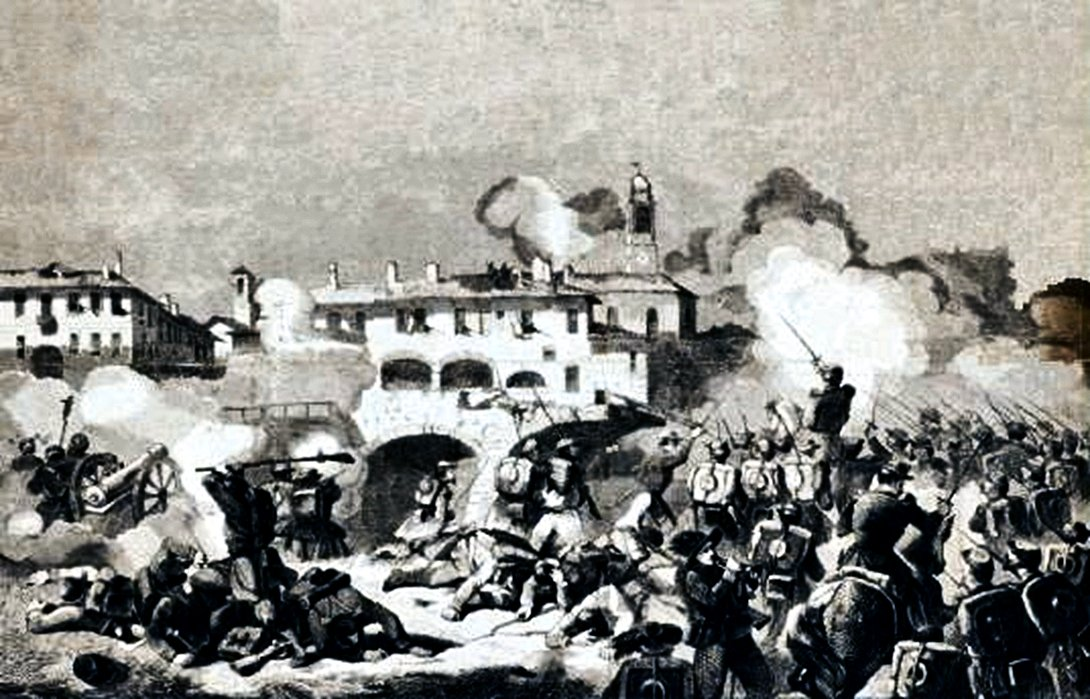
- Battle of Boffalora
Date	4 June 1859
Location	Boffalora sopra Ticino, Italy
Result	French victory

Belligerents
(France) French Empire	(Austrian Empire) Austria

Commanders and leaders
(France) La Motte-Rouge	(Austrian Empire) Eduard Clam-Gallas

Strength
15,000	15,000

Casualties and losses
53 killed	100 killed 200 wounded

The Battle of Boffalora (or more properly Battle of Boffalora sopra Ticino) was part of the Second Italian War of Independence. It was fought on 4 June 1859 at Boffalora sopra Ticino, between the 2nd Imperial Royal Austrian Army of the Austrian Empire and the French Army of Italy France-Piedmontese coming from Piedmont. It represents a phase of the better-known Battle of Magenta which ended a few hours later in the town of Magenta, Lombardy, a few kilometers away from Boffalora.

== Background ==
The Piedmontese, following their defeat by Austria in the First Italian War of Independence, recognized their need for allies. That led Prime Minister Camillo Benso, Count of Cavour to attempt to establish relations with other European powers, partially through Piedmont's participation in the Crimean War. In the peace conference at Paris after the Crimean War, Cavour attempted to bring attention to efforts for Italian unification. He found Britain and France to be sympathetic but refusing to go against Austrian wishes, as any movement towards Italian independence would threaten Austria's territory of Lombardy–Venetia. Private talks between Napoleon III and Cavour after the conference identified Napoleon as the most likely candidate to aid Italy although he was still uncommitted.

On 14 January 1858, Felice Orsini, an Italian, led an attempt on Napoleon III's life. The assassination attempt brought widespread sympathy for the Italian unity and had a profound effect on Napoleon III himself, who now was determined to help Piedmont against Austria to defuse the wider revolutionary activities, which governments in Italy might later allow to happen. After a covert meeting at Plombières on 21 July 1858, Napoleon III and Cavour signed a secret treaty of alliance against Austria on 28 January 1859.

France would help Piedmont-Sardinia, if attacked, to fight against Austria if Piedmont-Sardinia gave Nice and Savoy to France in return. The secret alliance served both countries by helping with the Sardinian-Piedmontese plan of unification of the Italian Peninsula under the House of Savoy. It also weakened Austria, a fiery adversary of Napoleon III's French Second Empire.

Cavour, being unable to get French help unless the Austrians attacked first, provoked Vienna by a series of military maneuvers close to the border. Sardinia mobilised its army on 9 March 1859. Austria mobilised on 9 April 1859 and issued an ultimatum on 23 April demanding the complete demobilisation of the Sardinian Army. When it was not heeded, Austria started a war against Sardinia on 26 April.

The first French troops entered Piedmont on 25 April, and France declared war on Austria on 3 May. After the outbreak of the war between Piedmont and Austria, field marshal Ferenc Gyulay waited for the Franco-Piedmontese to cross the Ticino river in area around Piacenza, deceived by some tactical moves made by Napoleon III's troops in the area. When the Austrians realized it was too late to move their troops and that the French trap had already had its first effects in Vigevano and Abbiategrasso, they decided to retreat along the line between the Naviglio Grande and the Ticino.

Already on the night between 2 and 3 June the French had begun to create a new crossing point with a pontoon bridge 180 meters long in front of Turbigo, supporting the first clashes and allowing the passage of the II Army corps under the command of General Mac Mahon with the intention of pushing towards Magenta. Napoleon III was stationed further south on the Novara-Magenta route, ready to cross the Ticino on the San Martino Bridge in conjunction with the arrival of Mac Mahon's divisions from Turbigo. Mac Mahon, having arrived in Lombardy, divided his forces into two lines of attack: General Charles-Marie-Esprit Espinasse towards Marcallo con Casone and General De La Moutterouge towards Boffalora sopra Ticino where the Austrians were also moving to try to stem the enemy invasion.

== The battle ==
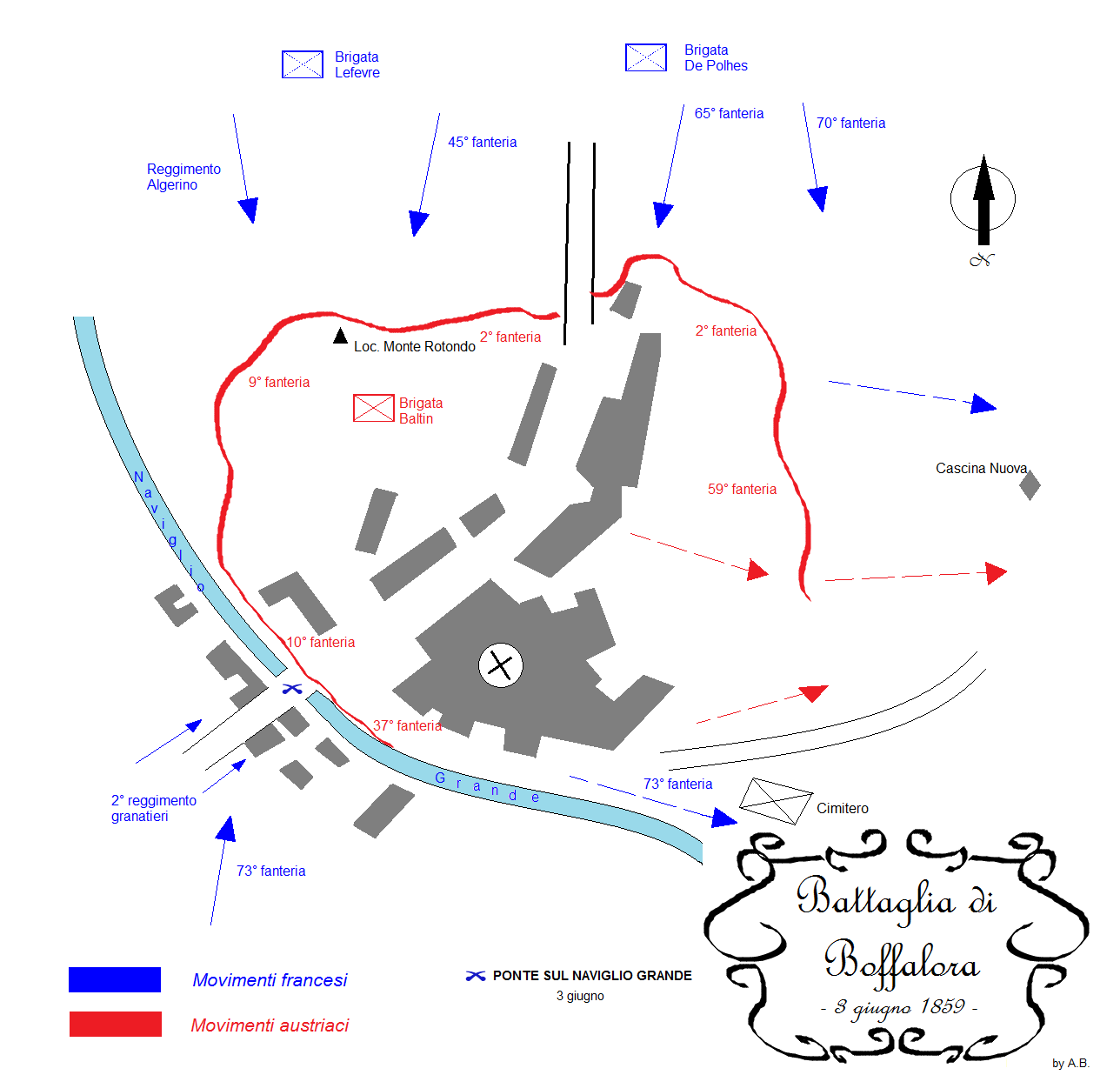
Schema of the battle of Boffalora of 4 June 1859

Military operations in Boffalora sopra Ticino began on 3 June when the 1st Army Corps of the imperial army commanded by field marshal lieutenant count Eduard Clam-Gallas was permanently established in the town. He had taken steps to undermine the ancient bridge located in the center of the town (dating back to 1603) with the intention of blowing it up if the French attempted to reach the Milanese across the border at Boffalora.

The French had divided into two columns: the first column had the order to force the Ticino to Turbigo and then head the following day towards the south-east (Battle of Turbigo on 3 June). When the first column reached Boffalora, the second column would have crossed the Ticino through the San Martino bridge near Boffalora and Magenta. The first column arrived near Boffalora in the early afternoon of 4 June where it clashed with the Austrian forces defending the town. The French of the second column, hearing the first artillery shots from the first column, pushed towards Boffalora along the paths that led from the Ticino valley to the vicinity of the Bevilacqua, Venegoni and Cucchiani farms where they had the first clashes.

Around 12.00 the Austrians had previously blown up the bridge over the Naviglio with explosives, the French of the 2nd Grenadier Regiment of Colonel D'Alton, supported by the vaulters, arrived in the town but realized that crossing the bridge was more complex than expected since an artillery battery and a rocket battery were aimed at it. The French managed to throw a makeshift walkway over the remains of the bridge. The Algerian marksmen's regiment (turcos) and the 45th of the line rushed at this point to attack the artillery batteries forcing them to flee around 3.00 pm.

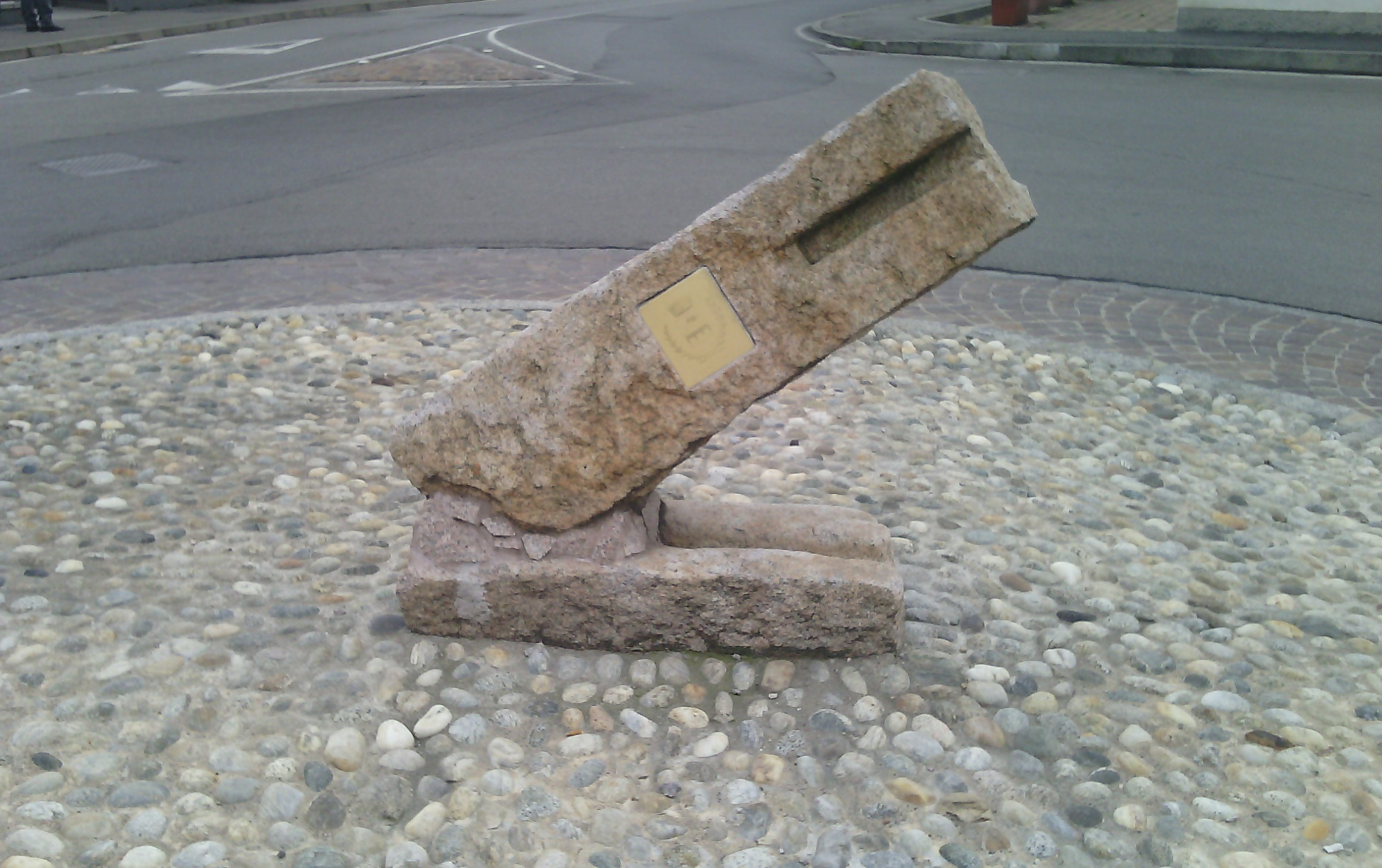
Fragment of the ancient Boffalora bridge destroyed during the battle of 1859. Today it has been recovered and converted into a monument in memory of the battle.

A detailed chronicle of the events of that day is provided to us directly by the parish priest of Boffalora at the time, Francesco Maria Bodio, who followed the unfolding of the battle from the bell tower of the parish church of Santa Maria della Neve, annotations still present today in the parish Chronicon.

== Battle orders ==
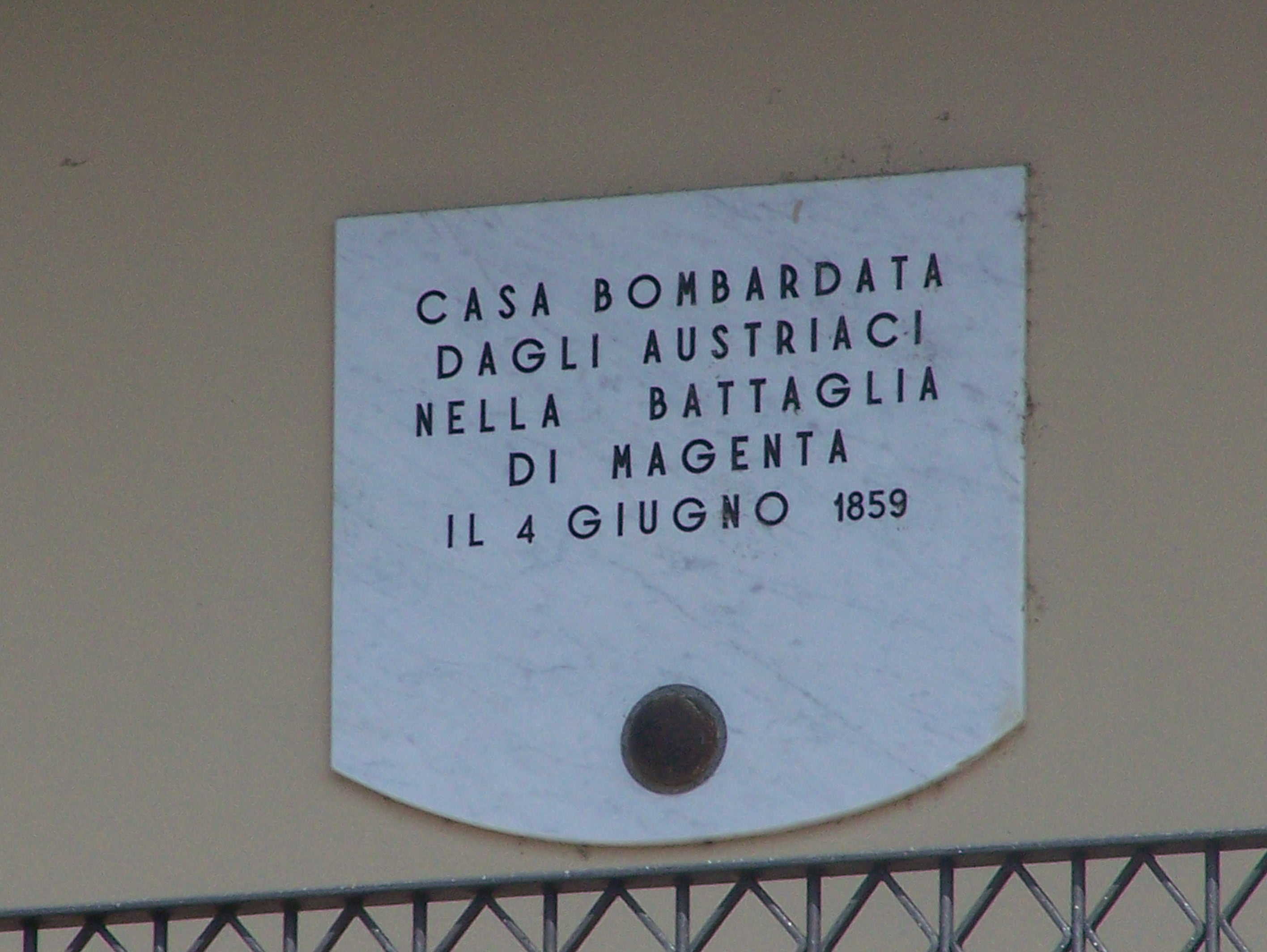
On a private house in Boffalora sopra Ticino still today you can read "HOUSE BOMBED BY THE AUSTRIANS IN THE BATTLE OF MAGENTA - 4 JUNE 1859" with a cannonball still visible on the facade. Presumably it is a French cannonball and not an Austrian one as it comes from the French side.

=== French ===
- 1st Lefévre Brigade
  - Algerian marksman regiment Archinard
  - 45th Line Regiment Manuelle
- 2nd De Polhes Brigade
  - 65th Drouhot Regiment
  - 70th Donay Regiment
- 73rd O'Malley Regiment of the 1st Martimprey Brigade
- 2nd Grenadier Regiment Colonel Dalton of the 2nd General Brigade of Wimpffen

=== Austrians ===
- De Baltin Brigade
  - 10th Hunter Battalion
  - 9th Count Hartmann Regiment of 4 battalions
  - 5th Foot Battery of the 2nd Regiment
- 37th Archduke Joseph Regiment of 4 battalions of the Baron De Reznicek Brigade
- 59th Arciduca Ranieri Regiment of 3 battalions

== Important personalities who took part in the Battle of Boffalora ==
=== Austrians ===
- Eduard Clam-Gallas, field marshal lieutenant
- Karl Anton Josef von Baltin, major general

=== French ===
- Joseph Édouard de la Motte-Rouge, general of division
- Balthazar De Polhes, brigadier general
- Alfred Dalton, Colonel

== Aftermath ==
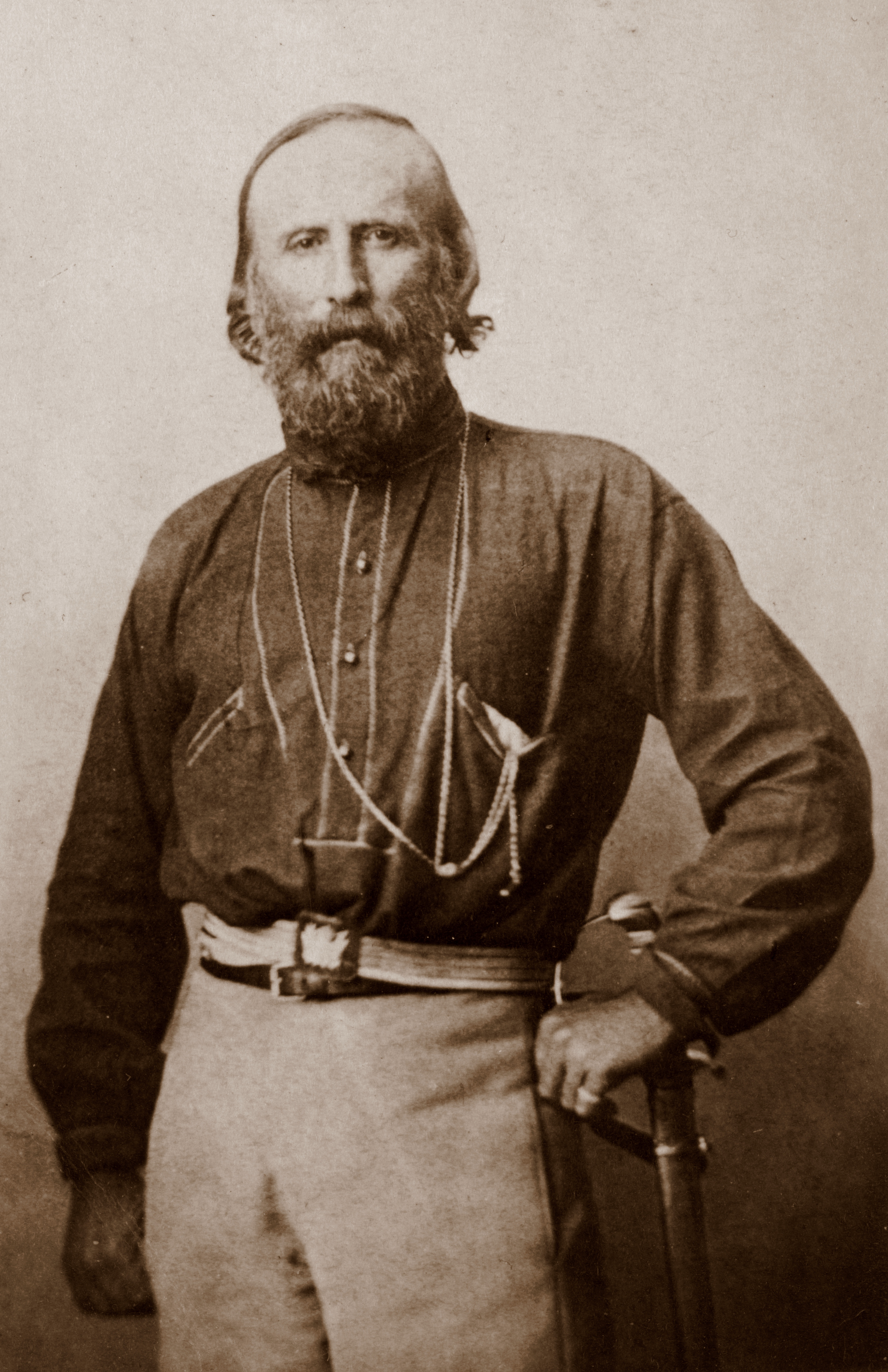
Giuseppe Garibaldi led his volunteers to major victories against vastly-superior Austrians, such as the battles of Varese and San Fermo.

After the Battle of Solferino, a cease fire is accorded on the 8 July. The two emperors meet on 11 July at Villafranca di Verona and the armistice is signed on the following day - the Peace of Villafranca.

Napoleon III signed the armistice with Austria at Villafranca for a combination of reasons. The Austrians had retreated to the Quadrilateral, which would be very costly to overrun. His absence in France had made the country vulnerable to attack. His actions in Italy were being criticised in France. He did not want Cavour and Piedmont to gain too much power, mostly at the expense of his men. He feared involvement of the German states. Most of Lombardy, with its capital, Milan, except only the Austrian fortresses of Mantua and Legnago and the surrounding territory, was transferred from Austria to France, which would immediately cede the territories to Sardinia. The rulers of Central Italy, who had been expelled by revolution shortly after the beginning of the war, were to be restored.

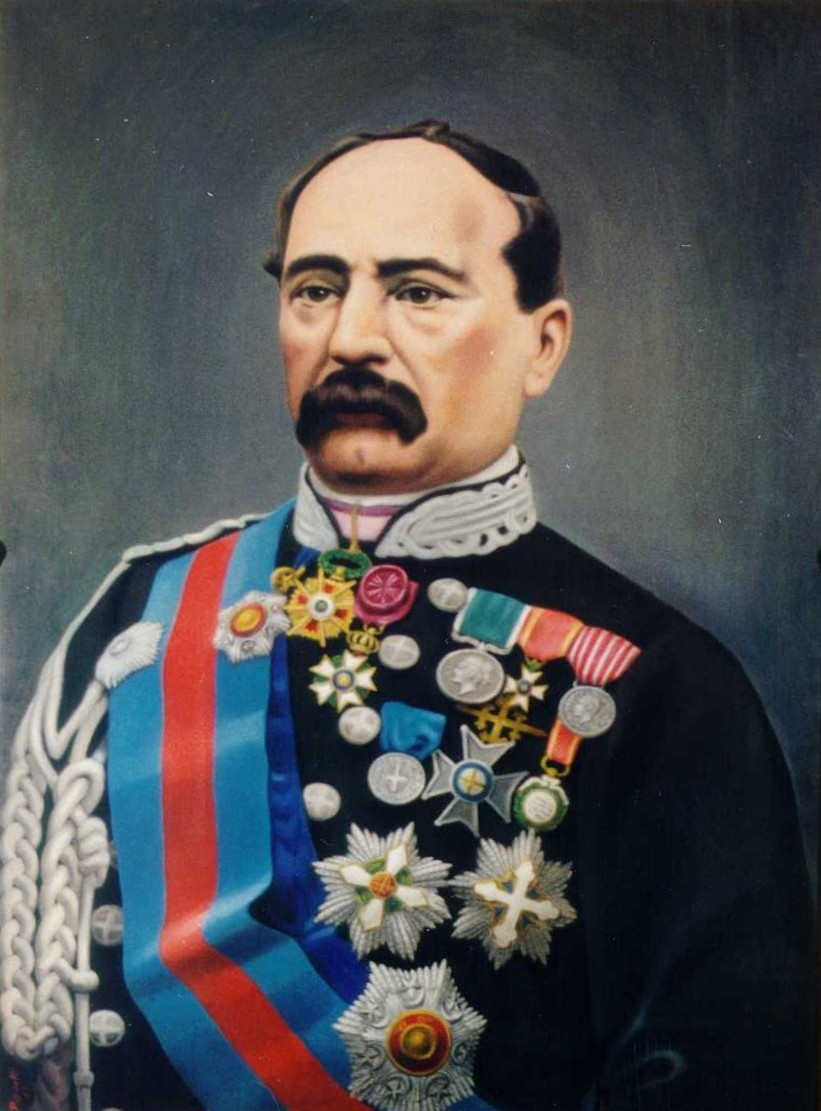
Manfredo Fanti, who led the Sardinian troops in the Battle of Palestro

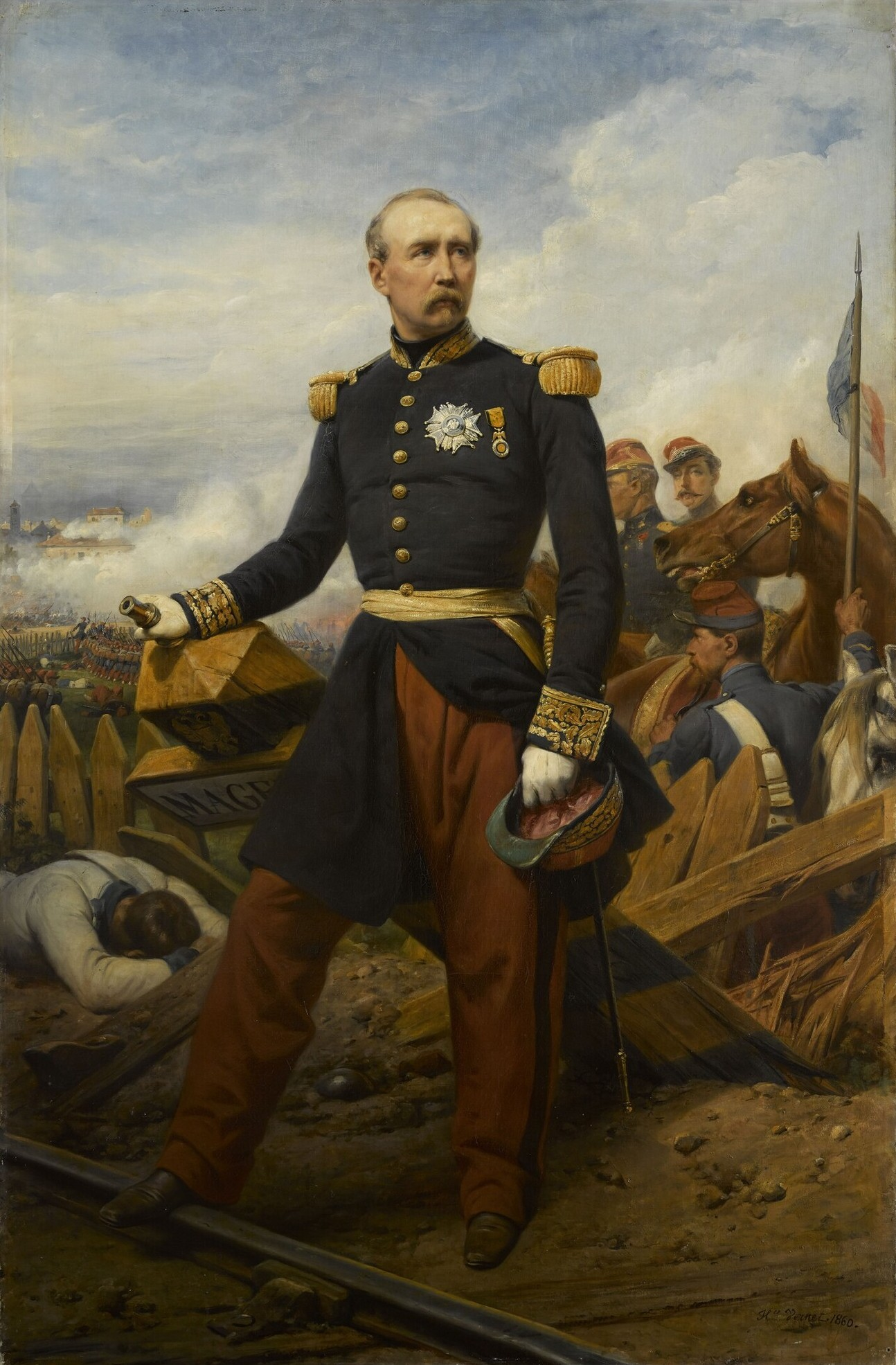
Patrice de Mac-Mahon, whose participation in the war was decisive for the victory

The agreement, made by Napoleon behind the backs of his Sardinian allies, led to great outrage in Piedmont-Sardinia, and Cavour resigned in protest. However, the Villafranca terms never took effect. Although they were reaffirmed by the final Treaty of Zürich in 11 November, the agreement had become a dead letter. The central Italian states were occupied by Piedmont, which would not restore the previous rulers, and France was unwilling to force them to do so.

The Austrians were left to look on in frustration at the French failure to carry out the terms of the treaty. Austria had emerged triumphantly after the suppression of liberal movements in 1849, but its status as a great power on the European scene was now seriously challenged and its influence in Italy severely weakened.

The next year, with French and British approval, the central Italian states (Duchy of Parma, Duchy of Modena, Grand Duchy of Tuscany, and Papal States) were annexed by the Kingdom of Sardinia, and France took its deferred rewards of Savoy and Nice. The last move was vehemently opposed by Italian national hero Garibaldi, a native of Nice, and directly led to Garibaldi's expedition to Sicily, which would complete the preliminary Unification of Italy. The annexation of Nice to France caused the Niçard exodus, or the emigration of a quarter of the Niçard Italians to Italy, and the Niçard Vespers.

During the war, Prussia also mobilized 132,000 men, but never joined the fighting. The weaknesses laid bare during the mobilization caused the Prussian Army to initiate military reforms. These reforms were the basis for Prussia's rapid victories over Austria in 1866 and France in 1870-71, which led to a united Germany under Prussian dominance.

== Bibliography ==
- Brooks, R. (2009). Solferino 1859: The Battle for Italy's freedom. Osprey Publishing. ISBN 978-1-84603-385-8.
- Cappelletti, Antonio (1872). Trattato elementare di costruzione delle strade ferrate italiane. Milano: Galle e Omodei editori e libraj.
- Allmayer-Beck/Lessing: Die K.(u.)K. Armee 1848 - 1914. Gütersloh 1980, ISBN 3-570-07287-8
- Balzarotti Andrea, Boffalora sopra Ticino - Arte e cultura lungo il Naviglio Grande, Amministrazione Comunale di Boffalora sopra Ticino, O.L.C.A. Grafiche, Magenta, 2008
- Viviani Ambrogio, Magenta, 4 giugno 1859 - dalle ricerche la prima storia vera, Edizione speciale per i 150° anni della Battaglia di Magenta, Zeisciu Ed., 2009
- Victor, Paul, La guerra d'Italia del 1859. Quadro storico, politico e militare, ristampa ed. Zeisciu, 2009
- Tunesi Ermanno, 4 giugno 1859 – 2009. 150ª Battaglia di Magenta. Le vignette SAFFA del Centenario - Album storico, Associazione Storica ‘La Piarda’, Boffalora S. Ticino, 2009
