= Franz von Cordon =

Austrian general and politician (1796–1869)

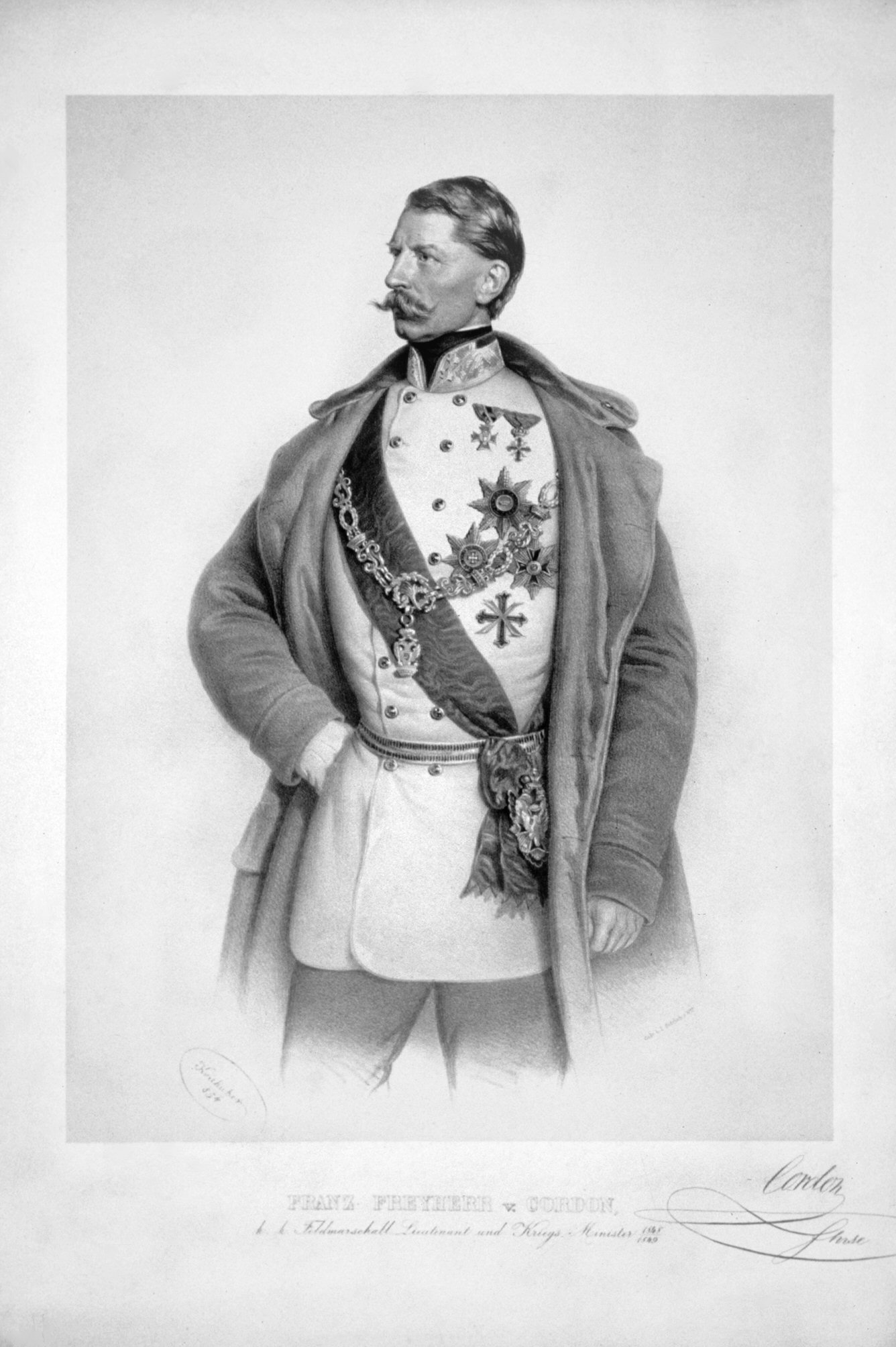
- Franz von Cordon in a lithograph from 1854
- Born: 1796; Vienna, Austria
- Died: January 15, 1869 (aged 73); Vienna, Austria-Hungary
- Military career
- Allegiance: Austrian Empire
- Branch: Imperial Austrian Army
- Service years: 1816–1866
- Rank: General of the Artillery
- Conflicts: Hungarian Revolution of 1848; Second Italian War of Independence: Battle of Magenta; Battle of Turbigo; Third Italian War of Independence

Franz Freiherr von Cordon was an Austrian General of the Artillery and politician who served as the Austrian Minister of War from November 21, 1848, to June 2, 1849.

== Biography ==
Franz von Cordon was born in Vienna in 1796 and, still very young, he decided to pursue a military career, training in the branch of engineers. On 1 September 1816 he officially joined the Imperial Austrian Army as a cadet, being promoted the following year to the rank of second lieutenant and then to that of lieutenant in September 1818. On 19 November 1830 he obtained the rank of captain, being assigned first to the main engineering office in Vienna and then in Bohemia and then in Italy where, on February 26 of that same year, General Radetzky chose him as his aide-de-camp. In 1831 he was promoted to the rank of major. In April 1834 he obtained the rank of lieutenant colonel in the 45th Infantry Regiment, a position he held until September 18, 1838, when he was promoted to the rank of colonel in the "Wimpffen" infantry regiment, with which he remained for some time in Graz. During this period he was also able to earn the esteem of the local inhabitants, receiving the honorary citizenship of Graz and Rijeka. On April 18, 1846, he was promoted to the rank of major general first and then of brigadier general, being recalled to Vienna. In March 1848, he was included in the court war council and during the occupation of Vienna on November 1, 1848, he managed to restore order in the city, subsequently assuming that post as minister of war of the empire. With this position, in June 1849 he was promoted to the rank of field marshal lieutenant, but he decided to leave the post of minister that same year to return to the battlefield, asking for and receiving the command of a division. Being back to the frontlines, he took part in the Battle of Magenta during the Second Italian War of Independence. During the war he also participated at the Battle of Turbigo. For his actions, he was included in the Emperor's board of directors. After the Third Italian War of Independence, he retired and was assigned the ownership of the 53rd infantry regiment "Arciduca Leopoldo", stationed in Gorizia.

He died in Vienna in 1869.

== Awards ==
- Austria: Order of the Iron Crown, Knight Grand Cordon with Collar
- Austria: Cross of Seniority

=== Foreign Awards ===
- Parma: Constantinian Order of Saint George, Grand Cross
- Papal States: Order of St. Gregory the Great, Knight of the Grand Cross
- Russia: Order of Saint Vladimir, 1st Class Knight
