= Joseph Édouard de la Motte-Rouge =

French general and politician

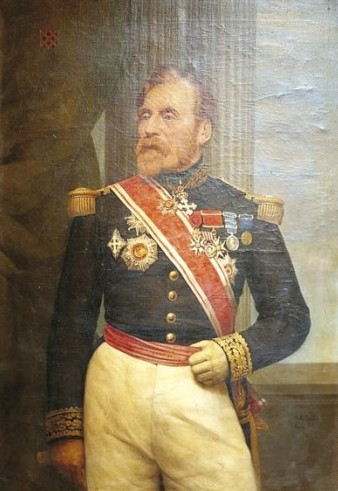
- Born: 3 February 1804; Pléneuf-Val-André, Côtes-d'Armor, French Empire
- Died: 29 January 1883 (aged 78); Hénansal, Côtes-d'Armor, French Republic
- Military career
- Allegiance: Bourbon Restoration; July Monarchy; French Second Republic; Second French Empire; French Third Republic
- Branch: French Army
- Service years: 1821 – 1870
- Commands: Light Infantry
- Conflicts: Hundred Thousand Sons of Saint Louis; Belgian Revolution; Crimean War; Second Italian War of Independence; Franco-Prussian War: Battle of Artenay
- Other work: Deputy of Côtes-du-Nord; Senator of the Second Empire

Joseph Édouard de La Motte-Rouge (1804-1883) was a French general and politician.

== Biography ==
Motte-Rouge was trained at the Saint-Cyr military school from 1819 to 1821, he was assigned to the Spanish expedition as a second lieutenant in the 22nd line infantry battalion. He witnessed the battles of Corunna and San Sebastián, and was part of the occupying forces in the division of Madrid until 1825.

In 1830, during the Belgian Revolution, he was assigned to the Army of the North of Marshal Gerard and takes part in the fighting against the United Kingdom of the Netherlands, which end with the taking of Antwerp (December 1832): he was promoted to captain.

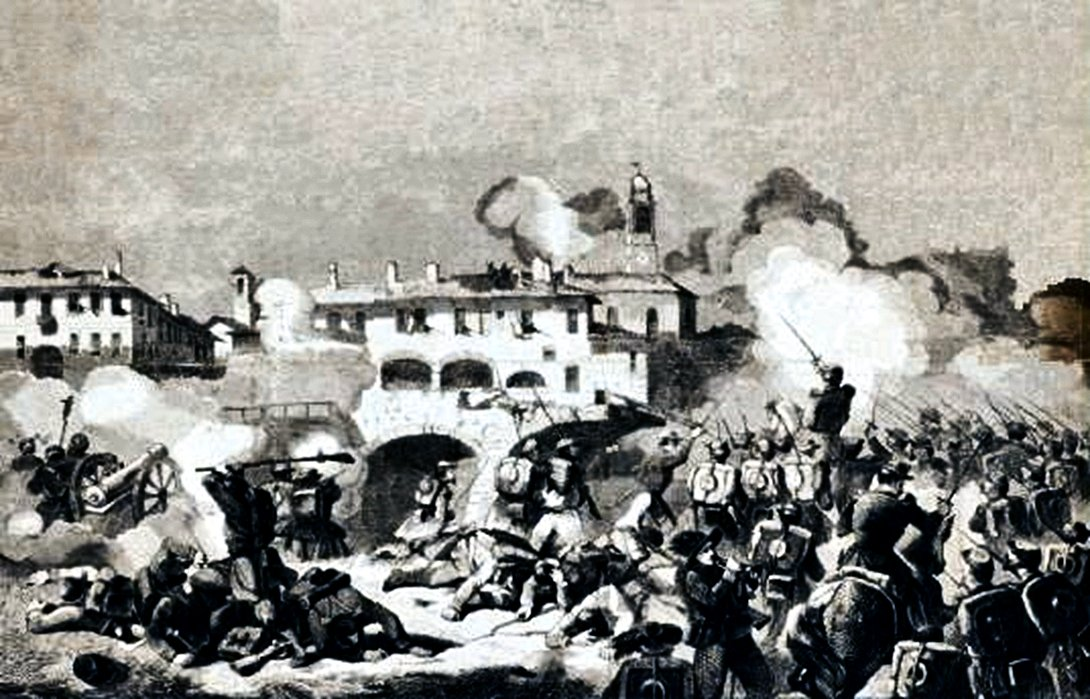
Capture of Buffalora during the Battle of Magenta, one of the deeds of General de la Motte-Rouge.

On 15 July 1848, he was appointed colonel of the 19th Light Infantry regiment. After various assignments in the North of France, he was appointed brigadier general after the coup d'état of 1851 . Assigned to Varna during the Crimean War (1853), he took part in the Battle of Alma, he even distinguished himself at the Battle of Inkerman. Promoted to Division General in June 1855. He received the command of the 2nd Division of the Army of the East, was twice wounded in a general assault that ends the Battle of the Chernaya.

After being commander of the 15th Military Division in Nantes, he would later be commanding the 1st Division 2nd Army Corps of Patrice de MacMahon at the beginning of the Second Italian War of Independence. Its division fought in the battles of Turbigo and Magenta, and played a decisive role in the Battle of Solferino. Retired in 1869, he was elected the same year as the official candidate of Napoleon III in the legislative body in the st district of the North Coast.

However, after the debacle at Sedan, the Government of National Defense reinstated him in the army cadres and he was soon given command of the 15th parked Corps at Nantes, the first nucleus of the Army of the Loire. The government ordered him to march on Orleans, which he reached on October 6, 1870, but his troops were beaten at Artenay by the corps of the Bavarian general von der Thann. La Motte-Rouge had to evacuate Orléans on October 11 but he was immediately dismissed and replaced by General Louis d'Aurelle de Paladines.

== Family ==
The La Motte de La Motte-Rouge family comes from Hénansal, in what is now Côtes-d'Armor.

Joseph-Édouard is the son of Joseph-Marie de La Motte de La Motte-Rouge (1770-1848), battalion commander in the Guard of kings Louis XVIII and Charles X, knight of the Legion of Honor, and Agathe -Julie de La Motte de La Guyomarais, (1771-1833).

He married Clémentine Pocquet de Livonnière (1812-1900) on 18 October 1840 and he remained without a descendant. But his nephews are at the origin of many posterity.

== Awards ==
- Legion of Honor (Grand Officer on 17 June 1859, Grand Cross on 11 October 1873)

=== Foreign Awards ===
- Kingdom of Italy: Order of Saints Maurice and Lazarus
- Ottoman Empire: Order of the Medjidie
- Russian Empire: Order of St. Stanislaus
- United Kingdom: Order of the Bath

== Bibliography ==
- "Joseph Édouard de la Motte-Rouge", in Adolphe Robert and Gaston Cougny, Dictionnaire des parlementaires français (1789–1891), Bourloton, Paris, 1889 Edition details Wikisource;
- Henri de La Messelière, Filiations bretonnes, Saint-Brieuc, éditions Prudhomme, 1922, Tome IV; pages 125-132.
