= Warsaw, North Dakota =

Unincorporated community in North Dakota, US

Coordinates: 48°17′46″N 97°15′17″W

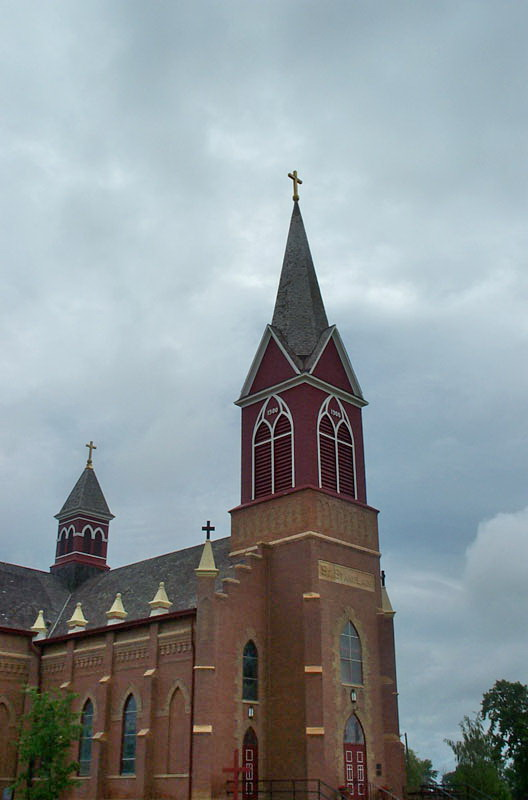
St. Stanislaus Catholic Church in Warsaw

Warsaw is an unincorporated community in Walsh County, North Dakota, United States. It is approximately 5 miles (8.0 km) east of Minto (mailing addresses in Warsaw say "Minto" because mail is delivered by postal workers based there) and about 15 miles southeast of Grafton, the county seat. It is in an area of Walsh County that was settled in the 19th century by immigrants from Poland, and which remained a predominantly Polish-speaking area well beyond the middle of the 20th century. The Catholic Church of St. Stanislaus in Warsaw, built in 1901, is listed in the National Register of Historic Places. Many of the inscriptions on gravestones in the adjacent cemetery are in Polish.

St. Gianna's Maternity Home, which takes in women experiencing "crisis pregnancies" who in some cases might otherwise seek abortions, is located in Warsaw. It is named in honor of Gianna Beretta Molla.

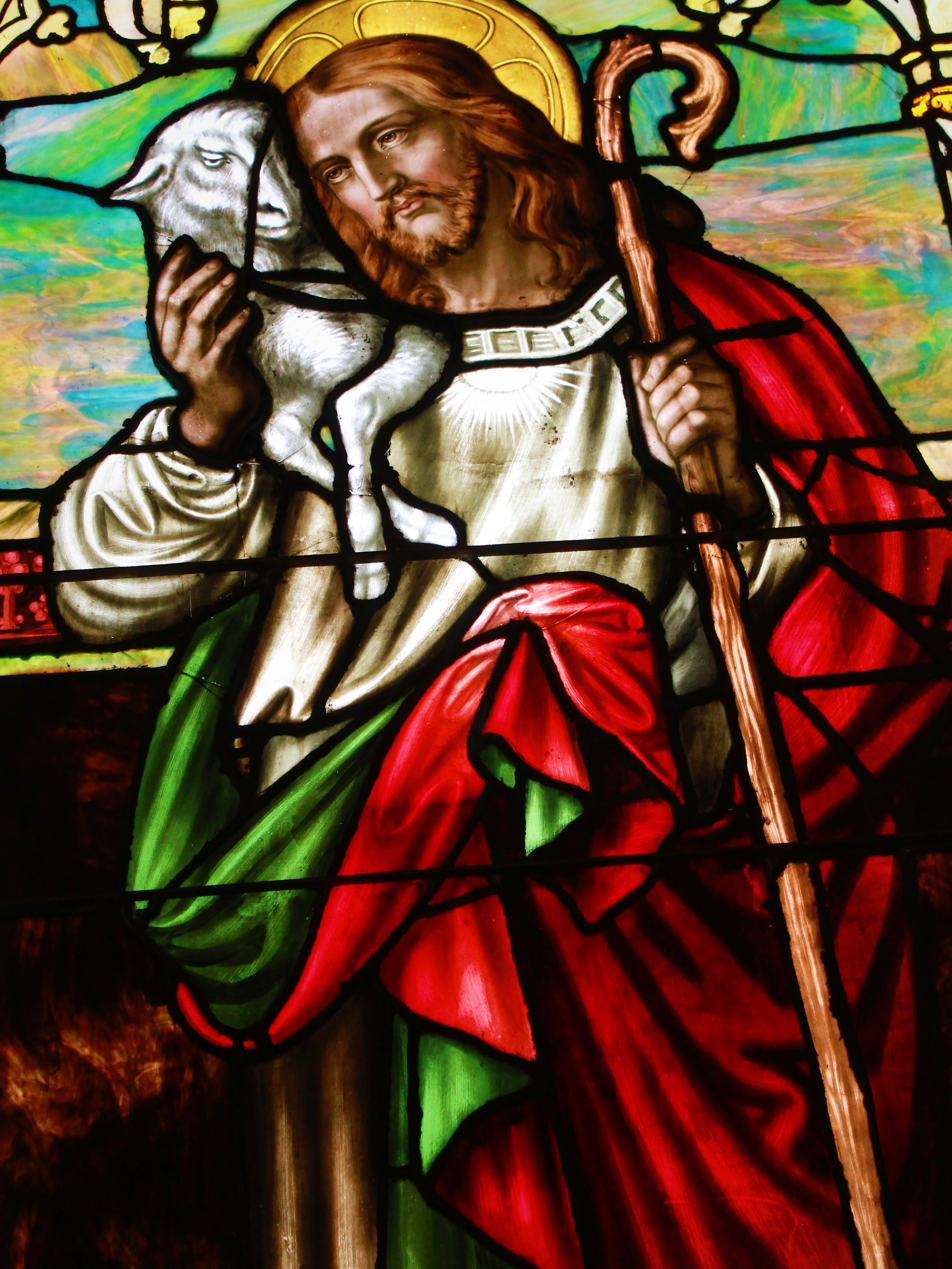
Stained glass window in the Saint Stanislaus Catholic Church
