= Gianna Beretta Molla =

Italian saint (1922–1962)

Saint Gianna Beretta Molla
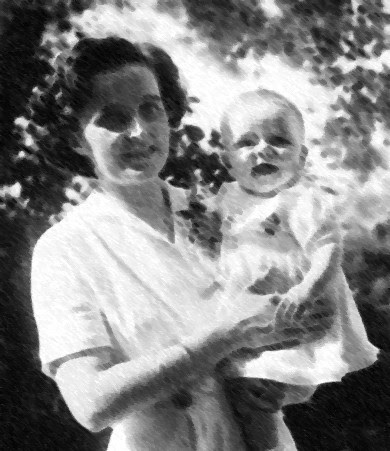
- Born: 4 October 1922; Magenta, Kingdom of Italy
- Died: 28 April 1962 (aged 39); Monza, Italy
- Venerated in: Roman Catholic Church
- Beatified: 24 April 1994, Saint Peter's Square, Vatican City by Pope John Paul II
- Canonized: 16 May 2004, Saint Peter's Square, Vatican City by Pope John Paul II
- Major shrine: Mesero Cemetery Masero, City, Lombardy, Italy
- Feast: 28 April

Gianna Beretta Molla (4 October 1922 – 28 April 1962) was an Italian Catholic pediatrician. Although aware of possible fatal consequences, Molla refused both an abortion and a hysterectomy during her pregnancy with her fourth child in order to preserve the child's life.

Molla's medical career followed the teachings of the Catholic Church; she believed in following her conscience while coming to the aid of others who required assistance. Molla also dedicated herself to charitable work amongst the elderly and was involved in Catholic Action; she also aided the Saint Vincent de Paul group in their outreach to the poor and less fortunate.

Molla's beatification was celebrated in 1994 and she was canonized as a saint a decade later in mid-2004 in Saint Peter's Square.

== Life ==
Gianna Beretta was born in Magenta on 4 October 1922, the Feast of Saint Francis of Assisi, as the tenth of 13 children (only eight survived into adulthood) to Maria de Micheli (c. 1887 - 1 May 1942) and Alberto Beretta (d. 1 September 1942), both members of the Third Order of Saint Francis. One of her siblings was the Servant of God Enrico Beretta (28 August 1916 – 10 August 2001). Beretta's uncle was Monsignor Giuseppe Beretta and one relative was Father Giovanni Battista Beretta. Her other siblings were Giuseppe (a priest), Virginia, and Amalia (1910 – 22 January 1937). Her baptism was celebrated at the Basilica di San Martino on 11 October.

When she was three, the Berettas relocated to Bergamo, where she grew up. She made her First Communion on 4 April 1928 and her Confirmation in the Bergamo Cathedral on 9 June 1930 from Monsignor Luigi Maria Marelli. The Berettas moved to Genoa following her sister Amalia's death in 1937 and sought residence in the Quinto al Mare neighbourhood, where she attended school. She was an active participant in the parish of Saint Peter, and Archbishop Mario Righetti had an active role in her spiritual formation until the Berettas returned to Bergamo in October 1941 to live with her maternal grandparents at San Vigilio. From 16 to 18 March 1938, she made the Spiritual Exercises of Saint Ignatius, but 1938 to 1939 saw a suspension in her studies when she was in ill health.

In 1942, she began her studies in medicine in Milan. Outside of her schooling, she was active in the Azione Cattolica (Catholic Action) movement. Beretta received a medical diploma on 30 November 1949 from the Pavia college and in 1950, she opened an office in Mesero, close to her hometown, where she specialised in paediatrics. Beretta hoped to join her brother Giuseppe, a priest in the Brazilian missions, where she intended to offer gynaecological services to poor women, but her chronic ill health made this impractical. Instead, she continued her practice. Beginning 7 July 1952, she specialised in paediatrics at the University of Milan.

In December 1954, she met Pietro Molla (1912 – 3 April 2010), an engineer, and the two became engaged the following 11 April. The pair later married on 24 September 1955 at the Basilica di San Martino, in Magenta. The pair visited Saint Peter's Square as part of their honeymoon. Molla gave birth to four children:

- Pierluigi (b. 19 November 1956)
- Mariolina (11 December 1957 – 12 February 1964)
- Laura (b. 15 July 1959)
- Gianna (b. 21 April 1962)

In 1961, during the second month of her fourth and final pregnancy, Molla developed a fibroma on her uterus. The doctors gave her three choices following an examination: an abortion, a complete hysterectomy, or the removal of the fibroma alone.

Molla opted for the removal of the fibroma since she wanted to preserve her child's life. She told the doctors that her child's life was more important than her own. On the morning of Holy Saturday, 21 April 1962, Molla was sent to the hospital where her fourth child, Gianna Emanuela, was delivered via a Caesarean section. But Molla continued to have severe pain and died of septic peritonitis one week after giving birth, on the morning of Easter Saturday, 28 April. As of 2017, her daughter Gianna Emanuela is a doctor of geriatrics.

Her husband wrote a biographical account of her life in April 1971 and dedicated it to his children. He often told Gianna Emanuela that her mother's choice was one of conscience as both a loving mother and a doctor.

== Beatification process ==
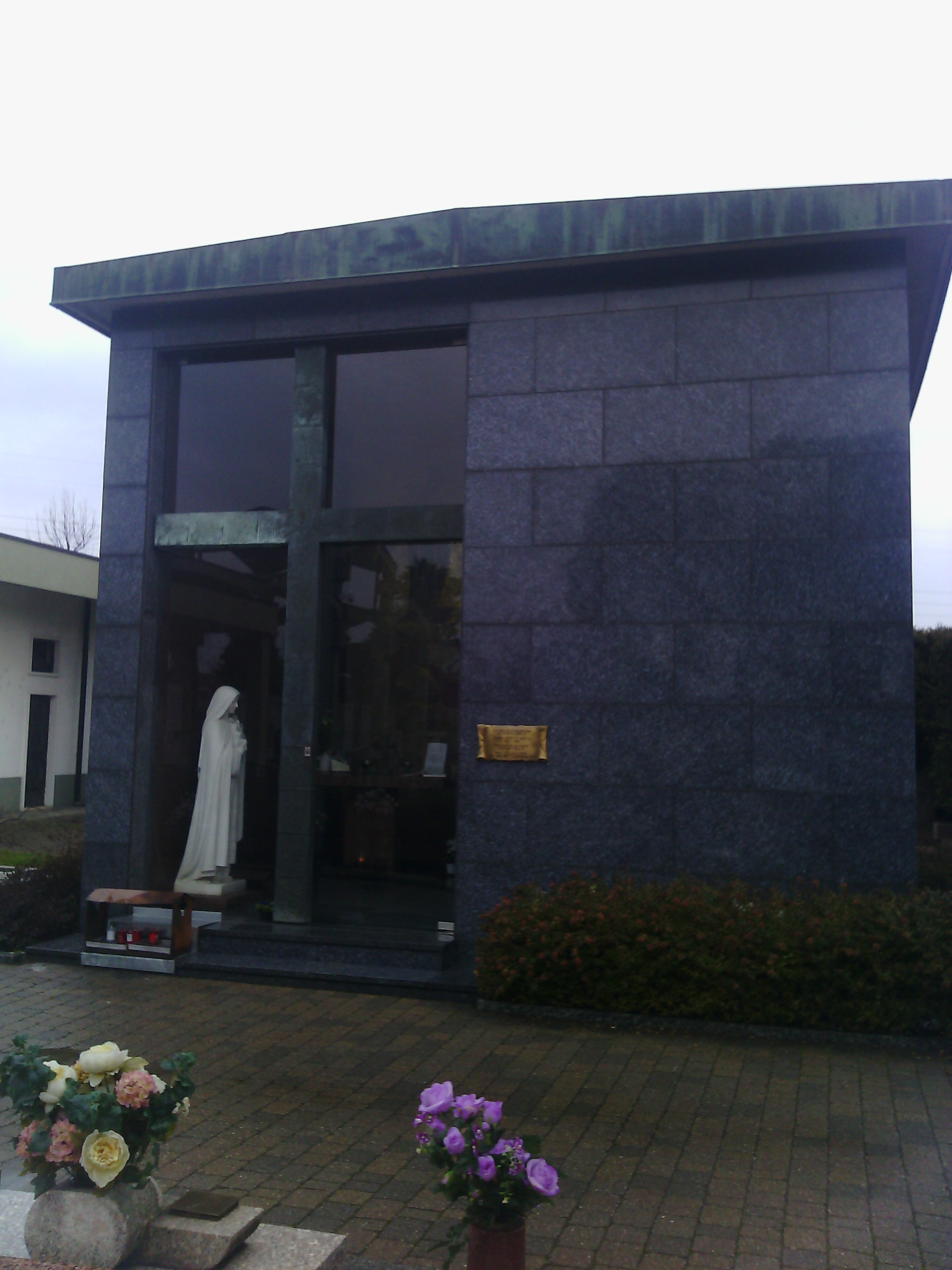
The Mausoleum where Molla's tomb is located

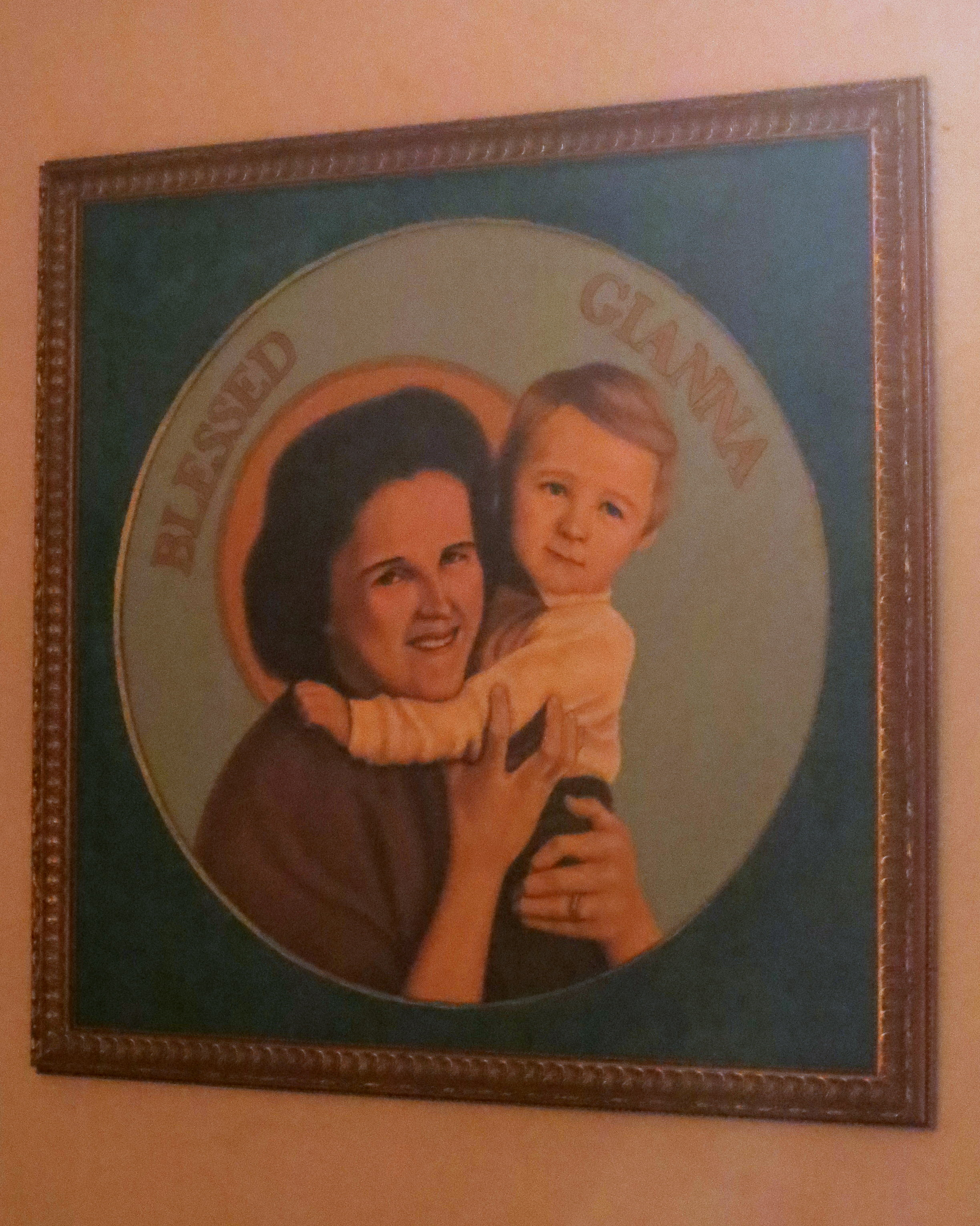
Ceiling mularal in Saint Patrick in Columbus, Ohio)

The Cardinal Archbishop of Milan Giovanni Colombo promoted the opening of a beatification cause on 6 November 1972 and it took a step forward on 11 April 1978 when Colombo and sixteen other bishops filed a petition to Pope Paul VI asking for him to initiate the process.

The beatification process was opened under Pope John Paul II on 15 March 1980, and Molla became titled as a Servant of God. Carlo Maria Martini presided over the cognitional process of investigation from 30 June 1980 until 21 March 1986, at which stage all documents were sent to Rome for inspection. The Congregation for the Causes of Saints were convinced the process had been completed to an appropriate degree and issued a decree of validation for the cognitional process on 14 November 1986. The postulation submitted the Positio dossier to the CCS later in 1989, after which a team of theologians assessed and approved it on 14 December 1990. The CCS soon followed on 18 June 1991. Molla became titled as venerable on 6 July 1991 after John Paul II confirmed that she had lived a life of heroic virtue.

A miracle attributed to Molla's intercession was investigated in Grajaú in Brazil from 30 November 1981 until 15 January 1982. Two additional supplementary processes were also held during this time, with the first spanning from 30 October 1986 to November 1986, and the other from 8 August 1987 until 2 November 1987. The Congregation for the Causes of Saints issued its decree of validation at the closure of these three investigations on 27 September 1991. The members confirmed the findings of these two bodies on 17 November 1992. John Paul II issued his approval of this healing on 21 December 1992, and beatified Molla on 24 April 1994.

The closure of the investigation of a second miracle saw documents sent to the Congregation, who validated the process on 22 February 2002. John Paul II granted the final approval on 20 December 2003, and formalisation came at an ordinary consistory held on 19 February 2004. Molla was canonised in Saint Peter's Square on 16 May 2004. Molla's husband and their children were present at the canonisation. It was the first time that a husband had ever witnessed his former wife's canonisation.

=== Miracles ===
The miracle that led to her beatification involved a Protestant Brazilian woman, Lucia Sylvia Cirilo who gave birth to a stillborn child on 22 October 1977. Cirilo was discharged from the hospital, but began suffering from severe pains within a week that forced her brother to take her to the Saint Francis of Assisi hospital in Grajaú, Maranhão on 9 November. The doctors found an unseen complication that caused a rectal-vaginal fistula, one that the hospital was not equipped to treat. She was told that she would need to be moved to the hospital at São Luís, but she believed that she would not survive the trip there. One of the nurses, Sister Bernardina de Manaus, was so distressed about this that she appealed for the intercession of Molla while looking at a small picture of her. The nun asked two other nurses to follow her lead, and the group soon discovered that Cirilo's pain had disappeared, leaving the doctors amazed at the fact that the fistula had healed in full.

The miracle that led to Molla's canonisation involved another Brazilian Catholic woman, Elizabeth Comparini Arcolino. She was sixteen weeks pregnant in 2000 when she sustained a tear in her placenta that drained her womb of all amniotic fluid. Her doctors told her that the child's chances of survival were impossible because she was too early in her pregnancy. Arcolino said she appealed to the then-Blessed Molla, asking for her intercession and was able to carry to 32 weeks and deliver her child in perfect health.

== Legacies ==
The late Molla's example was hailed as courageous by Catholics after her death. Pope Paul VI hailed her protection and love of life in his Angelus address on 23 September 1973.

Gianna Beretta Molla is the inspiration behind the Gianna Center in New York, the first Catholic health care center for women in New York dedicated to pro-life beliefs. Saint Gianna Beretta Molla is also the eponym of Saint Gianna's Maternity Home in Warsaw, North Dakota.

In September 2015, the saint's daughter, Gianna Emanuela Molla, read a letter before Pope Francis during the 2015 World Meeting of Families in Philadelphia. The letter, which her mother wrote to her father not long before their marriage, highlighted the Christian virtues of marriage and called him and herself as a couple to serve God in a "saintly way" through what she called "the sacrament of love".

On All Saints Day, 2019, Gianna Emanuela Molla was the featured guest at the University of Mary's Candlelight Gala and granted permission (on behalf of the Molla family) for the university to name its flagship School of Health Sciences after her mother, entrusting the students and faculty to St. Gianna as patroness.
