= St. Stanislaus Church Historic District =

Historic church in North Dakota, United States

- U.S. National Register of Historic Places
- U.S. Historic district
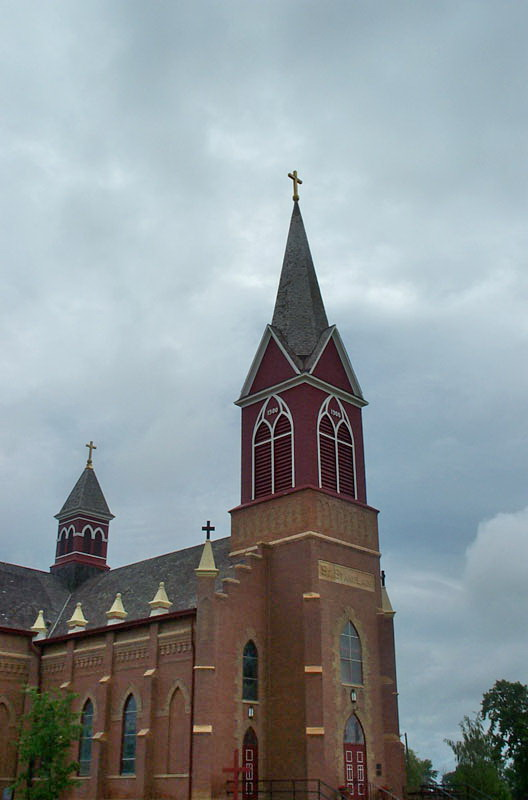

- Location within North Dakota Location within the United States
- Location: Off I-29, Warsaw, North Dakota
- Coordinates: 48°17′41″N 97°15′11″W
- Area: 11.2 acres (4.5 ha)
- Built: 1892
- Architect: Ross, John W.; et al.
- Architectural style: Gothic Revival
- NRHP reference No.: 79001776
- Added to NRHP: August 3, 1979

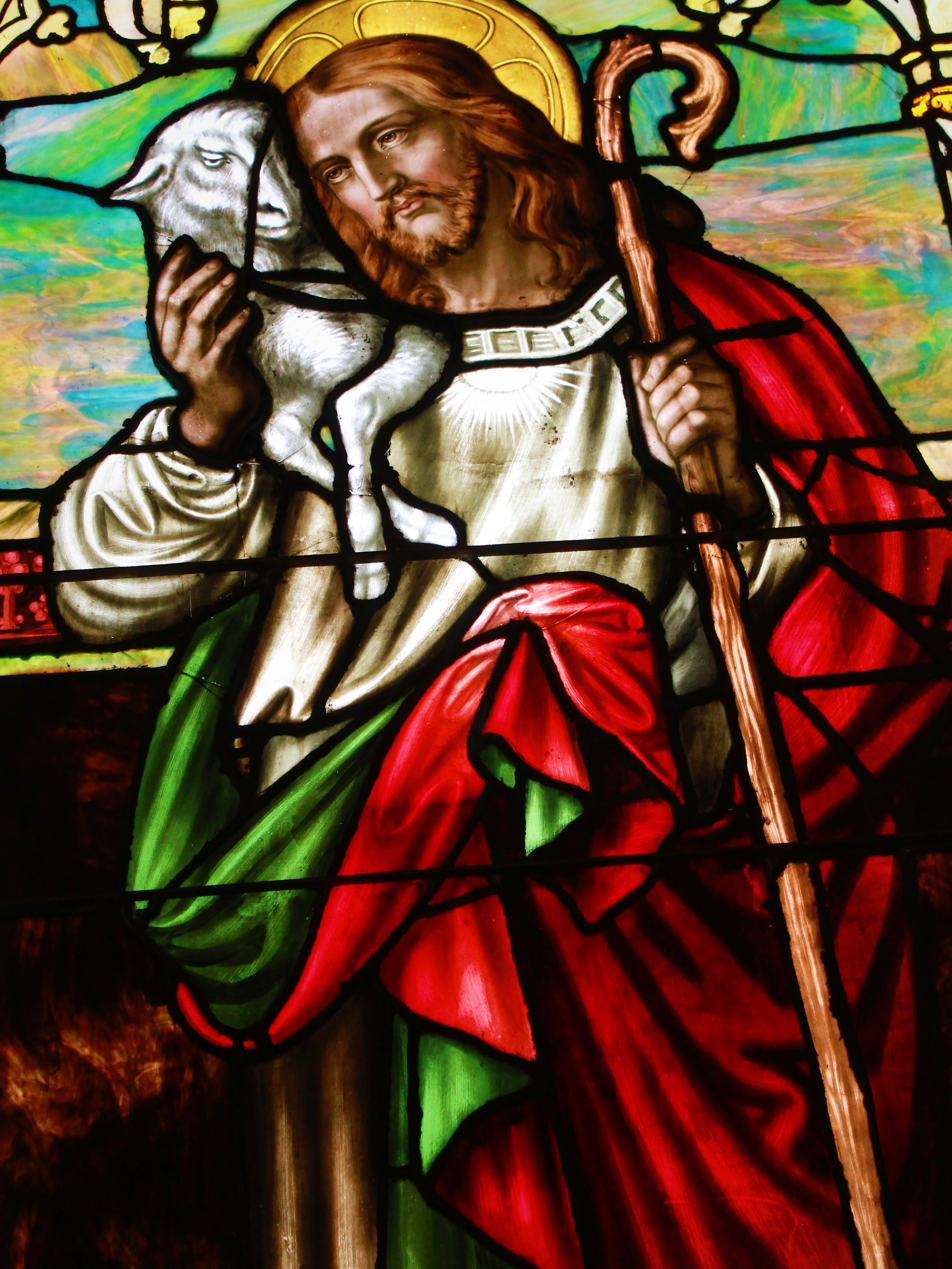
Stained Glass Window in the Saint Stanislaus Catholic Church

The St. Stanislaus Church Historic District is a 11.2 acres (4.5 ha) Polish American historic district in Warsaw, North Dakota, United States, that was listed on the National Register of Historic Places in 1979.

The St. Stanislaus Church was designed by John W. Ross and was dedicated in 1901.

As of 1979, the historic district included three contributing buildings: the St. Stanislaus Church, a rectory, and St. Anthony Academy, and one contributing site, a cemetery.
