= Battle of Artenay =

Battle of the Franco-Prussian War

- Part of Franco-Prussian War
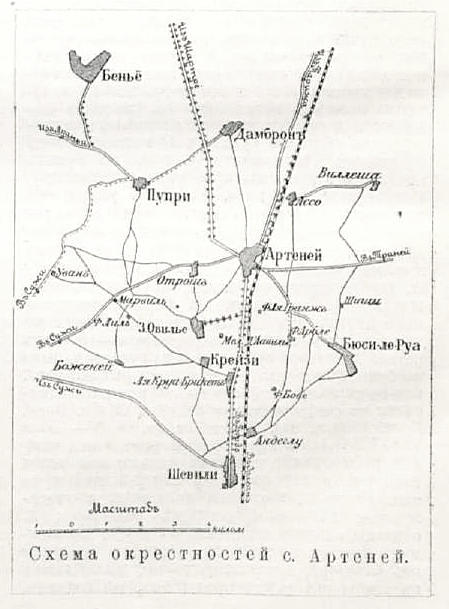
- Map of the Battle Plans
| Date | 10 October 1870 |
| Location | Artenay, Loiret, France |
| Result | German victory |

Belligerents
| French Republic | North German Confederation: Prussia; Bavaria |

Commanders and leaders
| Joseph Édouard de la Motte-Rouge | Ludwig von Tann-Rathsamhausen |

Units involved
| Garde Mobile | XI Corps; I Corps |

Strength
| 20,000 men | 30,000 men |

Casualties and losses
| 700 killed or wounded 1,800 captured | 1,000 killed or wounded |

The Battle of Artenay also known as the Battle of Arthenay, took place during the Franco-Prussian War, on 10 October 1870, in Artenay a small town located on the road from Orléans to Paris, France which was about 10 miles north of the city of Orléans. In this fierce battle, with superior strength compared to the opponent, The I Corps of the Kingdom of Bavaria, under the command of Lieutenant General Ludwig von der Tann-Rathsamhausen, in collaboration with the 22nd Division of the XI Corps of the Kingdom of Prussia and the two cavalry divisions of the Prussian army attacked and penetrated the defense system of the army of the Loire of the young French Republic, under the control of general Joseph Edouard de la Motterouge, causing heavy losses for the French military of which many people were taken prisoner. The winning conditions Artenay were favorable enough for Von der Tann to strike Orléans, while the forces of France knocked back on Orléans forest in an agitated state. Despite this, Nièvre's Garde Mobiles and the Pontifical Legion in the French army were noted for their strong resistance, while a monk in Prussian Cavalry under the command of Prince Albrecht demonstrated his prowess in the battle at Artenay.

== The Battle ==
When General von der Tann was ordered to launch an offensive campaign against Orléans, he marched on 9 October 1870 to the vicinity of St. Péravy and encountered no significant resistance (instead it was flimsy and languid resistance), and on 10 October he marched on Artenay. The Prussian 4th Cavalry Division covered the right flank, while the 2nd Cavalry Division under Lieutenant General Count zu Stolberg remained close to Pithivier. Meanwhile, General de la Motto-Rouge, informed of the German advance, drew a small force to Artenay. As a result, the vanguard forces of both sides clashed not far north of their common objective. The French Chasseurs de Vincennes were taken by surprise, and they held out until the Prussian cavalry was reinforced by infantry and formed a strong front forcing the French to retreat to Bas-le-Roy. General Regau commanded a French division that responded, increasing the number of French troops. The Prussians at that time were already in a favorable defensive position, and the French made several massive attacks on this position several times. But the guns of the Germans demonstrated their power and the French were driven back to the Trinay plain. The Prussian Armored Cavalry pursued the enemy, but had to retreat as the French regrouped. There was fierce artillery fire between Regau's battery and the Prussian artillery in the middle of St. Germain-le-Gramal and Trinay, and later the French were reinforced. They again attempted to attack the Prussian lines, but failed. Soon, while the Germans attacked fiercely with firepower that terrified the French, a strong German cavalry force encircled the French right flank with La Motto-Rouge's legion disintegrated, and had to flee. The German cavalry also obtained a number of artillery pieces.

The railway station was destroyed by Prussian artillery. Following the Prussian-Bavarian victory at Artenay, the First Battle of Orléans broke out the next day, 11 October 1870. By mid-day, Von der Tann's army had smashed the French defenders and captured Orléans. Léon Gambetta demanded that La Motto-Rouge be brought before a military tribunal, but this was denied, General Louis d'Aurelle de Paladines was appointed commander of the Legion of Loire.
