= Minto School =

- U.S. National Register of Historic Places
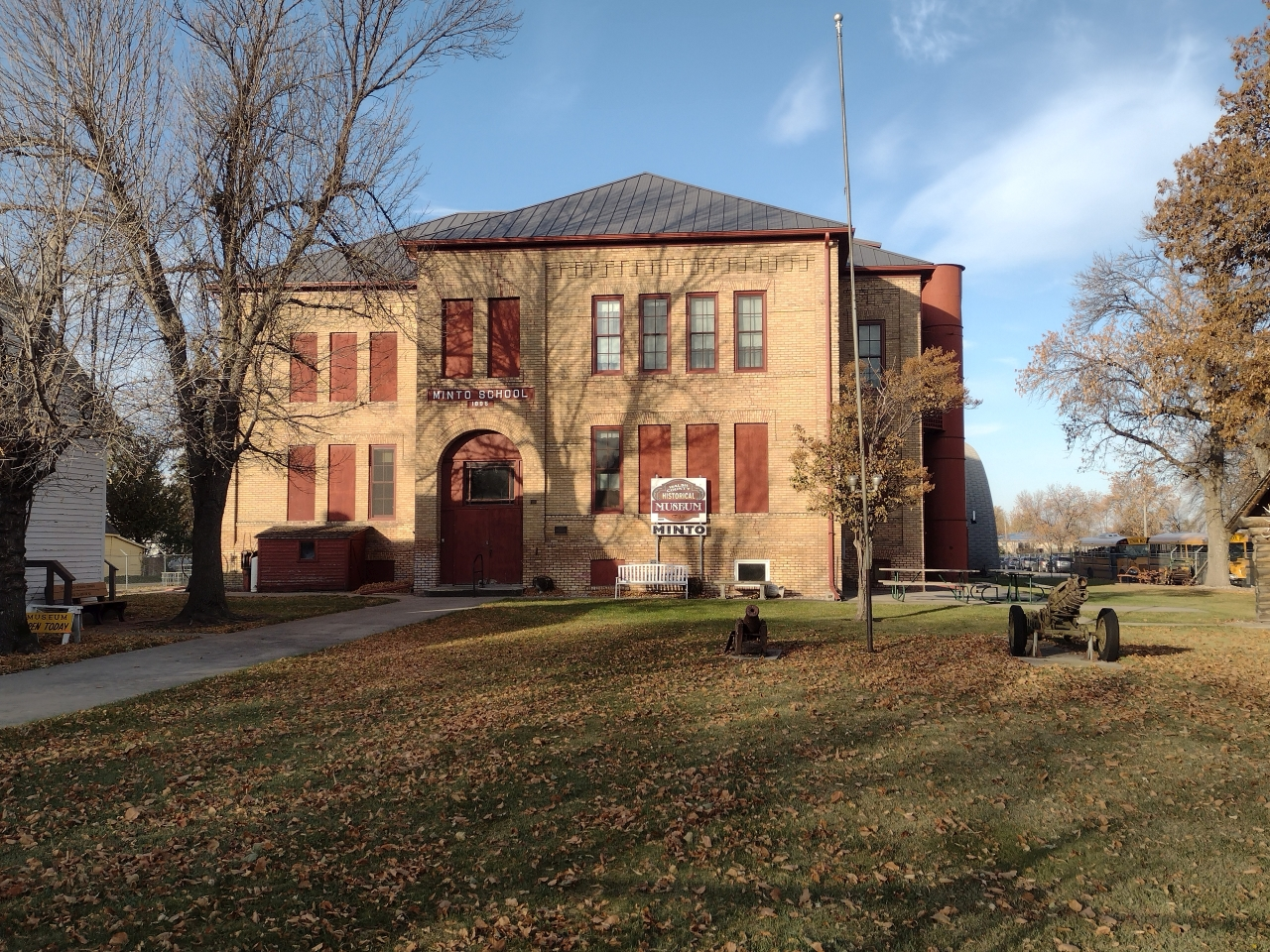

- Location within North Dakota Location within the United States
- Location: Jct. of Major Ave. and Third St., Minto, North Dakota
- Coordinates: 48°17′36″N 97°22′26″W
- Area: less than one acre
- Built: 1895
- Architect: Multiple
- Architectural style: Queen Anne, Romanesque
- NRHP reference No.: 91002002
- Added to NRHP: January 30, 1992

The Minto School at Major Ave. and Third St. in Minto, North Dakota was built in 1895. It has also been known as the Walsh County Historical Society Museum. It was listed on the National Register of Historic Places in 1992.

== See also ==
- Photo at NSUC Institute for Regional Studies
