= St. Joseph's Chapel (Minto, North Dakota) =

Historic church in North Dakota, United States

- U.S. National Register of Historic Places
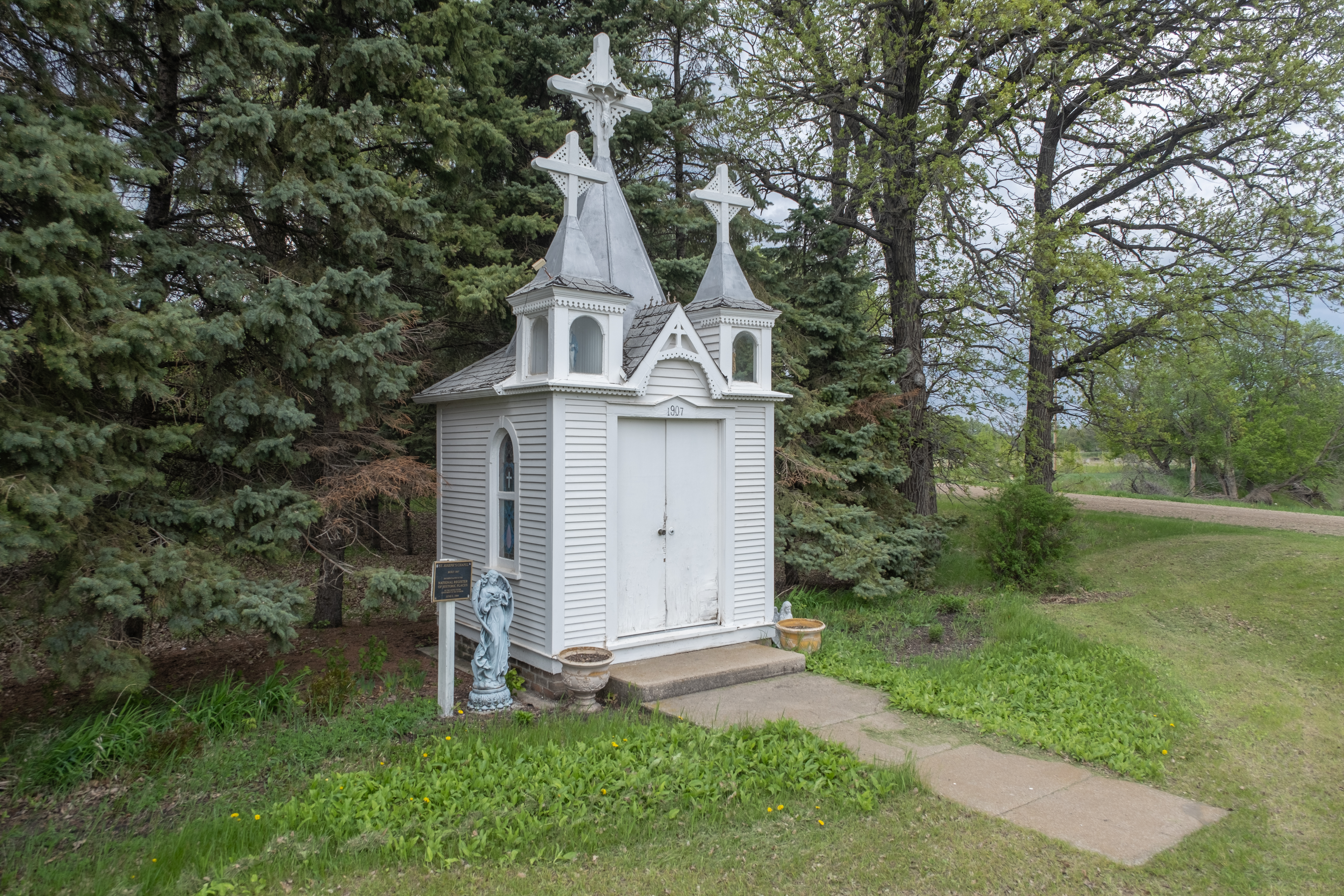

- Location within North Dakota Location within the United States
- Nearest city: Minto, North Dakota
- Coordinates: 48°18′35″N 97°8′42″W
- Area: less than one acre
- Built: 1907
- Built by: Kosmatka, Joseph
- Architectural style: Stick/Eastlake, Colonial Revival, Late Gothic Revival
- NRHP reference No.: 94000556
- Added to NRHP: June 2, 1994

The St. Joseph's Chapel in Minto, North Dakota, United States, includes Stick/Eastlake, Colonial Revival, and Late Gothic Revival architecture. It was built in 1907. It was listed on the National Register of Historic Places in 1994.

It is a wayside shrine, exemplifying that type of Polish immigrant construction.
