= Ferenc Gyulay =

Hungarian noble

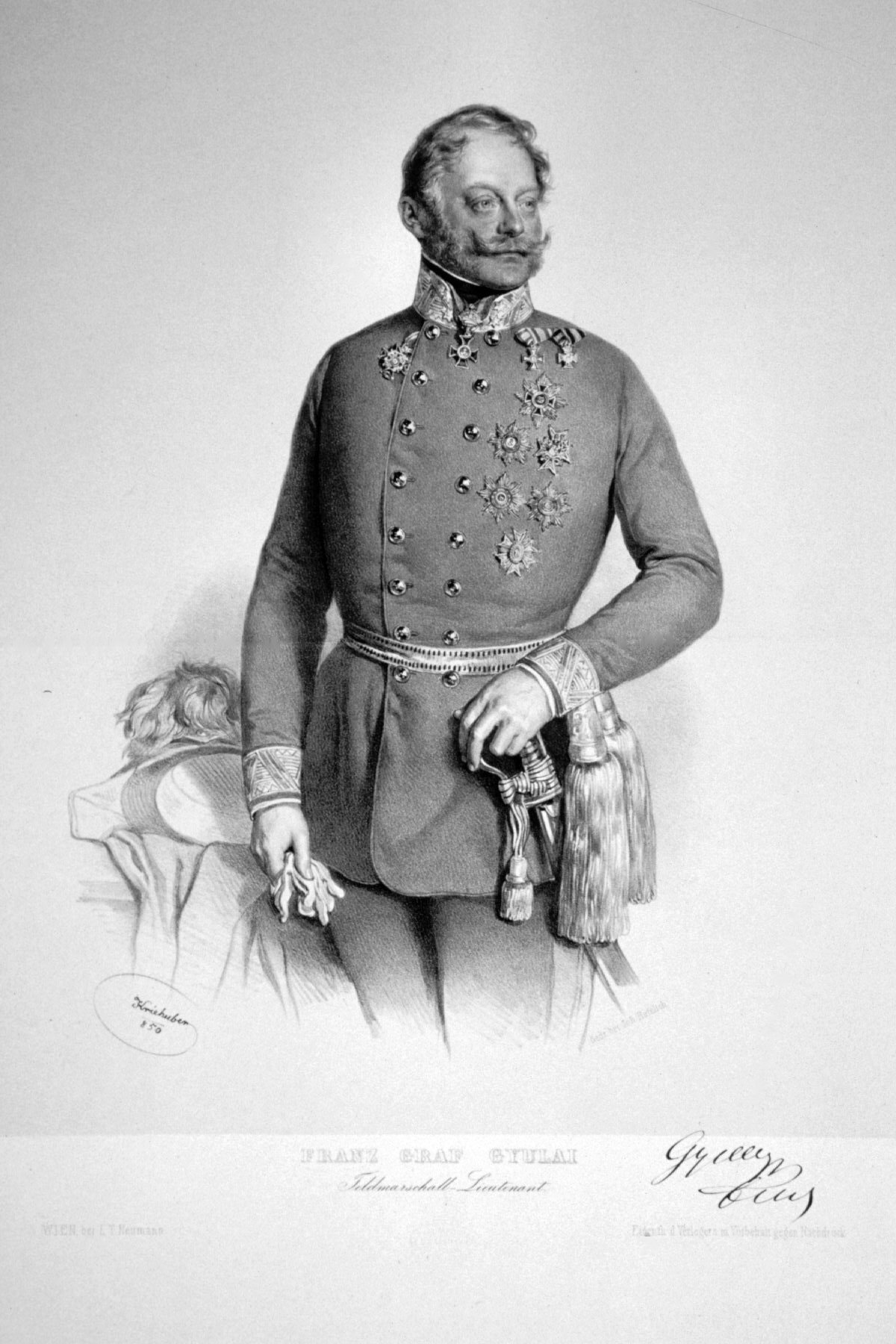
- Ferenc József Gyulay, 1850
- Born: 1 September 1799; Pest, Kingdom of Hungary
- Died: 1 September 1868 (aged 69); Vienna, Austria-Hungary
- Military career
- Allegiance: Austrian Empire
- Service years: 1816–1859
- Rank: Feldzeugmeister
- Conflicts: First Italian War of Independence; Second Italian War of Independence

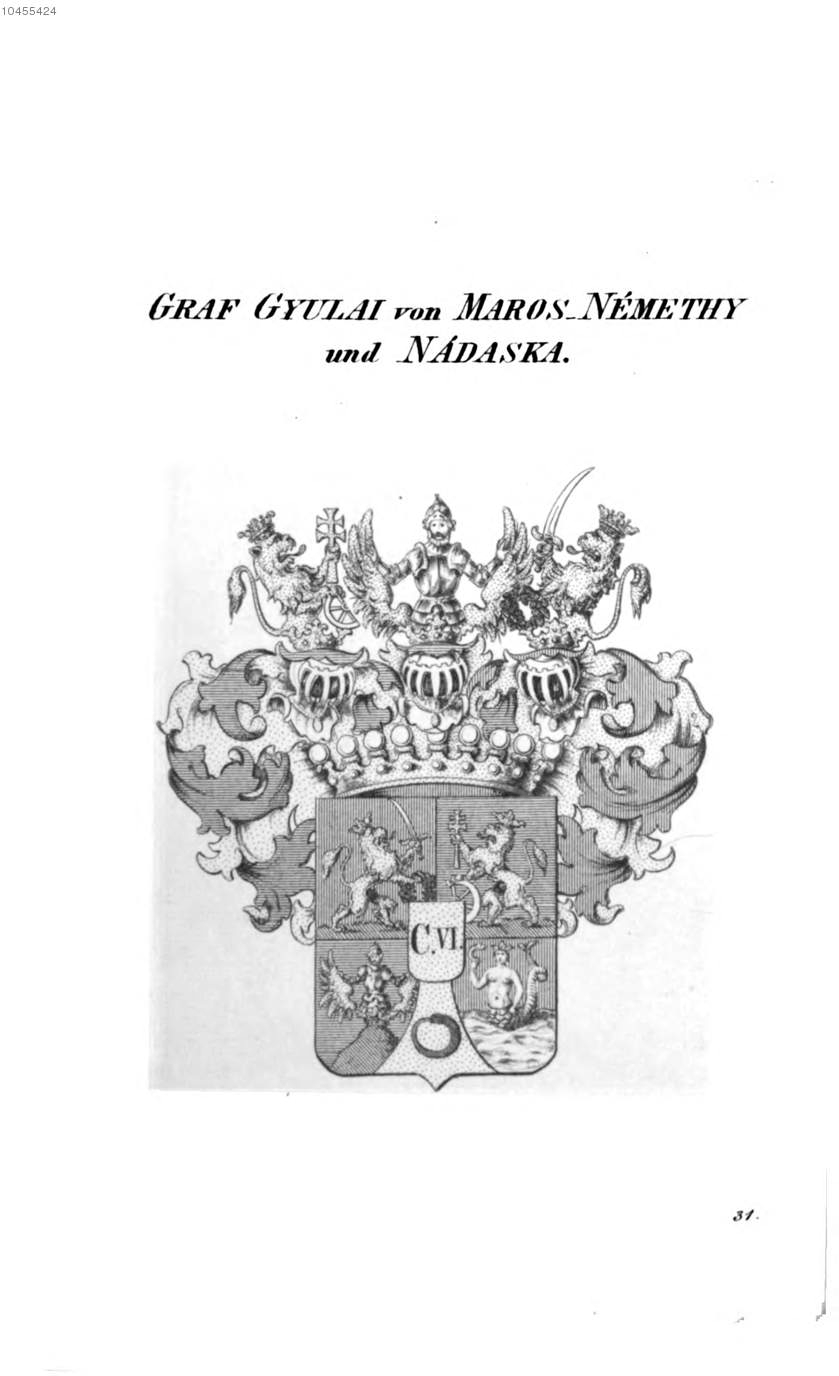
Arms of the Count Gyulay von Maros-Németh und Nádaska

Count Ferenc Gyulay de Marosnémethi et Nádaska (Hungarian pronunciation: [ˈfɛrɛnts ˈɟulɒji], 1 September 1799 – 1 September 1868), also known as Ferencz Gyulai, Ferencz Gyulaj, or Franz Gyulai, was a Hungarian nobleman who served as Austrian Governor of Lombardy-Venetia and commanded the losing Austrian army at the Battle of Magenta.

== Biography ==
Gyulay was born on 1 September 1799 in Pest, Hungary to Count Ignác Gyulay von Maros-Németh und Nádaska and his wife, Baroness Maria von Edelsheim.

At the age of seventeen in 1816 he served as a leutnant in the 60th "Ignác Gyulay" infantry battalion. In 1820 he was transferred to the Hesse-Homburg hussar brigade as an oberleutnant and just a year after he was promoted to hauptmann of the Imperial uhlans. In 1826 he was appointed the head of the Württemberg hussar brigade and soon after in 1829 he became the oberstleutnant of the Hesse-Homburg infantry. In 1831 he was promoted to the rank of oberst and in 1838 to generalmajor. In 1846 he was already the generalleutnant of the 33rd infantry battalion. In 1847 he was the abteilungsführer and military captain of the vicinity of Triest.

Gyulay's first war-time assignment came in 1848 when the Revolutions of 1848 broke out. First he had to face the Italian states' menace at Pola. He had to defend the imperial fleet stationed in Pola of being seized by its insurgent crew. He immediately relieved the Italian-born sailors of their duties and warned the ships already in sail to do the same. He put the cities of Triest and Pola on defense, armed the ships and filled up their missing Italian crew with people from the local commercial ships. He organized an ad hoc boat squadron as well. Gyulay regrouped the troops retreating from Venice at Isonzo. His efforts prevented a joint Napolitan-Sardinian fleet from ambushing the key ports in the Istria. The Battle of Custoza eased the pressure on the Adriatic coast and Gyulay's precautionary measures secured the area.

In 1849 Gyulay had been promoted to the rank of lieutenant general (Feldmarschallleutnant) and that summer was named Austrian Minister of Defense by Emperor Franz Joseph and thus he was involved in Hungarian Revolution of 1848 on the Habsburg side. He was at the siege of Raab on 28 June followed by the Battle of Komárom, which he left in the early stages due at least in part to the tendency of the emperor and his adjutant general Grünne to bypass his ministry when making military decisions. He was moved to Milan to take charge of the 5th army division.

In 1857, following the resignation of Joseph Radetzky, Gyulay was named Governor of Lombardy-Venetia, residing at Milan.

In early 1859, the Kingdom of Sardinia/Piedmont, having allied with France, began mobilizing its army, possibly in preparation for an invasion of Italian territories controlled by Austria. On 23 April, Austria issued an ultimatum to the Sardinians, demanding they demobilize. When the Sardinians refused, the Second Italian War of Independence began.

As commander of Austrian forces in Northern Italy, Count Gyulay, now with the rank of feldzeugmeister, was ordered to cross the Ticino River on 29 April, the border between Austrian and Sardinian territory. In response, French forces under Patrice MacMahon were dispatched to defend their Sardinian allies. On 20 May, an Austrian force under Count Stadion was defeated at the Battle of Montebello, after which Gyulay retreated back into Austrian territory. He then suffered another defeat at the Battle of Palestro.

The French army then crossed the Ticino into Austrian territory and captured the village of Boffalora sopra Ticino after a small battle. Finally, on 4 June, the main Austrian and French armies met at the Battle of Magenta. The Austrians under Gyulay were defeated, leading to his recall to Vienna. Emperor Franz Josef took personal command of the Austrian army in Lombardy-Venetia, and would go on to lose the subsequent Battle of Solferino. In one of his last military engagements he was reduced to a Regimentskommandeur and is sent to defend Mantua from the Piedmontese invasion. Unsuccessful in doing so he surrendered the city in 1866 eventually leading to its annexation to the newly formed Italy.

Gyulay died on his birthday in Vienna, Austria.

== Sources ==
- Deak, Istvan. Beyond Nationalism: A Social & Political History of the Habsburg Officer Corps 1848–1918. Oxford University Press, 1990. ISBN 0-19-504505-X.
- Morris, Charles. One Hundred Years of Conflict Between the Nations of Europe: The Causes and Issues of the Great War. The John C. Winston Company, Philadelphia, PA, 1914.
