= Battle of Magenta =

Battle of the Second Italian War of Independence

- Part of the Second Italian War of Independence
- Battle of Magenta, 4 June 1859 by Adolphe Yvon, 1860–1863
Date	4 June 1859
Location	Magenta, Austrian Empire (present-day Italy) 45°27′22″N 8°48′7″E
Result	Franco-Italian victory

Belligerents
France (Kingdom of Sardinia) Sardinia	(Austrian Empire) Austria

Commanders and leaders
(Second French Empire) Napoleon III (Second French Empire) Patrice de MacMahon	(Austrian Empire) Ferenc Gyulay (Austrian Empire) Prince of Montenuovo

Strength
49,945 infantry 1,207 cavalry 87 guns	58,183 infantry 3,435 cavalry 152 guns

Casualties and losses
707 killed 3,223 wounded 655 missing Total: 4,585	1,368 killed 4,358 wounded 4,500 missing Total: 10,226

The Battle of Magenta (Italian pronunciation: [maˈdʒenta]) was fought on 4 June 1859 near the town of Magenta in the Kingdom of Lombardy–Venetia, a crown land of the Austrian Empire, during the Second Italian War of Independence. It resulted in a French-Sardinian victory under Napoleon III against the Austrians under Marshal Ferenc Gyulay. Napoleon III's army crossed the Ticino River and outflanked the Austrian right forcing the Austrian army under Gyulay to retreat. The confined nature of the country, a vast spread of orchards cut up by streams and irrigation canals, precluded elaborate manoeuvre. The Austrians turned every house into a miniature fortress. The brunt of the fighting was borne by 5,000 grenadiers of the French Imperial Guard, still mostly in their First Empire style of uniforms. The battle of Magenta was not a particularly large battle, but it was a decisive victory for the Franco-Sardinian alliance. Patrice de MacMahon was created Duke of Magenta for his role in this battle, and would later go on to serve as President of the French Third Republic.

== Prelude to battle ==
From 1 June through 3 June, the French and Piedmontese pursued the Austrian 2nd Army to the Ticino River, the border between Lombardy and Piedmont. The Austrians set up a defensive position at Magenta, utilizing the Naviglio Grande, which could be crossed only at four bridges. Gyulay had available 68,000 men, composed of the I, II, III and VII Korps. The French had about 50,000 men, while Manfredo Fanti added another 12,000. Camou had crossed the Ticino during the Battle of Turbigo, followed by MacMahon. MacMahon, Camou and Espinasse crossed the canal on bridges at Bernate Ticino and Boffalora sopra Ticino, placing them north of Magenta.

== Battle ==
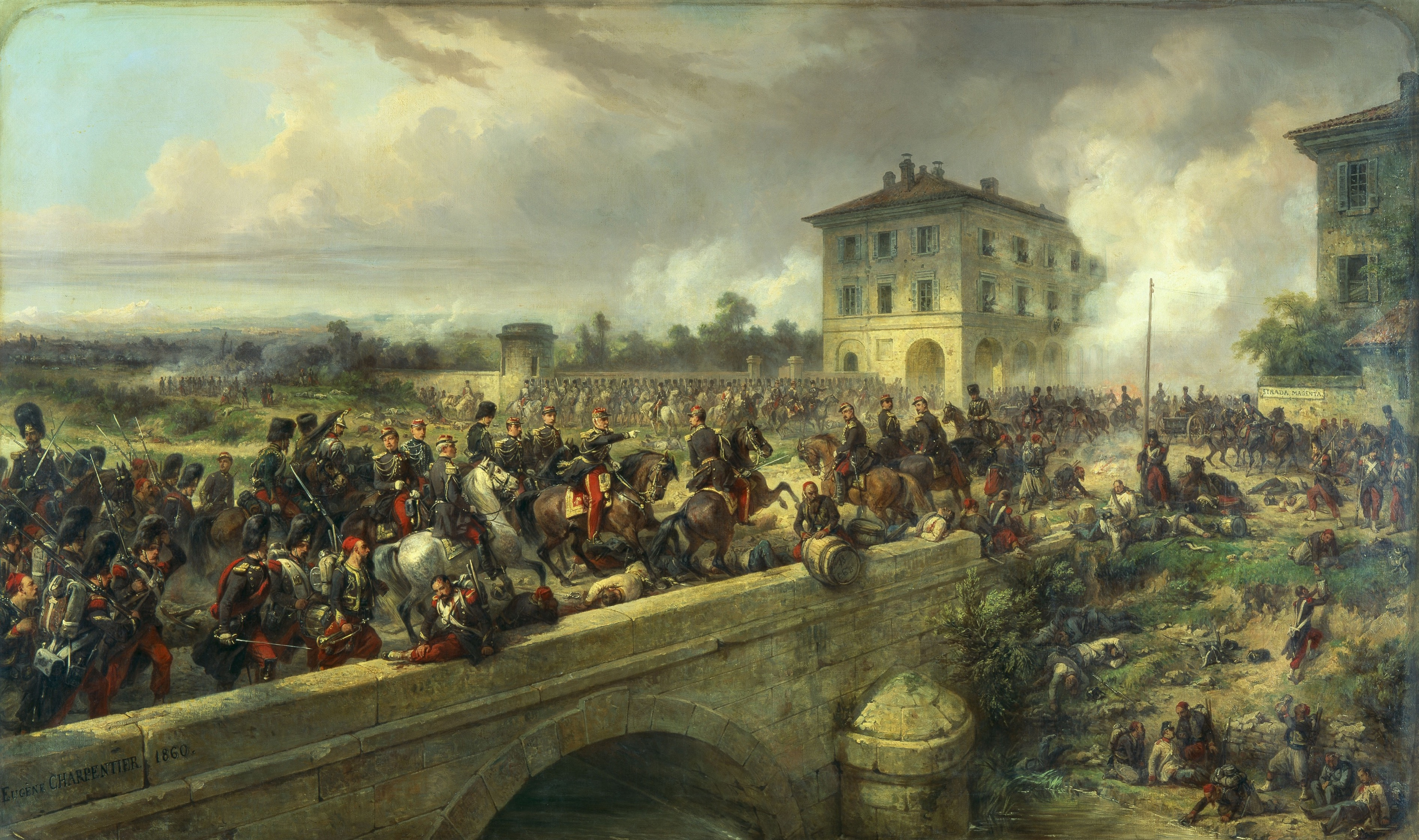
La Garde impériale à Magenta, le 4 juin 1859, oil on canvas by Eugène-Louis Charpentier, 1860

At noon, MacMahon encountered elements of Liechtenstein's II Korps. The Imperial Guard Corps made contact with the Austrians from Buffalora to Magenta. At 2pm, the Guard Zouaves crossed the canal with boats, establishing a bridgehead. Eduard Clam-Gallas informed Gyulay of the French attack, who sent Schwarzenberg's III Korps from Robecco sul Naviglio, threatening the French right flank. Canrobert arrived in time to reinforce the Guard. From 3.30 through 5.30pm, MacMahon launched an attack against the Austrian I and II Korps. By 6.30pm the Austrians began a fighting withdrawal, while the French advanced into Magenta and beyond. By 10pm, the Austrian 2nd Army was withdrawing toward Abbiategrasso.

== Aftermath ==
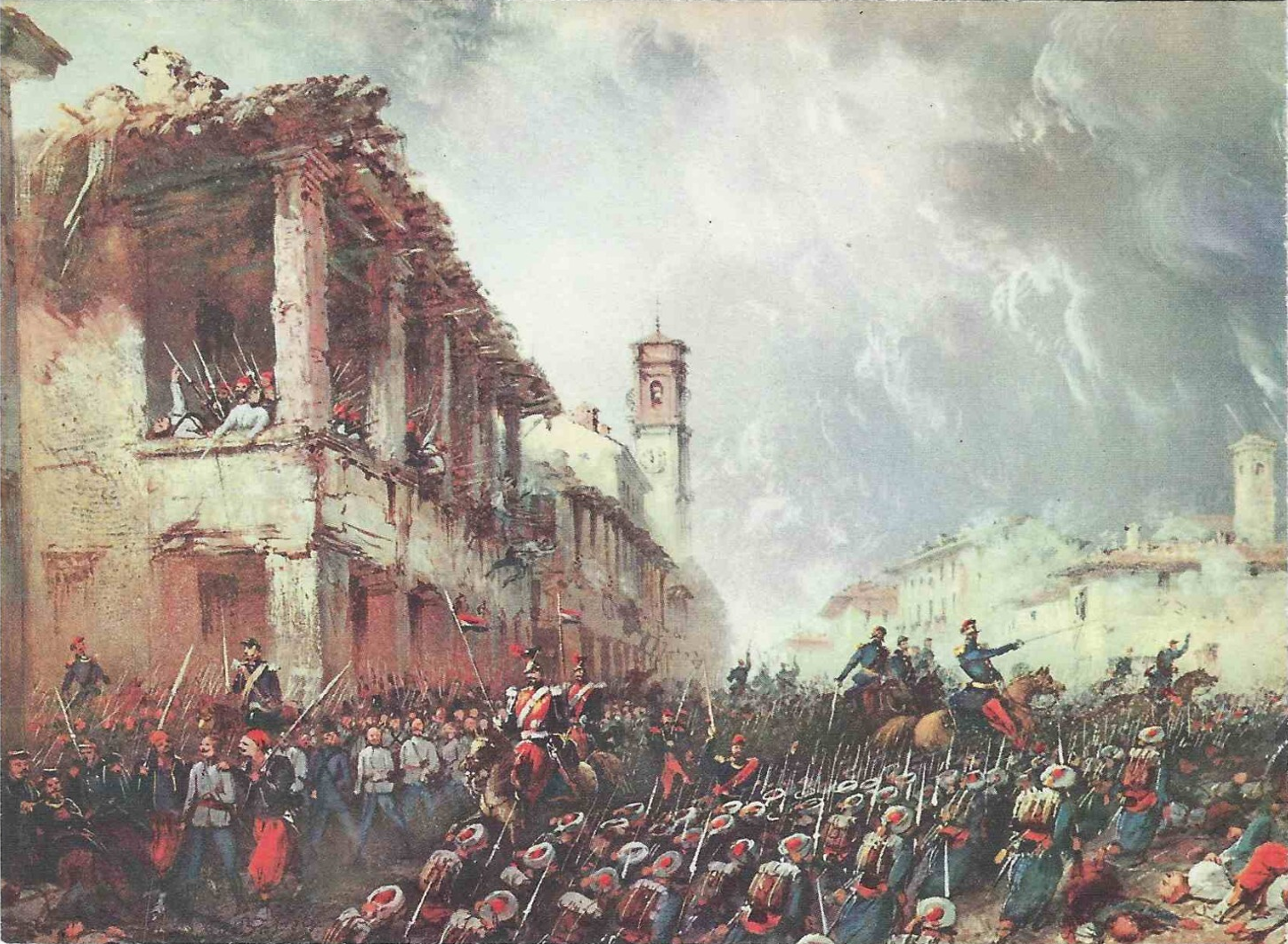
The Battle of Magenta by Carlo Bossoli, 1859

On 8 June, Napoleon III and Victor Emmanuel II entered Milan, then Brescia a few days later. On 23–25 May, Prince Napoléon Bonaparte's V Corps landed at Livorno, and then entered Florence a week later, followed by Parma, and Modena.

According to Frederick Schneid, "The defeat at Magenta spelled the end for Gyulay. He withdrew his army to the Chiese River east of Milan, and resigned on June 16."

== Legacy ==
A dye producing the colour magenta was discovered in 1859, and was named after this battle (apocryphally, because it matched the colour of the blood-stained red trousers of the French soldiers' uniforms), as was the Boulevard de Magenta in Paris.
