= Eugène Charpentier =

French painter

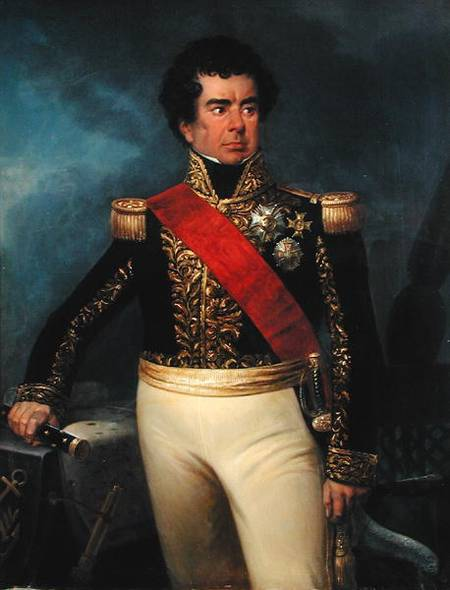
Guy-Victor Duperré.

Eugène-Louis Charpentier (1 June 1811 – 16 December 1890) was a French painter. He studied under Gérard and Cogniet, and became celebrated as a painter of historical pictures. These were frequently battle-scenes, some of which are at Versailles. He was also a portrait painter, and one of his most successful works was a likeness of George Sand, painted in 1839. His 'Pupils of the Ecole Polytechnique at the Battle of Paris, March 30, 1814,' which was exhibited in 1852, is now in the Museum of Boulogne-sur-Mer. He died in 1880.
