= Minto, North Dakota =

- City
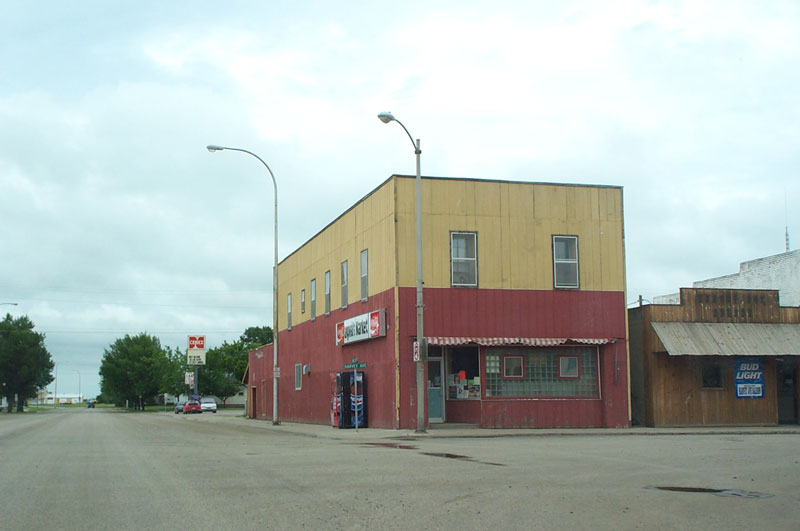
- Minto, North Dakota

- Location of Minto, North Dakota. (The upper map is the state of North Dakota with Walsh County in red; the lower map is Walsh County with Minto in red.)
- Coordinates: 48°17′33″N 97°22′23″W
- Country: United States
- State: North Dakota
- County: Walsh
- Founded: 1881

Area
  - Total: 1.44 sq mi (3.72 km^{2})
  - Land: 1.44 sq mi (3.72 km^{2})
  - Water: 0 sq mi (0.00 km^{2})
- Elevation: 823 ft (251 m)

Population (2020)
  - Total: 616
  - Estimate (2022): 615
  - Density: 428.6/sq mi (165.47/km^{2})
- Time zone: UTC-6 (Central (CST))
  - Summer (DST): UTC-5 (CDT)
- ZIP code: 58261
- Area code: 701
- FIPS code: 38-53540
- GNIS feature ID: 1036166
- Website: cityofminto.com

Minto is a city in Walsh County, North Dakota, United States. The population was 616 at the 2020 census. Minto was founded in 1881.

== History ==
A post office has been in operation at Minto since 1880. Minto was incorporated in 1883. The city was named after Minto, Ontario, the native home of a large share of the early settlers. The St. Joseph's Chapel was built by Polish immigrants in 1907.

== Geography ==
According to the United States Census Bureau, the city has a total area of 1.42 square miles (3.68 km^{2}).

== Demographics ==
Historical population
Census	Pop.	Note	%±
1890	467		—
1900	860		84.2%
1910	701		−18.5%
1920	602		−14.1%
1930	565		−6.1%
1940	630		11.5%
1950	592		−6.0%
1960	642		8.4%
1970	636		−0.9%
1980	592		−6.9%
1990	560		−5.4%
2000	657		17.3%
2010	604		−8.1%
2020	616		2.0%
2022 (est.)	615		−0.2%
U.S. Decennial Census; 2020 Census

=== 2010 census ===
As of the census of 2010, there were 604 people, 255 households, and 173 families living in the city. The population density was 425.4 inhabitants per square mile (164.2/km^{2}). There were 294 housing units at an average density of 207.0 per square mile (79.9/km^{2}). The racial makeup of the city was 95.9% White, 0.3% African American, 0.2% Native American, 3.0% from other races, and 0.7% from two or more races. Hispanic or Latino of any race were 15.7% of the population.

There were 255 households, of which 31.0% had children under the age of 18 living with them, 54.1% were married couples living together, 7.1% had a female householder with no husband present, 6.7% had a male householder with no wife present, and 32.2% were non-families. 29.4% of all households were made up of individuals, and 9.8% had someone living alone who was 65 years of age or older. The average household size was 2.37 and the average family size was 2.92.

The median age in the city was 42.9 years. 24.5% of residents were under the age of 18; 7.1% were between the ages of 18 and 24; 20.6% were from 25 to 44; 32.2% were from 45 to 64; and 15.6% were 65 years of age or older. The gender makeup of the city was 52.6% male and 47.4% female.

=== 2000 census ===
As of the census of 2000, there were 657 people, 269 households, and 185 families living in the city. The population density was 458.9 inhabitants per square mile (177.2/km^{2}). There were 298 housing units at an average density of 208.2 per square mile (80.4/km^{2}). The racial makeup of the city was 96.35% White, 0.76% Native American (i.e. five persons), 0.15% Asian (one person), 1.37% from other races (i.e. nine persons), and 1.37% from two or more races (nine persons). 4.87% of the population (32 persons) were Hispanic or Latino of any race.

There were 269 households, out of which 33.5% had children under the age of 18 living with them, 55.0% were married couples living together, 10.0% had a female householder with no husband present, and 31.2% were non-families. 26.8% of all households were made up of individuals, and 12.6% had someone living alone who was 65 years of age or older. The average household size was 2.44 and the average family size was 2.98.

In the city, the population was spread out, with 27.5% under the age of 18, 5.2% from 18 to 24, 26.9% from 25 to 44, 25.4% from 45 to 64, and 14.9% who were 65 years of age or older. The median age was 39 years. For every 100 females, there were 106.6 males. For every 100 females age 18 and over, there were 97.5 males.

The median income for a household in the city was $34,643, and the median income for a family was $43,167. Males had a median income of $28,611 versus $19,083 for females. The per capita income for the city was $18,011. About 5.4% of families and 7.8% of the population were below the poverty line, including 11.1% of those under age 18 and 9.2% of those age 65 or over.

Ancestries: Polish (34.6%), German (26.6%), Norwegian (21.3%), Czech (8.7%), Irish (8.2%), French (5.3%).

== Education ==
=== K–12 ===
Minto Public School serves Minto and the surrounding rural areas of southeastern Walsh County. In 2000, the school was named one of the best 100 schools in The United States by the now defunct Offspring Magazine. The original school building, Minto School, was built in 1895 and is now a museum.
