= Battle of Turbigo =

Coordinates: 45°32′N 8°44′E

- Part of the Second Italian War of Independence
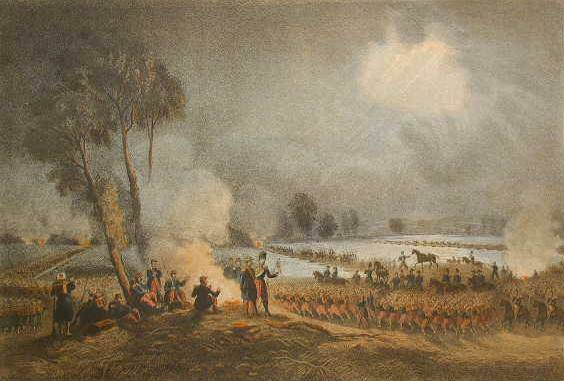
- The French II Corps at the Battle of Turbigo.
Date	3 June 1859
Location	near Turbigo, Lombardy
Result	French victory

Belligerents
(France) French Empire	Austrian Empire

Commanders and leaders
Jacques Camou; Patrice de MacMahon	Eduard Clam-Gallas; Franz von Cordon

Casualties and losses
8 killed 42 wounded	25 killed 46 wounded 35 missing

The Battle of Turbigo took place on 3 June 1859 saw the French army secure two crossing points over the Ticino River, allowing them to get a foothold in Austrian Lombardy.

In 1859 there were two main crossing points over the Ticino near Magenta. The main road and rail bridges crossed the river just to the west of Magenta. The road bridge was called the Ponte di Boffolara, after a village a few miles to the north east. On the western bank was the hamlet of San Martino, with an inn, railway station and Piedmontese custom post.

Five or six miles further to the north, at Turbigo, there was another river crossing, this time by ferry. In both cases the western bank of the river was higher than the eastern bank, so if the Austrians wanted to defend the river crossings they would have to do it on the west bank. They chose to fortify a bridgehead at San Martino, which by the start of June was defended by troops from Eduard Clam-Gallas's newly arrived corps.

For most of the month May the main armies had been campaigning, with the French and Piedmontese concentrated in the area around Alessandria and the Austrians to their north. In late May Napoleon III decided to move his entire army to the left and attack the vulnerable Austrian right wing.

After the Piedmontese victory at Palestro (30-31 May 1859) the Austrians finally realised what was happening, and Feldzeugmeister Franz Count Gyulai decided to retreat east, out of Piedmont and back across the Ticino into Lombardy. His aim was to defend Milan and prevent the Allies from advancing into the Austrian controlled north of Italy.

According to Frederick Schneid, "General Camou with a division of the Guard Voltigeurs, followed by MacMahon's II Corps and Fanti's 2nd Division, arrived at Turbigo, five miles northwest of Magenta, in an attempt to outflank Austrian positions, making the defense of the Naviglio Grande untenable. Camou's division crossed the Ticino by boat between 2 and 3am on 4 June. With the right bank secure, the French laid a pontoon bridge."
