= Magenta, Lombardy =

Magenta
- Comune
- Città di Magenta
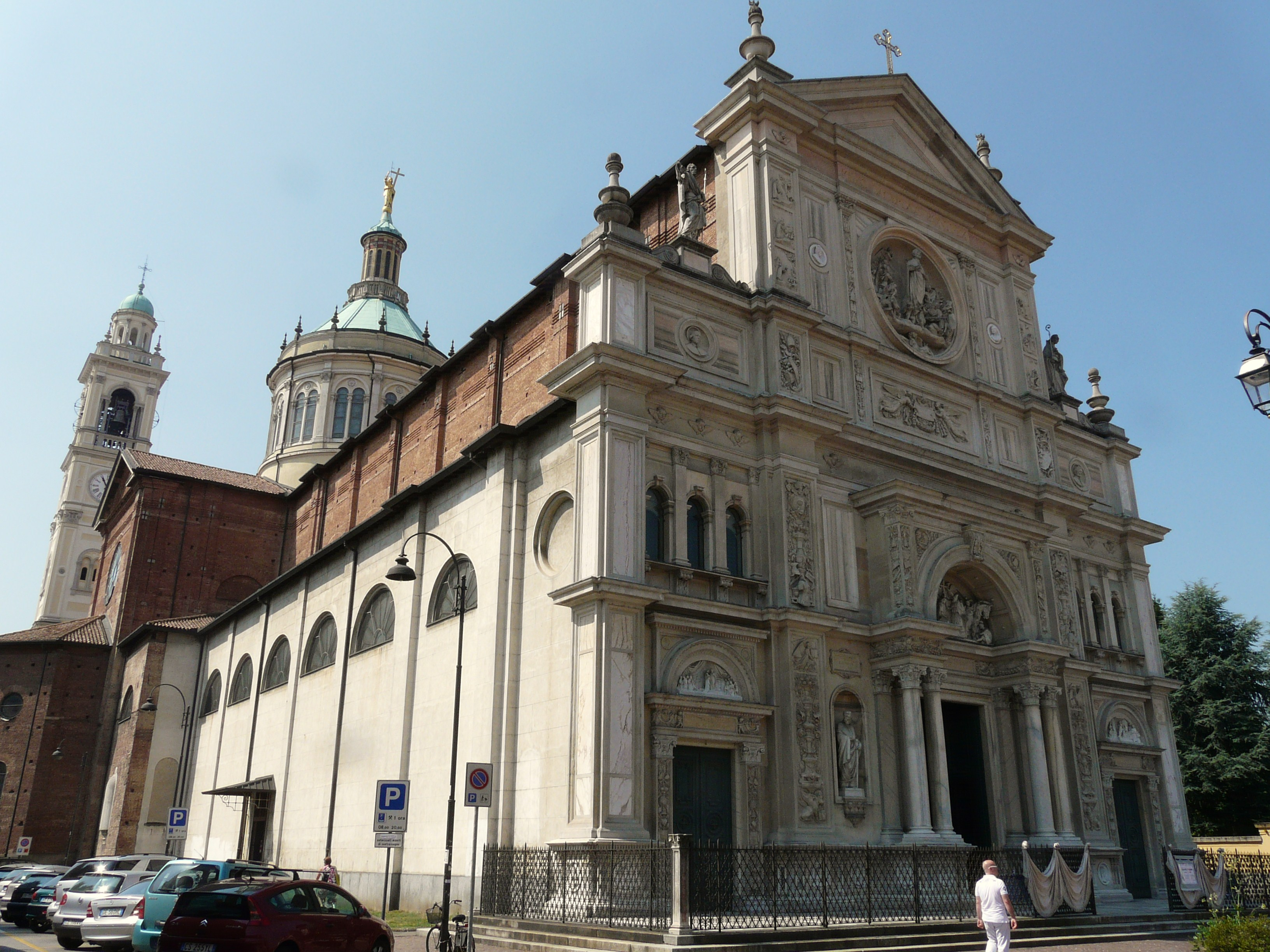
- Saint Martin Church

- Flag Coat of arms

- Location within Italy Location within Lombardy
- Coordinates: 45°28′N 08°53′E
- Country: Italy
- Region: Lombardy
- Metropolitan city: Milan (MI)
- Frazioni: Ponte Vecchio, Ponte Nuovo

Government
  - Mayor: Luca Del Gobbo, since 26-Jun-2022 (Center-right coalition)

Area
  - Total: 21 km^{2} (8.1 sq mi)
- Elevation: 138 m (453 ft)

Population (30 July 2016)
  - Total: 23,724
  - Density: 1,100/km^{2} (2,900/sq mi)
- Demonym: Magentini
- Time zone: UTC+1 (CET)
  - Summer (DST): UTC+2 (CEST)
- Postal code: 20013
- Dialing code: 02
- Patron saint: St. Martin of Tours, St. Roch, St. Blaise
- Saint day: November 11
- Website: Official website

Magenta (Italian pronunciation: [maˈdʒɛnta], Lombard pronunciation: [maˈdʒẽːta]) is a town and comune in the Metropolitan City of Milan in Lombardy, northern Italy. It became notable as the site of the Battle of Magenta in 1859. The color magenta takes its name from the battle.

Magenta is the birthplace of Saint Gianna Beretta Molla (1922–1962) and film producer Carlo Ponti (1912–2007). The municipality of Magenta is part of the Parco naturale lombardo della Valle del Ticino, a Nature reserve included by UNESCO in the World Network of Biosphere Reserves.

== History ==
First flag of the city, in use until 1970 circa

Magenta was probably a settlement of the Insubres, a Celtic tribe, who founded it around the 5th century BC. The area was conquered by the Romans in 222 BC. The name is traditionally connected to Castra Maxentia (lit. 'the camp named Maxentia'), referring to the emperor Maxentius. (Note: Compare Castra Regina for a similar appositional use of a proper noun with castra.) After the fall of the Western Roman Empire, it was ruled by the Lombards. The Celtic origins of Magenta are proved by some important archeological finds, especially in the area where now the Institute of Canossian Mothers stands; there was a Celtic necropolis in ancient times. Objects, jewelry and weapons were found here.

In the Middle Ages, it was destroyed twice, in 1162 by Frederick Barbarossa and in 1356 by the troops opposing the Visconti rule of Milan. In 1310, according to a legend, the emperor Henry VII was stopped here by a snowstorm during his march to Milan. In 1398 Gian Galeazzo Visconti donated the town territories to the monks of the Certosa di Pavia.

On 4 June 1859 it was the site of an important battle of the Second War of Italian Independence. The Franco-Piedmontese victory in the fight gave them the chance to conquer Austrian Lombardy.

Magenta received the honorary title of city by a presidential decree of 25 May 1947.

== Main sights ==
- Church of San Martino, built to commemorate the dead of the 1859 battle
- Monastery of Santa Maria Assunta, probably dating from the 14th century. The church, of Romanesque origin but with Baroque interiors, houses two works by il Bergognone (1501, once attributed to Bernardino Luini's workshop).
- Church of San Rocco (early 16th century)
- Casa Crivelli Boisio Beretta, an example of 15th-century noble house
- Casa Giacobbe
- Monument to general Patrice de MacMahon
- La Fagiana natural park, a former hunting resort of King Victor Emmanuel II

== Twin towns ==
Magenta is twinned with:

- Magenta, (Marne), France
- Sant'Anna di Stazzema, Italy

== Gallery ==
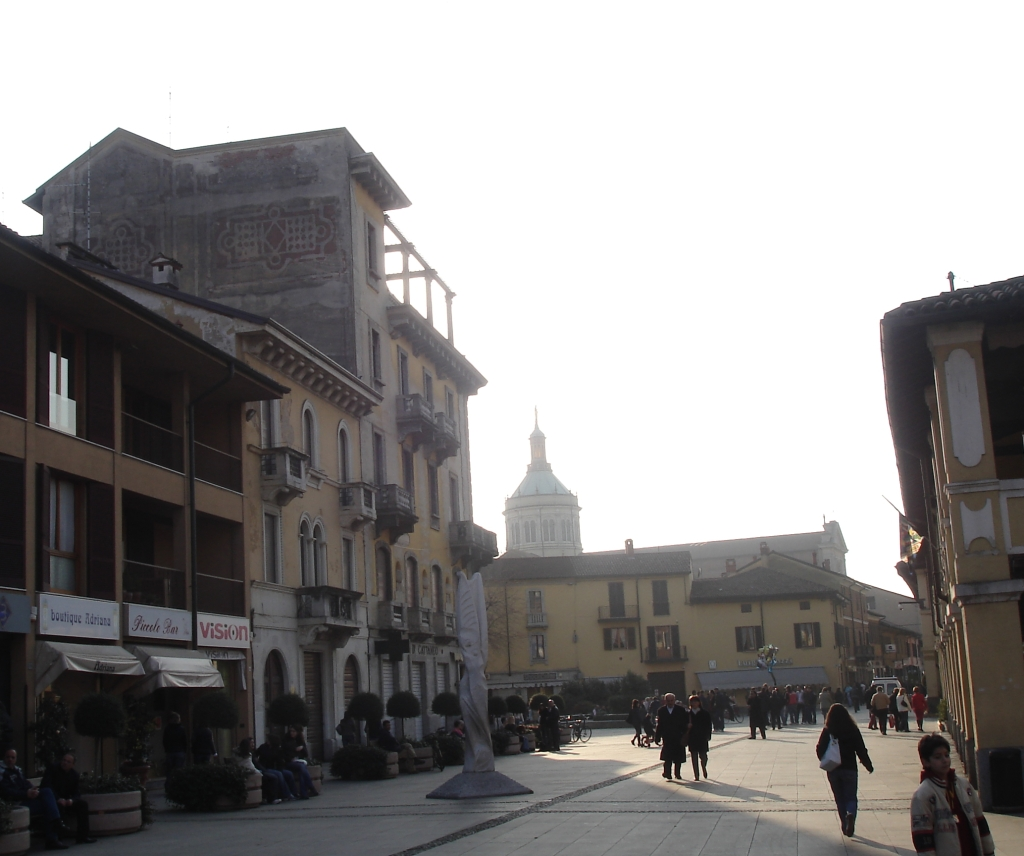
Main square

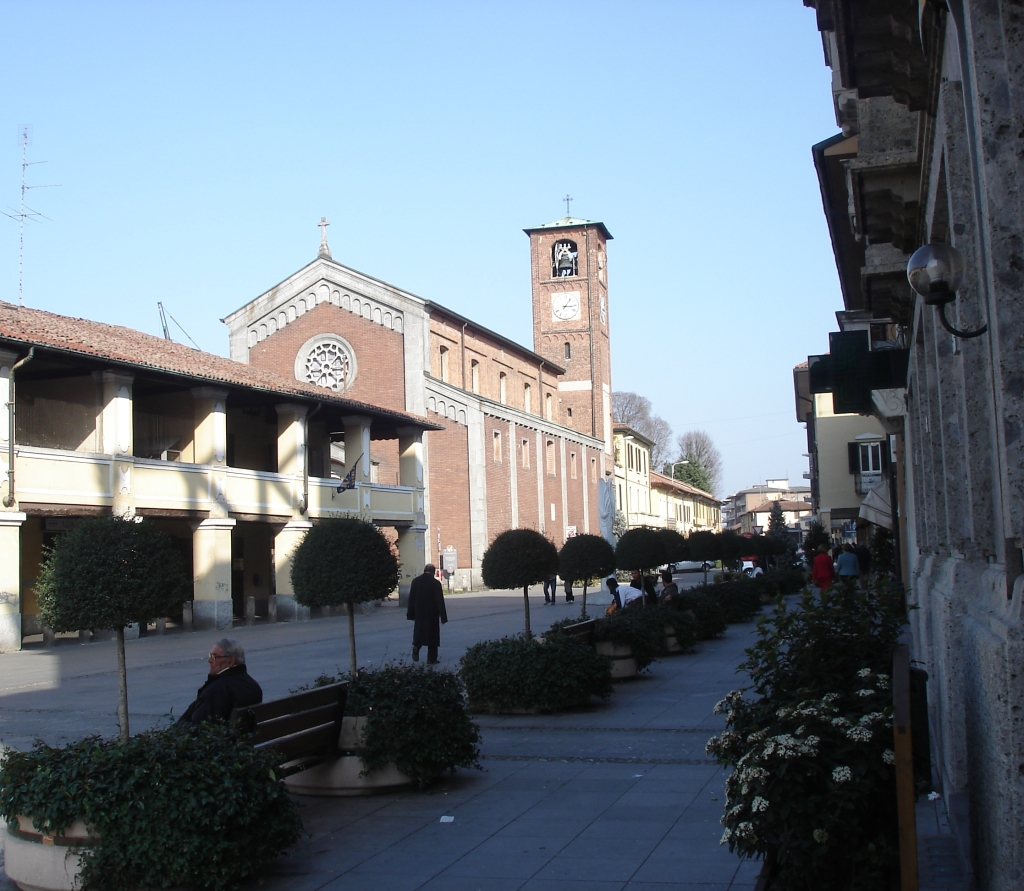
Off of main square

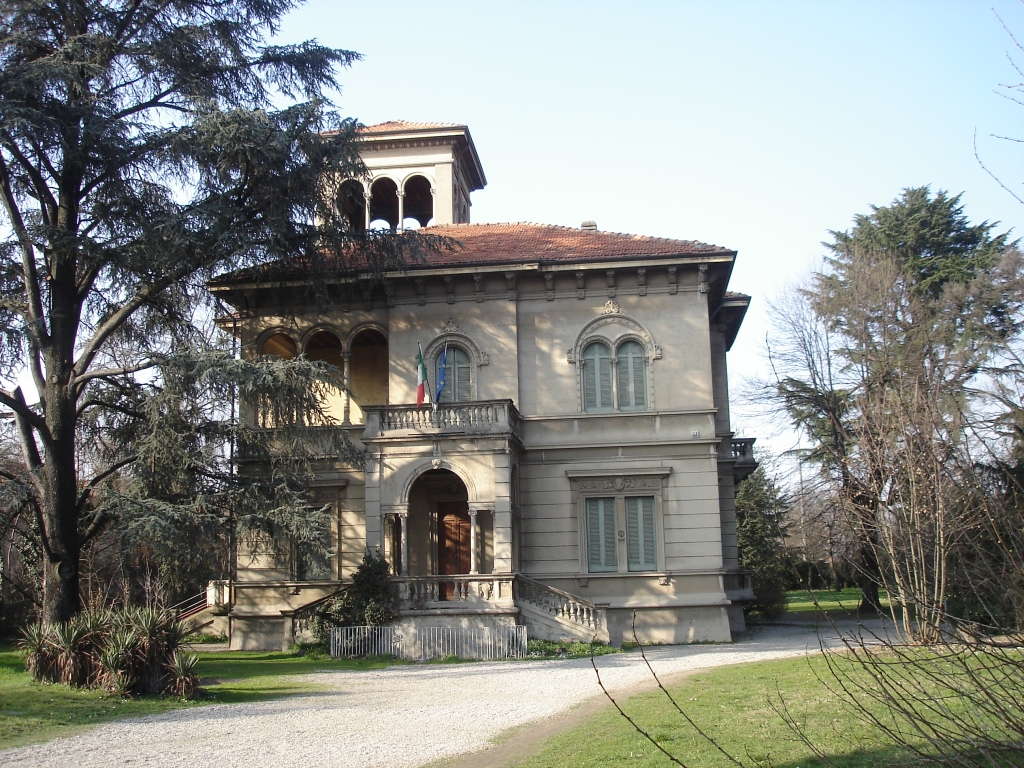
Magenta former library

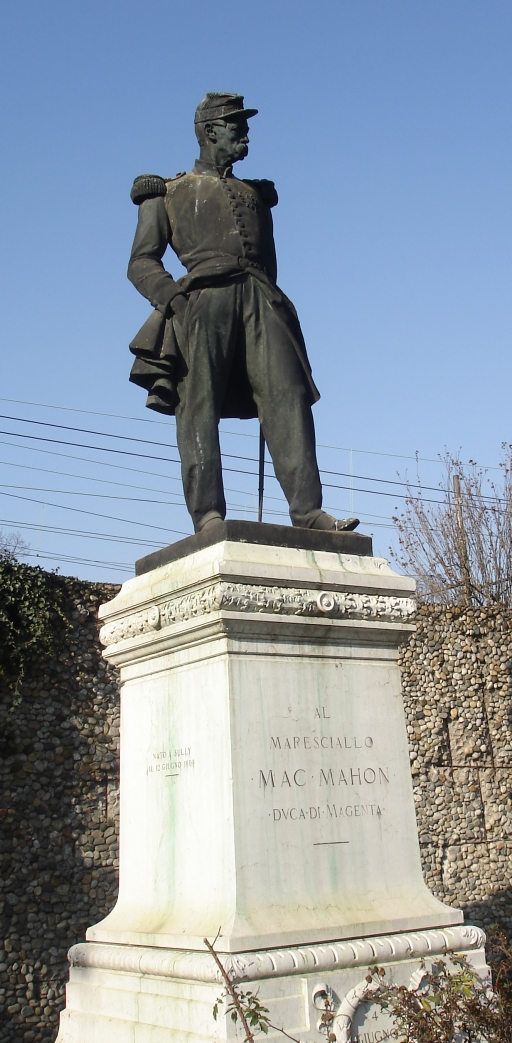
Monument to Patrice de MacMahon
