= Wahpeton micropolitan area =

Metropolitan area in North Dakota and Minnesota

- Micropolitan statistical area
- Wahpeton, ND–MN Micropolitan Statistical Area
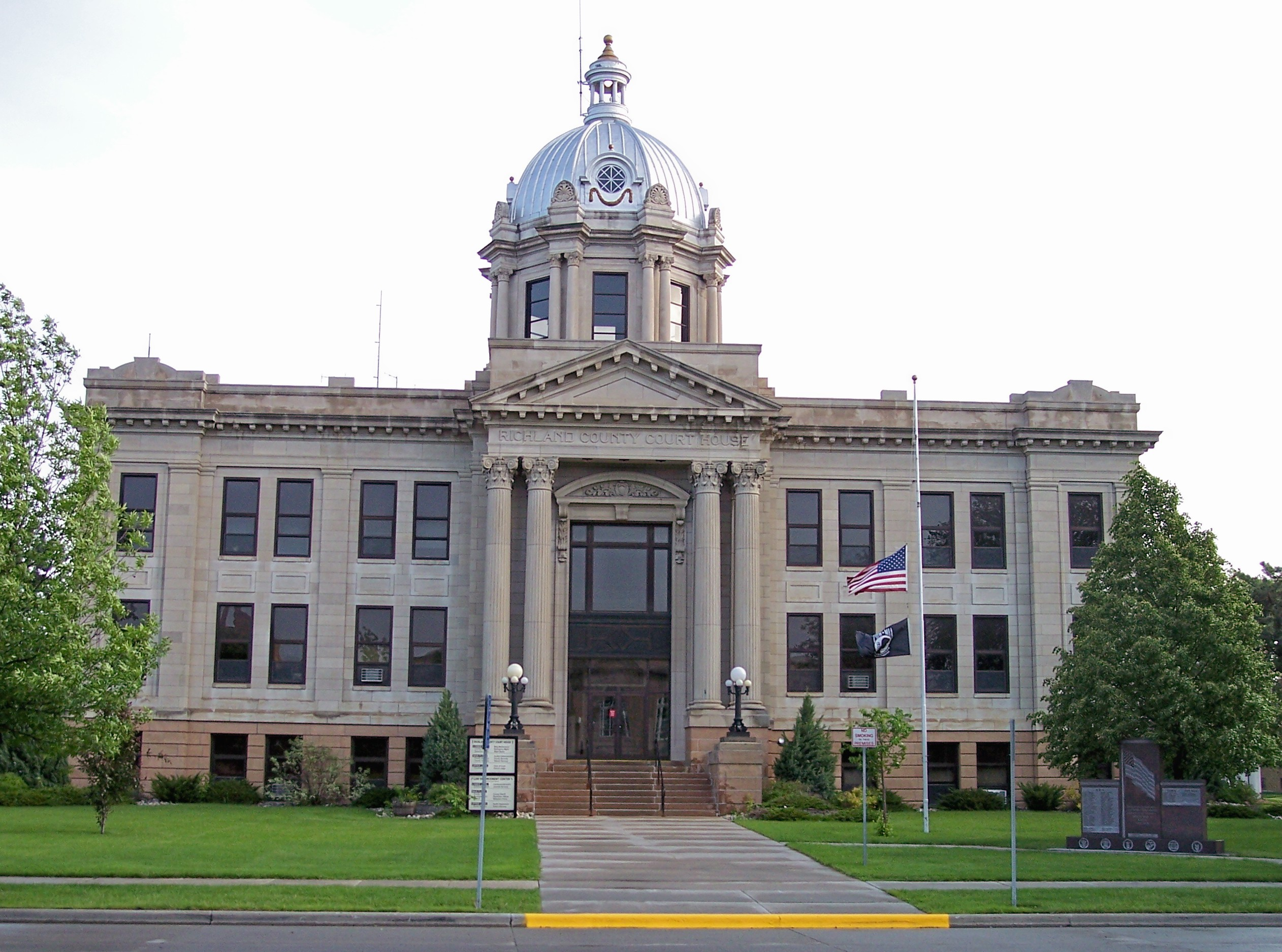
- The Richland County Courthouse in Wahpeton
City of Wahpeton
City of Breckenridge
Wahpeton, ND–MN μSA
- Country: United States
- State: North Dakota; Minnesota
- Largest city: Wahpeton, ND
- Other city: Breckenridge, MN

Population (2020)
  - Total: 23,035
  - Estimate (2025): 23,019
  - Rank: 488th in the U.S.
  - Density: 5,660/sq mi (2,187/km^{2})
- Time zone: UTC–6 (CST)
  - Summer (DST): UTC–5 (CDT)
- Area codes: 218 and 701
- Website: fargomoorhead.org

The Wahpeton micropolitan area, as defined by the Census Bureau, as comprising all of Richland and Wilkin Counties in North Dakota–Minnesota, anchored by the city of Wahpeton. As of the 2020 census, the population was 23,035 and was estimated to be 23,019 in 2025.

The Wahpeton micropolitan area is a component of the Fargo–Wahpeton, ND-MN Combined statistical area.

== Counties ==
- Richland (16,731)
- Wilkin (6,288)

== Communities ==
=== Incorporated Places ===
- Wahpeton, ND (8,141)
- Breckenridge, MN (3,323)
- Hankinson, ND (936)
- Lidgerwood, ND (585)
- Rothsay, MN (486)
- Wyndmere, ND (442)
- Fairmount, ND (331)
- Walcott, ND (268)
- Abercrombie, ND (269)
- Colfax, ND (217)
- Mooreton, ND (177)
- Campbell, MN (163)
- Christine, ND (149)
- Foxhome, MN (121)
- Wolverton, MN (118)
- Dwight, ND (77)
- Mantador, ND (68)
- Nashua, MN (64)
- Kent, MN (63)
- Great Bend, ND (52)
- Barney, ND (43)
- Doran, MN (31)

=== Township Places ===
- Center, ND (424)
- Walcott, ND (357)
- Dwight, ND (333)
- Colfax, ND (265)
- Abercrombie, ND (248)
- Eagle, ND (245)
- Prairie View, MN (221)
- Brightwood, ND (217)
- Summit, ND (215)
- Breckenridge, MN (210)
- Barrie, ND (188)
- Greendale, ND (149)
- Atherton, MN (148)
- Brandrup, MN (140)
- Sunnyside, MN (130)
- Grant, ND (128)
- Akron, MN (125)
- Duerr, ND (125)
- Mooreton, ND (122)
- Ibsen, ND (118)
- Danton, ND (116)
- Barney, ND (112)
- Belford, ND (111)
- Antelope, ND (110)
- Helendale, ND (102)
- Wyndmere, ND (102)
- Foxhome, MN (101)
- Connelly, MN (98)
- Roberts, MN (94)
- Fairmount, ND (93)
- Wolverton, MN (93)
- Nansen, ND (91)
- Deerhorn, MN (89)
- Homestead, ND (88)
- Liberty Grove, ND (88)
- Waldo, ND (84)
- Brandenburg, ND (83)
- Mitchell, MN (80)
- Dexter, ND (79)
- Garborg, ND (76)
- LaMars, ND (76)
- Devillo, ND (75)
- Bradford, MN (75)
- Nordick, MN (75)
- Elma, ND (74)
- Tanberg, MN (71)
- Viking, ND (65)
- Campbell, MN (65)
- Moran, ND (64)
- Sheyenne, ND (59)
- Andrea, MN (56)
- Meadows, MN (53)
- Champion, MN (52)
- McCauleyville, MN (52)
- West End, ND (51)
- Nilsen, MN (48)
- Freeman, ND (43)
- Manston, MN (40)

=== Unincorporated places ===
- Brushvale, MN
- Childs, MN
- Everdell, MN
- Galchutt, ND
- Lawndale, MN
- McCauleyville, MN
- Tenney, MN

== Demographics ==
Historical population
Census	Pop.	Note	%±
1860	40		—
1870	295		637.5%
1880	5,503		1,765.4%
1890	15,097		174.3%
1900	25,467		68.7%
1910	28,722		12.8%
1920	31,074		8.2%
1930	30,799		−0.9%
1940	30,994		0.6%
1950	30,432		−1.8%
1960	29,474		−3.1%
1970	27,478		−6.8%
1980	27,661		0.7%
1990	25,664		−7.2%
2000	25,136		−2.1%
2010	22,897		−8.9%
2020	23,035		0.6%
2025 (est.)	23,019		−0.1%
U.S. Decennial Census; 1790–1960 1900–1990; 1990–2000 2010–2020

=== 2020 census ===
As of the 2020 census, there were 23,035 people, 9,445 households, _ families residing within the μSA. The population density was 14,680.21 inhabitants per square mile (5,668.1/km^{2}). There were 10,473 housing units at an average density of 6,674.45 per square mile (2,577.0/km^{2}). The racial makeup of the μSA was 90.59% White, 0.86% African American, 2.44% Native American, 0.59% Asian, 0.11% Pacific Islander, 1.33% from some other races and 4.08% from two or more races. Hispanic or Latino people of any race were 3.41% of the population.

=== 2010 census ===
As of the 2010 census, there were 22,897 people, 9,341 households, _ families residing within the μSA. The population density was _. There were 10,581 housing units at an average density of _. The racial makeup of the μSA was 95.59% White, 0.55% African American, 1.72% Native American, 0.46% Asian, 0.04% Pacific Islander, 0.41% from some other races and 1.23% from two or more races. Hispanic or Latino people of any race were 1.75% of the population.

=== 2000 census ===
As of the 2000 census, there were 25,136 people, 9,437 households, and 6,353 families residing within the μSA. The population density was _. There were 10,581 housing units at an average density of _. The racial makeup of the μSA was 97.10% White, 0.29% African American, 1.31% Native American, 0.22% Asian, 0.03% Pacific Islander, 0.24% from some other races and 0.82% from two or more races. Hispanic or Latino people of any race were 0.93% of the population.

The median income for a household in the μSA was $37,096, and the median income for a family was $45,852. Males had a median income of $31,051 versus $20,618 for females. The per capita income for the μSA was $16,606.

== See also ==
- North Dakota statistical areas
- Minnesota statistical areas
