= Foxhome =

Foxhome can refer to a community in the United States:

- Foxhome, Minnesota, a small city
- Foxhome Township, Wilkin County, Minnesota
