= McCauleyville =

McCauleyville may refer to:

- McCauleyville, Minnesota, an unincorporated community
- McCauleyville Township, Wilkin County, Minnesota
