= David N. Peet Farmstead =

- U.S. National Register of Historic Places
- Location within Minnesota Location within the United States
- Location: County Road 32, Deerhorn Township, Minnesota
- Coordinates: 46°37′1″N 96°38′44″W
- Area: 2 acres (0.81 ha)
- Built: 1901–1920
- Architect: William Merritt
- Architectural style: Queen Anne
- MPS: Wilkin County MRA
- NRHP reference No.: 80002187
- Designated: July 17, 1980

The David N. Peet Farmstead is a historic farmstead in Deerhorn Township, Minnesota, United States. It was listed on the National Register of Historic Places in 1980 for its local significance in the theme of agriculture. The listing consists of four contributing properties: the 1901 barn, 1902 Queen Anne farmhouse, 1912 wood-hoop silo, and 1920 windmill. The property was nominated for being one of Wilkin County's best exemplars of the prosperity achieved by some of its late-19th-century farmers. Peet acquired the property in 1881.

== See also ==
- National Register of Historic Places listings in Wilkin County, Minnesota
