= Mantador, North Dakota =

Mantador
- City
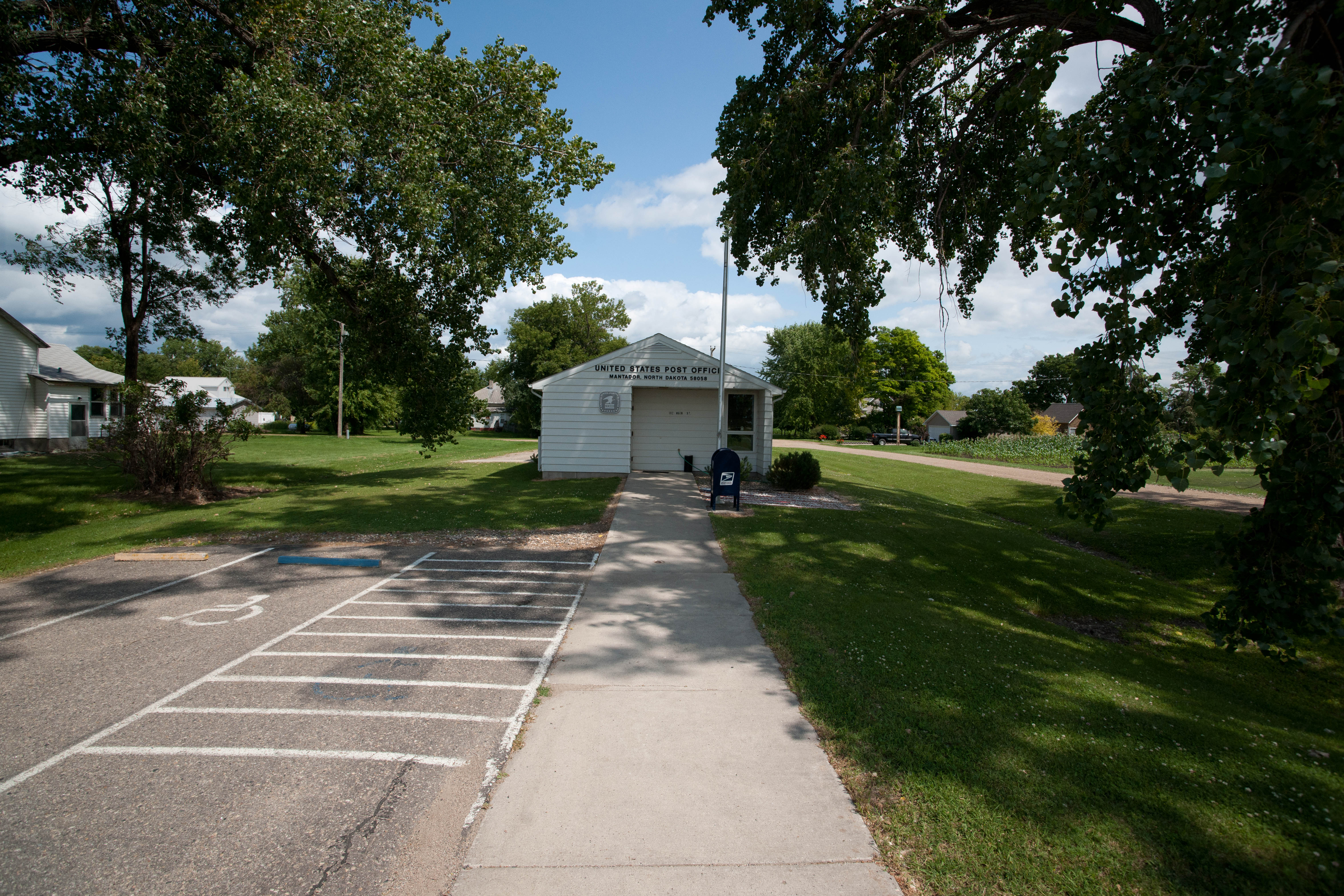
- Post office in Mantador

- Location of Mantador, North Dakota
- Coordinates: 46°09′56″N 96°58′40″W
- Country: United States
- State: North Dakota
- County: Richland
- Founded: 1893

Area
  - Total: 0.14 sq mi (0.35 km^{2})
  - Land: 0.14 sq mi (0.35 km^{2})
  - Water: 0 sq mi (0.00 km^{2})
- Elevation: 1,027 ft (313 m)

Population (2020)
  - Total: 67
  - Estimate (2024): 67
  - Density: 489.0/sq mi (188.81/km^{2})
- Time zone: UTC–6 (Central (CST))
  - Summer (DST): UTC–5 (CDT)
- ZIP Code: 58058
- Area code: 701
- FIPS code: 38-50380
- GNIS feature ID: 1036147

Mantador is a city in Richland County, North Dakota, United States. The population was 67 at the 2020 census. Mantador was founded in 1893. It is part of the Wahpeton, ND-MN Micropolitan Statistical Area.

== Geography ==
According to the United States Census Bureau, the city has an area of 0.14 square miles (0.36 km^{2}), all land.

== History ==
Mantador was established in 1886 by the Soo Line Railroad as a depot under the so-called "Long Length Law." The law required that depots must be placed at nine-mile intervals along the track in order to provide fuel and water for trains and to provide postal service for settlers. The town developed around the depot.

== Demographics ==
Historical population
Census	Pop.	Note	%±
1950	138		—
1960	98		−29.0%
1970	95		−3.1%
1980	76		−20.0%
1990	77		1.3%
2000	71		−7.8%
2010	64		−9.9%
2020	67		4.7%
2024 (est.)	67		0.0%
U.S. Decennial Census; 2020 Census

=== 2010 census ===
As of the 2010 census, there were 64 people, 29 households, and 19 families residing in the city. The population density was 457.1 inhabitants per square mile (176.5/km^{2}). There were 36 housing units at an average density of 257.1 per square mile (99.3/km^{2}). The racial makeup of the city was 92.2% White, 3.1% Native American, 1.6% Asian, and 3.1% from two or more races.

There were 29 households, of which 31.0% had children under the age of 18 living with them, 55.2% were married couples living together, 10.3% had a female householder with no husband present, and 34.5% were non-families. 34.5% of all households were made up of individuals, and 13.8% had someone living alone who was 65 years of age or older. The average household size was 2.21 and the average family size was 2.84.

The median age in the city was 46 years. 23.4% of residents were under the age of 18; 7.9% were between the ages of 18 and 24; 17.3% were from 25 to 44; 45.4% were from 45 to 64; and 6.3% were 65 years of age or older. The gender makeup of the city was 50.0% male and 50.0% female.

=== 2000 census ===
As of the 2000 census, there were 71 people, 31 households, and 15 families residing in the city. The population density was 501.5 inhabitants per square mile (193.6/km^{2}). There were 37 housing units at an average density of 261.4 per square mile (100.9/km^{2}). The racial makeup of the city was 100.00% White.

There were 31 households, out of which 38.7% had children under the age of 18 living with them, 48.4% were married couples living together, 3.2% had a female householder with no husband present, and 48.4% were non-families. 48.4% of all households were made up of individuals, and 22.6% had someone living alone who was 65 years of age or older. The average household size was 2.29 and the average family size was 3.50.

In the city, the population was spread out, with 29.6% under the age of 18, 8.5% from 18 to 24, 28.2% from 25 to 44, 18.3% from 45 to 64, and 15.5% who were 65 years of age or older. The median age was 36 years. For every 100 females, there were 97.2 males. For every 100 females age 18 and over, there were 92.3 males.

The median income for a household in the town was $26,875, and the median income for a family was $41,875. Males had a median income of $37,500 versus $0 for females. The per capita income for the city was $14,849. There were no families and 2.9% of the population living below the poverty line, including no under eighteens and 15.4% of those over 64.

== Notable people ==
- Heidi Heitkamp, in 2012 the first woman elected as United States Senator from North Dakota and the second to serve
- Cody Mauch, American football player for the Tampa Bay Buccaneers
