= Champion Township =

Champion Township may refer to the following places in the United States:

- Champion Township, Michigan
- Champion Township, Minnesota
- Champion Township, Trumbull County, Ohio
