= Akron Township =

Akron Township may refer to the following places in the United States:

- Akron Township, Peoria County, Illinois
- Akron Township, Michigan
- Akron Township, Big Stone County, Minnesota
- Akron Township, Wilkin County, Minnesota
