= Nordick =

Nordick may refer to:

== Surname ==
- Steve Nordick, Canadian politician in Yukon

== Places ==
- Nordick Lake, Canadian lake in Manitoba
- Nordick Township, Wilkin County, Minnesota
