= United Lutheran Church =

United Lutheran Church may refer to:

== Church organizations ==
- United Evangelical Lutheran Church, 1896 to 1960
- United Lutheran Church in America, 1918 to 1962
- United Norwegian Lutheran Church of America, 1890 to 1917

== Specific places ==
- United Lutheran Church (Grand Forks, North Dakota), listed on the NRHP in Grand Forks County, North Dakota
- Christ Hamilton United Lutheran Church and Cemetery, Hamilton Square, Pennsylvania, NRHP-listed
- Stiklestad United Lutheran Church, Doran, Minnesota, listed on the NRHP in Minnesota
