= Sunnyside Township =

Sunnyside Township may refer to:

- Sunnyside Township, Wilkin County, Minnesota
- Sunnyside Township, Pennington County, South Dakota

== See also ==
- Sunnyside (disambiguation)
