= Barney, North Dakota =

- City
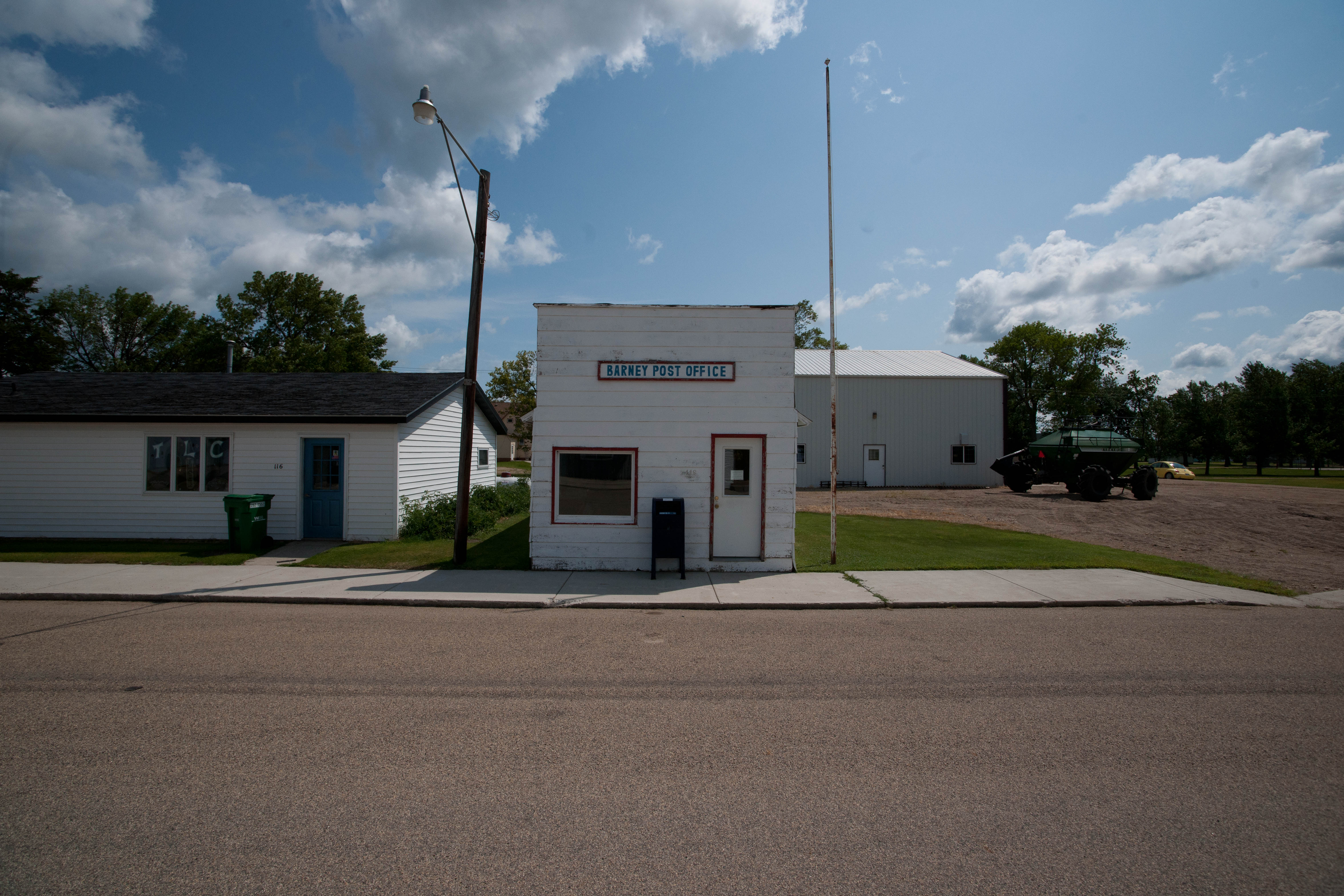
- Post office in Barney (August 2009)
- Interactive map of Barney, North Dakota
- Location within North Dakota
- Coordinates: 46.2658°N 96.9988°W
- Country: United States
- State: North Dakota
- County: Richland
- Founded: 1899

Area
  - Total: 0.184 sq mi (0.476 km^{2})
  - Land: 0.184 sq mi (0.476 km^{2})
  - Water: 0 sq mi (0.000 km^{2}) 0.00%
- Elevation: 1,033 ft (315 m)

Population (2020)
  - Total: 40
  - Estimate (2025): 43
  - Density: 220/sq mi (84/km^{2})
- Time zone: UTC–6 (Central (CST))
  - Summer (DST): UTC–5 (CDT)
- ZIP Code: 58008
- Area code: 701
- FIPS code: 38-04940
- GNIS feature ID: 1035922

Barney is a city in Richland County, North Dakota, United States. The population was 40 as of the 2020 census, and was estimated at 43 in 2025. It is part of the Wahpeton, ND–MN Micropolitan Statistical Area.

== History ==
Barney was founded in 1899.

== Geography ==
According to the United States Census Bureau, the city has a total area of 0.184 square miles (0.48 km^{2}), all land.

== Demographics ==
Historical population
Census	Pop.	Note	%±
1960	115		—
1970	81		−29.6%
1980	70		−13.6%
1990	79		12.9%
2000	69		−12.7%
2010	52		−24.6%
2020	40		−23.1%
2025 (est.)	43		7.5%
U.S. Decennial Census; 2020 Census

=== 2020 census ===
As of the 2020 census, there were 40 people, 28 households, and 16 families residing in the city.

=== 2010 census ===
As of the 2010 census, there were 52 people, 24 households, and 14 families residing in the city. The population density was 325.0 inhabitants per square mile (125.5/km^{2}). There were 28 housing units at an average density of 175.0 per square mile (67.6/km^{2}). The racial makeup of the city was 98.1% White and 1.9% from two or more races.

There were 24 households, of which 20.8% had children under the age of 18 living with them, 54.2% were married couples living together, 4.2% had a female householder with no husband present, and 41.7% were non-families. 37.5% of all households were made up of individuals, and 25% had someone living alone who was 65 years of age or older. The average household size was 2.17 and the average family size was 2.71.

The median age in the city was 49 years. 15.4% of residents were under the age of 18; 11.5% were between the ages of 18 and 24; 17.2% were from 25 to 44; 40.5% were from 45 to 64; and 15.4% were 65 years of age or older. The gender makeup of the city was 48.1% male and 51.9% female.

=== 2000 census ===
As of the 2000 census, there were 69 people, 25 households, and 17 families residing in the city. The population density was 432.5 inhabitants per square mile (167.0/km^{2}). There were 28 housing units at an average density of 175.5 per square mile (67.8/km^{2}). The racial makeup of the city was 100.00% White.

There were 25 households, out of which 36.0% had children under the age of 18 living with them, 56.0% were married couples living together, 8.0% had a female householder with no husband present, and 32.0% were non-families. 16.0% of all households were made up of individuals, and 12.0% had someone living alone who was 65 years of age or older. The average household size was 2.76 and the average family size was 3.35.

In the city, the population was spread out, with 33.3% under the age of 18, 7.2% from 18 to 24, 21.7% from 25 to 44, 26.1% from 45 to 64, and 11.6% who were 65 years of age or older. The median age was 36 years. For every 100 females, there were 76.9 males. For every 100 females age 18 and over, there were 91.7 males.

The median income for a household was $36,875, and the median income for a family was $46,667. Males had a median income of $34,375 versus $19,375 for females. The per capita income for the city was $14,079. There were no families and 7.6% of the population living below the poverty line, including no under eighteens and 20.0% of those over 64.
