= Lidgerwood, North Dakota =

- City
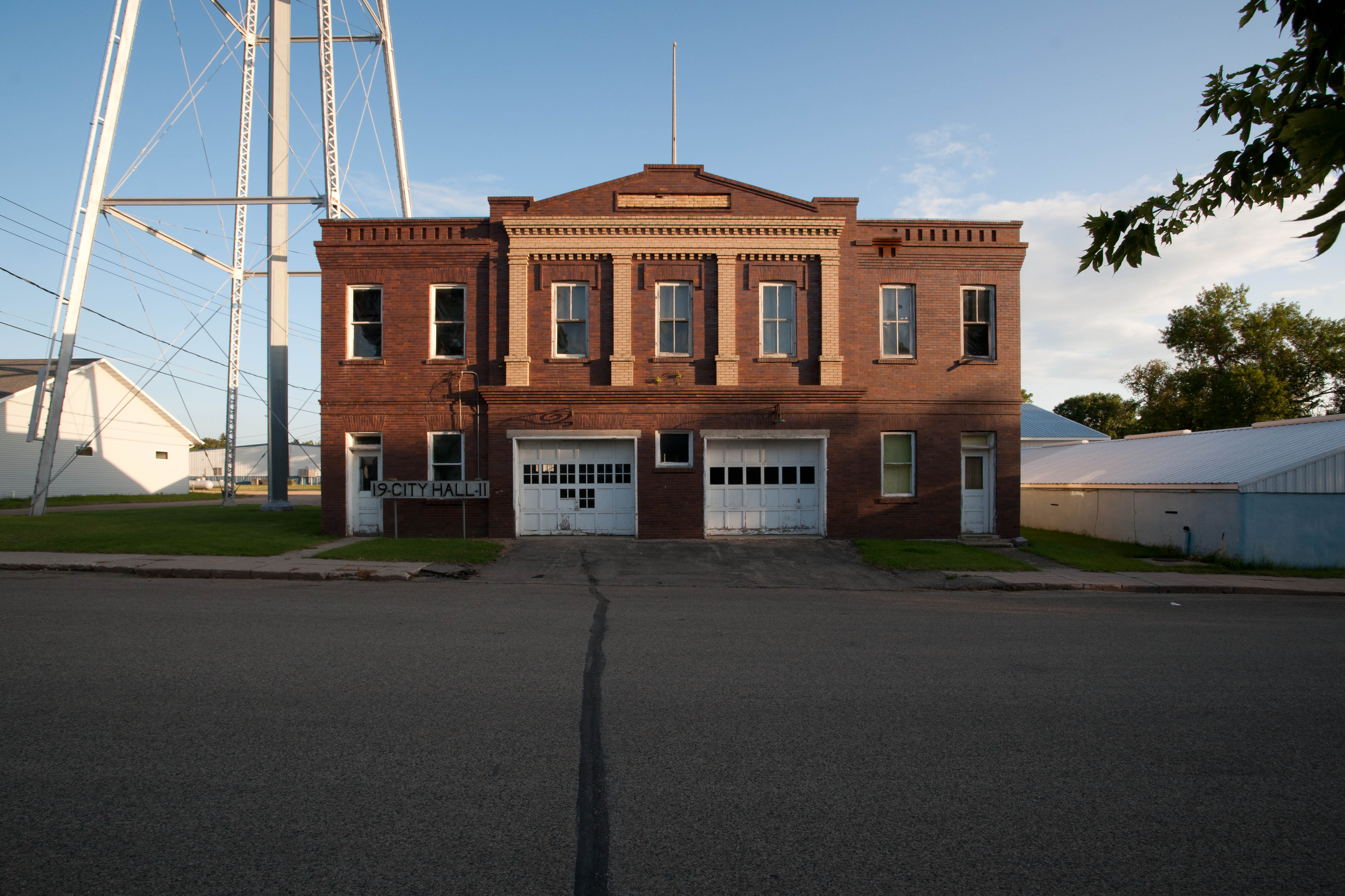
- Lidgerwood City Hall

- Logo
- Motto(s): "Small Town, Big Traditions"
- Interactive map of Lidgerwood, North Dakota
- Location within North Dakota
- Coordinates: 46.0738°N 97.1452°W
- Country: United States
- State: North Dakota
- County: Richland
- Founded: 1886

Government
  - Type: Mayor–council
  - Mayor: Kevin Oster
  - President: Dave Ohm
  - Vice president: Richard Novotny
  - Councilmembers: Marlin Helmer; Anna Harles; Derek Wieber; Lino Quintero

Area
  - Total: 0.642 sq mi (1.662 km^{2})
  - Land: 0.642 sq mi (1.662 km^{2})
  - Water: 0 sq mi (0.000 km^{2}) 0.00%
- Elevation: 1,112 ft (339 m)

Population (2020)
  - Total: 600
  - Estimate (2025): 585
  - Density: 940/sq mi (360/km^{2})
- Time zone: UTC–6 (Central (CST))
  - Summer (DST): UTC–5 (CDT)
- ZIP Code: 58053
- Area code: 701
- FIPS code: 38-46460
- GNIS feature ID: 1036129
- Website: cityoflidgerwoodnd.com

Lidgerwood is a city in Richland County, North Dakota, United States. The population was 600 as of the 2020 census, and was estimated at 585 in 2025. It is part of the Wahpeton, ND–MN Micropolitan Statistical Area.

== History ==
Lidgerwood was founded in 1886.

== Geography ==
According to the United States Census Bureau, the city has a total area of 0.642 square miles (1.66 km^{2}), all land.

== Climate ==
This climatic region is typified by large seasonal temperature differences, with warm to hot (and often humid) summers and cold (sometimes severely cold) winters. According to the Köppen Climate Classification system, Lidgerwood has a humid continental climate, abbreviated "Dfb" on climate maps.

== Demographics ==
Historical population
Census	Pop.	Note	%±
1900	585		—
1910	1,019		74.2%
1920	1,065		4.5%
1930	1,029		−3.4%
1940	1,042		1.3%
1950	1,147		10.1%
1960	1,081		−5.8%
1970	1,000		−7.5%
1980	971		−2.9%
1990	799		−17.7%
2000	738		−7.6%
2010	652		−11.7%
2020	600		−8.0%
2025 (est.)	585		−2.5%
U.S. Decennial Census; 2020 Census

According to realtor website Zillow, the average price of a home as of June 30, 2026, in Lidgerwood was $128,238.

As of the 2024 American Community Survey, there were 336 estimated households in Lidgerwood with an average of 2.14 persons per household. The city has a median household income of $49,667. Approximately 9.5% of the city's population lives at or below the poverty line. Lidgerwood has an estimated 59.1% employment rate, with 21.1% of the population holding a bachelor's degree or higher and 91.1% holding a high school diploma. There were 403 housing units at an average density of 627.73 per square mile (242.4/km^{2}).

The top five reported languages (people were allowed to report up to two languages, thus the figures will generally add to more than 100%) were English (93.7%), Spanish (6.3%), Indo-European (0.0%), Asian and Pacific Islander (0.0%), and Other (0.0%).

The median age in the city was 36.8 years.

Lidgerwood, North Dakota – racial and ethnic composition Note: the US Census treats Hispanic/Latino as an ethnic category. This table excludes Latinos from the racial categories and assigns them to a separate category. Hispanics/Latinos may be of any race.
Race / ethnicity (NH = non-Hispanic)	Pop. 2000	Pop. 2010	Pop. 2020	% 2000	% 2010	% 2020
White alone (NH)	714	630	552	96.75%	96.63%	92.00%
Black or African American alone (NH)	0	0	2	0.00%	0.00%	0.33%
Native American or Alaska Native alone (NH)	11	13	13	1.49%	1.99%	2.17%
Asian alone (NH)	1	0	2	0.14%	0.00%	0.33%
Pacific Islander alone (NH)	0	0	0	0.00%	0.00%	0.00%
Other race alone (NH)	0	0	0	0.00%	0.00%	0.00%
Mixed race or multiracial (NH)	6	3	12	0.81%	0.46%	2.00%
Hispanic or Latino (any race)	6	6	19	0.81%	0.92%	3.17%
Total	738	652	600	100.00%	100.00%	100.00%

=== 2020 census ===
As of the 2020 census, there were 600 people, 314 households, 159 families residing in the city. The population density was 934.58 inhabitants per square mile (360.8/km^{2}). There were 386 housing units at an average density of 601.25 per square mile (232.1/km^{2}). The racial makeup of the city was 93.17% White, 0.33% African American, 2.17% Native American, 0.33% Asian, 0.00% Pacific Islander, 1.33% from some other races and 2.67% from two or more races. Hispanic or Latino people of any race were 3.17% of the population.

=== 2010 census ===
As of the 2010 census, there were 652 people, 335 households, 160 families residing in the city. The population density was 986.38 inhabitants per square mile (380.8/km^{2}). There were 417 housing units at an average density of 630.86 per square mile (243.6/km^{2}). The racial makeup of the city was 97.55% White, 0.00% African American, 1.99% Native American, 0.00% Asian, 0.00% Pacific Islander, 0.00% from some other races and 0.46% from two or more races. Hispanic or Latino people of any race were 0.92% of the population.

There were 335 households, of which 17.6% had children under the age of 18 living with them, 39.4% were married couples living together, 6.9% had a female householder with no husband present, 1.5% had a male householder with no wife present, and 52.2% were non-families. 46.0% of all households were made up of individuals, and 28.4% had someone living alone who was 65 years of age or older. The average household size was 1.95 and the average family size was 2.78.

The median age in the city was 51.3 years. 19% of residents were under the age of 18; 4.2% were between the ages of 18 and 24; 16.6% were from 25 to 44; 27.6% were from 45 to 64; and 32.5% were 65 years of age or older. The gender makeup of the city was 47.4% male and 52.6% female.

=== 2000 census ===
As of the 2000 census, there were 738 people, 345 households, 207 families residing in the city. The population density was 1,122.40 inhabitants per square mile (433.4/km^{2}). There were 404 housing units at an average density of 614.43 per square mile (237.2/km^{2}). The racial makeup of the city was 97.29% White, 0.00% African American, 1.76% Native American, 0.14% Asian, 0.00% Pacific Islander, 0.00% from some other races and 0.81% from two or more races. Hispanic or Latino people of any race were 0.81% of the population.

There were 345 households, out of which 21.2% had children under the age of 18 living with them, 47.0% were married couples living together, 7.2% had a female householder with no husband present, and 40.0% were non-families. 36.2% of all households were made up of individuals, and 23.8% had someone living alone who was 65 years of age or older. The average household size was 2.14 and the average family size was 2.79.

In the city, the population was spread out, with 20.7% under the age of 18, 5.7% from 18 to 24, 23.3% from 25 to 44, 20.1% from 45 to 64, and 30.2% who were 65 years of age or older. The median age was 45 years. For every 100 females, there were 97.9 males. For every 100 females age 18 and over, there were 97.0 males.

The median income for a household in the city was $25,887, and the median income for a family was $29,464. Males had a median income of $25,000 versus $16,818 for females. The per capita income for the city was $14,303. About 8.8% of families and 13.7% of the population were below the poverty line, including 19.5% of those under age 18 and 8.0% of those age 65 or over.
