= Lawndale, Minnesota =

Unincorporated community in Minnesota, United States

Lawndale
- Unincorporated community
- Location within Minnesota Location within the United States
- Coordinates: 46°33′25″N 96°21′37″W
- Country: United States
- State: Minnesota
- County: Wilkin
- Elevation: 1,070 ft (330 m)
- Time zone: UTC-6 (Central (CST))
  - Summer (DST): UTC-5 (CDT)
- Area code: 218
- GNIS feature ID: 646532

Lawndale is an unincorporated community in Prairie View Township, Wilkin County, Minnesota, United States.

The community is located between Rothsay and Barnesville at the junction of County Road 30 and County Road 52.

Lawndale is immediately west of the junction of Interstate 94 and State Highway 108 / County 30.
