= Nashua, Minnesota =

City in Minnesota, United States

- City
- Location of Nashua, Minnesota
- Coordinates: 46°2′14″N 96°18′30″W
- Country: United States
- State: Minnesota
- County: Wilkin
- Incorporated: April 19, 1902

Government
  - Mayor: Darin Raguse

Area
  - Total: 3.513 sq mi (9.098 km^{2})
  - Land: 3.513 sq mi (9.098 km^{2})
  - Water: 0 sq mi (0.000 km^{2})
- Elevation: 1,004 ft (306 m)

Population (2020)
  - Total: 67
  - Estimate (2022): 65
  - Density: 19.1/sq mi (7.36/km^{2})
- Time zone: UTC–6 (Central (CST))
  - Summer (DST): UTC–5 (CDT)
- ZIP Code: 56565
- Area code: 218
- FIPS code: 27-44944
- GNIS feature ID: 0648426
- Sales tax: 6.875%

Nashua (/ˈnæʃwə/ NASH-wə) is a city in Wilkin County, Minnesota, United States. The population was 67 at the 2020 census. It is part of the Wahpeton, ND-MN Micropolitan Statistical Area.

== History ==
A post office called Nashua was established in 1892, and remained in operation until 1996. The city was named for the Nash family of early settlers.

== Geography ==
According to the United States Census Bureau, the city has a total area of 3.513 square miles (9.10 km^{2}), all land.

Minnesota State Highway 55 serves as a main route in the community, and Minnesota State Highway 9 is nearby.

== Demographics ==
Historical population
Census	Pop.	Note	%±
1910	271		—
1920	127		−53.1%
1930	161		26.8%
1940	177		9.9%
1950	181		2.3%
1960	146		−19.3%
1970	114		−21.9%
1980	89		−21.9%
1990	63		−29.2%
2000	69		9.5%
2010	68		−1.4%
2020	67		−1.5%
2022 (est.)	65		−3.0%
U.S. Decennial Census; 2020 Census

=== 2010 census ===
As of the 2010 census, there were 68 people, 25 households, and 19 families residing in the city. The population density was 19.4 inhabitants per square mile (7.5/km^{2}). There were 31 housing units at an average density of 8.9 per square mile (3.4/km^{2}). The racial makeup of the city was 100.0% White. Hispanic or Latino of any race were 14.7% of the population.

There were 25 households, of which 40.0% had children under the age of 18 living with them, 60.0% were married couples living together, 16.0% had a female householder with no husband present, and 24.0% were non-families. 24.0% of all households were made up of individuals, and 8% had someone living alone who was 65 years of age or older. The average household size was 2.72 and the average family size was 3.11.

The median age in the city was 31.5 years. 30.9% of residents were under the age of 18; 4.5% were between the ages of 18 and 24; 30.9% were from 25 to 44; 22.1% were from 45 to 64; and 11.8% were 65 years of age or older. The gender makeup of the city was 61.8% male and 38.2% female.

=== 2000 census ===
As of the 2000 census, there were 69 people, 27 households, and 20 families residing in the city. The population density was 20.0 people per square mile (7.7/km^{2}). There were 33 housing units at an average density of 9.6 per square mile (3.7/km^{2}). The racial makeup of the city was 95.65% White, and 4.35% from two or more races. Hispanic or Latino of any race were 5.80% of the population.

There were 27 households, out of which 44.4% had children under the age of 18 living with them, 55.6% were married couples living together, 18.5% had a female householder with no husband present, and 25.9% were non-families. 18.5% of all households were made up of individuals, and 11.1% had someone living alone who was 65 years of age or older. The average household size was 2.56 and the average family size was 3.00.

In the city, the population was spread out, with 34.8% under the age of 18, 7.2% from 18 to 24, 29.0% from 25 to 44, 18.8% from 45 to 64, and 10.1% who were 65 years of age or older. The median age was 35 years. For every 100 females, there were 81.6 males. For every 100 females age 18 and over, there were 95.7 males.

The median income for a household in the city was $32,500, and the median income for a family was $33,750. Males had a median income of $31,875 versus $19,107 for females. The per capita income for the city was $15,168. There were no families and 2.6% of the population living below the poverty line, including no under eighteens and none of those over 64.
