= Campbell, Minnesota =

City in Minnesota, United States

- City
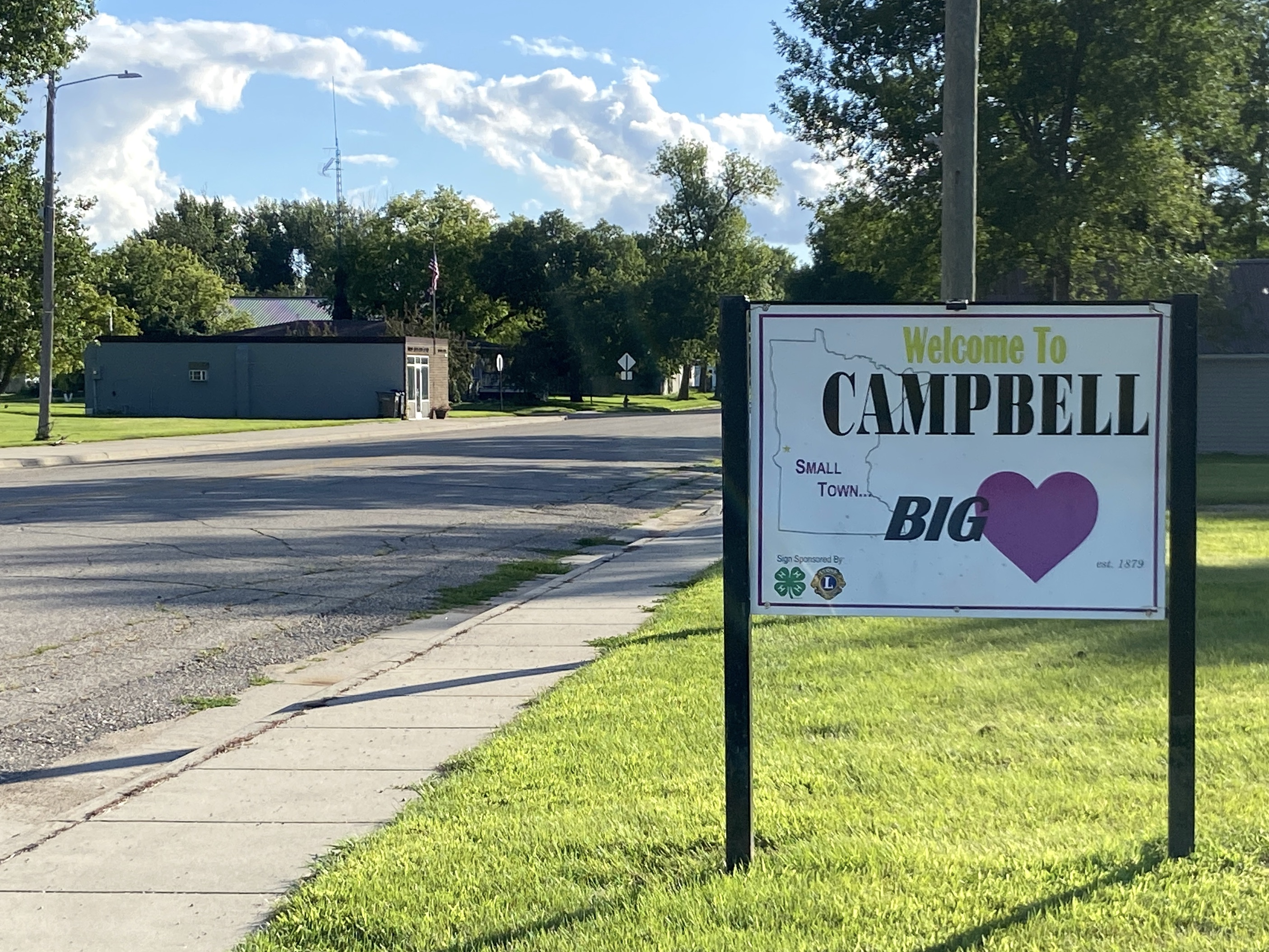

- Location of Campbell, Minnesota
- Coordinates: 46°05′51″N 96°24′20″W
- Country: United States
- State: Minnesota
- County: Wilkin
- Founded: 1871
- Incorporated: January 28, 1899

Government
  - Mayor: Joe Kleindl

Area
  - Total: 0.237 sq mi (0.613 km^{2})
  - Land: 0.237 sq mi (0.613 km^{2})
  - Water: 0 sq mi (0.000 km^{2})
- Elevation: 980 ft (300 m)

Population (2020)
  - Total: 164
  - Estimate (2022): 160
  - Density: 693.2/sq mi (267.65/km^{2})
- Time zone: UTC–6 (Central (CST))
  - Summer (DST): UTC–5 (CDT)
- ZIP Code: 56522
- Area code: 218
- FIPS code: 27-09496
- GNIS feature ID: 2393724
- Sales tax: 6.875%

Campbell is a city in Wilkin County, Minnesota, United States. The population was 164 at the 2020 census. It is part of the Wahpeton, ND-MN Micropolitan Statistical Area.

== History ==
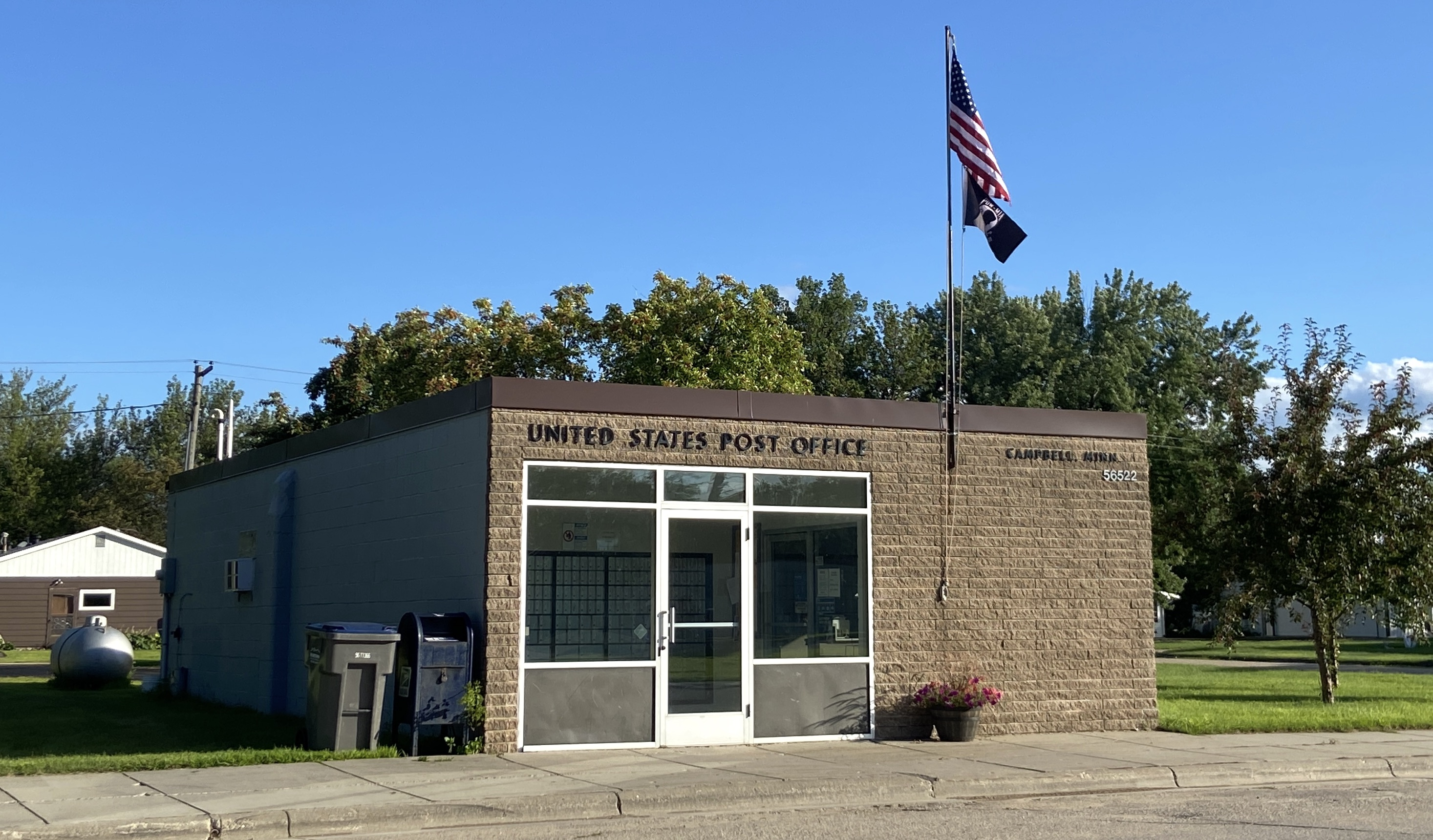
US Post Office, Campbell, Minnesota

Campbell was laid out in 1871. A post office has been in operation at Campbell since 1873.

== Geography ==
According to the United States Census Bureau, the city has a total area of 0.237 square miles (0.61 km^{2}), all land.

Minnesota State Highway 9 serves as a main route in the community.

== Demographics ==
Historical population
Census	Pop.	Note	%±
1900	239		—
1910	303		26.8%
1920	424		39.9%
1930	313		−26.2%
1940	328		4.8%
1950	391		19.2%
1960	365		−6.6%
1970	339		−7.1%
1980	286		−15.6%
1990	233		−18.5%
2000	241		3.4%
2010	158		−34.4%
2020	164		3.8%
2022 (est.)	160		−2.4%
U.S. Decennial Census; 2020 Census

=== 2010 census ===
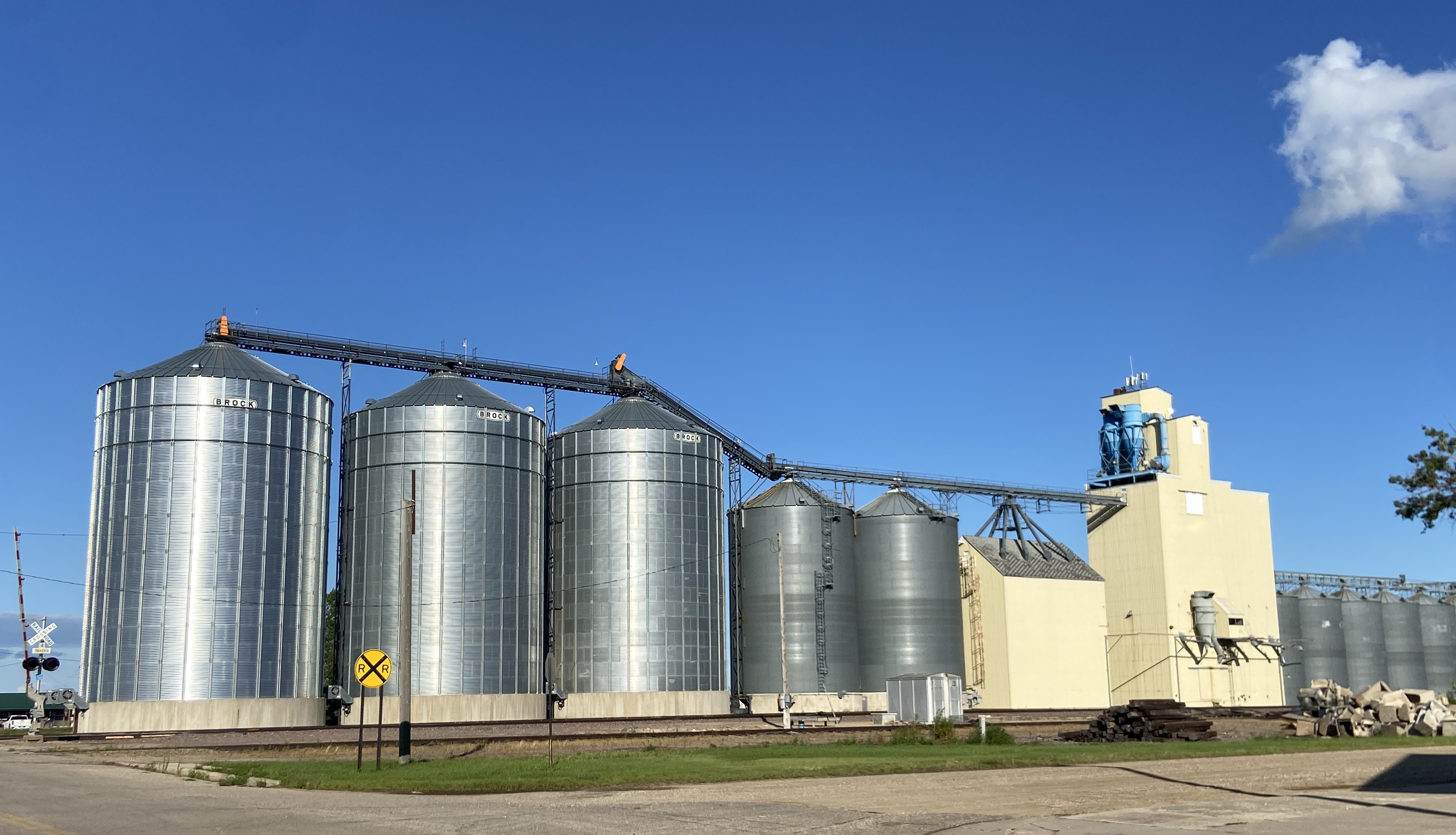
Grain Elevators, Campbell, Minnesota

As of the 2010 census, there were 158 people, 72 households, and 45 families living in the city. The population density was 658.3 inhabitants per square mile (254.2/km^{2}). There were 104 housing units at an average density of 433.3 per square mile (167.3/km^{2}). The racial makeup of the city was 98.7% White, 0.6% African American, and 0.6% Native American. Hispanic or Latino of any race were 3.2% of the population.

There were 72 households, of which 26.4% had children under the age of 18 living with them, 52.8% were married couples living together, 6.9% had a female householder with no husband present, 2.8% had a male householder with no wife present, and 37.5% were non-families. 30.6% of all households were made up of individuals, and 5.6% had someone living alone who was 65 years of age or older. The average household size was 2.19 and the average family size was 2.78.

The median age in the city was 48 years. 20.3% of residents were under the age of 18; 6.3% were between the ages of 18 and 24; 17.7% were from 25 to 44; 37.4% were from 45 to 64; and 18.4% were 65 years of age or older. The gender makeup of the city was 50.6% male and 49.4% female.

=== 2000 census ===
As of the 2000 census, there were 241 people, 95 households, and 60 families living in the city. The population density was 1,020.0 inhabitants per square mile (393.8/km^{2}). There were 110 housing units at an average density of 465.6 per square mile (179.8/km^{2}). The racial makeup of the city was 94.19% White, 0.83% African American, 1.66% Native American, 3.32% from other races. Hispanic or Latino of any race were 4.56% of the population.

There were 95 households, out of which 32.6% had children under the age of 18 living with them, 50.5% were married couples living together, 8.4% had a female householder with no husband present, and 36.8% were non-families. 30.5% of all households were made up of individuals, and 10.5% had someone living alone who was 65 years of age or older. The average household size was 2.54 and the average family size was 3.28.

In the city, the population was spread out, with 31.1% under the age of 18, 7.1% from 18 to 24, 27.0% from 25 to 44, 23.2% from 45 to 64, and 11.6% who were 65 years of age or older. The median age was 36 years. For every 100 females, there were 106.0 males. For every 100 females age 18 and over, there were 102.4 males.

The median income for a household in the city was $31,458, and the median income for a family was $37,500. Males had a median income of $27,083 versus $16,250 for females. The per capita income for the city was $15,128. About 9.7% of families and 14.2% of the population were below the poverty line, including 24.6% of those under the age of eighteen and 5.7% of those 65 or over.

== Notable people ==
- Thomas D. Schall (1878–1935), U.S. Senator and U.S. Representative from Minnesota
- Errol Mann (1941–2013), NFL placekicker
