= Kent, Minnesota =

City in Minnesota, United States

- City
- Location of Kent, Minnesota
- Coordinates: 46°26′15″N 96°41′00″W
- Country: United States
- State: Minnesota
- County: Wilkin
- Incorporated: November 22, 1904

Government
  - Mayor: Anthony Olson

Area
  - Total: 0.239 sq mi (0.619 km^{2})
  - Land: 0.239 sq mi (0.619 km^{2})
  - Water: 0 sq mi (0.000 km^{2})
- Elevation: 942 ft (287 m)

Population (2020)
  - Total: 65
  - Estimate (2022): 64
  - Density: 338.0/sq mi (130.52/km^{2})
- Time zone: UTC–6 (Central (CST))
  - Summer (DST): UTC–5 (CDT)
- ZIP Code: 56553
- Area code: 218
- FIPS code: 27-32786
- GNIS feature ID: 2395513
- Sales tax: 6.875%

Kent is a city in Wilkin County, Minnesota, United States. The population was 65 at the 2020 census. It is part of the Wahpeton, ND-MN Micropolitan Statistical Area.

== History ==
A post office called Kent has been in operation since 1888. The city was named by railroad officials.

== Geography ==
According to the United States Census Bureau, the city has a total area of 0.239 square miles (0.62 km^{2}), all land.

== Demographics ==
Historical population
Census	Pop.	Note	%±
1910	238		—
1920	150		−37.0%
1930	137		−8.7%
1940	146		6.6%
1950	178		21.9%
1960	134		−24.7%
1970	139		3.7%
1980	121		−12.9%
1990	131		8.3%
2000	120		−8.4%
2010	81		−32.5%
2020	65		−19.8%
2022 (est.)	64		−1.5%
U.S. Decennial Census; 2020 Census

=== 2010 census ===
As of the 2010 census, there were 81 people, 36 households, and 24 families residing in the city. The population density was 426.3 inhabitants per square mile (164.6/km^{2}). There were 39 housing units at an average density of 205.3 per square mile (79.3/km^{2}). The racial makeup of the city was 100.0% White.

There were 36 households, of which 25.0% had children under the age of 18 living with them, 55.6% were married couples living together, 11.1% had a male householder with no wife present, and 33.3% were non-families. 25.0% of all households were made up of individuals, and 8.4% had someone living alone who was 65 years of age or older. The average household size was 2.25 and the average family size was 2.75.

The median age in the city was 42.3 years. 22.2% of residents were under the age of 18; 2.6% were between the ages of 18 and 24; 30.8% were from 25 to 44; 33.3% were from 45 to 64; and 11.1% were 65 years of age or older. The gender makeup of the city was 54.3% male and 45.7% female.

=== 2000 census ===
As of the 2000 census, there were 120 people, 41 households, and 28 families residing in the city. The population density was 624.2 inhabitants per square mile (241.0/km^{2}). There were 47 housing units at an average density of 244.5 per square mile (94.4/km^{2}). The racial makeup of the city was 95.83% White, 0.83% from other races, and 3.33% from two or more races. Hispanic or Latino of any race were 7.50% of the population.

There were 41 households, out of which 39.0% had children under the age of 18 living with them, 48.8% were married couples living together, 7.3% had a female householder with no husband present, and 31.7% were non-families. 26.8% of all households were made up of individuals, and 12.2% had someone living alone who was 65 years of age or older. The average household size was 2.93 and the average family size was 3.46.

In the city, the population was spread out, with 39.2% under the age of 18, 7.5% from 18 to 24, 25.8% from 25 to 44, 17.5% from 45 to 64, and 10.0% who were 65 years of age or older. The median age was 28 years. For every 100 females, there were 114.3 males. For every 100 females age 18 and over, there were 121.2 males.

The median income for a household in the city was $30,417, and the median income for a family was $36,875. Males had a median income of $24,375 versus $20,750 for females. The per capita income for the city was $10,595. There were no families and 4.7% of the population living below the poverty line, including no under eighteens and none of those over 64.
