= Hankinson, North Dakota =

- City
- Motto(s): "Honoring Our Past; Charting Our Future", "It happens here."
- Interactive map of Hankinson, North Dakota
- Location within North Dakota
- Coordinates: 46.0741°N 96.8910°W
- Country: United States
- State: North Dakota
- County: Richland
- Founded: 1886
- Founded by: R. H. Hankinson

Government
  - Type: Mayor–council
  - Mayor: Jordan Krump
  - President: Jeremy Steffens
  - Vice president: Joel Bladow
  - Councilmembers: Michelle Roeder; Sarah Pearson; Jeremy Post; Mason Falk

Area
  - Total: 1.874 sq mi (4.854 km^{2})
  - Land: 1.859 sq mi (4.814 km^{2})
  - Water: 0.015 sq mi (0.040 km^{2}) 0.80%
- Elevation: 1,060 ft (323 m)

Population (2020)
  - Total: 921
  - Estimate (2025): 936
  - Density: 496/sq mi (191/km^{2})
- Time zone: UTC–6 (Central (CST))
  - Summer (DST): UTC–5 (CDT)
- ZIP Code: 58041
- Area code: 701
- FIPS code: 38-34900
- GNIS feature ID: 1036077
- Highways: ND 11
- Website: hankinsonnd.com

Hankinson is a city in Richland County, North Dakota, United States. The population was 921 as of the 2020 census, and was estimated at 936 in 2025. It is part of the Wahpeton, ND–MN Micropolitan Statistical Area.

== History ==
Hankinson was founded in 1886. A post office has been in operation at Hankinson since 1886. The city was named after R. H. Hankinson, a local land owner.

== Geography ==
According to the United States Census Bureau, the city has a total area of 1.874 square miles (4.85 km^{2}), of which 1.859 square miles (4.81 km^{2}) is land and 0.015 square miles (0.04 km^{2}) (0.80%) is water.

== Climate ==
This climatic region is typified by large seasonal temperature differences, with warm to hot (and often humid) summers and cold (sometimes severely cold) winters. According to the Köppen Climate Classification system, Hankinson has a humid continental climate, abbreviated "Dfb" on climate maps.

== Demographics ==
Historical population
Census	Pop.	Note	%±
1900	713		—
1910	1,503		110.8%
1920	1,477		−1.7%
1930	1,400		−5.2%
1940	1,420		1.4%
1950	1,409		−0.8%
1960	1,285		−8.8%
1970	1,125		−12.5%
1980	1,158		2.9%
1990	1,038		−10.4%
2000	1,058		1.9%
2010	919		−13.1%
2020	921		0.2%
2025 (est.)	936		1.6%
U.S. Decennial Census; 2020 Census

According to realtor website Zillow, the average price of a home as of June 30, 2026, in Hankinson was $176,850.

As of the 2024 American Community Survey, there were 334 estimated households in Hankinson with an average of 2.24 persons per household. The city has a median household income of $74,643. Approximately 6.7% of the city's population lives at or below the poverty line. Hankinson has an estimated 53.8% employment rate, with 21.0% of the population holding a bachelor's degree or higher and 93.7% holding a high school diploma. There were 425 housing units at an average density of 228.62 per square mile (88.3/km^{2}).

The top five reported languages (people were allowed to report up to two languages, thus the figures will generally add to more than 100%) were English (98.4%), Spanish (0.5%), Indo-European (0.5%), Asian and Pacific Islander (0.0%), and Other (0.5%).

The median age in the city was 46.3 years.

Hankinson, North Dakota – racial and ethnic composition Note: the US Census treats Hispanic/Latino as an ethnic category. This table excludes Latinos from the racial categories and assigns them to a separate category. Hispanics/Latinos may be of any race.
Race / ethnicity (NH = non-Hispanic)	Pop. 1990	Pop. 2000	Pop. 2010	Pop. 2020	% 1990	% 2000	% 2010	% 2020
White alone (NH)	1032	993	847	849	99.42%	93.86%	92.17%	92.18%
Black or African American alone (NH)	0	0	0	4	0.00%	0.00%	0.00%	0.43%
Native American or Alaska Native alone (NH)	1	34	30	19	0.10%	3.21%	3.26%	2.06%
Asian alone (NH)	3	1	0	0	0.29%	0.09%	0.00%	0.00%
Pacific Islander alone (NH)	—	2	1	0	—	0.19%	0.11%	0.00%
Other race alone (NH)	0	0	0	4	0.00%	0.00%	0.00%	0.43%
Mixed race or multiracial (NH)	—	12	15	25	—	1.13%	1.63%	2.71%
Hispanic or Latino (any race)	2	16	26	20	0.19%	1.51%	2.83%	2.17%
Total	1,038	1,058	919	921	100.00%	100.00%	100.00%	100.00%

=== 2020 census ===
As of the 2020 census, there were 921 people, 384 households, 233 families residing in the city. The population density was 495.69 inhabitants per square mile (191.4/km^{2}). There were 452 housing units at an average density of 243.27 per square mile (93.9/km^{2}). The racial makeup of the city was 93.05% White, 0.43% African American, 2.06% Native American, 0.00% Asian, 0.00% Pacific Islander, 0.98% from some other races and 3.47% from two or more races. Hispanic or Latino people of any race were 2.17% of the population.

=== 2010 census ===
As of the 2010 census, there were 919 people, 406 households, 228 families residing in the city. The population density was 576.90 inhabitants per square mile (222.7/km^{2}). There were 501 housing units at an average density of 314.50 per square mile (121.4/km^{2}). The racial makeup of the city was 93.80% White, 0.00% African American, 9.14% Native American, 0.00% Asian, 0.11% Pacific Islander, 0.54% from some other races and 1.85% from two or more races. Hispanic or Latino people of any race were 2.83% of the population.

There were 406 households, of which 23.4% had children under the age of 18 living with them, 44.1% were married couples living together, 8.1% had a female householder with no husband present, 3.9% had a male householder with no wife present, and 43.8% were non-families. 36.9% of all households were made up of individuals, and 18% had someone living alone who was 65 years of age or older. The average household size was 2.12 and the average family size was 2.79.

The median age in the city was 48.2 years. 20.6% of residents were under the age of 18; 5.1% were between the ages of 18 and 24; 20.1% were from 25 to 44; 27.4% were from 45 to 64; and 26.8% were 65 years of age or older. The gender makeup of the city was 49.7% male and 50.3% female.

=== 2000 census ===
As of the 2000 census, there were 1,058 people, 454 households, 261 families residing in the city. The population density was 756.54 inhabitants per square mile (292.1/km^{2}). There were 524 housing units at an average density of 374.70 per square mile (144.7/km^{2}). The racial makeup of the city was 95.18% White, 0.00% African American, 3.21% Native American, 0.09% Asian, 0.19% Pacific Islander, 0.00% from some other races and 1.32% from two or more races. Hispanic or Latino people of any race were 1.51% of the population.

There were 454 households, out of which 25.1% had children under the age of 18 living with them, 47.4% were married couples living together, 7.7% had a female householder with no husband present, and 42.3% were non-families. 39.4% of all households were made up of individuals, and 25.3% had someone living alone who was 65 years of age or older. The average household size was 2.14 and the average family size was 2.87.

In the city, the population was spread out, with 21.6% under the age of 18, 6.0% from 18 to 24, 21.3% from 25 to 44, 20.3% from 45 to 64, and 30.9% who were 65 years of age or older. The median age was 46 years. For every 100 females, there were 83.0 males. For every 100 females age 18 and over, there were 76.2 males.

The median income for a household in the city was $28,125, and the median income for a family was $39,500. Males had a median income of $29,417 versus $17,955 for females. The per capita income for the city was $15,676. About 6.2% of families and 12.1% of the population were below the poverty line, including 7.8% of those under age 18 and 19.9% of those age 65 or over.

== Notable Person ==
- Cody Mauch - NFL Guard for the Tampa Bay Buccaneers who was raised in Hankinson and graduated from Hankinson High School in 2017.
