= Brushvale, Minnesota =

Unincorporated community in Minnesota, United States

Brushvale
- Unincorporated community
- Location within Minnesota Location within the United States
- Coordinates: 46°22′10″N 96°38′36″W
- Country: United States
- State: Minnesota
- County: Wilkin
- Elevation: 951 ft (290 m)
- Time zone: UTC-6 (Central (CST))
  - Summer (DST): UTC-5 (CDT)
- Area code: 218
- GNIS feature ID: 654618

Brushvale is an unincorporated community in Wilkin County, in the U.S. state of Minnesota.

== History ==
A post office called Brushvale was established in 1902, and remained in operation until 1954. The community was named for Joseph Brush, the original owner of the town site.
