= Cody Mauch =

American football player (born 1999)

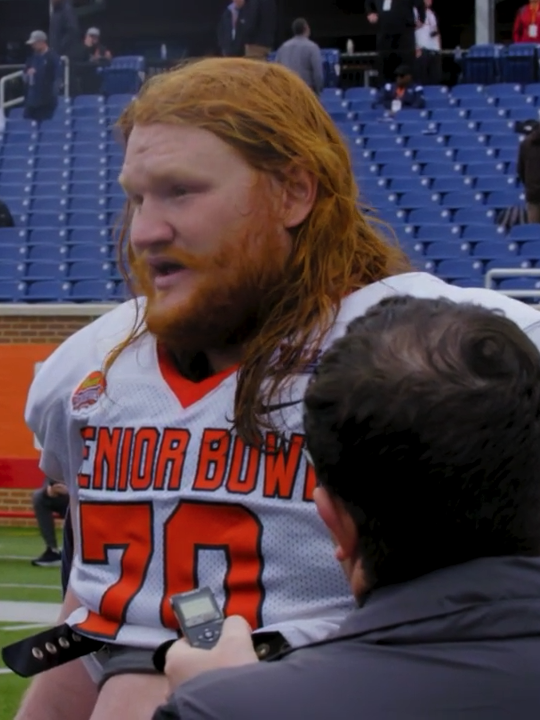
- Mauch at the 2023 Senior Bowl

No. 69 – Tampa Bay Buccaneers
- Position: Guard
- Roster status: Active

Personal information
- Born: January 15, 1999 (age 27); Breckenridge, Minnesota, U.S.
- Listed height: 6 ft 6 in (1.98 m)
- Listed weight: 303 lb (137 kg)

Career information
- High school: Hankinson (Hankinson, North Dakota)
- College: North Dakota State (2017–2022)
- NFL draft: 2023: 2nd round, 48th overall pick

Career history
- Tampa Bay Buccaneers (2023–present)

Awards and highlights
- 3× FCS national champion (2018, 2019, 2021); Consensus FCS All-American (2022); Second-team FCS All-American (2021); First-team All-MVFC (2021, 2022); Second-team All-MVFC (2020)

Career NFL statistics as of 2025
- Games started: 36
- Games played: 36
- Stats at Pro Football Reference

Cody Mauch (born January 15, 1999) is an American professional football guard for the Tampa Bay Buccaneers of the National Football League (NFL). He played college football for the North Dakota State Bison.

== Early life ==
Mauch was born on January 15, 1999, in Breckenridge, Minnesota. His parents live in Hankinson, North Dakota, where he attended Hankinson High School and played basketball, baseball, and football. When he was in the seventh grade, he lost his two front teeth while diving for a loose ball in a basketball game. He finished his high school career with 1,072 receiving yards and scored a school-record 24 touchdowns. In his senior season, Mauch had 24 catches for 474 yards and 13 touchdowns, rushed for 398 yards and four touchdowns, passed for 273 yards and four touchdowns and also had 18.5 sacks on defense in nine games. He was also named second team All-State in basketball as a senior after averaging 20 points, 15.3 rebounds, 3.2 assists, 2.5 steals, and 1.8 blocks per game. Mauch committed to play college football at North Dakota State and join the team as a preferred walk-on over a similar offer from the University of North Dakota and a scholarship offer from Division II Minnesota State–Moorhead.

== College career ==
Mauch redshirted his true freshman season at North Dakota State (NDSU) and was eventually moved from tight end to the offensive line. He played in six games as a redshirt freshman as NDSU won the 2018 FCS national championship. Mauch played in all 16 of the Bison's games during his redshirt sophomore season, appearing on special teams and also lining up at tight end in some formations to function as a sixth offensive lineman while the team repeated as national champions.

Mauch became a starter in the second game of his redshirt junior season, which was shortened and played in the spring of 2021 due to the COVID-19 pandemic in the United States. He was named second-team All-Missouri Valley Football Conference (MVFC). He was named first-team All-MVFC and a second-team All-American by the Associated Press after starting all 15 of NDSU's games as the Bison again won the FCS national title. Mauch decided to utilize the extra year of eligibility granted to college athletes who played in the 2020 season due to the coronavirus pandemic and return to NDSU for a sixth season. He was added to the watchlist for the 2022 Walter Payton Award midway through the season.

Mauch graduated from North Dakota State University with a degree in agricultural and biosystems engineering.

== Professional career ==
Pre-draft measurables
Height	Weight	Arm length	Hand span	Wingspan	40-yard dash	10-yard split	20-yard split	20-yard shuttle	Three-cone drill	Vertical jump	Broad jump	Bench press
6 ft 5 in (1.96 m)	302 lb (137 kg)	32 3/8 in (0.82 m)	9 3/4 in (0.25 m)	6 ft 6 7/8 in (2.00 m)	5.08 s	1.79 s	2.91 s	4.46 s	7.12 s	29.0 in (0.74 m)	9 ft 0 in (2.74 m)	29 reps
All values from NFL Combine/Pro Day

Mauch was selected by the Tampa Bay Buccaneers in the second round, 48th overall, of the 2023 NFL draft. As a rookie, he started in all 17 regular season games in the 2023 season. He started all 17 games in the 2024 season.

In Week 2 of the 2025 season against the Houston Texans, Mauch suffered a season-ending knee injury.
