= Mitchell Township, Wilkin County, Minnesota =

Mitchell Township, Minnesota
- Township
- Location of Mitchell Township, within Wilkin County, Minnesota

- Location within the state of Minnesota Mitchell Township, Minnesota (the United States)
- Coordinates: 46°30′27″N 96°35′53″W
- Country: United States
- State: Minnesota
- County: Wilkin

Area
  - Total: 36.4 sq mi (94.4 km^{2})
  - Land: 36.4 sq mi (94.4 km^{2})
  - Water: 0 sq mi (0.0 km^{2})
- Elevation: 961 ft (293 m)

Population (2020)
  - Total: 80
  - Density: 2.2/sq mi (0.85/km^{2})
- Time zone: UTC-6 (Central (CST))
  - Summer (DST): UTC-5 (CDT)
- FIPS code: 27-43522
- GNIS feature ID: 0665003

Mitchell Township is a township in Wilkin County, Minnesota, United States. The population was 80 at the 2020 census.

Mitchell Township was named for Charles Mitchell Corliss, a pioneer settler.

== Geography ==
According to the United States Census Bureau, the township has a total area of 36.5 square miles (94.4 km^{2}), all land.

== Demographics ==
As of the census of 2000, there were 103 people, 39 households, and 29 families residing in the township. The population density was 2.8 people per square mile (1.1/km^{2}). There were 42 housing units at an average density of 1.2/sq mi (0.4/km^{2}). The racial makeup of the township was 97.09% White, 0.97% Native American, and 1.94% from two or more races. Hispanic or Latino of any race were 0.97% of the population.

There were 39 households, out of which 38.5% had children under the age of 18 living with them, 61.5% were married couples living together, 5.1% had a female householder with no husband present, and 23.1% were non-families. 20.5% of all households were made up of individuals, and 7.7% had someone living alone who was 65 years of age or older. The average household size was 2.64 and the average family size was 2.97.

In the township the population was spread out, with 30.1% under the age of 18, 3.9% from 18 to 24, 33.0% from 25 to 44, 18.4% from 45 to 64, and 14.6% who were 65 years of age or older. The median age was 38 years. For every 100 females, there were 94.3 males. For every 100 females age 18 and over, there were 105.7 males.

The median income for a household in the township was $36,875, and the median income for a family was $55,000. Males had a median income of $46,250 versus $20,000 for females. The per capita income for the township was $21,974. There were no families and 5.3% of the population living below the poverty line, including no under eighteens and 15.4% of those over 64.
