= Brandrup Township, Wilkin County, Minnesota =

Brandrup Township, Minnesota
- Township
- Location of Brandrup Township, within Wilkin County, Minnesota

- Location within the state of Minnesota Brandrup Township, Minnesota (the United States)
- Coordinates: 46°9′34″N 96°28′57″W
- Country: United States
- State: Minnesota
- County: Wilkin

Area
  - Total: 54.2 sq mi (140.3 km^{2})
  - Land: 54.2 sq mi (140.3 km^{2})
  - Water: 0 sq mi (0.0 km^{2})
- Elevation: 974 ft (297 m)

Population (2020)
  - Total: 144
  - Density: 2.66/sq mi (1.03/km^{2})
- Time zone: UTC-6 (Central (CST))
  - Summer (DST): UTC-5 (CDT)
- FIPS code: 27-07372
- GNIS feature ID: 0663653

Brandrup Township is a township in Wilkin County, Minnesota, United States. The population was 144 at the 2020 census.

Brandrup Township was named for Andrew Brandrup, an early settler who went to become a county official.

== Geography ==
According to the United States Census Bureau, the township has a total area of 54.2 square miles (140 km^{2}), of which 54.2 square miles (140 km^{2}) is land and 0.04 square miles (0.10 km^{2}) (0.04%) is water. The township contains one property listed on the National Register of Historic Places, the Stiklestad United Lutheran Church, completed in 1898.

== Demographics ==
As of the census of 2000, there were 172 people, 55 households, and 49 families residing in the township. The population density was 3.2 inhabitants per square mile (1.2/km^{2}). There were 61 housing units at an average density of 1.1 per square mile (0.42/km^{2}). The racial makeup of the township was 99.42% White, and 0.58% from two or more races.

There were 55 households, out of which 47.3% had children under the age of 18 living with them, 83.6% were married couples living together, 5.5% had a female householder with no husband present, and 10.9% were non-families. 5.5% of all households were made up of individuals, and 3.6% had someone living alone who was 65 years of age or older. The average household size was 3.13 and the average family size was 3.31.

In the township the population was spread out, with 34.3% under the age of 18, 2.3% from 18 to 24, 30.2% from 25 to 44, 21.5% from 45 to 64, and 11.6% who were 65 years of age or older. The median age was 36 years. For every 100 females, there were 95.5 males. For every 100 females age 18 and over, there were 105.5 males.

The median income for a household in the township was $43,333, and the median income for a family was $44,167. Males had a median income of $30,625 versus $20,938 for females. The per capita income for the township was $14,720. None of the population or families were below the poverty line.
