= Wolverton Township, Wilkin County, Minnesota =

Wolverton Township, Minnesota
- Township
- Location of Wolverton Township, within Wilkin County, Minnesota

- Location within the state of Minnesota Wolverton Township, Minnesota (the United States)
- Coordinates: 46°35′58″N 96°42′58″W
- Country: United States
- State: Minnesota
- County: Wilkin

Area
  - Total: 29.7 sq mi (77.0 km^{2})
  - Land: 29.7 sq mi (77.0 km^{2})
  - Water: 0 sq mi (0.0 km^{2})
- Elevation: 925 ft (282 m)

Population (2020)
  - Total: 96
  - Density: 3.2/sq mi (1.2/km^{2})
- Time zone: UTC-6 (Central (CST))
  - Summer (DST): UTC-5 (CDT)
- ZIP code: 56594
- Area code: 218
- FIPS code: 27-71410
- GNIS feature ID: 0666038

Wolverton Township is a township in Wilkin County, Minnesota, United States. The population was 96 at the 2020 census.

Wolverton Township was named for Dr. W. D. Wolverton, a local physician.

== Geography ==
According to the United States Census Bureau, the township has a total area of 29.7 square miles (76.9 km^{2}), all land.

== Demographics ==
As of the census of 2000, there were 130 people, 50 households, and 43 families residing in the township. The population density was 4.4 people per square mile (1.7/km^{2}). There were 51 housing units at an average density of 1.7/sq mi (0.7/km^{2}). The racial makeup of the township was 98.46% White and 1.54% Asian.

There were 50 households, out of which 30.0% had children under the age of 18 living with them, 78.0% were married couples living together, 4.0% had a female householder with no husband present, and 14.0% were non-families. 14.0% of all households were made up of individuals, and 8.0% had someone living alone who was 65 years of age or older. The average household size was 2.60 and the average family size was 2.86.

In the township the population was spread out, with 23.1% under the age of 18, 6.2% from 18 to 24, 26.2% from 25 to 44, 26.2% from 45 to 64, and 18.5% who were 65 years of age or older. The median age was 42 years. For every 100 females, there were 103.1 males. For every 100 females age 18 and over, there were 104.1 males.

The median income for a household in the township was $42,500, and the median income for a family was $42,500. Males had a median income of $28,750 versus $22,500 for females. The per capita income for the township was $18,638. None of the population and none of the families were below the poverty line.
