= Nilsen Township, Wilkin County, Minnesota =

Nilsen Township, Minnesota
- Township
- Location of Nilsen Township, within Wilkin County, Minnesota

- Location within the state of Minnesota Nilsen Township, Minnesota (the United States)
- Coordinates: 46°19′7″N 96°27′20″W
- Country: United States
- State: Minnesota
- County: Wilkin

Area
  - Total: 36.2 sq mi (93.7 km^{2})
  - Land: 36.2 sq mi (93.7 km^{2})
  - Water: 0 sq mi (0.0 km^{2})
- Elevation: 978 ft (298 m)

Population (2020)
  - Total: 51
  - Density: 1.4/sq mi (0.54/km^{2})
- Time zone: UTC-6 (Central (CST))
  - Summer (DST): UTC-5 (CDT)
- FIPS code: 27-46276
- GNIS feature ID: 0665124

Nilsen Township is a township in Wilkin County, Minnesota, United States. The population was 51 at the 2020 census.

== Geography ==
According to the United States Census Bureau, the township has a total area of 36.2 square miles (93.7 km^{2}), all land.

== Demographics ==
As of the census of 2000, there were 59 people, 21 households, and 17 families residing in the township. The population density was 1.6 people per square mile (0.6/km^{2}). There were 31 housing units at an average density of 0.9/sq mi (0.3/km^{2}). The racial makeup of the township was 100.00% White.

There were 21 households, out of which 38.1% had children under the age of 18 living with them, 85.7% were married couples living together, and 14.3% were non-families. 14.3% of all households were made up of individuals, and 9.5% had someone living alone who was 65 years of age or older. The average household size was 2.81 and the average family size was 3.11.

In the township the population was spread out, with 28.8% under the age of 18, 3.4% from 18 to 24, 25.4% from 25 to 44, 27.1% from 45 to 64, and 15.3% who were 65 years of age or older. The median age was 40 years. For every 100 females, there were 110.7 males. For every 100 females age 18 and over, there were 121.1 males.

The median income for a household in the township was $81,111, and the median income for a family was $51,250. Males had a median income of $70,625 versus $19,000 for females. The per capita income for the township was $38,902. There were 13.3% of families and 9.1% of the population living below the poverty line, including no under eighteens and none of those over 64.
