= Everdell, Minnesota =

Unincorporated community in Minnesota, United States

Everdell
- Unincorporated community
- Location within Minnesota Location within the United States
- Coordinates: 46°16′03″N 96°24′29″W
- Country: United States
- State: Minnesota
- County: Wilkin
- Elevation: 991 ft (302 m)
- Time zone: UTC-6 (Central (CST))
  - Summer (DST): UTC-5 (CDT)
- Area code: 218
- GNIS feature ID: 643450

Everdell is an unincorporated community in Wilkin County, in the U.S. state of Minnesota.

== History ==
A post office called Everdell was established in 1898, and remained in operation until 1933. The community was named for Lyman B. Everdell, a local attorney.
