= Bradford Township, Wilkin County, Minnesota =

Bradford Township, Minnesota
- Township
- Location of Bradford Township, within Wilkin County, Minnesota

- Location within the state of Minnesota Bradford Township, Minnesota (the United States)
- Coordinates: 46°8′41″N 96°19′39″W
- Country: United States
- State: Minnesota
- County: Wilkin

Area
  - Total: 35.5 sq mi (92.0 km^{2})
  - Land: 35.5 sq mi (92.0 km^{2})
  - Water: 0 sq mi (0.0 km^{2})
- Elevation: 997 ft (304 m)

Population (2020)
  - Total: 78
  - Density: 2.2/sq mi (0.85/km^{2})
- Time zone: UTC-6 (Central (CST))
  - Summer (DST): UTC-5 (CDT)
- FIPS code: 27-07264
- GNIS feature ID: 0663647

Bradford Township is a township in Wilkin County, Minnesota, United States. The population was 78 at the 2020 census.

Bradford Township was named for a local landowner.

== Geography ==
According to the United States Census Bureau, the township has a total area of 35.5 square miles (92 km^{2}), all land.

== Demographics ==
As of the census of 2000, there were 119 people, 41 households, and 33 families residing in the township. The population density was 3.3 inhabitants per square mile (1.3/km^{2}). There were 46 housing units at an average density of 1.3 per square mile (0.50/km^{2}). The racial makeup of the township was 98.32% White, and 1.68% from two or more races.

There were 41 households, out of which 41.5% had children under the age of 18 living with them, 68.3% were married couples living together, 7.3% had a female householder with no husband present, and 19.5% were non-families. 17.1% of all households were made up of individuals, and 7.3% had someone living alone who was 65 years of age or older. The average household size was 2.90 and the average family size was 3.18.

In the township the population was spread out, with 33.6% under the age of 18, 5.0% from 18 to 24, 32.8% from 25 to 44, 8.4% from 45 to 64, and 20.2% who were 65 years of age or older. The median age was 37 years. For every 100 females, there were 112.5 males. For every 100 females age 18 and over, there were 97.5 males.

The median income for a household in the township was $28,750, and the median income for a family was $37,708. Males had a median income of $21,250 versus $14,375 for females. The per capita income for the township was $14,201. There were 17.9% of families and 12.9% of the population living below the poverty line, including 3.1% of under eighteens and 7.1% of those over 64.
