= Childs, Minnesota =

Unincorporated community in Minnesota, United States

Childs
- Unincorporated community
- Location within Minnesota Location within the United States
- Coordinates: 46°03′56″N 96°32′04″W
- Country: United States
- State: Minnesota
- County: Wilkin
- Elevation: 971 ft (296 m)
- Time zone: UTC-6 (Central (CST))
  - Summer (DST): UTC-5 (CDT)
- Area code: 218
- GNIS feature ID: 654642

Childs is an unincorporated community in Wilkin County, in the U.S. state of Minnesota.

== History ==
The town of Childs was named for a local farmer, Job W. Childs, who later moved to California. The town had a post office from 1888 until 1920, and a station of the Great Northern Railway which was abandoned in 1956.
