= Atherton Township, Wilkin County, Minnesota =

Atherton Township, Minnesota
- Township
- Location of Atherton Township, within Wilkin County, Minnesota

- Location within the state of Minnesota Atherton Township, Minnesota (the United States)
- Coordinates: 46°34′53″N 96°28′34″W
- Country: United States
- State: Minnesota
- County: Wilkin

Area
  - Total: 36.1 sq mi (93.5 km^{2})
  - Land: 36.1 sq mi (93.5 km^{2})
  - Water: 0 sq mi (0.0 km^{2})
- Elevation: 978 ft (298 m)

Population (2020)
  - Total: 155
  - Density: 4.29/sq mi (1.66/km^{2})
- Time zone: UTC-6 (Central (CST))
  - Summer (DST): UTC-5 (CDT)
- FIPS code: 27-02620
- GNIS feature ID: 0663471

Atherton Township is a township in Wilkin County, Minnesota, United States. The population was 155 at the 2020 census.

Atherton Township was named for a local landowner.

== Geography ==
According to the United States Census Bureau, the township has a total area of 36.1 square miles (93 km^{2}), all land.

== Demographics ==
As of the census of 2000, there were 155 people, 56 households, and 49 families residing in the township. The population density was 4.3 inhabitants per square mile (1.7/km^{2}). There were 63 housing units at an average density of 1.7 per square mile (0.66/km^{2}). The racial makeup of the township was 99.35% White and 0.65% Native American.

There were 56 households, out of which 28.6% had children under the age of 18 living with them, 80.4% were married couples living together, and 12.5% were non-families. 10.7% of all households were made up of individuals, and 7.1% had someone living alone who was 65 years of age or older. The average household size was 2.77 and the average family size was 2.92.

In the township the population was spread out, with 24.5% under the age of 18, 5.2% from 18 to 24, 26.5% from 25 to 44, 29.7% from 45 to 64, and 14.2% who were 65 years of age or older. The median age was 42 years. For every 100 females, there were 118.3 males. For every 100 females age 18 and over, there were 105.3 males.

The median income for a household in the township was $40,750, and the median income for a family was $40,750. Males had a median income of $31,250 versus $20,938 for females. The per capita income for the township was $13,929. About 21.8% of families and 22.8% of the population were below the poverty line, including 26.9% of those under the age of eighteen and 10.0% of those 65 or over.
