= Wilkin County, Minnesota =

County in Minnesota, United States

- County
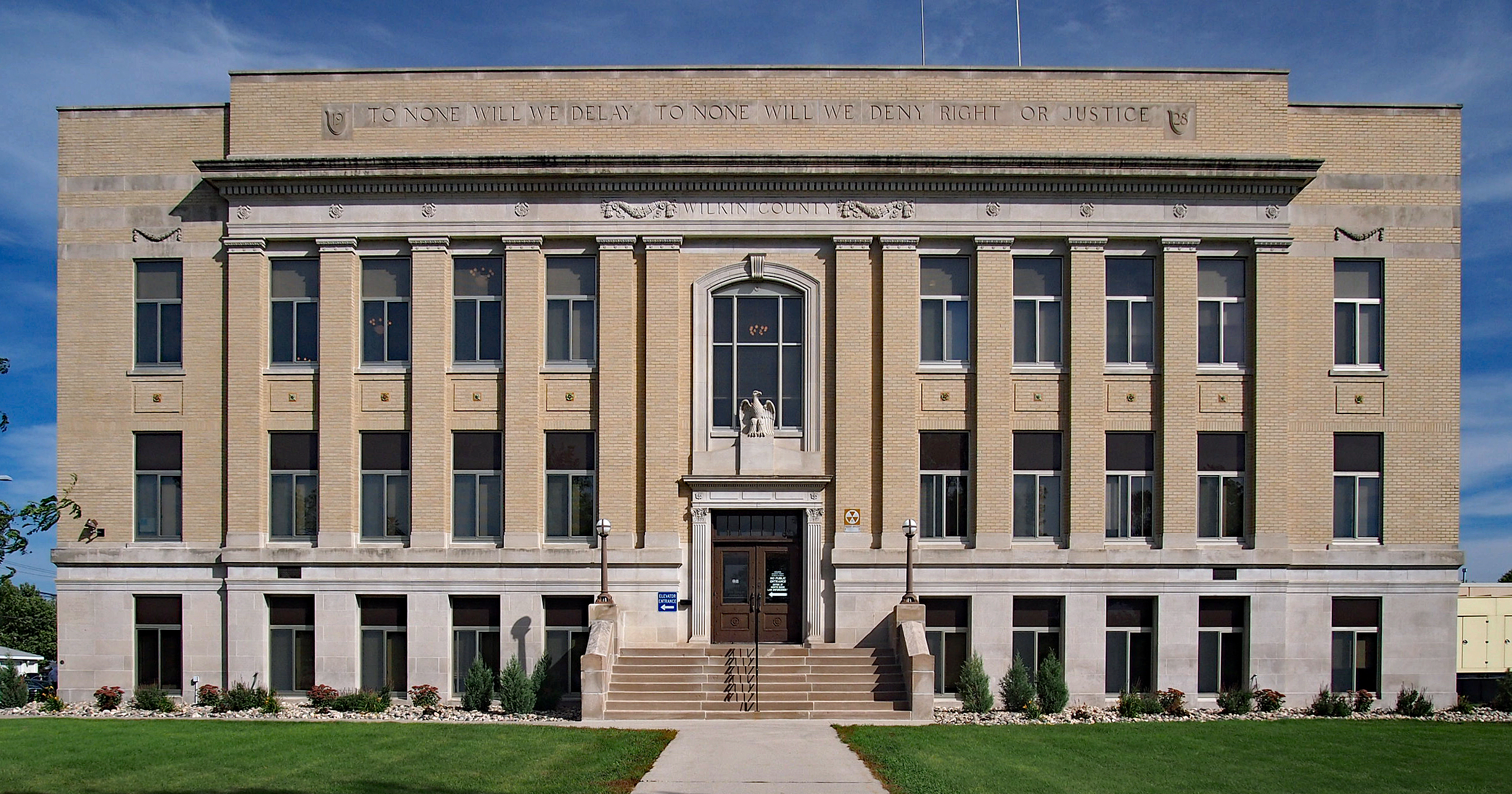
- Wilkin County Courthouse in Breckenridge

- Location within the U.S. state of Minnesota
- Coordinates: 46°22′N 96°28′W
- Country: United States
- State: Minnesota
- Founded: March 8, 1858 (created as Toombs); 1863 (renamed); March 6, 1868 (renamed)
- Named for: Alexander Wilkin
- Seat: Breckenridge
- Largest city: Breckenridge

Area
  - Total: 751 sq mi (1,950 km^{2})
  - Land: 751 sq mi (1,950 km^{2})
  - Water: 0.69 sq mi (1.8 km^{2}) 0.03%

Population (2020)
  - Total: 6,506
  - Estimate (2025): 6,288 ▼
  - Density: 8.7/sq mi (3.4/km^{2})
- Time zone: UTC−6 (Central)
  - Summer (DST): UTC−5 (CDT)
- Congressional district: 7th
- Website: wilkincounty.gov

Wilkin County is a county in the U.S. state of Minnesota. As of the 2020 census, the population of Wilkin County was 6,506. Its county seat is Breckenridge. The county is named for Colonel Alexander Wilkin, a lawyer who served as Minnesota's U.S. marshal and was later killed in the Civil War.

Wilkin County is part of the Wahpeton, ND—MN Micropolitan Statistical Area, which is included in the Fargo-Wahpeton, ND-MN Combined Statistical Area.

== History ==
In 1849, the newly organized Minnesota Territory legislature authorized the creation of nine large counties across the territory. One of those, Pembina (later renamed as Kittson), contained areas that were partitioned off on March 8, 1858, to create Toombs County, named after Robert Toombs (1810–85) of Georgia. Toombs had been a member of the US House of Representatives (1845–1853), and US Senate (1853–1861). He became the Confederate secretary of state in 1861; this disloyalty to the Union displeased county residents, who petitioned for a name change. Accordingly, in 1863, the county was renamed Andy Johnson County for Andrew Johnson, who was serving as the military governor of Tennessee at the time. However, Johnson's actions and positions as US President (1865–1869) also displeased county residents, so on March 6, 1868, the county name was again changed, to Wilkin County. It was named for Colonel Alexander Wilkin, a Minnesota attorney and secretary to the Minnesota Territory governor.

The future Breckenridge, Minnesota was settled beginning in the 1850s, and a town was platted there in the spring of 1857. Thus, when Toombs County was authorized in 1858, Breckenridge was listed as the county seat. It continued as the county seat through the subsequent county name changes.

== Geography ==
Soils of Wilkin County

Wilkin County lies on the west side of Minnesota. Its west border abuts the east border of the state of North Dakota (across a river). The Bois de Sioux River flows northward along the county's west border. The Rabbit River flows westward through the lower part of the county and discharges into the Bois de Sioux on the county's lower west border. The Otter Tail River flows west-northwestward through the central part of the county and merges with the Bois de Sioux at Breckenridge to form the Red River, which continues to flow along the county's west line northward toward the Hudson Bay in Canada.

Wilkin County terrain consists of low rolling hills, completely devoted to agriculture. The terrain slopes to the west and north, with its highest point on the upper east border at 1,250 ft (380 m) ASL. The county has a total area of 751 square miles (1,950 km^{2}), of which 751 square miles (1,950 km^{2}) is land and 0.2 square miles (0.52 km^{2}) (0.03%) is water.

=== Major highways ===
- Interstate 94
- U.S. Highway 52
- U.S. Highway 75
- Minnesota State Highway 9
- Minnesota State Highway 55
- Minnesota State Highway 108
- Minnesota State Highway 210

=== Adjacent counties ===
- Clay County - north
- Otter Tail County - east
- Grant County - southeast
- Traverse County - south
- Richland County, North Dakota - west

=== Protected areas ===
- Akron State Wildlife Management Area
- Atherton State Wildlife Management Area
- Richard M. and Mathilde Rice Elliot Scientific and Natural Area
- Rothsay State Wildlife Management Area
- Sunnyside Township State Game Refuge
- Western Prairie Scientific and Natural Area

=== Lakes ===
- Breckenridge Lake - formed by a dam on the Otter Tail River in Breckenridge Township

== Demographics ==
Historical population
Census	Pop.	Note	%±
1860	40		—
1870	295		637.5%
1880	1,906		546.1%
1890	4,346		128.0%
1900	8,080		85.9%
1910	9,063		12.2%
1920	10,187		12.4%
1930	9,791		−3.9%
1940	10,475		7.0%
1950	10,567		0.9%
1960	10,650		0.8%
1970	9,389		−11.8%
1980	8,454		−10.0%
1990	7,516		−11.1%
2000	7,138		−5.0%
2010	6,576		−7.9%
2020	6,506		−1.1%
2025 (est.)	6,288	▼	−3.4%
U.S. Decennial Census; 1790-1960 1900-1990; 1990-2000 2010-2020

=== Racial and ethnic composition ===
Wilkin County, Minnesota – Racial and ethnic composition Note: the US Census treats Hispanic/Latino as an ethnic category. This table excludes Latinos from the racial categories and assigns them to a separate category. Hispanics/Latinos may be of any race.
Race / Ethnicity (NH = Non-Hispanic)	Pop 1980	Pop 1990	Pop 2000	Pop 2010	Pop 2020	% 1980	% 1990	% 2000	% 2010	% 2020
White alone (NH)	8,373	7,405	6,912	6,294	5,918	99.04%	98.52%	96.83%	95.71%	90.96%
Black or African American alone (NH)	2	2	11	13	41	0.02%	0.03%	0.15%	0.20%	0.63%
Native American or Alaska Native alone (NH)	33	41	30	59	87	0.39%	0.55%	0.42%	0.90%	1.34%
Asian alone (NH)	26	23	10	18	8	0.31%	0.31%	0.14%	0.27%	0.12%
Native Hawaiian or Pacific Islander alone (NH)	x	x	1	0	1	x	x	0.01%	0.00%	0.02%
Other race alone (NH)	9	2	0	0	5	0.11%	0.03%	0.00%	0.00%	0.08%
Mixed race or Multiracial (NH)	x	x	64	62	235	x	x	0.90%	0.94%	3.61%
Hispanic or Latino (any race)	11	43	110	130	211	0.13%	0.57%	1.54%	1.98%	3.24%
Total	8,454	7,516	7,138	6,576	6,506	100.00%	100.00%	100.00%	100.00%	100.00%

=== 2020 census ===
As of the 2020 census, the county had a population of 6,506. The median age was 42.4 years. 23.5% of residents were under the age of 18 and 19.8% of residents were 65 years of age or older. For every 100 females there were 108.3 males, and for every 100 females age 18 and over there were 104.9 males age 18 and over.

The racial makeup of the county was 92.1% White, 0.6% Black or African American, 1.5% American Indian and Alaska Native, 0.1% Asian, <0.1% Native Hawaiian and Pacific Islander, 1.0% from some other race, and 4.6% from two or more races. Hispanic or Latino residents of any race comprised 3.2% of the population.

52.0% of residents lived in urban areas, while 48.0% lived in rural areas.

There were 2,735 households in the county, of which 27.4% had children under the age of 18 living in them. Of all households, 49.0% were married-couple households, 22.4% were households with a male householder and no spouse or partner present, and 21.9% were households with a female householder and no spouse or partner present. About 31.6% of all households were made up of individuals and 15.1% had someone living alone who was 65 years of age or older.

There were 2,972 housing units, of which 8.0% were vacant. Among occupied housing units, 76.6% were owner-occupied and 23.4% were renter-occupied. The homeowner vacancy rate was 1.5% and the rental vacancy rate was 8.1%.

=== 2000 census ===
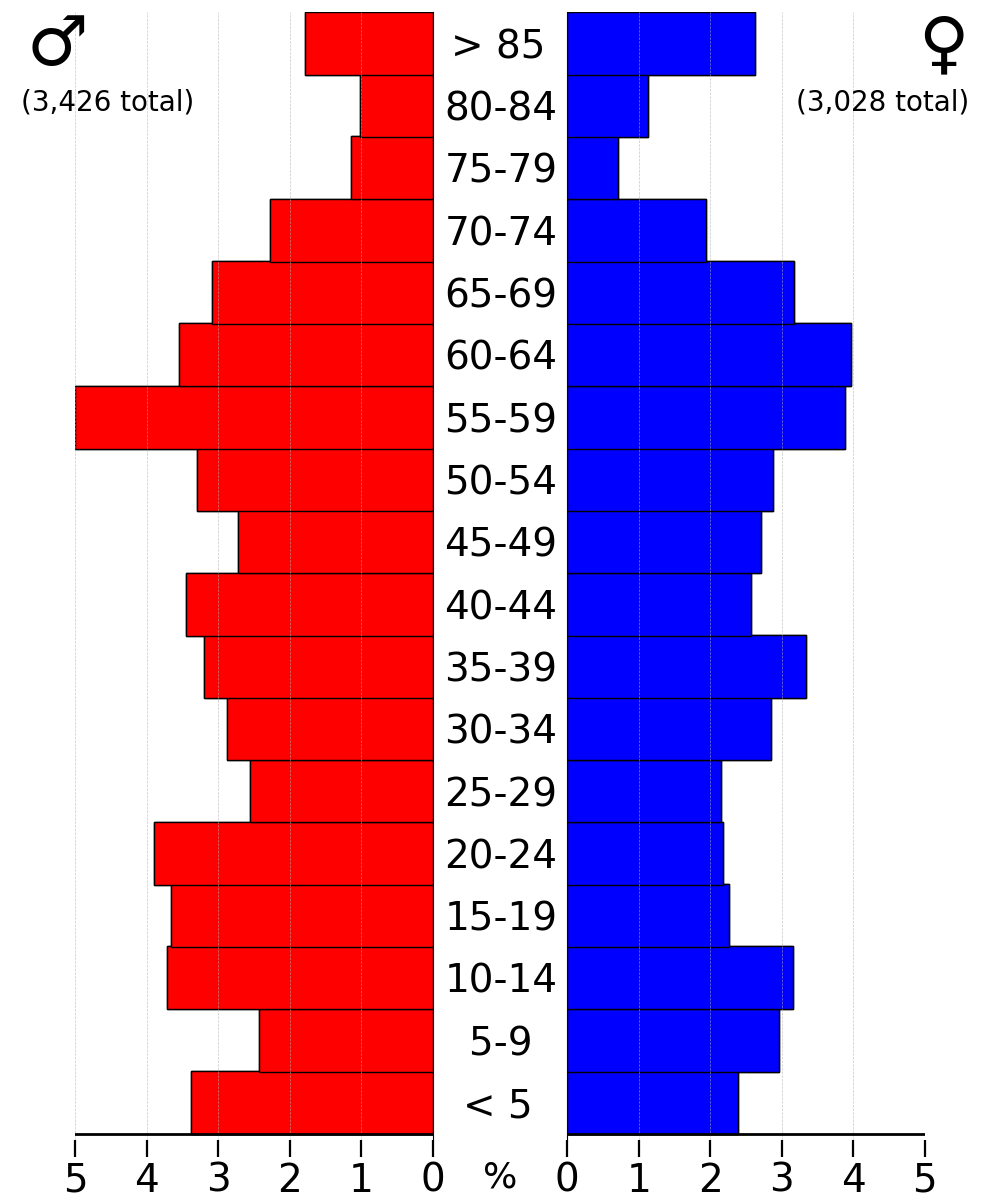
2022 US Census population pyramid for Wilkin County, from ACS 5-year estimates

As of the census of 2000, there were 7,138 people, 2,752 households, and 1,926 families in the county. The population density was 9.50 per square mile (3.67/km^{2}). There were 3,105 housing units at an average density of 4.13 per square mile (1.59/km^{2}). The racial makeup of the county was 97.77% White, 0.15% Black or African American, 0.42% Native American, 0.15% Asian, 0.01% Pacific Islander, 0.49% from other races, and 0.99% from two or more races. 1.54% of the population were Hispanic or Latino of any race. 41.8% were of German and 29.2% Norwegian ancestry.

There were 2,752 households, out of which 35.2% had children under the age of 18 living with them, 59.5% were married couples living together, 7.0% had a female householder with no husband present, and 30.0% were non-families. 25.9% of all households were made up of individuals, and 13.40% had someone living alone who was 65 years of age or older. The average household size was 2.54 and the average family size was 3.09.

The county population contained 27.8% under the age of 18, 7.0% from 18 to 24, 27.7% from 25 to 44, 21.5% from 45 to 64, and 16.1% who were 65 years of age or older. The median age was 38 years. For every 100 females there were 95.3 males. For every 100 females age 18 and over, there were 96.1 males.

The median income for a household in the county was $38,093, and the median income for a family was $46,220. Males had a median income of $31,273 versus $20,925 for females. The per capita income for the county was $16,873. About 6.2% of families and 8.1% of the population were below the poverty line, including 8.9% of those under age 18 and 8.3% of those age 65 or over.

== Communities ==
=== Cities ===
- Breckenridge (county seat)
- Campbell
- Doran
- Foxhome
- Kent
- Nashua
- Rothsay (part)
- Wolverton

=== Unincorporated communities ===
- Brushvale
- Childs
- Everdell
- Lawndale
- McCauleyville
- Tenney

Townships of Wilkin County

=== Townships ===
- Akron
- Andrea
- Atherton
- Bradford
- Brandrup
- Breckenridge
- Campbell
- Champion
- Connelly
- Deerhorn
- Foxhome
- Manston
- McCauleyville
- Meadows
- Mitchell
- Nilsen
- Nordick
- Prairie View
- Roberts
- Sunnyside
- Tanberg
- Wolverton

== Politics ==
Wilkin County voters have traditionally voted Republican. In no national election since 1976 has the county selected the Democratic Party candidate (as of 2024), and both Democratic victories since 1948 have featured a Minnesota native as the vice presidential nominee.

United States presidential election results for Wilkin County, Minnesota
Year	Republican		Democratic		Third party(ies)	
Year	No.	%	No.	%	No.	%
1892	434	42.67%	363	35.69%	220	21.63%
1896	631	41.30%	855	55.96%	42	2.75%
1900	812	52.05%	663	42.50%	85	5.45%
1904	1,103	77.30%	246	17.24%	78	5.47%
1908	779	53.03%	614	41.80%	76	5.17%
1912	209	14.47%	586	40.58%	649	44.94%
1916	690	44.20%	808	51.76%	63	4.04%
1920	2,106	75.19%	561	20.03%	134	4.78%
1924	1,342	47.17%	245	8.61%	1,258	44.22%
1928	1,874	53.90%	1,578	45.38%	25	0.72%
1932	1,126	30.75%	2,488	67.94%	48	1.31%
1936	1,278	32.45%	2,428	61.66%	232	5.89%
1940	2,067	48.65%	2,176	51.21%	6	0.14%
1944	1,945	51.51%	1,819	48.17%	12	0.32%
1948	1,700	41.87%	2,291	56.43%	69	1.70%
1952	2,979	65.39%	1,564	34.33%	13	0.29%
1956	2,335	55.36%	1,881	44.59%	2	0.05%
1960	2,340	50.14%	2,319	49.69%	8	0.17%
1964	1,636	37.26%	2,751	62.65%	4	0.09%
1968	2,037	48.91%	1,946	46.72%	182	4.37%
1972	2,292	56.00%	1,739	42.49%	62	1.51%
1976	1,882	45.79%	2,103	51.17%	125	3.04%
1980	2,224	54.15%	1,496	36.43%	387	9.42%
1984	2,367	62.36%	1,410	37.14%	19	0.50%
1988	1,933	56.08%	1,486	43.11%	28	0.81%
1992	1,626	46.32%	1,122	31.97%	762	21.71%
1996	1,508	46.83%	1,319	40.96%	393	12.20%
2000	2,032	61.48%	1,046	31.65%	227	6.87%
2004	2,303	65.30%	1,169	33.14%	55	1.56%
2008	1,786	52.31%	1,550	45.40%	78	2.28%
2012	1,884	58.47%	1,258	39.04%	80	2.48%
2016	2,129	64.48%	893	27.04%	280	8.48%
2020	2,328	67.87%	1,026	29.91%	76	2.22%
2024	2,290	68.30%	986	29.41%	77	2.30%

County Board of Commissioners
Position	Name	District
Commissioner and Vice Chair	Eric Klindt	District 1
Commissioner	Jonathan Green	District 2
Commissioner and Chairperson	Lyle Hovland	District 3
Commissioner	Rick Busko	District 4
Commissioner	Dennis Larson	District 5

State Legislature (2021–2023)
Position	Name	Affiliation	District
Senate	Torrey Westrom	Republican	District 12
House of Representatives	Jeff Backer	Republican	District 12A

U.S Congress (2021–2023)
Position	Name	Affiliation	District
House of Representatives	Michelle Fischbach	Republican	7th
Senate	Amy Klobuchar	Democrat	N/A
Senate	Tina Smith	Democrat	N/A

== See also ==
- National Register of Historic Places listings in Wilkin County, Minnesota
