= Breckenridge Township, Wilkin County, Minnesota =

Breckenridge Township, Minnesota
- Township
- Location of Breckenridge Township, within Wilkin County, Minnesota

- Location within the state of Minnesota Breckenridge Township, Minnesota (the United States)
- Coordinates: 46°14′23″N 96°33′7″W
- Country: United States
- State: Minnesota
- County: Wilkin

Area
  - Total: 21.1 sq mi (54.6 km^{2})
  - Land: 21.0 sq mi (54.3 km^{2})
  - Water: 0.12 sq mi (0.3 km^{2})
- Elevation: 965 ft (294 m)

Population (2020)
  - Total: 215
  - Density: 10.3/sq mi (3.96/km^{2})
- Time zone: UTC-6 (Central (CST))
  - Summer (DST): UTC-5 (CDT)
- ZIP code: 56520
- Area code: 218
- FIPS code: 27-07480
- GNIS feature ID: 0663658

Breckenridge Township is a township in Wilkin County, Minnesota, United States. The population was 215 at the 2020 census.

Breckenridge Township was organized in 1857, and named for John C. Breckinridge, a senator from Kentucky, fourteenth vice president of the United States, and later Confederate general and the last Confederate secretary of war.

== Geography ==
According to the United States Census Bureau, the township has a total area of 21.1 square miles (55 km^{2}), of which 21.0 square miles (54 km^{2}) is land and 0.1 square miles (0.26 km^{2}) (0.52%) is water.

== Demographics ==
As of the census of 2000, there were 234 people, 78 households, and 68 families residing in the township. The population density was 11.2 inhabitants per square mile (4.3/km^{2}). There were 86 housing units at an average density of 4.1 per square mile (1.6/km^{2}). The racial makeup of the township was 98.29% White, 1.28% from other races, and 0.43% from two or more races. Hispanic or Latino of any race were 1.71% of the population.

There were 78 households, out of which 43.6% had children under the age of 18 living with them, 83.3% were married couples living together, and 12.8% were non-families. 11.5% of all households were made up of individuals, and 3.8% had someone living alone who was 65 years of age or older. The average household size was 2.85 and the average family size was 3.09.

In the township the population was spread out, with 33.8% under the age of 18, 3.8% from 18 to 24, 29.5% from 25 to 44, 25.6% from 45 to 64, and 7.3% who were 65 years of age or older. The median age was 36 years. For every 100 females, there were 116.7 males. For every 100 females age 18 and over, there were 115.3 males.

The median income for a household in the township was $34,375, and the median income for a family was $38,750. Males had a median income of $32,321 versus $22,188 for females. The per capita income for the township was $15,068. None of the families and 3.0% of the population were living below the poverty line, including no under eighteens and 11.8% of those over 64.
