= Foxhome Township, Wilkin County, Minnesota =

Foxhome Township, Minnesota
- Township
- Location of Foxhome Township, within Wilkin County, Minnesota

- Location within the state of Minnesota Foxhome Township, Minnesota (the United States)
- Coordinates: 46°13′53″N 96°19′3″W
- Country: United States
- State: Minnesota
- County: Wilkin

Area
  - Total: 35.0 sq mi (90.6 km^{2})
  - Land: 35.0 sq mi (90.6 km^{2})
  - Water: 0 sq mi (0.0 km^{2})
- Elevation: 1,010 ft (308 m)

Population (2020)
  - Total: 104
  - Density: 2.97/sq mi (1.15/km^{2})
- Time zone: UTC-6 (Central (CST))
  - Summer (DST): UTC-5 (CDT)
- ZIP code: 56543
- Area code: 218
- FIPS code: 27-22220
- GNIS feature ID: 0664211

Foxhome Township is a township in Wilkin County, Minnesota, United States. The population was 104 at the 2020 census.

Foxhome Township was named after its largest settlement, Foxhome.

== Geography ==
According to the United States Census Bureau the township has a total area of 35.0 square miles (91 km^{2}), all land.

== Demographics ==
As of the census of 2000, there were 102 people, 37 households, and 29 families residing in the township. The population density was 2.9 inhabitants per square mile (1.1/km^{2}). There were 54 housing units at an average density of 1.5 per square mile (0.58/km^{2}). The racial makeup of the township was mostly White.

There were 37 households, out of which 35.1% had children under the age of 18 living with them, 70.3% were married couples living together, 5.4% had a female householder with no husband present, and 21.6% were non-families. 18.9% of all households were made up of individuals, and 13.5% had someone living alone who was 65 years of age or older. The average household size was 2.76 and the average family size was 3.17.

In the township the population was spread out, with 28.4% under the age of 18, 5.9% from 18 to 24, 23.5% from 25 to 44, 28.4% from 45 to 64, and 13.7% who were 65 years of age or older. The median age was 41 years.

The median income for a household in the township was $49,583, and the median income for a family was $54,063. Males had a median income of $27,188 versus $24,375 for females. The per capita income for the township was $23,049.
