= Connelly Township, Wilkin County, Minnesota =

Connelly Township, Minnesota
- Township
- Location of Connelly Township, within Wilkin County, Minnesota

- Location within the state of Minnesota Connelly Township, Minnesota (the United States)
- Coordinates: 46°20′0″N 96°34′53″W
- Country: United States
- State: Minnesota
- County: Wilkin

Area
  - Total: 24.6 sq mi (63.6 km^{2})
  - Land: 24.6 sq mi (63.6 km^{2})
  - Water: 0 sq mi (0.0 km^{2})
- Elevation: 961 ft (293 m)

Population (2020)
  - Total: 105
  - Density: 4.28/sq mi (1.65/km^{2})
- Time zone: UTC-6 (Central (CST))
  - Summer (DST): UTC-5 (CDT)
- FIPS code: 27-12970
- GNIS feature ID: 0663863

Connelly Township is a township in Wilkin County, Minnesota, United States. The population was 105 according to the 2020 census.

Connelly Township was named for Edward Connelly, a pioneer settler and afterward county official.

== Geography ==
According to the United States Census Bureau, the township has a total area of 24.6 square miles (64 km^{2}), all land.

== Demographics ==
As of the census of 2000, there were 123 people, 43 households, and 38 families residing in the township. The population density was 5.0 inhabitants per square mile (1.9/km^{2}). There were 46 housing units at an average density of 1.9 per square mile (0.73/km^{2}). The racial makeup of the township was 100.00% White.

There were 43 households, out of which 39.5% had children under the age of 18 living with them, 76.7% were married couples living together, 4.7% had a female householder with no husband present, and 11.6% were non-families. 9.3% of all households were made up of individuals, and 4.7% had someone living alone who was 65 years of age or older. The average household size was 2.86 and the average family size was 3.08.

In the township the population was spread out, with 29.3% under the age of 18, 6.5% from 18 to 24, 26.8% from 25 to 44, 25.2% from 45 to 64, and 12.2% who were 65 years of age or older. The median age was 38 years. For every 100 females, there were 101.6 males. For every 100 females age 18 and over, there were 97.7 males.

The median income for a household in the township was $58,000, and the median income for a family was $59,000. Males had a median income of $47,500 versus $21,250 for females. The per capita income for the township was $19,596. There were no families and 1.6% of the population living below the poverty line, including no under eighteens and none of those over 64.
