= Meadows Township, Wilkin County, Minnesota =

Meadows Township, Minnesota
- Township
- Location of Meadows Township, within Wilkin County, Minnesota

- Location within the state of Minnesota Meadows Township, Minnesota (the United States)
- Coordinates: 46°25′14″N 96°27′34″W
- Country: United States
- State: Minnesota
- County: Wilkin

Area
  - Total: 36.2 sq mi (93.8 km^{2})
  - Land: 36.2 sq mi (93.8 km^{2})
  - Water: 0 sq mi (0.0 km^{2})
- Elevation: 981 ft (299 m)

Population (2020)
  - Total: 53
  - Density: 1.5/sq mi (0.57/km^{2})
- Time zone: UTC-6 (Central (CST))
  - Summer (DST): UTC-5 (CDT)
- FIPS code: 27-41408
- GNIS feature ID: 0664945

Meadows Township is a township in Wilkin County, Minnesota, United States. The population was 53 at the 2020 census.

Meadows Township was named for the prairie within its borders.

== Geography ==
According to the United States Census Bureau, the township has a total area of 36.2 square miles (93.8 km^{2}), all land.

== Demographics ==
As of the census of 2000, there were 65 people, 23 households, and 20 families residing in the township. The population density was 1.8 inhabitants per square mile (0.69/km^{2}). There were 23 housing units at an average density of 0.6 per square mile (0.23/km^{2}). The racial makeup of the township was 100.00% White.

There were 23 households, out of which 43.5% had children under the age of 18 living with them, 73.9% were married couples living together, 4.3% had a female householder with no husband present, and 13.0% were non-families. 13.0% of all households were made up of individuals, and 8.7% had someone living alone who was 65 years of age or older. The average household size was 2.83 and the average family size was 3.10.

In the township the population was spread out, with 29.2% under the age of 18, 7.7% from 18 to 24, 27.7% from 25 to 44, 24.6% from 45 to 64, and 10.8% who were 65 years of age or older. The median age was 41 years. For every 100 females, there were 124.1 males. For every 100 females age 18 and over, there were 142.1 males.

The median income for a household in the township was $39,583, and the median income for a family was $39,583. Males had a median income of $40,625 versus $20,833 for females. The per capita income for the township was $20,797. None of the population and none of the families were below the poverty line.
