= Manston Township, Wilkin County, Minnesota =

Manston Township, Minnesota
- Township
- Location of Manston Township, within Wilkin County, Minnesota

- Location within the state of Minnesota Manston Township, Minnesota (the United States)
- Coordinates: 46°29′35″N 96°28′37″W
- Country: United States
- State: Minnesota
- County: Wilkin

Area
  - Total: 36.1 sq mi (93.4 km^{2})
  - Land: 36.1 sq mi (93.4 km^{2})
  - Water: 0 sq mi (0.0 km^{2})
- Elevation: 988 ft (301 m)

Population (2020)
  - Total: 41
  - Density: 1.1/sq mi (0.44/km^{2})
- Time zone: UTC-6 (Central (CST))
  - Summer (DST): UTC-5 (CDT)
- FIPS code: 27-39968
- GNIS feature ID: 0664893

Manston Township is a township in Wilkin County, Minnesota, United States. The population was 41 at the 2020 census.

== Geography ==
According to the United States Census Bureau, the township has a total area of 36.1 square miles (93.4 km^{2}), all land.

== Demographics ==
As of the census of 2000, there were 62 people, 23 households, and 18 families residing in the township. The population density was 1.7 inhabitants per square mile (0.66/km^{2}). There were 31 housing units at an average density of 0.9 per square mile (0.35/km^{2}). The racial makeup of the township was 100.00% White.

There were 23 households, out of which 30.4% had children under the age of 18 living with them, 69.6% were married couples living together, and 21.7% were non-families. 17.4% of all households were made up of individuals, and 8.7% had someone living alone who was 65 years of age or older. The average household size was 2.70 and the average family size was 3.11.

In the township the population was spread out, with 22.6% under the age of 18, 4.8% from 18 to 24, 30.6% from 25 to 44, 29.0% from 45 to 64, and 12.9% who were 65 years of age or older. The median age was 40 years. For every 100 females, there were 169.6 males. For every 100 females age 18 and over, there were 152.6 males.

The median income for a household in the township was $44,375, and the median income for a family was $45,000. Males had a median income of $40,417 versus $28,125 for females. The per capita income for the township was $14,949. There were 8.3% of families and 15.7% of the population living below the poverty line, including 35.0% of under eighteens and 14.3% of those over 64.
