= Stiklestad United Lutheran Church =

Historic church in Minnesota, United States

- U.S. National Register of Historic Places
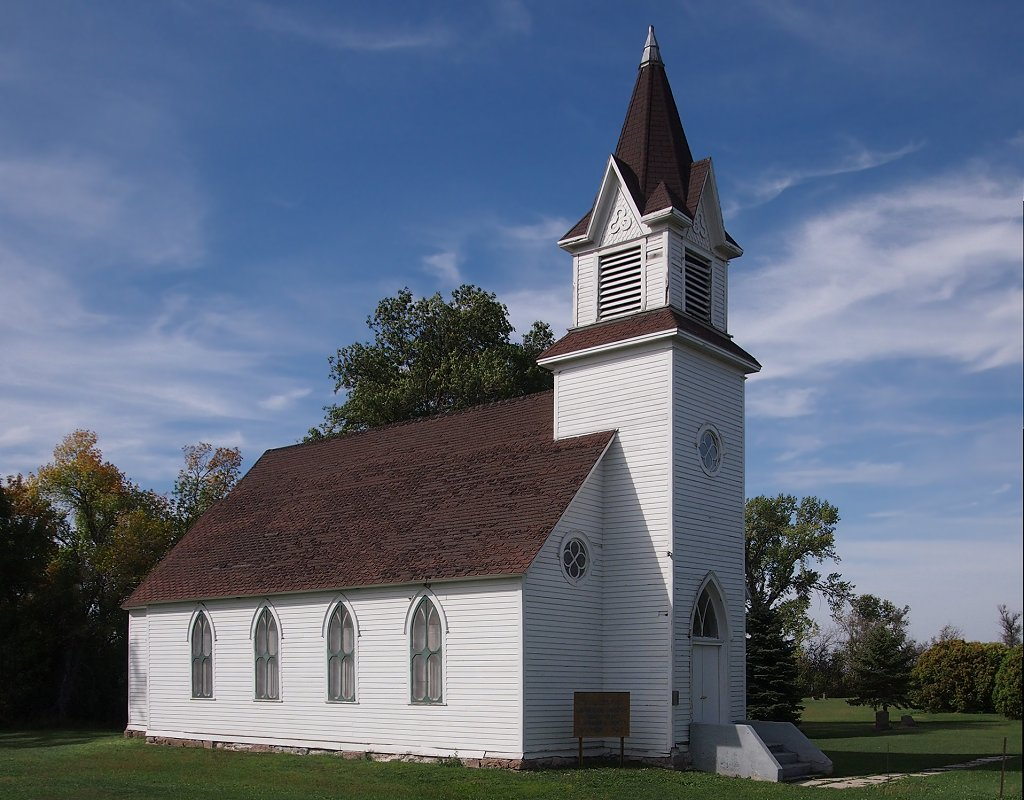
- The Stiklestad United Lutheran Church from the southeast

- Location within Minnesota Location within the United States
- Location: County Road 17, Brandrup Township, Minnesota
- Nearest city: Doran, Minnesota
- Coordinates: 46°10′38.2″N 96°24′34.4″W
- Area: 1.5 acres (0.61 ha)
- Built: 1897–98
- Built by: Sam Christenson
- Architectural style: Carpenter Gothic
- MPS: Wilkin County MRA
- NRHP reference No.: 80002183
- Added to NRHP: July 17, 1980

The Stiklestad United Lutheran Church is a historic church in Brandrup Township, Minnesota, United States, completed in 1898. It was listed on the National Register of Historic Places in 1980 for having local significance in the themes of architecture, exploration/settlement, and religion. It was nominated as a symbol of the area's Norwegian immigrants and the role religion played in the cultural persistence of this and many other European enclaves that dominated part or all of many Minnesota counties, as well as for being a well-preserved example of Carpenter Gothic church design.

== History ==
The area was settled by Norwegian immigrants mostly hailing from around Trondheim. The church was built from 1897 to 1898 by members of the congregation, with local carpenter Sam Christenson serving as contractor and foreman. The church was named for Stiklestad Church in Norway.

== See also ==
- List of Lutheran churches
- National Register of Historic Places listings in Wilkin County, Minnesota
