= Tanberg Township, Wilkin County, Minnesota =

Tanberg Township, Minnesota
- Township
- Location of Tanberg Township, within Wilkin County, Minnesota

- Location within the state of Minnesota Tanberg Township, Minnesota (the United States)
- Coordinates: 46°30′49″N 96°19′25″W
- Country: United States
- State: Minnesota
- County: Wilkin

Area
  - Total: 33.3 sq mi (86.2 km^{2})
  - Land: 33.3 sq mi (86.2 km^{2})
  - Water: 0 sq mi (0.0 km^{2})
- Elevation: 1,063 ft (324 m)

Population (2020)
  - Total: 71
  - Density: 2.1/sq mi (0.82/km^{2})
- Time zone: UTC-6 (Central (CST))
  - Summer (DST): UTC-5 (CDT)
- FIPS code: 27-64174
- GNIS feature ID: 0665761

Tanberg Township is a township in Wilkin County, Minnesota, United States. The population was 71 at the 2020 census.

Tanberg Township was named for Christian Tanberg, a Norwegian homesteader.

== Geography ==
According to the United States Census Bureau, the township has a total area of 33.3 square miles (86.2 km^{2}), all land.

== Demographics ==
As of the census of 2000, there were 68 people, 24 households, and 21 families residing in the township. The population density was 2.0 people per square mile (0.8/km^{2}). There were 33 housing units at an average density of 1.0/sq mi (0.4/km^{2}). The racial makeup of the township was 97.06% White, 1.47% Native American, and 1.47% from two or more races.

There were 24 households, out of which 41.7% had children under the age of 18 living with them, 75.0% were married couples living together, 8.3% had a female householder with no husband present, and 12.5% were non-families. 12.5% of all households were made up of individuals, and 8.3% had someone living alone who was 65 years of age or older. The average household size was 2.83 and the average family size was 2.95.

In the township, the population was spread out as follows: 29.4% under the age of 18, 30.9% from 25 to 44, 26.5% from 45 to 64, and 13.2% who were 65 years of age or older. The median age was 40 years. For every 100 females, there were 106.1 males. For every 100 females age 18 and over, there were 100.0 males.

The median income for a household in the township was $45,938, and the median income for a family was $42,188. Males had a median income of $36,563 versus $15,625 for females. The per capita income for the township was $17,429. None of the population or families were below the poverty line.
