= Deerhorn Township, Wilkin County, Minnesota =

Deerhorn Township, Minnesota
- Township
- Location of Deerhorn Township, within Wilkin County, Minnesota

- Location within the state of Minnesota Deerhorn Township, Minnesota (the United States)
- Coordinates: 46°35′54″N 96°36′15″W
- Country: United States
- State: Minnesota
- County: Wilkin

Area
  - Total: 36.0 sq mi (93.2 km^{2})
  - Land: 36.0 sq mi (93.2 km^{2})
  - Water: 0 sq mi (0.0 km^{2})
- Elevation: 948 ft (289 m)

Population (2020)
  - Total: 89
  - Density: 2.5/sq mi (0.95/km^{2})
- Time zone: UTC-6 (Central (CST))
  - Summer (DST): UTC-5 (CDT)
- FIPS code: 27-15274
- GNIS feature ID: 0663945

Deerhorn Township is a township in Wilkin County, Minnesota, United States. The population was 89 at the 2020 census.

Deerhorn Township took its name from Deerhorn Creek.

== Geography ==
According to the United States Census Bureau, the township has a total area of 36.0 square miles (93 km^{2}), all land. The township contains one property listed on the National Register of Historic Places, the early-20th-century David N. Peet Farmstead.

== Demographics ==
As of the census of 2000, there were 111 people, 40 households, and 36 families residing in the township. The population density was 3.1 inhabitants per square mile (1.2/km^{2}). There were 48 housing units at an average density of 1.3 per square mile (0.50/km^{2}). The racial makeup of the township was 95.50% White, 0.90% Asian, and 3.60% from two or more races. Hispanic or Latino of any race were 3.60% of the population.

There were 40 households, out of which 37.5% had children under the age of 18 living with them, 80.0% were married couples living together, 5.0% had a female householder with no husband present, and 10.0% were non-families. 10.0% of all households were made up of individuals, and 5.0% had someone living alone who was 65 years of age or older. The average household size was 2.78 and the average family size was 2.94.

In the township the population was spread out, with 25.2% under the age of 18, 7.2% from 18 to 24, 34.2% from 25 to 44, 24.3% from 45 to 64, and 9.0% who were 65 years of age or older. The median age was 37 years. For every 100 females, there were 105.6 males. For every 100 females age 18 and over, there were 107.5 males.

The median income for a household in the township was $45,625, and the median income for a family was $50,625. Males had a median income of $31,250 versus $21,250 for females. The per capita income for the township was $16,329. There were no families and 1.7% of the population living below the poverty line, including no under eighteens and none of those over 64.
