= Prairie View Township, Wilkin County, Minnesota =

Prairie View Township, Minnesota
- Township
- Location of Prairie View Township, within Wilkin County, Minnesota

- Location within the state of Minnesota Prairie View Township, Minnesota (the United States)
- Coordinates: 46°34′40″N 96°20′11″W
- Country: United States
- State: Minnesota
- County: Wilkin

Area
  - Total: 35.1 sq mi (90.9 km^{2})
  - Land: 35.1 sq mi (90.8 km^{2})
  - Water: 0.039 sq mi (0.1 km^{2})
- Elevation: 1,119 ft (341 m)

Population (2020)
  - Total: 228
  - Density: 6.50/sq mi (2.51/km^{2})
- Time zone: UTC-6 (Central (CST))
  - Summer (DST): UTC-5 (CDT)
- FIPS code: 27-52324
- GNIS feature ID: 0665350

Prairie View Township is a township in Wilkin County, Minnesota, United States. The population was 228 at the 2020 census.

Prairie View Township was named for its overlooks of the Red River of the North valley.

== Geography ==
According to the United States Census Bureau, the township has a total area of 35.1 square miles (90.9 km^{2}), of which 35.1 square miles (90.8 km^{2}) is land and 0.04 square mile (0.1 km^{2}) (0.11%) is water.

== Demographics ==
As of the census of 2000, there were 215 people, 73 households, and 58 families residing in the township. The population density was 6.1 people per square mile (2.4/km^{2}). There were 83 housing units at an average density of 2.4/sq mi (0.9/km^{2}). The racial makeup of the township was 98.60% White and 1.40% African American.

There were 73 households, out of which 42.5% had children under the age of 18 living with them, 69.9% were married couples living together, 4.1% had a female householder with no husband present, and 20.5% were non-families. 16.4% of all households were made up of individuals, and 4.1% had someone living alone who was 65 years of age or older. The average household size was 2.95 and the average family size was 3.33.

In the township the population was spread out, with 32.1% under the age of 18, 5.6% from 18 to 24, 30.7% from 25 to 44, 21.9% from 45 to 64, and 9.8% who were 65 years of age or older. The median age was 39 years. For every 100 females, there were 106.7 males. For every 100 females age 18 and over, there were 131.7 males.

The median income for a household in the township was $42,500, and the median income for a family was $50,938. Males had a median income of $28,500 versus $20,750 for females. The per capita income for the township was $18,038. None of the population or families were below the poverty line.
