= Akron Township, Wilkin County, Minnesota =

Akron Township, Minnesota
- Township
- Location of Akron Township, within Wilkin County, Minnesota

- Location within the state of Minnesota Akron Township, Minnesota (the United States)
- Coordinates: 46°24′21″N 96°19′58″W
- Country: United States
- State: Minnesota
- County: Wilkin

Area
  - Total: 35.5 sq mi (91.9 km^{2})
  - Land: 35.4 sq mi (91.8 km^{2})
  - Water: 0.039 sq mi (0.1 km^{2})
- Elevation: 1,053 ft (321 m)

Population (2020)
  - Total: 136
  - Density: 3.84/sq mi (1.48/km^{2})
- Time zone: UTC-6 (Central (CST))
  - Summer (DST): UTC-5 (CDT)
- FIPS code: 27-00550
- GNIS feature ID: 0663393

Akron Township (/ˈækrən/ AK-rən) is a township in Wilkin County, Minnesota, United States. The population was 136 at the 2020 census.

== Geography ==
According to the United States Census Bureau, the township has a total area of 35.5 square miles (92 km^{2}), of which 35.5 square miles (92 km^{2}) is land and 0.04 square miles (0.10 km^{2}) (0.08%) is water.

== Demographics ==
As of the census of 2000, there were 153 people, 47 households, and 42 families residing in the township. The population density was 4.3 people per square mile (1.7/km^{2}). There were 53 housing units at an average density of 1.5/sq mi (0.6/km^{2}). The racial makeup of the township was 98.04% White, and 1.96% from two or more races.

There were 47 households, out of which 46.8% had children under the age of 18 living with them, 87.2% were married couples living together, 2.1% had a female householder with no husband present, and 10.6% were non-families. 8.5% of all households were made up of individuals, and 4.3% had someone living alone who was 65 years of age or older. The average household size was 3.26 and the average family size was 3.48.

In the township the population was spread out, with 33.3% under the age of 18, 7.2% from 18 to 24, 20.9% from 25 to 44, 27.5% from 45 to 64, and 11.1% who were 65 years of age or older. The median age was 38 years. For every 100 females, there were 84.3 males. For every 100 females age 18 and over, there were 100.0 males.

The median income for a household in the township was $43,125, and the median income for a family was $43,125. Males had a median income of $28,750 versus $10,000 for females. The per capita income for the township was $15,022. About 14.6% of families and 17.7% of the population were below the poverty line, including 19.6% of those under the age of eighteen and none of those sixty five or over.
