= Champion Township, Wilkin County, Minnesota =

Champion Township, Minnesota
- Township
- Location of Champion Township, within Wilkin County, Minnesota

- Location within the state of Minnesota Champion Township, Minnesota (the United States)
- Coordinates: 46°3′45″N 96°21′33″W
- Country: United States
- State: Minnesota
- County: Wilkin

Area
  - Total: 32.1 sq mi (83.2 km^{2})
  - Land: 32.1 sq mi (83.2 km^{2})
  - Water: 0 sq mi (0.0 km^{2})
- Elevation: 994 ft (303 m)

Population (2020)
  - Total: 53
  - Density: 1.6/sq mi (0.64/km^{2})
- Time zone: UTC-6 (Central (CST))
  - Summer (DST): UTC-5 (CDT)
- FIPS code: 27-10828
- GNIS feature ID: 0663778

Champion Township is in Wilkin County, Minnesota, United States. The population was 53 at the 2020 census.

Champion Township was named for Henry Champion, an early settler who went on to become a county official.

== Geography ==
According to the United States Census Bureau, the township has a total area of 32.1 square miles (83 km^{2}), all land.

== Demographics ==
As of the census of 2000, there were 73 people, 30 households, and 24 families residing in the township. The population density was 2.3 inhabitants per square mile (0.89/km^{2}). There were 32 housing units at an average density of 1.0 per square mile (0.39/km^{2}). The racial makeup of the township was 100.00% White.

There were 30 households, out of which 23.3% had children under the age of 18 living with them, 73.3% were married couples living together, 3.3% had a female householder with no husband present, and 20.0% were non-families. 16.7% of all households were made up of individuals, and 6.7% had someone living alone who was 65 years of age or older. The average household size was 2.43 and the average family size was 2.75.

In the township the population was spread out, with 15.1% under the age of 18, 2.7% from 18 to 24, 27.4% from 25 to 44, 34.2% from 45 to 64, and 20.5% who were 65 years of age or older. The median age was 48 years. For every 100 females, there were 108.6 males. For every 100 females age 18 and over, there were 106.7 males.

The median income for a household in the township was $45,938, and the median income for a family was $46,563. Males had a median income of $32,500 versus $14,167 for females. The per capita income for the township was $15,884. None of the population and none of the families were below the poverty line.
