= Foxhome, Minnesota =

City in Minnesota, United States

- City
- Location of Foxhome, Minnesota
- Coordinates: 46°16′37″N 96°18′44″W
- Country: United States
- State: Minnesota
- County: Wilkin
- Incorporated: January 21, 1902

Government
  - Mayor: Danny Oliphant

Area
  - Total: 0.373 sq mi (0.965 km^{2})
  - Land: 0.373 sq mi (0.965 km^{2})
  - Water: 0 sq mi (0.000 km^{2})
- Elevation: 1,027 ft (313 m)

Population (2020)
  - Total: 126
  - Estimate (2022): 123
  - Density: 338.2/sq mi (130.59/km^{2})
- Time zone: UTC–6 (Central (CST))
  - Summer (DST): UTC–5 (CDT)
- ZIP Code: 56543
- Area code: 218
- FIPS code: 27-22202
- GNIS feature ID: 2394803
- Sales tax: 6.875%

Foxhome (/ˈfɒksoʊm/ FOKS-ohm) is a city in Wilkin County, Minnesota, United States. The population was 126 at the 2020 census. It is part of the Wahpeton, ND—MN Micropolitan Statistical Area.

== History ==
A post office called Foxhome has been in operation since 1896. The city was named for Robert A. Fox, a local real estate agent.

== Geography ==
According to the United States Census Bureau, the city has a total area of 0.373 square miles (0.97 km^{2}), all land.

Foxhome is located between Fergus Falls and Breckenridge on Minnesota State Highway 210.

== Demographics ==
Historical population
Census	Pop.	Note	%±
1910	206		—
1920	266		29.1%
1930	228		−14.3%
1940	240		5.3%
1950	217		−9.6%
1960	181		−16.6%
1970	185		2.2%
1980	161		−13.0%
1990	160		−0.6%
2000	143		−10.6%
2010	116		−18.9%
2020	126		8.6%
2022 (est.)	123		−2.4%
U.S. Decennial Census; 2020 Census

=== 2010 census ===
As of the 2010 census, there were 116 people, 52 households, and 32 families residing in the city. The population density was 313.5 inhabitants per square mile (121.0/km^{2}). There were 66 housing units at an average density of 178.4 per square mile (68.9/km^{2}). The racial makeup of the city was 97.4% White, 0.9% Native American, and 1.7% from two or more races.

There were 52 households, of which 23.1% had children under the age of 18 living with them, 48.1% were married couples living together, 9.6% had a female householder with no husband present, 3.8% had a male householder with no wife present, and 38.5% were non-families. 32.7% of all households were made up of individuals, and 5.7% had someone living alone who was 65 years of age or older. The average household size was 2.23 and the average family size was 2.84.

The median age in the city was 47.3 years. 20.7% of residents were under the age of 18; 6.9% were between the ages of 18 and 24; 17.1% were from 25 to 44; 38.8% were from 45 to 64; and 16.4% were 65 years of age or older. The gender makeup of the city was 55.2% male and 44.8% female.

=== 2000 census ===
As of the 2000 census, there were 143 people, 58 households, and 41 families residing in the city. The population density was 376.0 inhabitants per square mile (145.2/km^{2}). There were 65 housing units at an average density of 170.9 per square mile (66.0/km^{2}). The racial makeup of the city was 100.00% White. Hispanic or Latino of any race were 0.70% of the population.

There were 58 households, out of which 32.8% had children under the age of 18 living with them, 55.2% were married couples living together, 6.9% had a female householder with no husband present, and 29.3% were non-families. 25.9% of all households were made up of individuals, and 8.6% had someone living alone who was 65 years of age or older. The average household size was 2.47 and the average family size was 3.00.

In the city, the population was spread out, with 24.5% under the age of 18, 6.3% from 18 to 24, 29.4% from 25 to 44, 25.2% from 45 to 64, and 14.7% who were 65 years of age or older. The median age was 41 years. For every 100 females, there were 107.2 males. For every 100 females age 18 and over, there were 116.0 males.

The median income for a household in the city was $29,688, and the median income for a family was $41,250. Males had a median income of $25,000 versus $22,500 for females. The per capita income for the city was $13,654. There were 5.6% of families and 13.2% of the population living below the poverty line, including 25.7% of under eighteens and none of those over 64.
