= Nordick Township, Wilkin County, Minnesota =

Nordick Township, Minnesota
- Township
- Location of Nordick Township, within Wilkin County, Minnesota

- Location within the state of Minnesota Nordick Township, Minnesota (the United States)
- Coordinates: 46°24′10″N 96°36′10″W
- Country: United States
- State: Minnesota
- County: Wilkin

Area
  - Total: 36.2 sq mi (93.7 km^{2})
  - Land: 36.2 sq mi (93.7 km^{2})
  - Water: 0 sq mi (0.0 km^{2})
- Elevation: 958 ft (292 m)

Population (2020)
  - Total: 72
  - Density: 2.0/sq mi (0.77/km^{2})
- Time zone: UTC-6 (Central (CST))
  - Summer (DST): UTC-5 (CDT)
- FIPS code: 27-46528
- GNIS feature ID: 0665133

Nordick Township is a township in Wilkin County, Minnesota, United States. The population was 72 at the 2020 census.

Nordick Township was named for Barney and Gerhard Nordick, early German settlers.

== Geography ==
According to the United States Census Bureau, the township has a total area of 36.2 square miles (93.7 km^{2}), all land.

== Demographics ==
As of the census of 2000, there were 118 people, 41 households, and 30 families residing in the township. The population density was 3.3 people per square mile (1.3/km^{2}). There were 48 housing units at an average density of 1.3/sq mi (0.5/km^{2}). The racial makeup of the township was 100.00% White. Hispanic or Latino of any race were 2.54% of the population.

There were 41 households, out of which 43.9% had children under the age of 18 living with them, 70.7% were married couples living together, and 24.4% were non-families. 24.4% of all households were made up of individuals, and 7.3% had someone living alone who was 65 years of age or older. The average household size was 2.88 and the average family size was 3.45.

In the township the population was spread out, with 36.4% under the age of 18, 4.2% from 18 to 24, 25.4% from 25 to 44, 22.9% from 45 to 64, and 11.0% who were 65 years of age or older. The median age was 37 years. For every 100 females, there were 110.7 males. For every 100 females age 18 and over, there were 108.3 males.

The median income for a household in the township was $37,500, and the median income for a family was $45,417. Males had a median income of $30,833 versus $28,750 for females. The per capita income for the township was $15,608. None of the population and none of the families were below the poverty line.
