= McCauleyville Township, Wilkin County, Minnesota =

McCauleyville Township, Minnesota
- Township
- Location of McCauleyville Township, within Wilkin County, Minnesota

- Location within the state of Minnesota McCauleyville Township, Minnesota (the United States)
- Coordinates: 46°25′59″N 96°40′46″W
- Country: United States
- State: Minnesota
- County: Wilkin

Area
  - Total: 9.9 sq mi (25.7 km^{2})
  - Land: 9.9 sq mi (25.7 km^{2})
  - Water: 0 sq mi (0.0 km^{2})
- Elevation: 945 ft (288 m)

Population (2020)
  - Total: 58
  - Density: 5.8/sq mi (2.3/km^{2})
- Time zone: UTC-6 (Central (CST))
  - Summer (DST): UTC-5 (CDT)
- FIPS code: 27-38924
- GNIS feature ID: 0664853

McCauleyville Township is a township in Wilkin County, Minnesota, United States. The population was 58 at the 2020 census.

== Geography ==
According to the United States Census Bureau, the township has a total area of 9.9 square miles (26 km^{2}), all land.

== Demographics ==
At the 2000 census, there were 56 people, 24 households and 16 families residing in the township. The population density was 5.6 per square mile (2.2/km^{2}). There were 26 housing units at an average density of 2.6 per square mile (1.0/km^{2}). The racial make-up of the township was 100.00% White.

There were 24 households, of which 29.2% had children under the age of 18 living with them, 66.7% were married couples living together, 4.2% had a female householder with no husband present and 29.2% were non-families. 25.0% of all households were made up of individuals, and 16.7% had someone living alone who was 65 years of age or older. The average household size was 2.33 and the average family size was 2.71.

23.2% of the population were under the age of 18, 3.6% from 18 to 24, 23.2% from 25 to 44, 32.1% from 45 to 6, and 17.9% were 65 years of age or older. The median age was 45 years. For every 100 females, there were 100.0 males. For every 100 females age 18 and over, there were 104.8 males.

The median household income was $42,813 and the median family income was $44,063. Males had a median income of $28,750 and females $11,250. The per capita income was $21,842. There were no families and 5.0% of the population living below the poverty line, including no under eighteens and none of those over 64.
