= McCauleyville, Minnesota =

Unincorporated community in Minnesota, United States

McCauleyville
- Unincorporated community
- Location within Minnesota Location within the United States
- Coordinates: 46°26′30″N 96°42′28″W
- Country: United States
- State: Minnesota
- County: Wilkin
- Elevation: 935 ft (285 m)
- Time zone: UTC-6 (Central (CST))
  - Summer (DST): UTC-5 (CDT)
- Area code: 218
- GNIS feature ID: 647659

McCauleyville is an unincorporated community in Wilkin County, in the U.S. state of Minnesota.

== History ==
A post office called McCauleysville was established in 1873, and remained in operation until 1905. The community was named for its founder, David McCauley. David McCauley served as post sutler as well as postmaster and stagecoach agent at nearby Fort Abercrombie in the early 1860s and was present during the siege by the Dakota in 1862.
