= List of United States post offices in North Dakota =

United States post offices operate under the authority of the United States Post Office Department (1792–1971) or the United States Postal Service (since 1971). Historically, post offices were usually placed in a prominent location. Many were architecturally distinctive, including notable buildings featuring Beaux-Arts, Art Deco, and Vernacular architecture. However, modern U.S. post offices were generally designed for functionality rather than architectural style.

Following is a list of United States post offices in North Dakota. Notable post offices include individual buildings, whether still in service or not, which have architectural, historical, or community-related significance. Many of these are listed on the National Register of Historic Places (NRHP) or state and local historic registers. Some are also included in the multiple-site listing "US Post Offices in North Dakota, 1900--1940 MPS" from 1989.

Post office	City	Date built	Image	Architect	Notes	Ref.
United States Post Office and Courthouse (Bismarck, North Dakota)	Bismarck	1912–1913		James Knox Taylor	(Note: Listed on the National Register of Historic Places.) (Note: No longer used as a post office.)	
Carrington Post Office	Carrington	1932		James A. Wetmore, Redlinger & Hansen		
Post Office (Christine, North Dakota)	Christine	c. 1895		unknown	(Note: Building has been demolished.)	
United States Post Office and Courthouse (Devils Lake, North Dakota)	Devils Lake	1908		James Knox Taylor		
Dickinson Post Office	Dickinson	1916		James A. Wetmore		
Federal Building and U.S. Post Office (Fargo, North Dakota)	Fargo	1916		James A. Wetmore		
Grafton Post Office (Grafton, North Dakota)	Grafton	1932		James Knox Taylor		
U.S. Post Office and Courthouse (Grand Forks, North Dakota), now Ronald N. Davies Federal Building and U.S. Courthouse	Grand Forks	1908–1910		James Knox Taylor		
Grassy Butte Post Office	Grassy Butte	1914		Carl Jagol		
United States Post Office-Hettinger	Hettinger	1937–1938		Louis A. Simon, Neal A. Melick		
United States Post Office-Langdon	Langdon	1937–1938		James A. Wetmore	(Note: Houses the New Deal mural Taking Toll or Indians Demanding Wagon Toll by Leo J. Beaulaurier.)	
Lisbon Post Office	Lisbon	1939–1940		Louis A. Simon	(Note: Originally housed the New Deal artwork Family Group, a terra-cotta relief by James L. Hansen.)	
Minot Post Office, now Bruce M. Van Sickle Federal Building and U.S. Courthouse	Minot	1915		Oscar Wenderoth		
New Rockford Post Office	New Rockford	1938–1939		Louis A. Simon	(Note: Houses the New Deal mural Advance Guard of the West by Eduard Buk Ulreich.)	
Oakes Post Office	Oakes	1934–1935		Louis A. Simon		
United States Customs House and Post Office – Pembina	Pembina	1932		James A. Wetmore		
Rugby Post Office	Rugby	1940		Louis A. Simon	(Note: Houses the New Deal mural Rugby, the Geographical Center of North America by Kenneth Callahan.)	
Valley City Post Office	Valley City	1916–1917		James A. Wetmore		
Wahpeton Post Office	Wahpeton	1914		Oscar Wenderoth		
Old U.S. Post Office (Williston, North Dakota)	Williston	1915		Oscar Wenderoth		
