= National Register of Historic Places listings in Richland County, North Dakota =

Location of Richland County in North Dakota

This is a list of the National Register of Historic Places listings in Richland County, North Dakota.

This is intended to be a complete list of the properties and districts on the National Register of Historic Places in Richland County, North Dakota, United States. The locations of National Register properties and districts for which the latitude and longitude coordinates are included below, may be seen in a map.

There are 10 properties and districts listed on the National Register in the county, and two former listings.

Contents: Counties in North Dakota
Adams | Barnes | Benson | Billings | Bottineau | Bowman | Burke | Burleigh | Cass | Cavalier | Dickey | Divide | Dunn | Eddy | Emmons | Foster | Golden Valley | Grand Forks | Grant | Griggs | Hettinger | Kidder | LaMoure | Logan | McHenry | McIntosh | McKenzie | McLean | Mercer | Morton | Mountrail | Nelson | Oliver | Pembina | Pierce | Ramsey | Ransom | Renville | Richland | Rolette | Sargent | Sheridan | Sioux | Slope | Stark | Steele | Stutsman | Towner | Traill | Walsh | Ward | Wells | Williams

This National Park Service list is complete through NPS recent listings posted June 20, 2025.

== Current listings ==
	Name on the Register	Image	Date listed	Location	City or town	Description
1	Adams-Fairview Bonanza Farm	Adams-Fairview Bonanza Farm	November 20, 1990 (#90001838)	17170 82 R Street, S.E. 46°13′29″N 96°49′01″W	Wahpeton	
2	Fort Abercrombie	Fort Abercrombie	January 22, 2009 (#08001367)	Richland County Route 4; 46°26′40″N 96°43′08″W	Abercrombie	First permanent military settlement in what would become North Dakota (1858)
3	Frederick A. and Sophia Bagg Bonanza Farm	Frederick A. and Sophia Bagg Bonanza Farm	November 14, 1985 (#85002832)	Off ND 13 on Section Road, 32 RI 5; 46°15′11″N 96°51′57″W	Mooreton	
4	Leach Public Library	Leach Public Library	January 26, 1990 (#89002303)	417 Second Avenue North; 46°15′53″N 96°36′22″W	Wahpeton	
5	Red River Valley University	Red River Valley University	April 26, 1984 (#84002770)	North Sixth Street; 46°16′27″N 96°36′28″W	Wahpeton	
6	Richland County Courthouse	Richland County Courthouse	November 25, 1980 (#80002926)	Off ND 13; 46°16′03″N 96°36′23″W	Wahpeton	
7	South Wild Rice Church	South Wild Rice Church	October 22, 1982 (#82001345)	Southeast of Galchutt at U.S. Route 81 and County Road 8; 46°23′01″N 96°44′11″W	Galchutt	
8	St. Alban's Episcopal Church		December 3, 1992 (#92001607)	Southwestern corner of the junction of Hammond and Eastern Aves. 46°04′32″N 97°08′43″W	Lidgerwood	
9	US Post Office-Wahpeton	US Post Office-Wahpeton	November 1, 1989 (#89001759)	620 Dakota Avenue; 46°15′51″N 96°36′30″W	Wahpeton	
10	Wahpeton Hospital	Wahpeton Hospital	September 29, 1983 (#83001940)	720-722 Dakota Avenue; 46°15′51″N 96°36′38″W	Wahpeton	

== Former listings ==
	Name on the Register	Image	Date listed	Date removed	Location	City or town	Description
1	Nelson's Grocery	Nelson's Grocery	October 5, 1977 (#77001027)	June 24, 2025	Main and Third Streets; 46°34′28″N 96°48′22″W	Christine	
2	Post Office	Post Office	October 5, 1977 (#77001028)	June 24, 2025	Main and Third Streets; 46°34′30″N 96°48′21″W	Christine	

== See also ==
- List of National Historic Landmarks in North Dakota
- National Register of Historic Places listings in North Dakota
