= Frederick A. and Sophia Bagg Bonanza Farm =

- U.S. National Register of Historic Places
- U.S. National Historic Landmark District
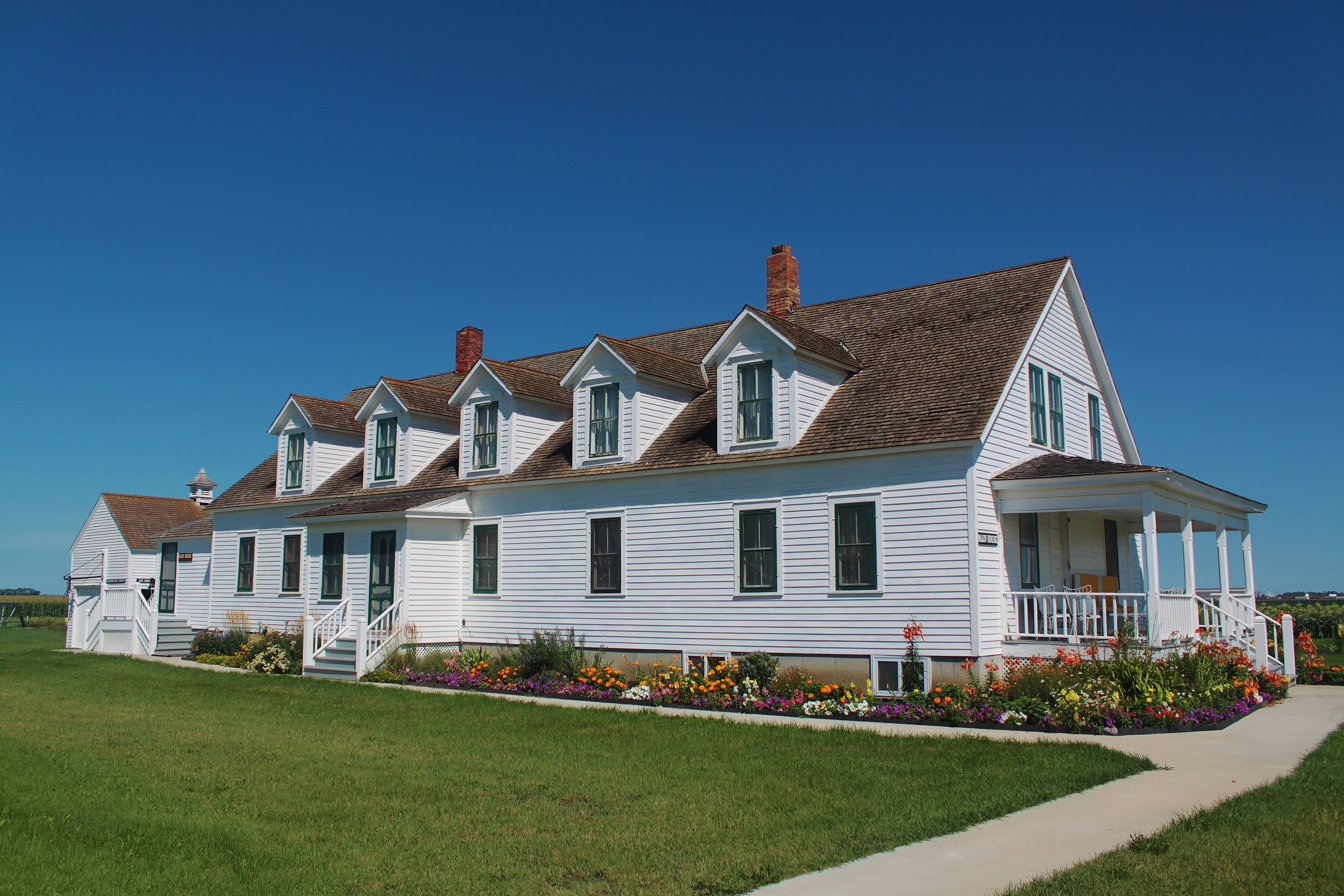

- Location within North Dakota Location within the United States
- Location: Mooreton Township, Richland County, North Dakota, USA
- Nearest city: Mooreton, North Dakota
- Coordinates: 46°15′11″N 96°51′57″W
- Area: 11.6 acres (4.7 ha)
- Built: 1915
- NRHP reference No.: 85002832

Significant dates
- Added to NRHP: November 14, 1985
- Designated NHLD: April 5, 2005

The Frederick A. and Sophia Bagg Bonanza Farm, also known as Bagg Bonanza Farm or F. A. Bagg Farm, is a former bonanza farm in Richland County, North Dakota, United States. Operated between about 1915 and 1935, the farm of the Baggs encompasses as many as 7,000 acres (2,800 ha), and was operated virtually like a factory according to modern business practices of the period. The surviving farm complex is now owned by a local non-profit organization and operates as a museum. It is one of the best-preserved examples of a bonanza farm complex in the nation, and was declared a National Historic Landmark in 2005. It is located approximately 1 mile (1.6 km) south of Mooreton.

== Description and history ==
The Bagg Bonanza Farm is located on either side of 169th Avenue Southeast in rural Richland County, east and south of Mooreton. Still surrounded by agricultural fields that were once part of the farm, the main complex consists of a large number of residential buildings and farm-related outbuildings for housing farm animals, feed, and equipment for working the land. The buildings are laid out in a roughly rectilinear manner, with walls oriented north–south and east–west. Stylistically the buildings are vernacular, and lack significant ornamentation. The main house originally served as a bunkhouse at a nearby farm where the Baggs worked before establishing this one, and was adapted by them to house their family and a number of transient farm laborers.

Frederick and Sophia Bagg were foreman and cook respectively at the Downing Farm, and in the 1890s began acquiring land in this area for their own farm. In 1915 they started this farm, which was described by Bagg as essentially a factory operation, using labor division, management, and cost management techniques from industrial business, but applied to the practice of agriculture. The farm mainly produced wheat, corn, and clover, and fluctuated in size, with a maximum documented extent of about 7,000 acres (2,800 ha). These types of large-scale operations were also made possible by the completion of railroads, which could bring their large harvests to market. The farm was divided by Frederick Bagg among his five children and two of his key personnel.

== See also ==
- List of National Historic Landmarks in North Dakota
- National Register of Historic Places listings in Richland County, North Dakota
