= Scrappy Blumer =

American pilot in the United States Army Air Forces

Laurence Elroy Blumer
- Born: May 31, 1917; Walcott, North Dakota, U.S.
- Died: October 23, 1997 (aged 80); Springfield, Oregon, U.S.
- Military career
- Allegiance: United States
- Branch: United States Army Air Forces
- Service years: 1942–1946
- Rank: Captain
- Nicknames: "Larry", "Scrappy"
- Commands: 393rd Fighter Squadron
- Conflicts: World War II
- Awards: Distinguished Service Cross; Silver Star; Distinguished Flying Cross; Purple Heart; Air Medal (23); Croix de guerre (Belgium)
- Other work: Contractor & commemorative pilot

Laurence Elroy "Scrappy" Blumer (May 31, 1917 – October 23, 1997) was an American pilot in the United States Army Air Forces during World War II. He was credited with six aerial victories, five of which he gained in a single action lasting no more than fifteen minutes on August 25, 1944, earning him the title of the "Fastest Ace in a Day".

== Early life ==
Blumer was born in Walcott, North Dakota. His father was a storekeeper and clerk, and the Blumers moved to Colfax and then Fargo where Blumer attended elementary school, then Walcott again, finally settling in Kindred where Blumer attended high school. After graduation he worked for a couple of years before enrolling at Concordia College in Minnesota. In 1941 the family moved again, to Puyallup, Washington, where his father took a job in a munitions plant.

== World War II ==
Blumer learned to fly while in Washington, and on March 23, 1942, enlisted in the Army Air Corps. After basic training, he was sent to the flight school at Luke Field, Arizona. Blumer received his wings on March 10, 1943, and was then posted to Marysville Cantonment, California, to join the 367th Fighter Group. It was at Marysville that Blumer earned the nickname "Scrappy", after holding his own against two Marines in a drunken brawl.

The 367th sailed from New York City in late March 1944 aboard the SS Duchess of Bedford, arriving in Greenock, Scotland, in early April after 11 days at sea. On arrival at their base at RAF Stoney Cross, they were surprised to discover that they were assigned to fly twin-engined P-38 Lightning fighter-bombers instead of the single-engined P-51 Mustang fighters they had trained for. This required extra training before the group was declared combat ready in early May. They were divided into three fighter squadrons: the 392nd, 393rd and 394th. Blumer was assigned to the 393rd squadron, where he named his aircraft Scrap Iron.

The 367th was heavily engaged in operations before and after the Normandy landings, and Blumer had his fair share of incidents. His aircraft was hit by anti-aircraft fire over France, and he was forced to make a belly landing back in England, wrecking it. On July 4, while attacking a train, his aircraft clipped a telephone pole, losing four feet off the port wing and knocking out one engine. He managed to nurse his aircraft back to England, only discovering on landing he had brought back 300 yards (270 m) of telephone line. On another occasion he was shot down over enemy territory, but evaded capture and made his way back to the British front lines.

Early on August 25, the 367th Fighter Group bombed three German airfields in western France. After the attack the 394th Squadron reported being attacked by around thirty Fw 190s. The 394th shot down eight German aircraft for the loss of six of their own before the 392nd and 393rd Squadrons arrived in support. Blumer, leading the 393rd, shot down two enemy aircraft on his first pass, going on to shoot down three more within fifteen minutes, before the Germans finally broke off their attack. This action earned him the title "Fastest Ace in a Day", and a Distinguished Service Cross. In the course of the battle, a total of 25 German aircraft were shot down, one probably destroyed, and 17 damaged. Two pilots of the 367th were killed, and four others bailed out.

Blumer was given command of the 393rd Squadron on November 10, and shot down his sixth enemy aircraft on November 19. He completed his combat tour in mid-January 1945, having flown 120 combat missions, and returned to the United States to serve as an instructor at Marysville.

Blumer was discharged on September 17, 1946. For his wartime service he had been awarded the Distinguished Service Cross, Silver Star, Distinguished Flying Cross, Air Medal with 22 Oak leaf clusters, and 24 other decorations.

== Post-war and later life ==
After the war, Blumer started a home construction business in Spokane, Washington. In the late 1960s he bought an ex-Honduran Air Force P-38, repainted it in the wartime colors of "Scrap Iron IV" and flew it at airshows.

Blumer died of leukemia on October 23, 1997, in Springfield, Oregon. He is buried at Woodbine Cemetery in Puyallup, Washington.

== Awards and decorations ==
His awards include:

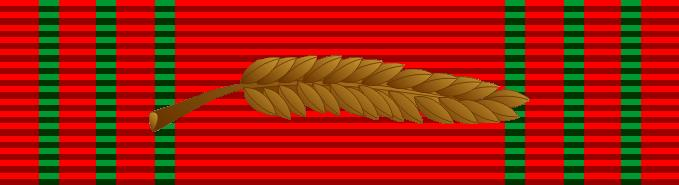
Army Air Forces Pilot Badge
Distinguished Service Cross
Silver Star
Distinguished Flying Cross
Purple Heart
Air Medal with four silver oak leaf clusters
Air Medal with bronze oak leaf cluster (second ribbon required for accouterment spacing)
Croix de Guerre with Palm (Belgium)
