= Grafton Post Office =

Grafton Post Office may refer to:

- Grafton Post Office (Grafton, North Dakota), listed on the National Register of Historic Places
- Grafton Post Office (Grafton, Vermont), listed on the National Register of Historic Places
