= Scrappy =

Scrappy may refer to:

== People ==
- Scrappy Blumer (1917–1997), American World War II flying ace
- Scrappy Carroll (1860–1942), American Major League Baseball player
- Scrappy Lambert (1901–1987), American jazz singer
- Scrappy Moore (American football) (1903–1971), American football coach at the University of Chattanooga
- Scrappy Moore (baseball) (1892–1964), Major League Baseball player
- Lil Scrappy, stage name of American rapper and record producer Darryl Richardson III (born 1984)

== Fictional characters ==
- Scrappy-Doo, a cartoon character in the Scooby-Doo franchise also known as Scrappy
- Scrappy Mouse, a Mighty Mouse sidekick in the animated television series Mighty Mouse: The New Adventures
- Scrappy the Eagle, mascot of the University of North Texas
- Scrappy (cartoon character), created by Dick Huemer for Charles Mintz's Screen Gems Studio
