= Old U.S. Post Office =

Old U.S. Post Office may refer to:

(by state then city)

- Old U.S. Post Office and Courthouse (Miami, Florida), listed on the National Register of Historic Places (NRHP)
- Old U.S. Post Office and Federal Building (Macon, Georgia), NRHP-listed
- Old U.S. Post Office (Niles, Michigan), NRHP-listed
- Old U.S. Post Office, Courthouse, and Customhouse (Biloxi, Mississippi)
- Old U.S. Post Office (Ripley, Mississippi)
- Old United States Post Office (Philadelphia, Mississippi)
- Old U.S. Post Office (Corinth, Mississippi), NRHP-listed, included in the Downtown Corinth Historic District
- Old U.S. Post Office (Williston, North Dakota), NRHP-listed
- Old U.S. Post Office (Marion, Ohio), NRHP-listed
- Old U.S. Post Office (Bend, Oregon), NRHP-listed
- Old U.S. Post Office and Courts Building (Jefferson, Texas), NRHP-listed

== See also ==
- List of United States post offices
