= Senator Benson =

Senator Benson may refer to:

== Members of the United States Senate ==
- Alfred W. Benson (1843–1916), U.S. Senator from Kansas
- Elmer Austin Benson (1895–1985), U.S. Senator from Minnesota

== United States state senate members ==
- Aslag Benson (1855–1937), North Dakota State Senate
- Carville Benson (1872–1929), Maryland State Senate
- Duane Benson (1945–2019), Minnesota State Senate
- Henry N. Benson (1872–1960), Minnesota State Senate
- Joanne C. Benson (born 1941), Maryland State Senate
- Joanne Benson (born 1943), Minnesota State Senate
- Michelle Benson (born 1968), Minnesota State Senate
- Ole E. Benson (1866–1952), Illinois State Senate
- Taylor Benson (1922–1996), Wisconsin State Senate
