= John S. Johnson (politician) =

American politician (1854–1941)

John S. Johnson (June 6, 1854 – June 23, 1941) was a member of the North Dakota House of Representatives from 1897 to 1900. He served as chairman of that chamber's Ways and Means Committee. He resided in Christine, North Dakota. He died during 1941 and was buried at South Pleasant Lutheran Church Cemetery in Richland County, North Dakota.
