= Paul Johnsgard =

American ornithologist (1931–2021)

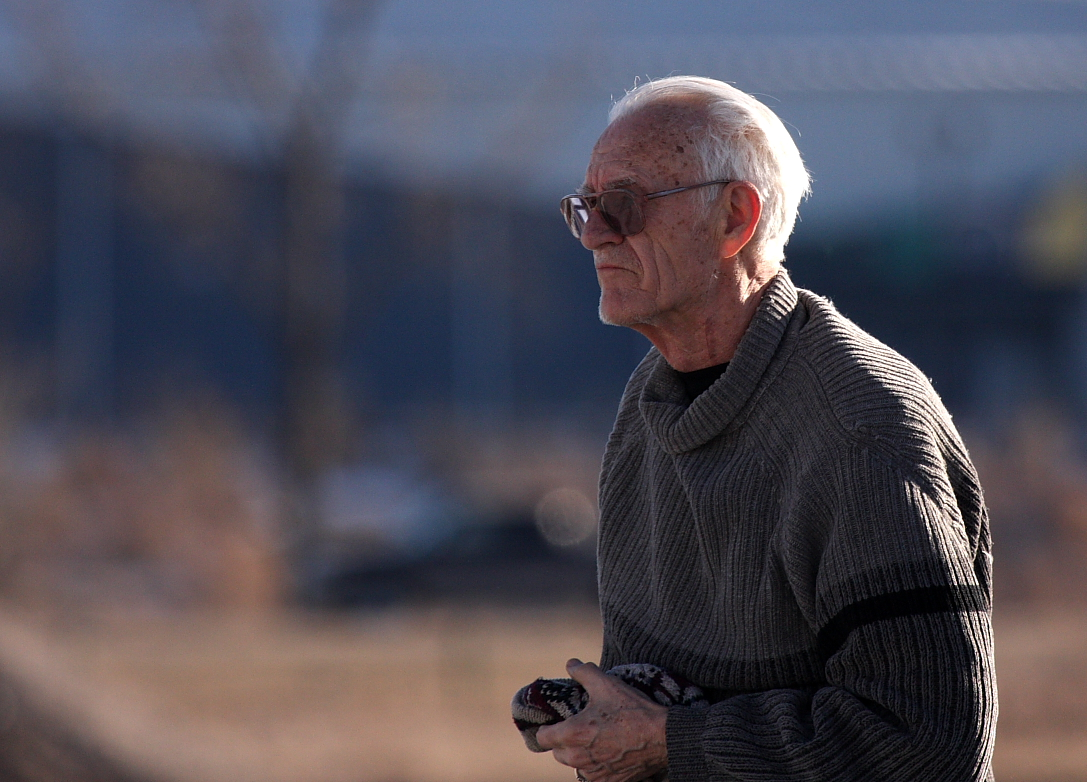
- Johnsgard in Nebraska (2011)
- Born: June 28, 1931; Christine, North Dakota, United States
- Died: May 28, 2021 (aged 89); Lincoln, Nebraska
- Education: North Dakota State University, Washington State University, Cornell University
- Known for: Numerous publications on birds and natural history
- Scientific career
- Fields: Ornithology
- Workplaces: University of Nebraska–Lincoln

Paul Austin Johnsgard (28 June 1931 – 28 May 2021) was an ornithologist, artist and emeritus professor at the University of Nebraska–Lincoln. His works include nearly fifty books including several monographs, principally about the waterfowl and cranes.

== Childhood and education ==
Born in Christine, North Dakota, a small village around 20 miles south of Fargo, he was introduced to the study of birds by a distant cousin who was a game warden. He spent these early years taking part in duck counts. After high school and junior college at Wahpeton, he enrolled at North Dakota State University to major in zoology. He then moved to Washington State University for his master's degree, encouraged by a professor who suggested that he could have a career in ornithology. His master's study was on the impact of the construction of O'Sullivan Dam to wetland habitats. Apart from the data collected and his interpretation, it included his pen sketches. This was published in The Condor and the article attracted the attention of Charles Sibley who invited him to consider a Ph.D. at Cornell University with him, with his work focusing on the phylogeny of six ducks.

== Career ==
After completing his graduate degree, Johnsgard moved to England at the Wildfowl Trust at Gloucestershire founded by Sir Peter Scott. Over the course of two years, he produced his first book, the Handbook of Waterfowl Behaviour, which was published by Cornell University in 1965. He is considered one of the most prolific authors of ornithology books.

== Selected publications ==
- Grouse and Quails of North America. 1973.
- The Plovers, Sandpipers and Snipes of the World.
- The Grouse of the World. 1983.
- The Hummingbirds of North America. 1983, 2nd ed. 1997, ebook for 2nd ed. 2016.
- The Platte: Channels in Time. 1984, 2nd ed.
- The Pheasants of the World. 1986. 2nd. ed. 1999.
- Diving Birds of North America. 1987.
- The Quails, Partridges and Francolins of the World. 1988.
- North American Owls: Biology and Natural History. 1988. 2nd. ed. 2002.
- Hawks, Eagles and Falcons of North America: Biology and Natural History. 1990.
- Bustards, Hemipodes and Sandgrouse: Birds of Dry Places. 1991.
- Cormorants, Darters and Pelicans of the World. 1993.
- Arena Birds: Sexual Selection and Behavior. 1994
- This Fragile Land: A Natural History of the Nebraska Sandhills. 1995.
- Ruddy Ducks and other Stifftails: Their Behavior and Biology. 1996 (With M. Carbonell)
- The Avian Brood Parasites: Deception at the Nest. 1997.
- Trogons and Quetzals of the World. 2000.
- Prairie Birds: Fragile Splendor in the Great Plains. 2001.
- The Nature of Nebraska: Ecology and Biodiversity. 2001.
- Grassland Grouse and their Conservation. 2002. ebook 2014
- Great Wildlife of the Great Plains. 2003.
- Lewis and Clark on the Great Plains: A Natural History. 2003.
- Prairie Dog Empire: A Saga of the Shortgrass Prairie. 2004. 2005 pbk edition
- The Niobrara: A River Running Through Time. 2007.
- Ancient Voices over America's Wetlands: The Sandhill and Whooping Cranes. 2011.
- Rocky Mountain Birds: Birds and Birding in the Central and Northern Rocky Mountains. 2011.
- Wetland Birds of the Central Plains: South Dakota, Nebraska and Kansas. 2012.
- Nebraska's Wetlands: Their Wildlife and Ecology. 2012.
- Yellowstone Wildlife: Ecology and Natural History of the Greater Yellowstone Ecosystem. 2012. ebook 2013
- A Prairie’s Not Scary. 2012. (Children's book on prairie ecology)
- Birds of the Central Platte Valley, Nebraska. 2013. 182 pp. (With Mary B. Brown.)
- The Birds of Nebraska. Revised edition 2013.
- Birds and Birding in the Bighorn Mountains Region of Wyoming. 2013, With Jacqueline R. Canterbury & Helen Downing.
- Musica de las Grullas: Una Historia Natural de las Grullas de América. 2014. Spanish translation by E. Weir & Karine Gil-Weir of Crane Music (1991, rev. 2013.)
- Game Birds of the World: A Catalog of the Madson Collection. 2014.
- Seasons of the Tallgrass Prairie: A Nebraska Year. 2014.
- Global Warming and Population Responses among Great Plains Birds. 2015.
- Natural Treasures of the Great Plains: An Ecological Perspective. 2015. Edited with T. Lynch & J. Phillips (6 drawings and 4 contributed essays).
- At Home and at Large on the Great Plains: Essays and Memories. 2015.
- A Chorus of Cranes. The Cranes of North America and the World. 2015.
- Birding Nebraska’s Central Platte Valley and Rainwater Basin. 2015.
- Swans: Their Biology and Natural History. 2016.
- The North American Grouse: Biology and Behavior. 2016.
- The North American Geese: Their Biology and Behavior. 2016.
- The North American Sea Ducks. 2016.
- The North American Perching and Dabbling Ducks. 2017.
- The North American Whistling-Ducks, Pochards and Stiff-tailed Ducks. 2017.
- Common Birds of The Brinton Museum and The Bighorn Mountains Foothills. (with J. L. Canterbury). 2017.
- The North American Quails, Partridges and Pheasants. 2017.
- A Naturalist’s Guide to the Great Plains. 2018
- Wyoming’s Ucross Ranch: Its Birds, History, and Natural Environment. 2018. (With Jacqueline L. Canterbury)
- The Ecology of a Tallgrass Treasure: Audubon’s Spring Creek Prairie. 2018.
- Wyoming Wildlife: A Natural History. 2019.
- The North American Swans Their Biology and Conservation. 2020.
- The Abyssinian Art of Louis Agassiz Fuertes in the Field Museum, 2020.
- Audubon's Lillian Annette Rowe Sanctuary: A Refuge, a River, and a Migration. 2020.
- Wildlife of Nebraska: A Natural History. 2020.
- Cranes in Life, Lore and Literature: A Catechism for Crane-lovers, 2020.
- Birds of the Nebraska Sandhills. 2020. With Josef Kren.

== Sources ==
- Farrar, J. 1993. Paul Johnsgard, Nebraska's Birdman. Nebraskaland 71(2): 38–47.
- Johnsgard, Paul. 2010. My life in biology. Nebraska Bird Review 78(3):103-120.
- Klucas, G. 2002. A beautiful mind. Nebraska Magazine. Summer, 2002. pp. 24–27.
- Miles, L. 1993. Paul Johnsgard and the Harmony of Nature. pp. 91–93, in A. Jenkins (ed.), The Platte River: An Atlas of the Big Bend Region. Univ. Nebr. Kearney. 194 pp.
- Scully, M. G. 2001. Heeding the call of sandhill cranes. Chronicle of Higher Educ. 47(30:): B-17.
