= Wahpeton Hospital =

- U.S. National Register of Historic Places
- Location within North Dakota Location within the United States
- Location: 720-722 Dakota Ave., Wahpeton, North Dakota
- Coordinates: 46°15′51″N 96°36′38″W
- Area: less than one acre
- Built: 1911
- Built by: Christenson, Samuel
- Architectural style: Classical Revival
- NRHP reference No.: 83001940
- Added to NRHP: September 29, 1983

The Wahpeton Hospital on Dakota Avenue in Wahpeton, North Dakota was built in 1911. It has Classical Revival architecture.

It was listed on the National Register of Historic Places (NRHP) in 1983.

According to its NRHP nomination it is, architecturally, "the finest private building in Wahpeton, surpassed in quality and size only by such public buildings as the Leach Public Library, Richland County Court House, and Wahpeton city hall."
