= Danton Township, Richland County, North Dakota =

Coordinates: 46°13′56″N 97°03′46″W

Danton Township is a township in Richland County, North Dakota, United States. It is home to half the town of Wyndmere, with parts of the town situated in Wyndmere Township. It is also home to the former town of Moselle.

In 1883, a 72-square-mile (190 km^{2}) called Garfield consisted of two townships, Danton and Barney. On April 28, 1893, Danton Township was organized and officially named Danton, although the homesteaders called it Danton perhaps ten years before. School houses were built in the late 1880s.
