= Richland County, North Dakota =

County in North Dakota, United States

- County
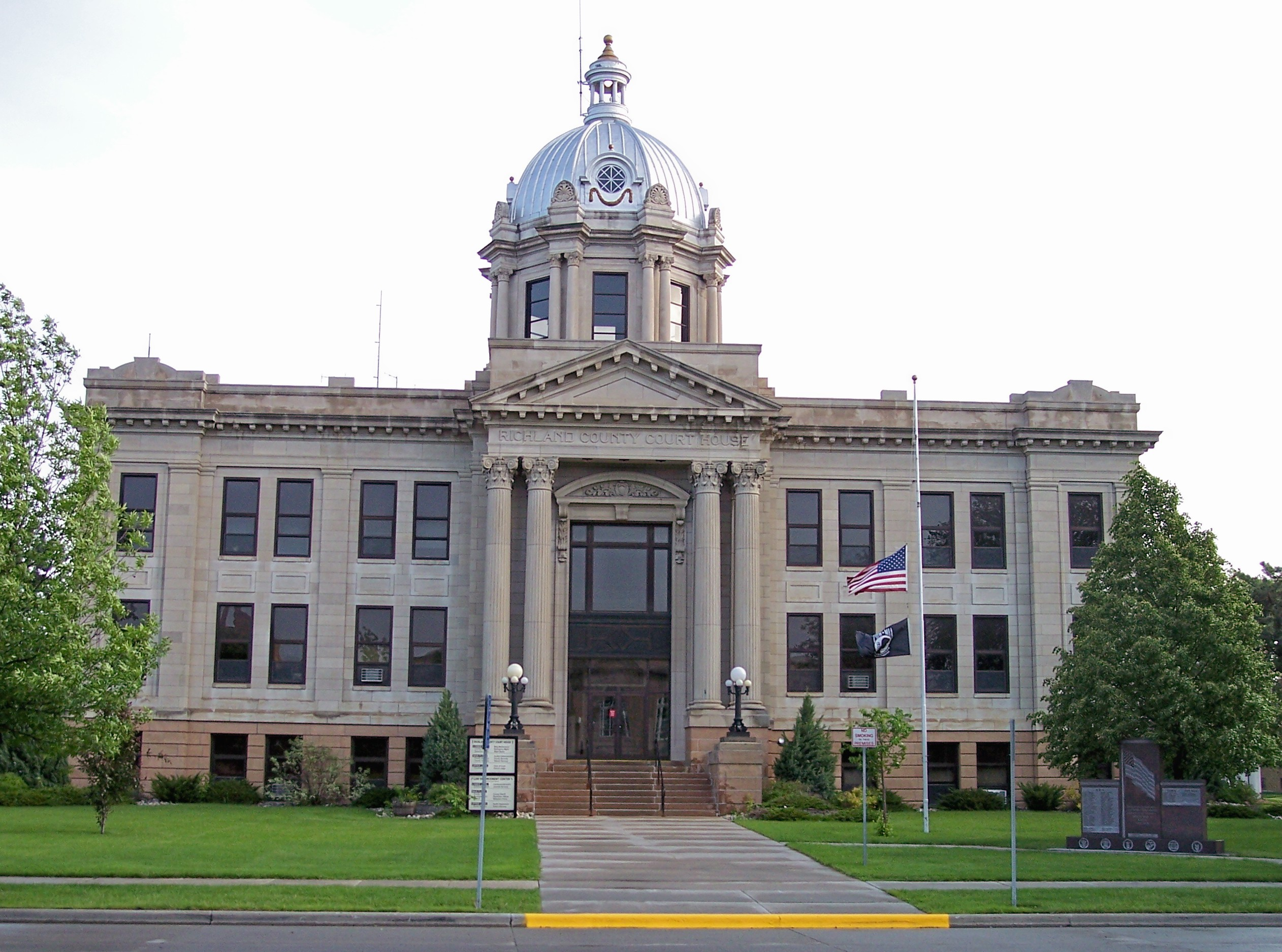
- The Richland County Courthouse in Wahpeton

- Logo

- Location within the U.S. state of North Dakota
- Coordinates: 46.265219°N 96.93796°W
- Country: United States
- State: North Dakota
- Founded: January 4, 1873 (created); November 25, 1873 (organized)
- Named for: Morgan T. Rich
- Seat: Wahpeton
- Largest city: Wahpeton

Area
  - Total: 1,445.340 sq mi (3,743.41 km^{2})
  - Land: 1,435.674 sq mi (3,718.38 km^{2})
  - Water: 9.666 sq mi (25.03 km^{2}) 0.67%

Population (2020)
  - Total: 16,529
  - Estimate (2025): 16,731 ▲
  - Density: 11.603/sq mi (4.480/km^{2})
- Time zone: UTC−6 (Central)
  - Summer (DST): UTC−5 (CDT)
- Area code: 701
- Congressional district: At-large
- Website: co.richland.nd.us

Richland County is a county in the far southeast corner of the U.S. state of North Dakota. As of the 2020 census, the population was 16,529, and was estimated to be 16,731 in 2025. The county seat and the largest city is Wahpeton.

Richland County is part of the Wahpeton, ND–MN Micropolitan Statistical Area, which is also included in the Fargo-Wahpeton, ND-MN Combined Statistical Area.

== History ==
The Dakota Territory legislature created the county on January 4, 1873, with area partitioned from Pembina County. It was named for Morgan T. Rich, who settled on the site of the future Wahpeton in 1869. The county organization was completed on November 25 of that same year. Its boundaries were altered in 1883 and 1885. It has maintained its present configuration since 1885.

In 2022, strong winds known as a derecho, more than 70 mph, produced 34 tornadoes, including one that passed through Richland County near LeMars.

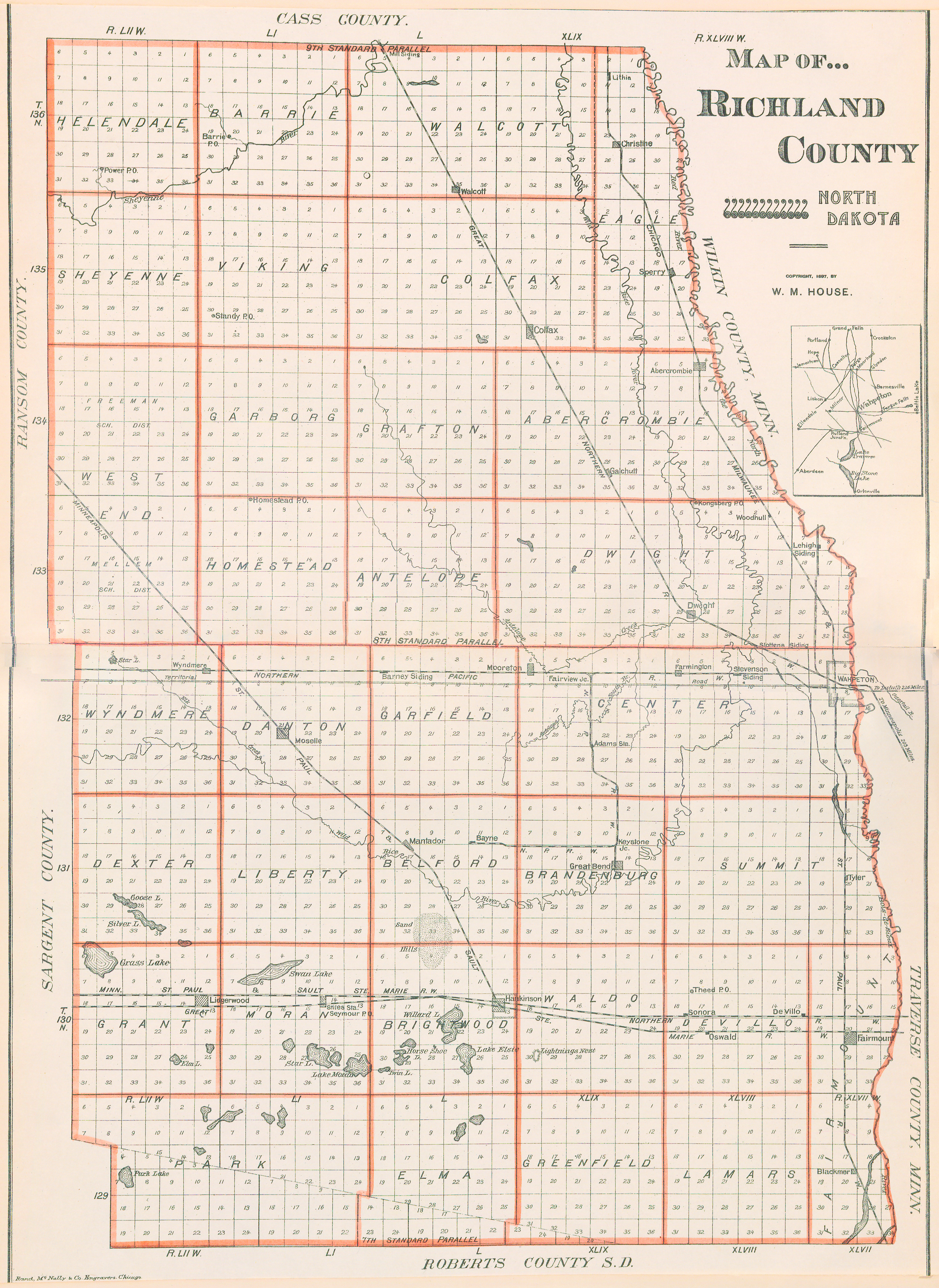
Outline map of Richland County, North Dakota, 1897

== Geography ==
Richland County lies at the southeastern corner of North Dakota. Its eastern boundary line abuts the western boundary line of the state of Minnesota (across the Red River), and its southern boundary line abuts the northern boundary line of the state of South Dakota. The Red River flows northerly along its eastern boundary line on its way to the Hudson Bay. The Wild Rice River flows easterly and then northerly through the county, discharging into the Red River north of Richland County, in Cass County. The Sheyenne River flows northeasterly through the NW corner of the county, also discharging into the Red in Cass County.

The Richland County terrain is primarily flat, with rolling hills in the southwest and northwest. It is largely devoted to agriculture. The terrain slopes to the north and east, with its highest point near its SW corner, at 1,220 ft (370 m) ASL.

According to the United States Census Bureau, the county has a total area of 1,445.340 square miles (3,743.41 km^{2}), of which 1,435.674 square miles (3,718.38 km^{2}) is land and 9.666 square miles (25.03 km^{2}) (0.67%) is water. It is the 18th largest county in North Dakota by total area.

=== Major highways ===
- Interstate 29
- US 81
- North Dakota Highway 11
- North Dakota Highway 13
- North Dakota Highway 18
- North Dakota Highway 27
- North Dakota Highway 46
- North Dakota Highway 127
- North Dakota Highway 210

=== Adjacent counties ===
- Cass County - north
- Clay County, Minnesota - northeast
- Wilkin County, Minnesota - east
- Traverse County, Minnesota - southeast
- Roberts County, South Dakota - south
- Marshall County, South Dakota - southwest
- Sargent County - west
- Ransom County - northwest

=== National protected area ===
- Sheyenne National Grassland (part)

=== Lakes ===
- Bisek Lake
- Grass Lake
- Gullys Slough
- Kreiser Lake
- Lueck Lake
- Moran Lake
- Park Lake
- Silver Lake
- Stacks Slough
- Swan Lake
- Willows Pond
- Lake Elsie

== Demographics ==
Historical population
Census	Pop.	Note	%±
1880	3,597		—
1890	10,751		198.9%
1900	17,387		61.7%
1910	19,659		13.1%
1920	20,887		6.2%
1930	21,008		0.6%
1940	20,519		−2.3%
1950	19,865		−3.2%
1960	18,824		−5.2%
1970	18,089		−3.9%
1980	19,207		6.2%
1990	18,148		−5.5%
2000	17,998		−0.8%
2010	16,321		−9.3%
2020	16,529		1.3%
2025 (est.)	16,731	▲	1.2%
U.S. Decennial Census; 1790–1960 1900–1990; 1990–2000 2010–2020

=== Property values ===
As of the fourth quarter of 2024, the median home value in Richland County was $188,177.

=== American Community Survey ===
As of the 2023 American Community Survey, there are 6,764 estimated households in Richland County with an average of 2.24 persons per household. The county has a median household income of $72,524. Approximately 10.9% of the county's population lives at or below the poverty line. Richland County has an estimated 65.3% employment rate, with 25.0% of the population holding a bachelor's degree or higher and 94.9% holding a high school diploma.

=== Ancestry ===
The top five reported ancestries (people were allowed to report up to two ancestries, thus the figures will generally add to more than 100%) were English (97.7%), Spanish (1.0%), Indo-European (0.9%), Asian and Pacific Islander (0.2%), and Other (0.2%).

The median age in the county was 38.0 years.

Richland County, North Dakota – racial and ethnic composition
Note: the US Census treats Hispanic/Latino as an ethnic category. This table excludes Latinos from the racial categories and assigns them to a separate category. Hispanics/Latinos may be of any race.

Race / ethnicity (NH = non-Hispanic)	Pop. 1980	Pop. 1990	Pop. 2000	Pop. 2010	Pop. 2020
White alone (NH)	18,832 (98.05%)	17,595 (96.95%)	17,337 (96.33%)	15,351 (94.06%)	14,703 (88.95%)
Black or African American alone (NH)	9 (0.05%)	21 (0.12%)	62 (0.34%)	110 (0.67%)	155 (0.94%)
Native American or Alaska Native alone (NH)	249 (1.30%)	400 (2.20%)	297 (1.65%)	302 (1.85%)	433 (2.62%)
Asian alone (NH)	21 (0.11%)	82 (0.45%)	44 (0.24%)	88 (0.54%)	123 (0.74%)
Pacific Islander alone (NH)	—	—	6 (0.03%)	7 (0.04%)	19 (0.11%)
Other race alone (NH)	28 (0.15%)	4 (0.02%)	3 (0.02%)	10 (0.06%)	23 (0.14%)
Mixed race or multiracial (NH)	—	—	126 (0.70%)	182 (1.12%)	499 (3.02%)
Hispanic or Latino (any race)	68 (0.35%)	46 (0.25%)	123 (0.68%)	271 (1.66%)	574 (3.47%)
Total	19,207 (100.00%)	18,148 (100.00%)	17,998 (100.00%)	16,321 (100.00%)	16,529 (100.00%)

=== 2024 estimate ===
As of the 2024 estimate, there were 16,658 people and 6,764 households residing in the county. There were 7,620 housing units at an average density of 5.31 per square mile (2.1/km^{2}). The racial makeup of the county was 92.8% White (90.0% NH White), 1.3% African American, 3.1% Native American, 0.6% Asian, 0.1% Pacific Islander, _% from some other races and 2.1% from two or more races. Hispanic or Latino people of any race were 3.7% of the population.

=== 2020 census ===
As of the 2020 census, the county had a population of 16,529. Of the residents, 22.4% were under the age of 18 and 18.7% were 65 years of age or older; the median age was 39.2 years. For every 100 females there were 106.4 males, and for every 100 females age 18 and over there were 106.2 males.

There were 6,710 households and 4,174 families residing in the county.

The population density was 11.5 inhabitants per square mile (4.4/km^{2}). There were 7,501 housing units at an average density of 5.22 per square mile (2.0/km^{2}), of which 10.5% were vacant; among occupied housing units, 71.7% were owner-occupied and 28.3% were renter-occupied, with a 1.4% homeowner vacancy rate and a 13.4% rental vacancy rate.

The racial makeup of the county was 90.0% White, 0.9% Black or African American, 2.8% American Indian and Alaska Native, 0.8% Asian, 1.5% from some other race, and 3.9% from two or more races.

Hispanic or Latino residents of any race comprised 3.5% of the population.

Of those households, 26.9% had children under the age of 18 living with them and 21.1% had a female householder with no spouse or partner present. About 31.8% of all households were made up of individuals and 12.7% had someone living alone who was 65 years of age or older.

=== 2010 census ===
As of the 2010 census, there were 16,321 people, 6,651 households, and 4,171 families residing in the county. The population density was 11.4 inhabitants per square mile (4.4/km^{2}). There were 7,503 housing units at an average density of 5.23 per square mile (2.0/km^{2}). The racial makeup of the county was 95.01% White, 0.67% African American, 2.02% Native American, 0.54% Asian, 0.06% Pacific Islander, 0.41% from some other races and 1.29% from two or more races. Hispanic or Latino people of any race were 1.66% of the population.

In terms of ancestry, 53.0% were German, 31.2% were Norwegian, 7.0% were Irish, and 2.3% were American.

There were 6,651 households, 28.3% had children under the age of 18 living with them, 51.6% were married couples living together, 7.1% had a female householder with no husband present, 37.3% were non-families, and 30.9% of all households were made up of individuals. The average household size was 2.31 and the average family size was 2.91. The median age was 39.4 years.

The median income for a household in the county was $47,131 and the median income for a family was $64,636. Males had a median income of $42,597 versus $28,284 for females. The per capita income for the county was $24,342. About 5.2% of families and 10.7% of the population were below the poverty line, including 8.8% of those under age 18 and 11.6% of those age 65 or over.

== Communities ==
=== Cities ===
- Abercrombie
- Barney
- Christine
- Colfax
- Dwight
- Fairmount
- Great Bend
- Hankinson
- Lidgerwood
- Mantador
- Mooreton
- Wahpeton (county seat)
- Walcott
- Wyndmere

=== Unincorporated communities ===
- Blackmer
- Enloe
- Galchutt
- La Mars
- Lithia
- Tyler

=== Townships ===
- Abercrombie
- Antelope
- Barney
- Barrie
- Belford
- Brandenburg
- Brightwood
- Center
- Colfax
- Danton
- Devillo
- Dexter
- Duerr
- Dwight
- Eagle
- Elma
- Fairmount
- Freeman
- Garborg
- Grant
- Greendale
- Helendale
- Homestead
- Ibsen
- LaMars
- Liberty Grove
- Lidgerwood
- Mooreton
- Moran
- Nansen
- Sheyenne
- Summit
- Viking
- Walcott
- Waldo
- West End
- Wyndmere

== Politics ==
Richland County voters have traditionally voted Republican. In only one national election since 1936 has the county selected the Democratic Party candidate (as of 2024).

United States presidential election results for Richland County, North Dakota
Year	Republican		Democratic		Third party(ies)	
Year	No.	%	No.	%	No.	%
1900	2,067	58.46%	1,399	39.56%	70	1.98%
1904	2,420	66.50%	1,116	30.67%	103	2.83%
1908	1,864	54.17%	1,502	43.65%	75	2.18%
1912	1,034	31.95%	1,380	42.65%	822	25.40%
1916	2,097	53.25%	1,772	45.00%	69	1.75%
1920	5,483	79.46%	1,339	19.41%	78	1.13%
1924	3,235	48.84%	769	11.61%	2,620	39.55%
1928	4,251	53.89%	3,604	45.68%	34	0.43%
1932	2,304	28.16%	5,663	69.20%	216	2.64%
1936	2,386	31.41%	3,792	49.92%	1,418	18.67%
1940	5,102	58.42%	3,584	41.04%	48	0.55%
1944	4,402	57.74%	3,192	41.87%	30	0.39%
1948	3,448	48.73%	3,413	48.24%	214	3.02%
1952	6,022	69.78%	2,541	29.44%	67	0.78%
1956	4,971	60.96%	3,171	38.89%	12	0.15%
1960	4,711	54.04%	4,003	45.92%	4	0.05%
1964	3,425	43.05%	4,525	56.88%	5	0.06%
1968	4,224	54.38%	3,098	39.89%	445	5.73%
1972	5,194	60.23%	3,367	39.04%	63	0.73%
1976	4,991	51.01%	4,592	46.93%	202	2.06%
1980	5,711	61.17%	2,698	28.90%	928	9.94%
1984	5,980	65.48%	3,047	33.36%	106	1.16%
1988	4,670	56.44%	3,523	42.58%	81	0.98%
1992	3,873	46.66%	2,688	32.38%	1,740	20.96%
1996	3,345	47.32%	2,890	40.88%	834	11.80%
2000	4,999	62.37%	2,490	31.07%	526	6.56%
2004	5,264	64.08%	2,821	34.34%	130	1.58%
2008	3,900	51.57%	3,513	46.45%	150	1.98%
2012	4,229	55.55%	3,198	42.01%	186	2.44%
2016	4,767	62.79%	2,064	27.19%	761	10.02%
2020	5,072	64.93%	2,510	32.13%	230	2.94%
2024	5,576	67.50%	2,473	29.94%	212	2.57%

== Education ==
School districts include:

- Fairmount Public School District 18
- Hankinson Public School District 8
- Kindred Public School District 2
- Lidgerwood Public School District 28
- Richland Public School District 44
- Wahpeton Public School District 37
- Wyndmere Public School District 42

Circle of Nations Wahpeton Indian School is a tribally controlled school affiliated with the Bureau of Indian Education (BIE).

== See also ==
- National Register of Historic Places listings in Richland County, North Dakota
