= Oakes Post Office =

- U.S. Post Office-Oakes
- U.S. National Register of Historic Places
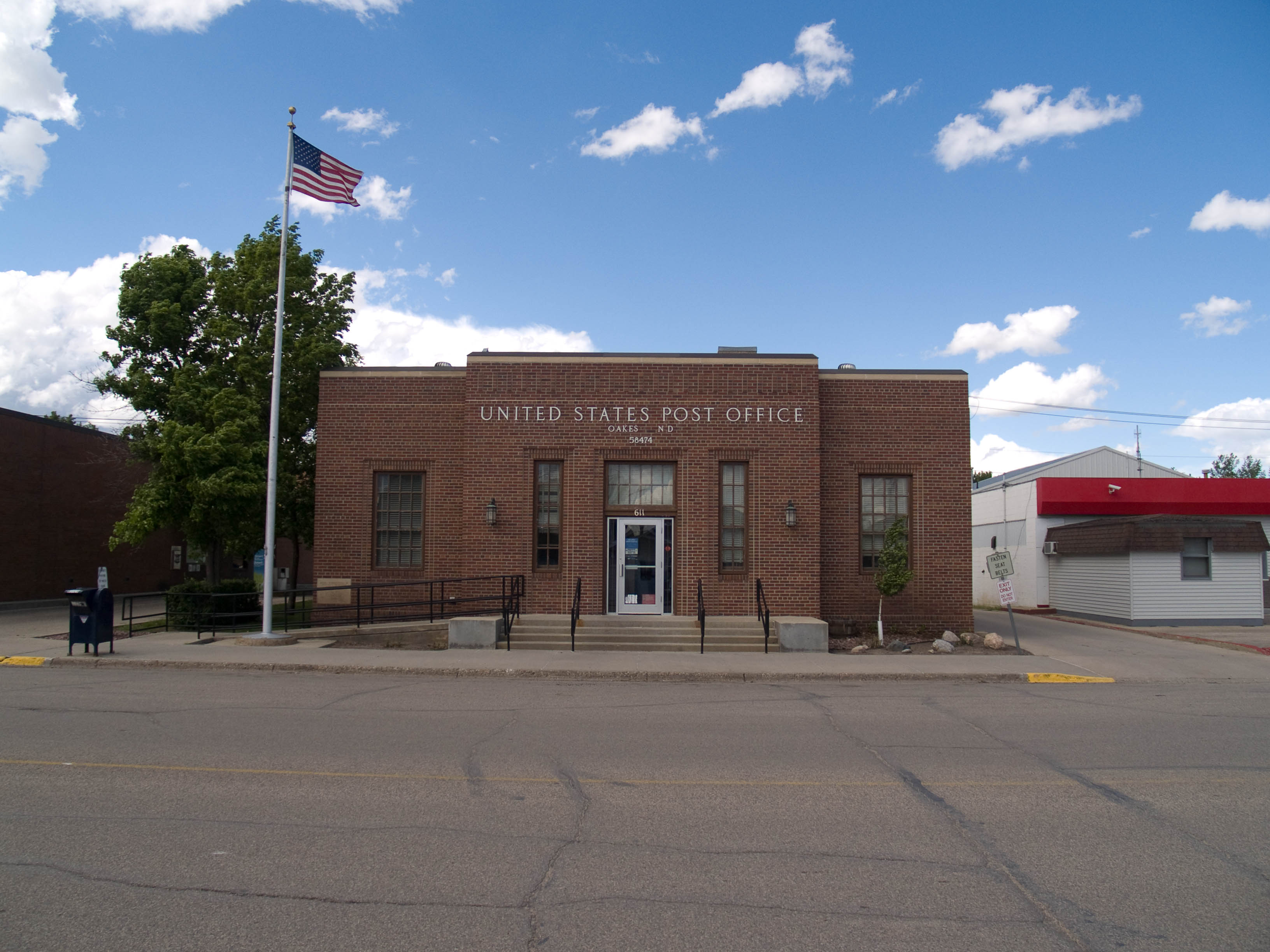

- Location within North Dakota Location within the United States
- Interactive map showing the location of U.S. Post Office–Oakes
- Location: 611 Main Ave., Oakes, North Dakota
- Coordinates: 46.13909°N 98.09131°W
- Area: less than one acre
- Built: 1935
- Built by: McGough Brothers
- Architect: Louis A. Simon
- Architectural style: Starved Classicism
- MPS: US Post Offices in North Dakota, 1900-1940 MPS
- NRHP reference No.: 89001753
- Added to NRHP: November 1, 1989

The Oakes Post Office in Oakes, North Dakota, United States, is a post office building that was built in 1935. It was listed on the National Register of Historic Places in 1989 as U.S. Post Office-Oakes.

The design is credited to Louis A. Simon; building was done by the McGough Brothers.
