= United States Post Office-Langdon =

- U.S. Post Office-Langdon
- U.S. National Register of Historic Places
- Location within North Dakota Location within the United States
- Location: 323 Eighth Ave., Langdon, North Dakota
- Coordinates: 48°45′41″N 98°22′8″W
- Area: less than one acre
- Built: 1937
- Architect: James A. Wetmore
- Architectural style: Starved Classicism
- MPS: US Post Offices in North Dakota, 1900–1940 MPS
- NRHP reference No.: 89001752
- Added to NRHP: November 1, 1989

The U.S. Post Office-Langdon, also known as Langdon Post Office, in Langdon, North Dakota, United States, is a post office building that was built in 1937. It was listed on the National Register of Historic Places in 1989.
