= New Rockford Post Office =

- U.S. Post Office-New Rockford
- U.S. National Register of Historic Places
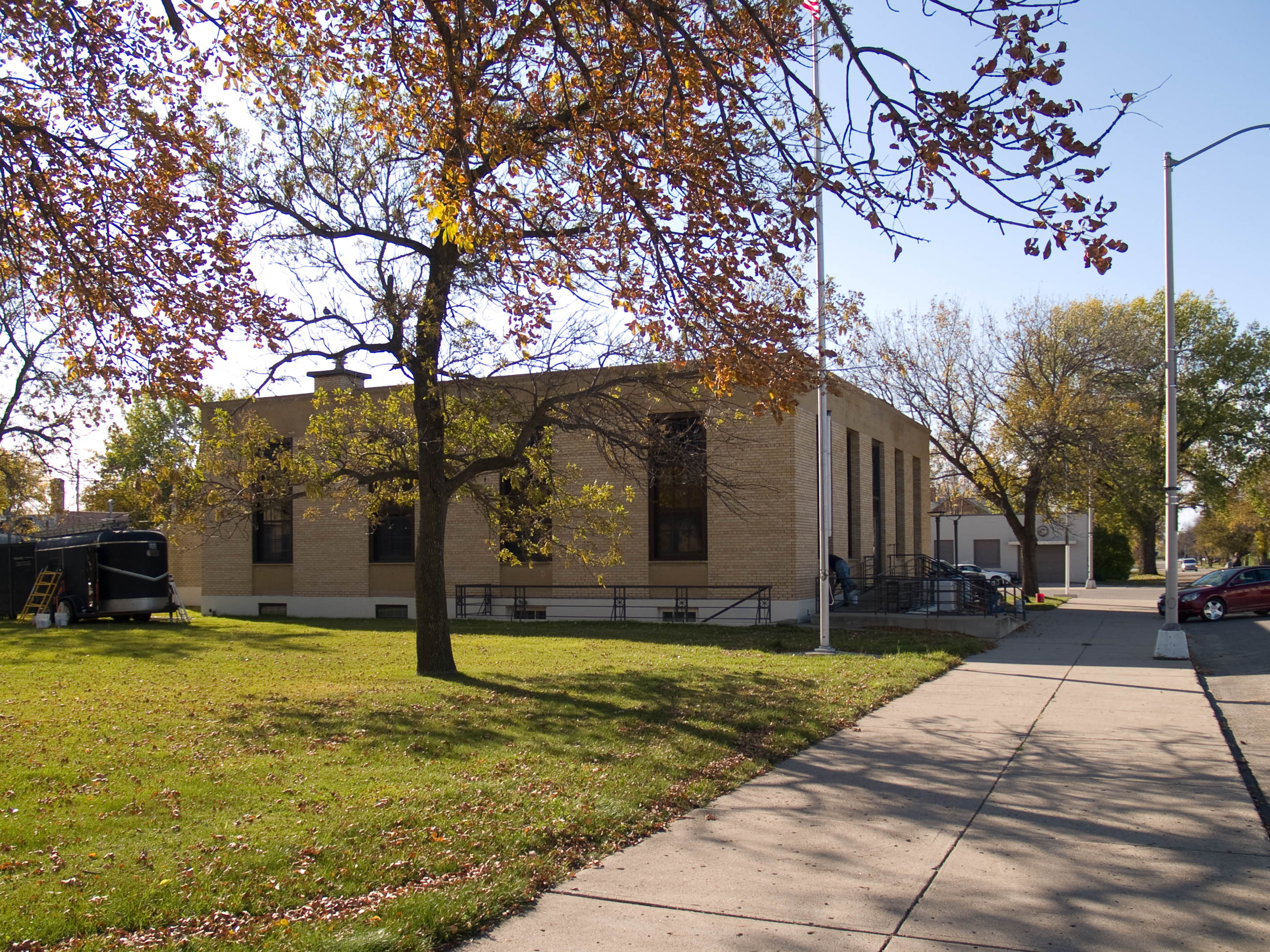

- Location within North Dakota Location within the United States
- Location: 821 N. First Ave., New Rockford, North Dakota
- Coordinates: 47°40′51″N 99°8′21″W
- Area: less than one acre
- Built: 1939
- Architect: Simon, Louis A.
- Architectural style: Starved Classicism
- MPS: US Post Offices in North Dakota, 1900-1940 MPS
- NRHP reference No.: 89001750
- Added to NRHP: November 1, 1989

The New Rockford Post Office in New Rockford, North Dakota, United States, is a post office building that was built in 1939. It was listed on the National Register of Historic Places in 1989 as U.S. Post Office-New Rockford.

It "was funded under the Emergency Construction Program Act of August 5, 1937 with an allocation of $85,000".
