= Colfax, North Dakota =

- City
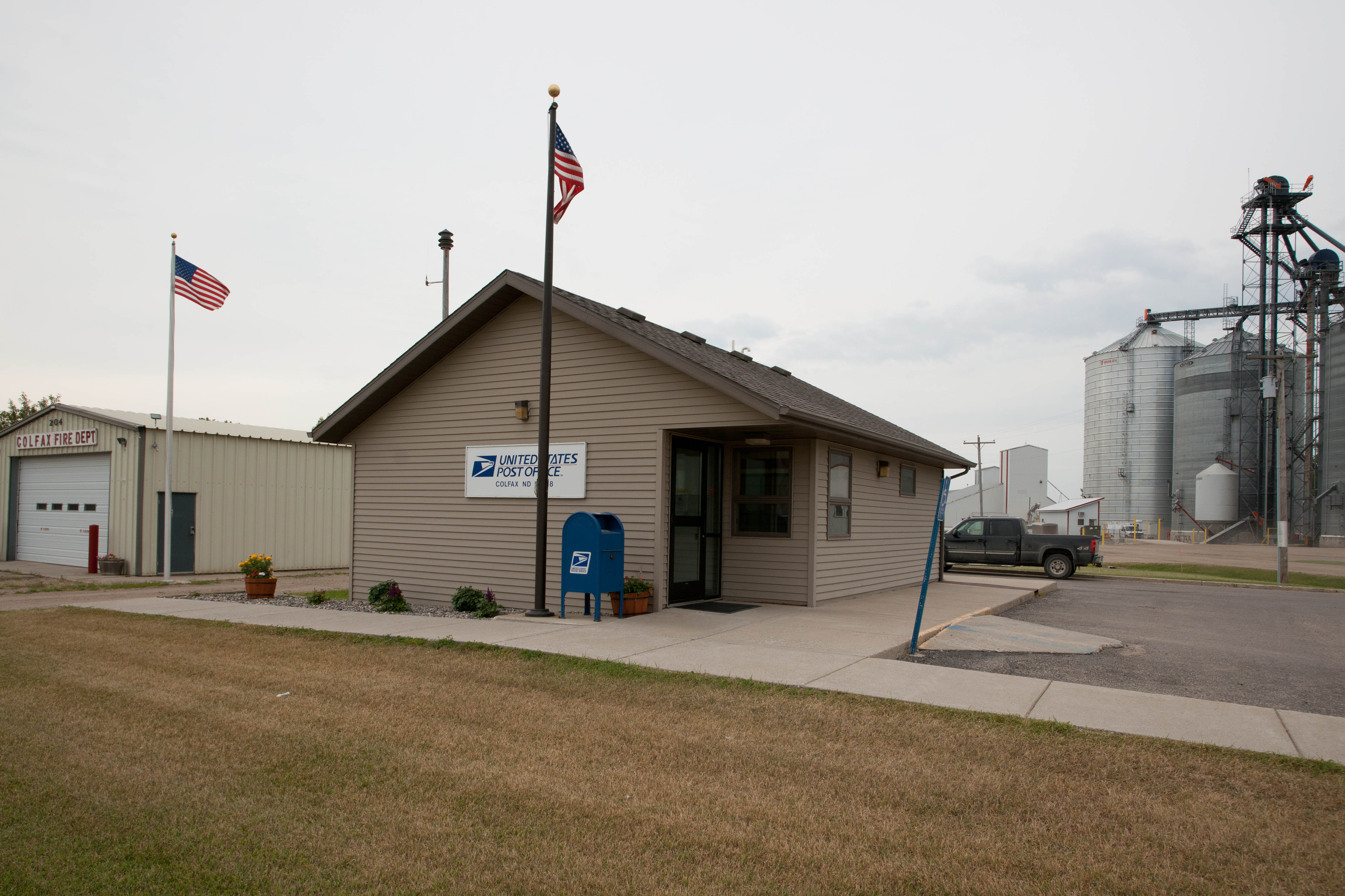
- Post office in Colfax
- Nickname: "The Fountain City"
- Location of Colfax, North Dakota
- Coordinates: 46.4709°N 96.8724°W
- Country: United States
- State: North Dakota
- County: Richland
- Platted: June 17, 1881
- Incorporated: 1954

Government
  - Mayor: Kyle Krump
  - Councilmembers: Tom Steinolfson; Shaun Jacobson; Jesse Moch; Scott Gauslow
  - Auditor: Jen Skoog

Area
  - City: 1.008 sq mi (2.611 km^{2})
  - Land: 1.008 sq mi (2.611 km^{2})
  - Water: 0 sq mi (0.000 km^{2}) 0.00%
- Elevation: 961 ft (293 m)

Population (2020)
  - City: 172
  - Estimate (2025): 217
  - Density: 171/sq mi (65.9/km^{2})
  - Metro: 23,019
- Time zone: UTC–6 (Central (CST))
  - Summer (DST): UTC–5 (CDT)
- ZIP Code: 58018
- Area code: 701
- FIPS code: 38-15180
- GNIS feature ID: 1035975
- Website: colfaxnd.org

Colfax is a city in Richland County, North Dakota, United States. The population was 172 at the 2020 census, and was estimated to be 217 in 2025.

It is part of the Wahpeton, ND–MN Micropolitan Statistical Area. In the mid-1960s it billed itself as the "smallest town in the U.S. with a public swimming pool".

== History ==
Richland County Township History: Colfax

Taken from History of Richland County Book Page 142

Colfax is a small town located twenty-five miles to the north and west of Wahpeton in Richland County. The origin of Colfax dates back to July 2, 1864, when Congress granted lands to the Northern Pacific Railroad Company for the construction of a railroad and a telephone line from Lake Superior to Puget Sound.

Schuyler Colfax, Vice-President of the United States under President U.S. Grant, purchased the west half of Section 29, Township 135, Range 49 and other lands containing 3,120 acres all in Colfax. Garborg and Nansen townships for a consideration of $15,600 (or $5.00 per acre) on August 10, 1878. Mr. Colfax platted the first addition to Colfax on June 17, 1881. Colfax townsite was surveyed by J.S. Stack the same year, the plat being laid out with the railroad as a base and therefore not following the points of the compass. Silas Maxwell, owner of land east of the railroad, sold this tract of land to Horace B. Crandall on January 15, 1881. On March 19, 1881, he filed the plat of the original townsite of Colfax. It was in 1882 that the name of the town was officially designated Colfax. Mr. Schuyler Colfax would periodically travel to the area to check his land holdings.

Hattie A. and Israel M. Hay, husband and wife, platted Tyner's Addition to Colfax, which is also located on part of the W 1/2 of Section 29, Township 135, Range 49 on April 26, 1887. This is north of the original townsite.

Colfax was nicknamed "The Fountain City" because of the many artesian wells in the village and vicinity, one of which was 130 feet deep and had a flow of 300 gallons a minute.

Colfax was incorporated as a village in 1954.

== Geography ==
According to the United States Census Bureau, the city has a total area of 1.008 square miles (2.61 km^{2}), all land.

== Demographics ==
Historical population
Census	Pop.	Note	%±
1960	98		—
1970	70		−28.6%
1980	101		44.3%
1990	80		−20.8%
2000	91		13.8%
2010	121		33.0%
2020	172		42.1%
2025 (est.)	217		26.2%
U.S. Decennial Census; 2020 Census

As of the 2023 American Community Survey, there are 73 estimated households in Colfax with an average of 3.63 persons per household. The city has a median household income of $114,375. Approximately N/A of the city's population lives at or below the poverty line. Colfax has an estimated 56.5% employment rate, with 56.7% of the population holding a bachelor's degree or higher and 99.4% holding a high school diploma.

The top five reported ancestries (people were allowed to report up to two ancestries, thus the figures will generally add to more than 100%) were English (99.2%), Spanish (0.0%), Indo-European (0.8%), Asian and Pacific Islander (0.0%), and Other (0.0%).

The median age in the city was 37.5 years.

=== 2020 census ===
As of the 2020 census, there were 172 people, 58 households, and 49 families residing in the city. The population density was 170.3 inhabitants per square mile (65.8/km^{2}). There were 61 housing units at an average density of 60.4 per square mile (23.3/km^{2}). The racial makeup of the city was 94.77% White, 0.00% African American, 1.16% Native American, 0.00% Asian, 0.58% Pacific Islander, 0.58% from some other races and 2.91% from two or more races. Hispanic or Latino people of any race were 1.16% of the population.

=== 2010 census ===
As of the 2010 census, there were 121 people, 46 households, and 36 families residing in the city. The population density was 118.6 inhabitants per square mile (45.8/km^{2}). There were 48 housing units at an average density of 47.1 per square mile (18.2/km^{2}). The racial makeup of the city was 100.00% White.

There were 46 households, of which 34.8% had children under the age of 18 living with them, 67.4% were married couples living together, 8.7% had a female householder with no husband present, 2.2% had a male householder with no wife present, and 21.7% were non-families. 19.6% of all households were made up of individuals, and 10.9% had someone living alone who was 65 years of age or older. The average household size was 2.63 and the average family size was 2.94.

The median age in the city was 37.4 years. 28.9% of residents were under the age of 18; 4.2% were between the ages of 18 and 24; 33.8% were from 25 to 44; 19.8% were from 45 to 64; and 13.2% were 65 years of age or older. The gender makeup of the city was 55.4% male and 44.6% female.

=== 2000 census ===
As of the 2000 census, there were 91 people, 40 households, and 28 families residing in the city. The population density was 102.5 inhabitants per square mile (39.6/km^{2}). There were 44 housing units at an average density of 49.6 per square mile (19.2/km^{2}). 100.00% White. Hispanic or Latino people of any race were 1.10% of the population.

There were 40 households, out of which 27.5% had children under the age of 18 living with them, 60.0% were married couples living together, 10.0% had a female householder with no husband present, and 30.0% were non-families. 27.5% of all households were made up of individuals, and 22.5% had someone living alone who was 65 years of age or older. The average household size was 2.28 and the average family size was 2.79.

In the city, the population was spread out, with 25.3% under the age of 18, 3.3% from 18 to 24, 29.7% from 25 to 44, 22.0% from 45 to 64, and 19.8% who were 65 years of age or older. The median age was 42 years. For every 100 females, there were 78.4 males. For every 100 females age 18 and over, there were 78.9 males.

The median income for a household in the city was $33,333, and the median income for a family was $55,833. Males had a median income of $28,333 versus $25,417 for females. The per capita income for the city was $19,635. There were no families and 7.0% of the population living below the poverty line, including no under eighteens and 12.5% of those over 64.
