= Rugby Post Office =

- U.S. Post Office-Rugby
- U.S. National Register of Historic Places
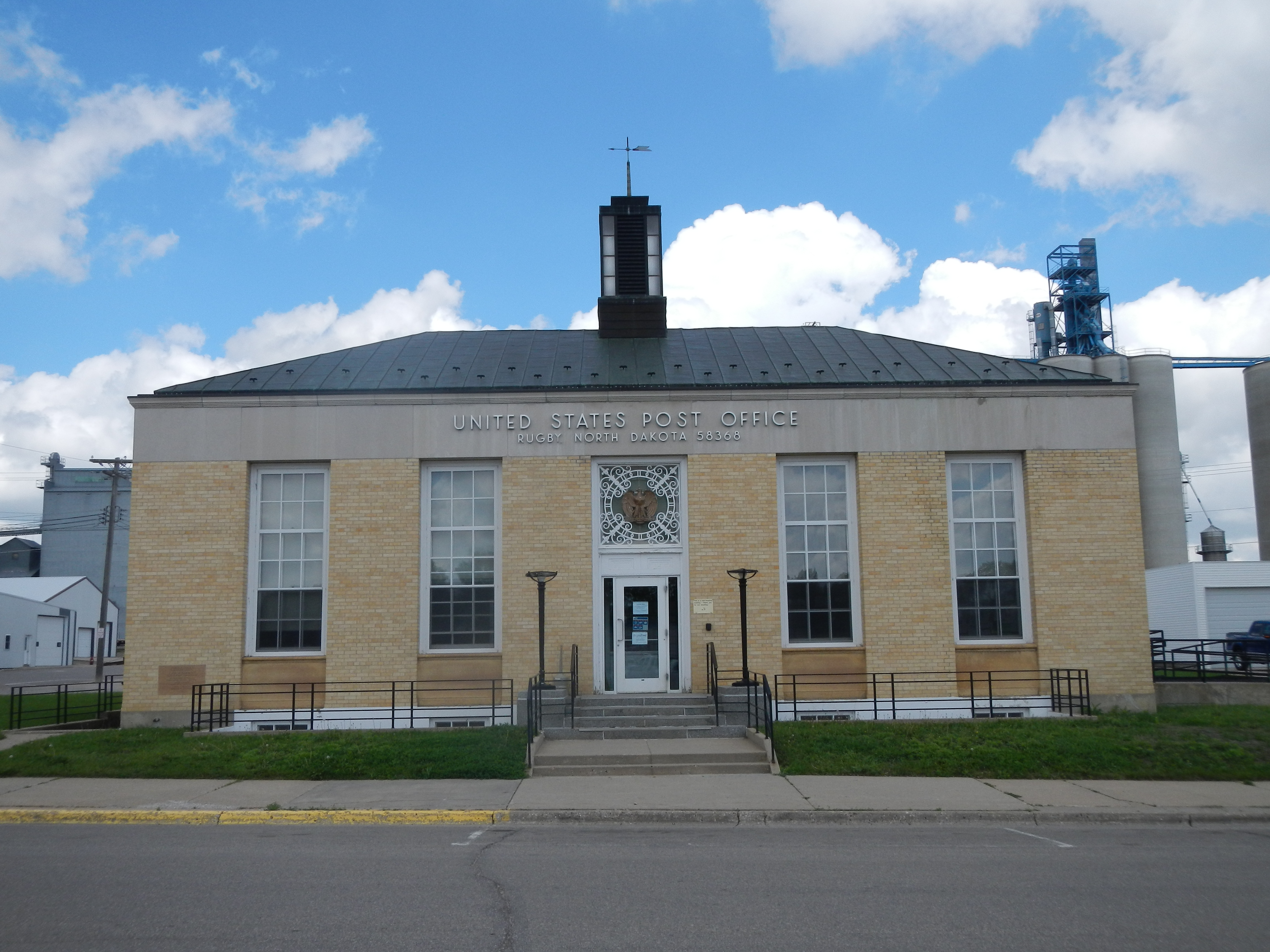

- Location within North Dakota Location within the United States
- Location: 205 SE. Second St., Rugby, North Dakota
- Coordinates: 48°22′12″N 99°59′38″W
- Area: less than one acre
- Built: 1940
- Built by: Minecke-Johnson Co.
- Architect: Simon, Louis A.
- Architectural style: Starved Classicism
- MPS: US Post Offices in North Dakota, 1900--1940 MPS
- NRHP reference No.: 89001748
- Added to NRHP: November 1, 1989

The Rugby Post Office in Rugby, North Dakota, United States, is a post office building that was built in 1940. It was listed on the National Register of Historic Places in 1989 as U.S. Post Office-Rugby.
