= Aslag Benson =

American politician

Aslag Benson (January 16, 1855 – July 19, 1937) was a member of the North Dakota Senate from 1903 to 1906.

Aslag Benson was born in Norway and came to America in 1865. Benson resided in Christine, North Dakota, and was an early settler of that community. From 1889, he opened a general store in Christine in partnership with Austin Johnsgard (1864–1951). After seven years, Johnsgard bought Benson out. He was a Democrat representing North Dakota's 12th legislative district.
