= Nelson's Grocery =

- Formerly listed on the U.S. National Register of Historic Places
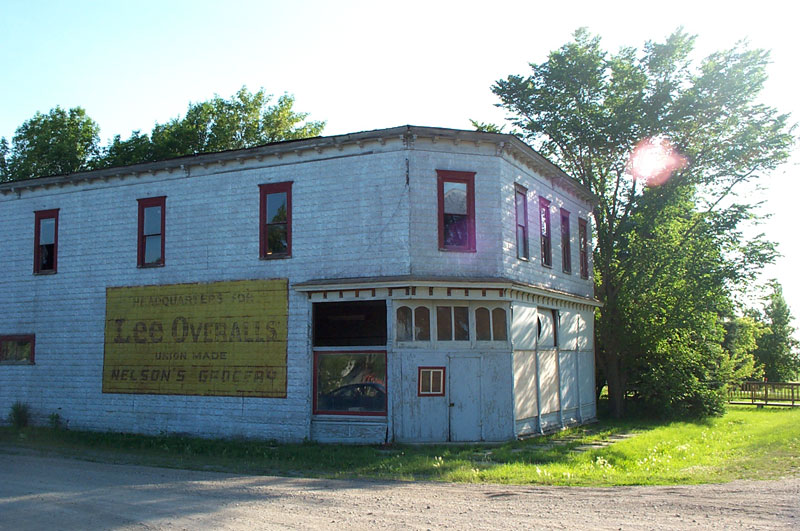

- Location within North Dakota Location within the United States
- Location: Main and 3rd Sts., Christine, North Dakota
- Coordinates: 46°34′28″N 96°48′22″W
- Area: less than one acre
- Built: 1905
- Built by: Fredeen, Peter
- NRHP reference No.: 77001027

Significant dates
- Added to NRHP: October 5, 1977
- Removed from NRHP: June 24, 2025

Nelson's Grocery, in Christine, North Dakota, was listed on the National Register of Historic Places in 1977. It was built in 1905. The listing included three contributing buildings.

According to its NRHP nomination, the store, "an institution in the business life of Christine for over 70 years, belongs to a rapidly disappearing architectural and commercial genre which once promoted the growth of small towns throughout North Dakota."
