= United States Post Office-Hettinger =

- U.S. Post Office-Hettinger
- U.S. National Register of Historic Places
- Location within North Dakota Location within the United States
- Location: Lake St. and Adams Ave., Hettinger, North Dakota
- Coordinates: 46°0′5″N 102°38′10″W
- Area: less than one acre
- Built: 1937–38
- Architect: Louis A. Simon, Henry, Jr. Huether
- Architectural style: Starved Classicism
- MPS: US Post Offices in North Dakota, 1900–1940 MPS
- NRHP reference No.: 89001751
- Added to NRHP: November 1, 1989

The U.S. Post Office-Hettinger in Hettinger, North Dakota, United States, is an example of Starved Classicism architecture. Also known as Hettinger Post Office, it was built during 1937-1938 and was listed on the National Register of Historic Places (NRHP) in 1989.

The main portion of the building is nearly square, 60 by 58.5 feet (18.3 m × 17.8 m). There were just five other "Starved Classicism" style post offices built in North Dakota, based on standard plans from the U.S. Treasury Department. And, it is the only federal building in Hettinger. A post office at Langdon was the only other post office in North Dakota funded under the same funding program.

It is located a block west along Highway 12 from the Adams County Courthouse, built during 1928–29, also NRHP-listed.
