= Carrington Post Office =

- U.S. Post Office-Carrington
- U.S. National Register of Historic Places
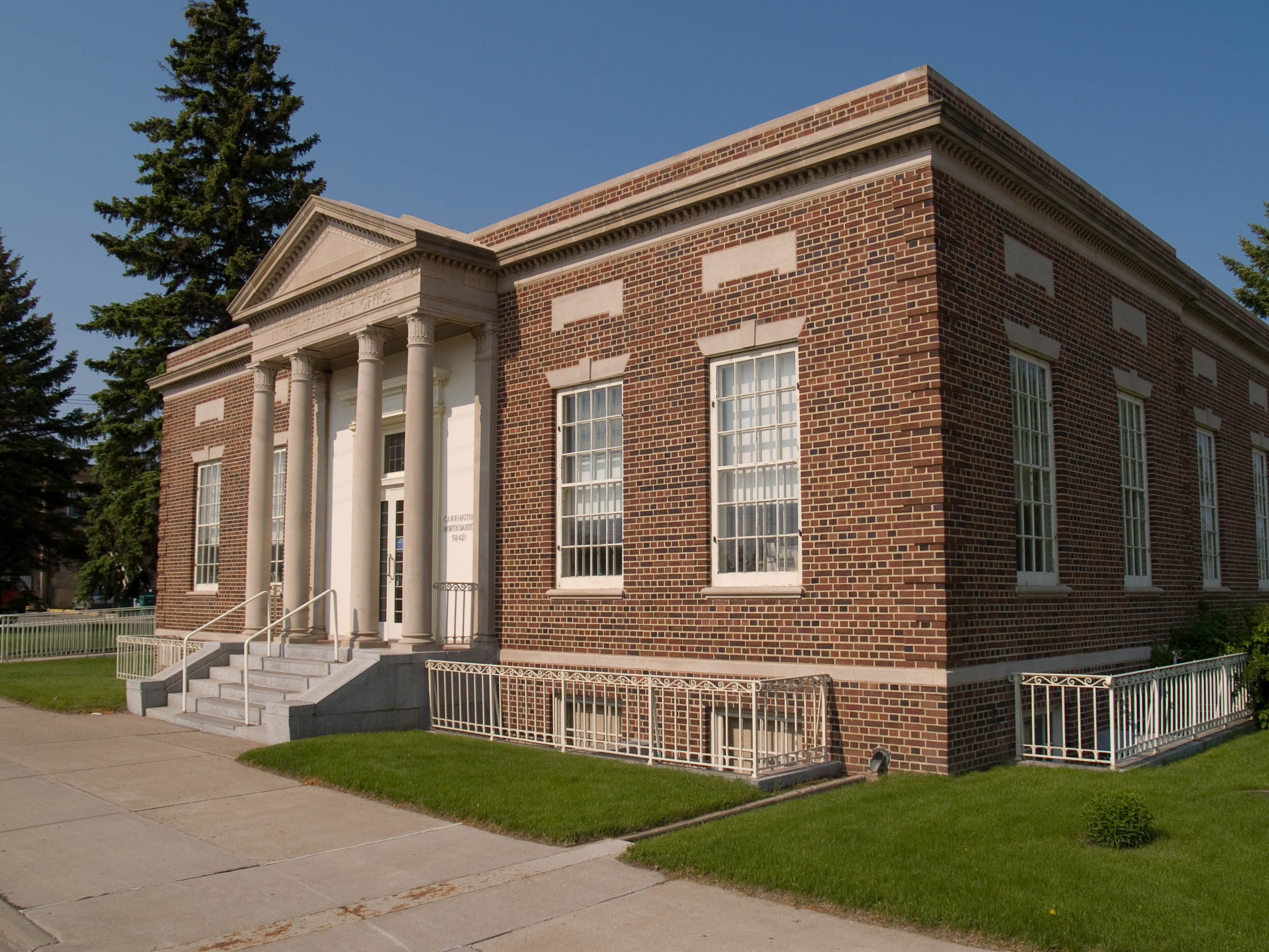

- Location within North Dakota Location within the United States
- Location: 87 N. Ninth Ave., Carrington, North Dakota
- Coordinates: 47°27′1″N 99°7′29″W
- Area: less than one acre
- Built: 1932
- Architect: Wetmore, James A.; Redlinger & Hansen
- Architectural style: Colonial Revival
- MPS: US Post Offices in North Dakota, 1900--1940 MPS
- NRHP reference No.: 89001754
- Added to NRHP: November 1, 1989

The U.S. Post Office-Carrington in Carrington, North Dakota, United States, also known as Carrington Post Office, is a post office building that was built in 1932. It was listed on the National Register of Historic Places in 1989.
