= Federal Building and U.S. Post Office (Fargo, North Dakota) =

- U.S. National Register of Historic Places
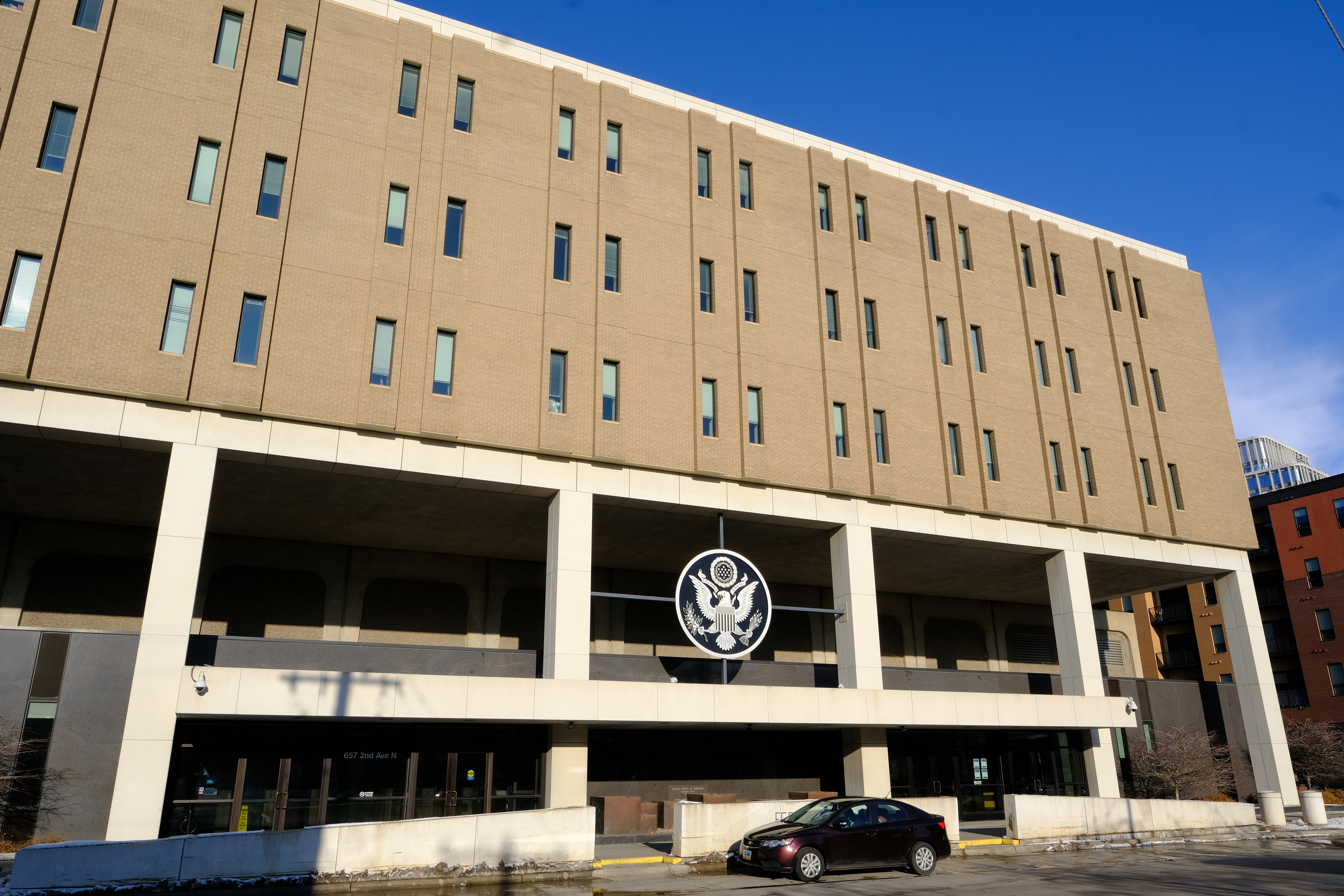

- Location within North Dakota Location within the United States
- Location: 657 2nd Ave., Fargo, North Dakota
- Coordinates: 46°52′42″N 96°47′24″W
- Area: less than one acre
- Built: 1969-70
- Built by: T.F. Powers Construction Co.
- Architectural style: Modern Movement
- NRHP reference No.: 100006635
- Added to NRHP: June 4, 2021

The Federal Building and U.S. Post Office at 657 2nd Ave. in Fargo, North Dakota, was built in 1969–70. It was listed on the National Register of Historic Places in 2021.

NDSU Archives states:

A new Post Office was built in 1970. Shown above, the Post Office is located on the northwest corner of Roberts Street and Second Avenue north. The building was dedicated on Friday, June 26, 1970, at 10am. A 30 minute band concert preceded the event. Among the dignitaries attending the dedication were Governor William L. Guy, Fargo Mayor Herschel Lashkowitz, Senators Milton R. Young and Quentin Burdick, and Representatives Thomas Kleppe and Mark Andrews.

It is one of 24 federal buildings owned by the General Services Administration in North Dakota in 2021.

Note a large number of North Dakota post offices built during 1900-1940 were reviewed in a 1989 study, resulting in immediate NRHP listing of 12 to add to the eight previously listing. Others may have been listed since then in accordance with standards laid out in that study. This 1969 building may be the most recently built post office so far listed in North Dakota. (Note: It may be verified by review of all North Dakota listings.)

It is termed mid-century modern in RoadsideArchitecture.com.

It was built by T.F. Powers Construction Co., which opened in 1893 after downtown Fargo was largely destroyed by fire.

Flooding in Fargo led to this location handling more mail in 2009, when the post office annex at 4007 33rd St., NW, was flooded.
