= Lisbon Post Office =

- U.S. Post Office-Lisbon
- U.S. National Register of Historic Places
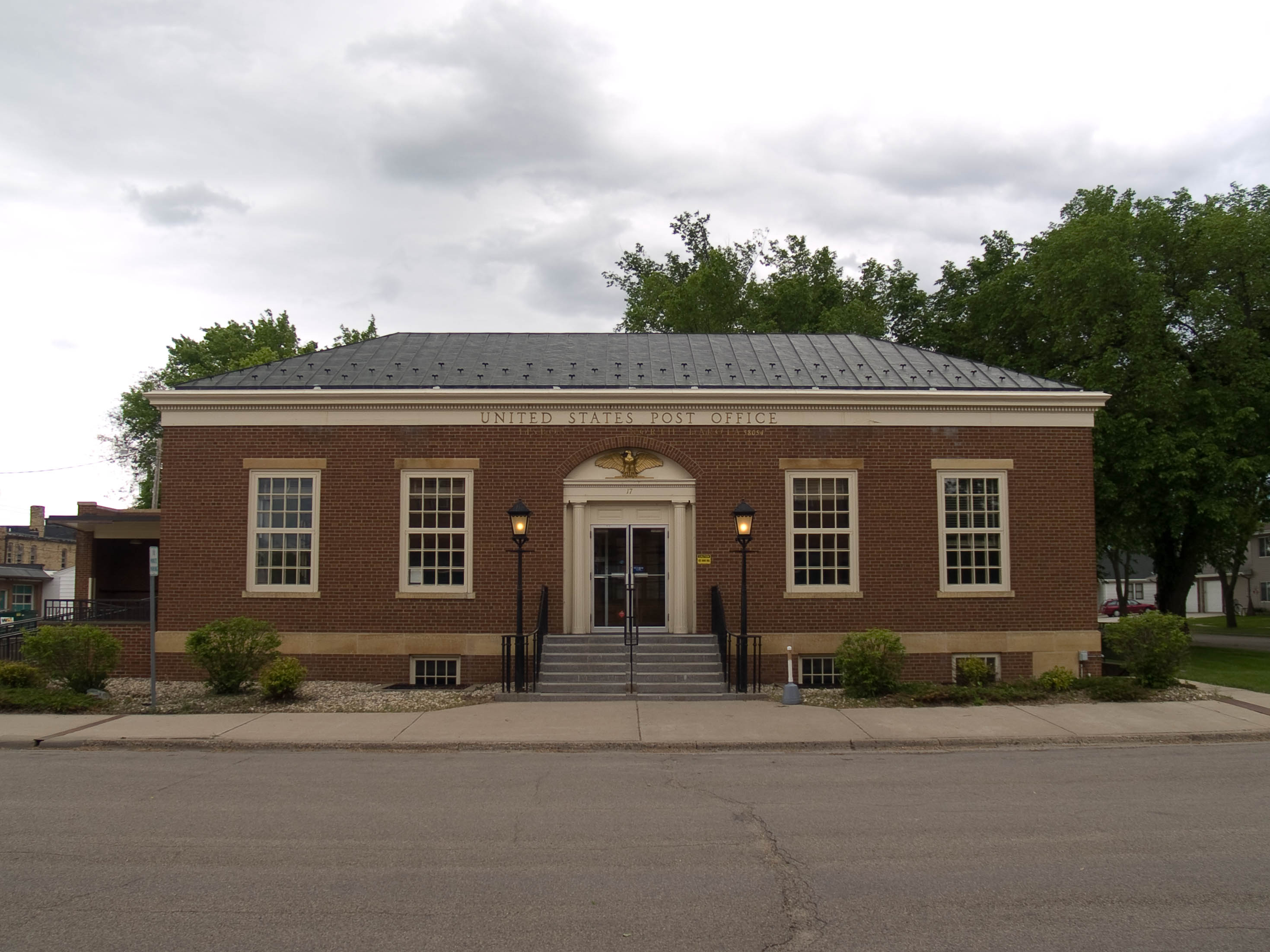

- Location within North Dakota Location within the United States
- Location: 17 W. Fourth Ave., Lisbon, North Dakota
- Coordinates: 46°26′32″N 97°40′55″W
- Area: less than one acre
- Built: 1939
- Architect: Louis A. Simon
- Architectural style: Starved Classicism
- MPS: US Post Offices in North Dakota, 1900-1940 MPS
- NRHP reference No.: 89001749
- Added to NRHP: November 1, 1989

The Lisbon Post Office in Lisbon, North Dakota, United States, is a post office building that was built in 1939. It was listed on the National Register of Historic Places in 1989 as U.S. Post Office-Lisbon.
