= Valley City Post Office =

- U.S. Post Office-Valley City
- U.S. National Register of Historic Places
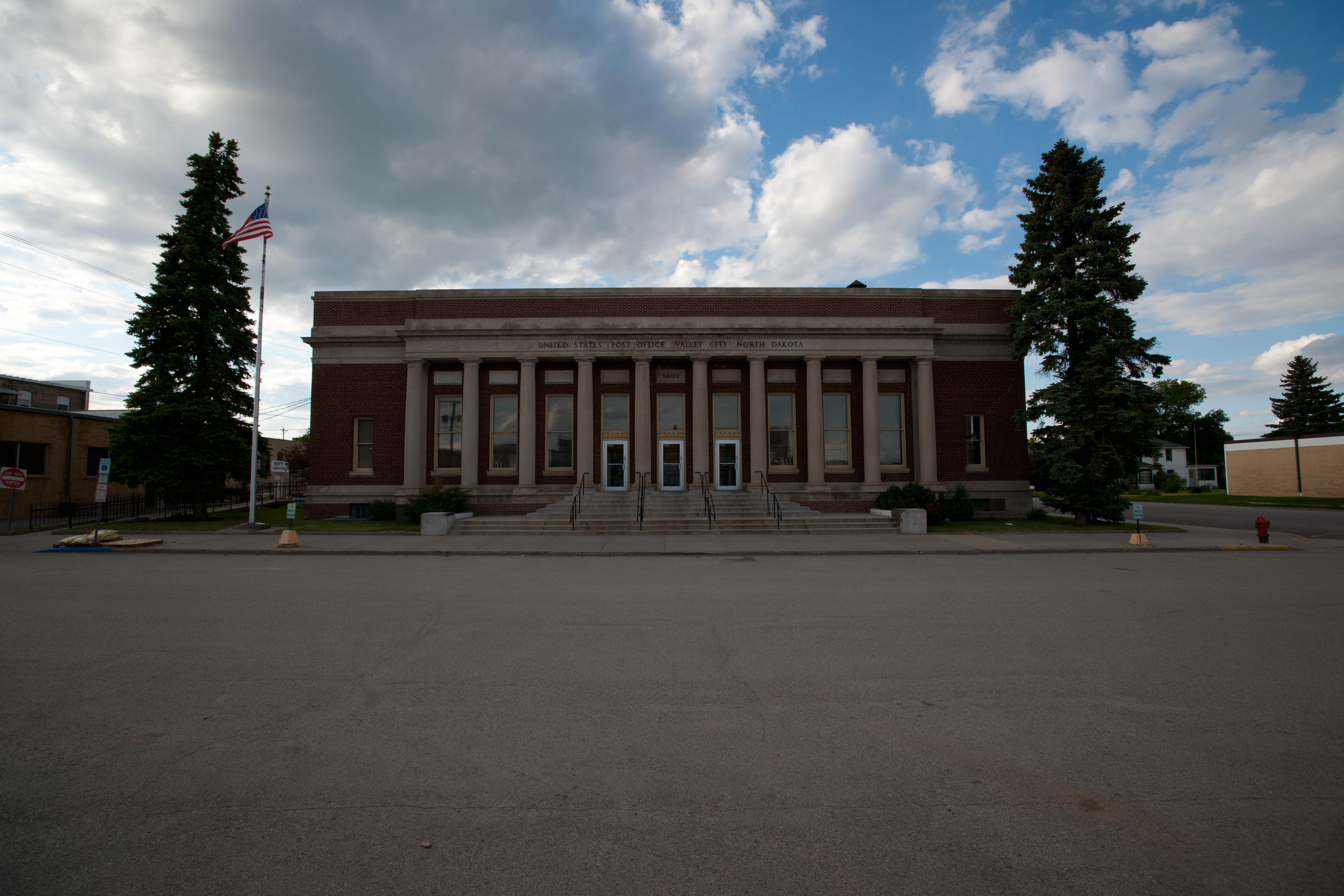

- Location within North Dakota Location within the United States
- Location: 149 NE. Third St., Valley City, North Dakota
- Coordinates: 46°55′32″N 98°0′5″W
- Area: less than one acre
- Built: 1916-17
- Built by: O'Neill, William, & Son
- Architect: Office of the Supervising Architect under James A. Wetmore
- Architectural style: Classical Revival
- MPS: US Post Offices in North Dakota, 1900-1940 MPS
- NRHP reference No.: 89001758
- Added to NRHP: November 1, 1989

The Valley City Post Office, in Valley City, North Dakota, was designed in 1915 and built during 1916–17. It was listed on the National Register of Historic Places in 1989 as U.S. Post Office-Valley City.

Its Classical Revival design is credited to the Office of the Supervising Architect under James A. Wetmore, and designed "in the spirit" of James Knox Taylor. It was built when post office designs were just beginning to be standardized, but shows individuality and does not follow any of the standardized plans that were adopted in 1915 at the national level. In fact, according to its NRHP nomination, it "was one of the last designs of its kind, and harks back to an earlier era when federal buildings were monolithic, imposing, costly, and built according to Beaux Arts principles of massing." It was described in a local newspaper account in 1916 as "'much more pretentious than most of the federal buildings that are being erected throughout the west when the size of the cities are taken into consideration'".
