= Dickinson Post Office =

- U.S. Post Office-Dickinson
- U.S. National Register of Historic Places
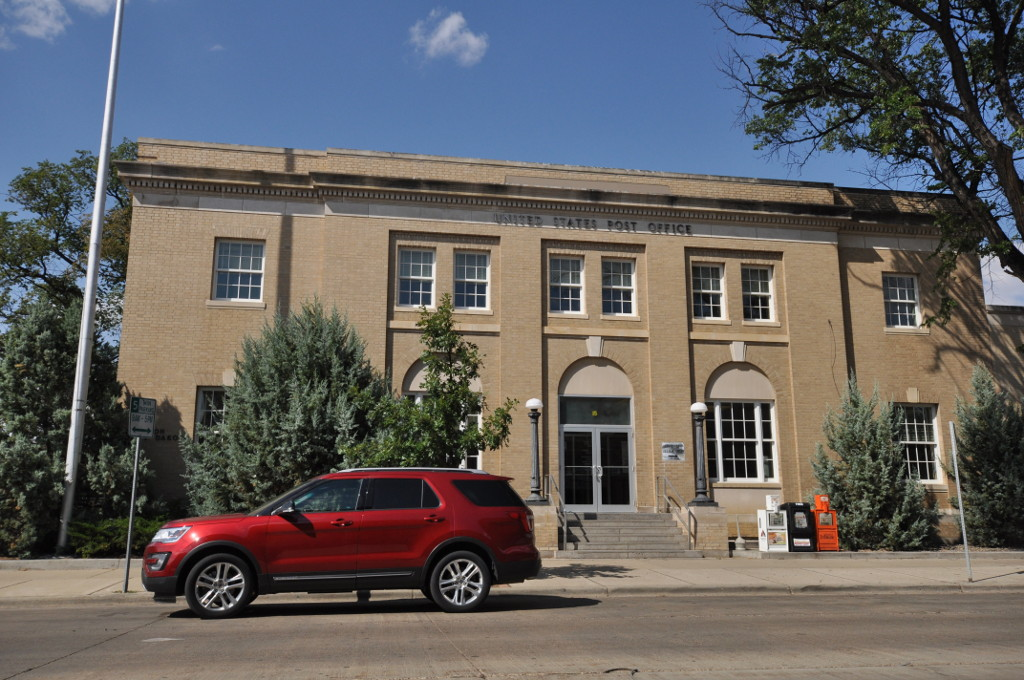

- Location within North Dakota Location within the United States
- Location: 15 E. First St., Dickinson, North Dakota
- Coordinates: 46°52′48″N 102°47′2″W
- Area: less than one acre
- Built: 1916
- Architect: Wetmore, James A.; Weitz, Charles, Sons
- Architectural style: Renaissance
- MPS: US Post Offices in North Dakota, 1900-1940 MPS
- NRHP reference No.: 89001757
- Added to NRHP: November 1, 1989

The Dickinson Post Office in Dickinson, North Dakota, is a post office building that was built in 1916. It was expanded to the east in 1965–66. It was listed on the National Register of Historic Places in 1989 as U.S. Post Office-Dickinson.

It is built to be fireproof, with hollow tile walls which are faced in gray pressed Hebron brick, laid in American bond. Ohio sandstone is used for trim, and polished granite is used for the front steps and the grade course.
