= Walcott, North Dakota =

- City
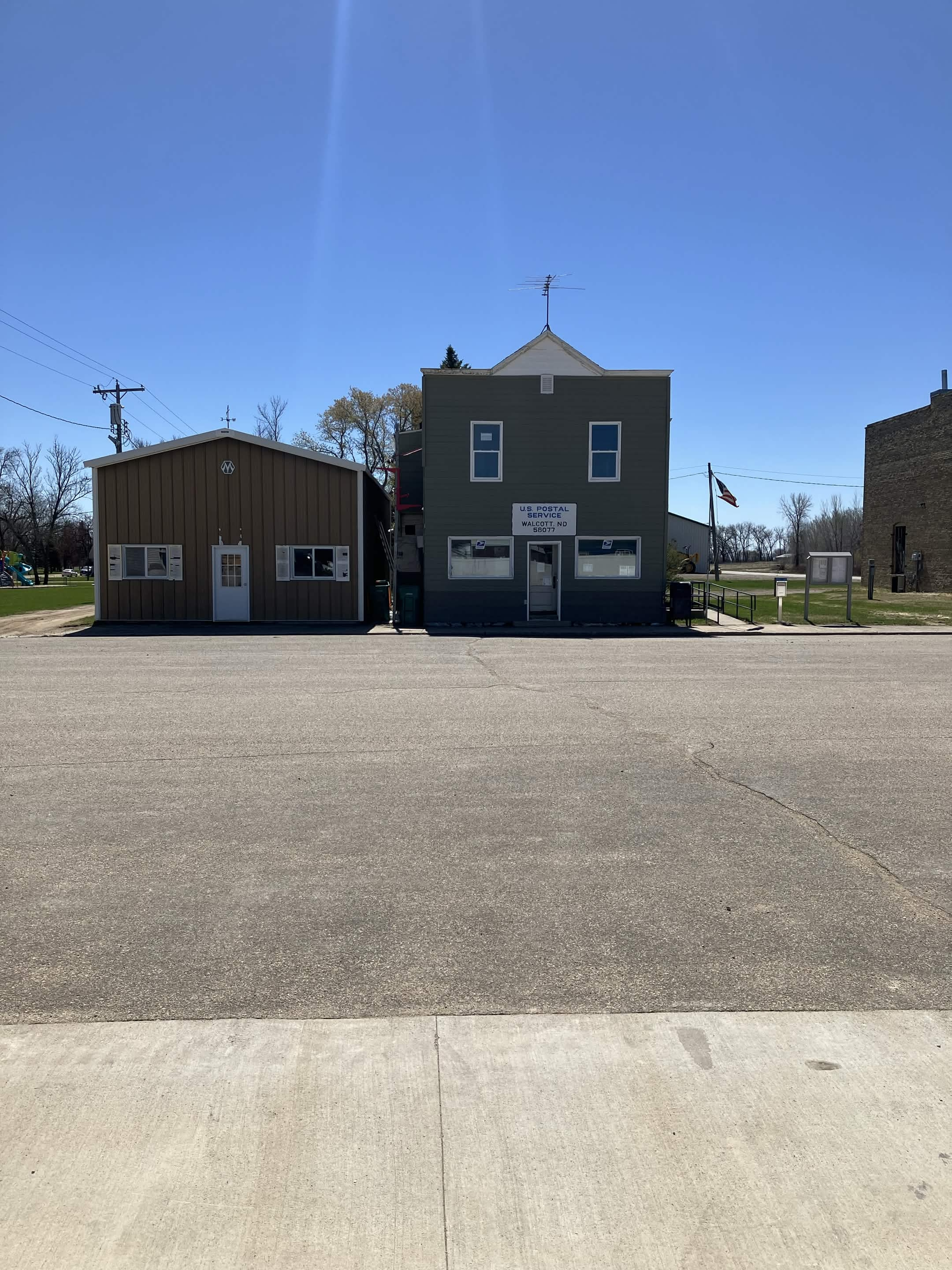
- Post office in Walcott

- Location of Walcott, North Dakota
- Coordinates: 46°33′02″N 96°56′15″W
- Country: United States
- State: North Dakota
- County: Richland
- Founded: 1880

Area
  - Total: 1.02 sq mi (2.63 km^{2})
  - Land: 1.02 sq mi (2.63 km^{2})
  - Water: 0 sq mi (0.00 km^{2})
- Elevation: 955 ft (291 m)

Population (2020)
  - Total: 262
  - Estimate (2022): 266
  - Density: 257.9/sq mi (99.59/km^{2})
- Time zone: UTC-6 (Central (CST))
  - Summer (DST): UTC-5 (CDT)
- ZIP code: 58077
- Area code: 701
- FIPS code: 38-82780
- GNIS feature ID: 1036312
- Website: www.cityofwalcott.org

Walcott is a city in Richland County, North Dakota, United States. The population was 262 at the 2020 census. Walcott was founded in 1880. It is part of the Wahpeton, ND–MN Micropolitan Statistical Area.

== Geography ==
According to the United States Census Bureau, the city has a total area of 1.02 square miles (2.64 km^{2}), all land.

== Demographics ==
Historical population
Census	Pop.	Note	%±
1890	53		—
1970	166		—
1980	186		12.0%
1990	178		−4.3%
2000	189		6.2%
2010	235		24.3%
2020	262		11.5%
2022 (est.)	266		1.5%
U.S. Decennial Census; 2020 Census

=== 2010 census ===
As of the census of 2010, there were 235 people, 94 households, and 66 families residing in the city. The population density was 230.4 inhabitants per square mile (89.0/km^{2}). There were 103 housing units at an average density of 101.0 per square mile (39.0/km^{2}). The racial makeup of the city was 96.6% White, 0.9% African American, 0.9% from other races, and 1.7% from two or more races. Hispanic or Latino of any race were 2.6% of the population.

There were 94 households, of which 35.1% had children under the age of 18 living with them, 59.6% were married couples living together, 8.5% had a female householder with no husband present, 2.1% had a male householder with no wife present, and 29.8% were non-families. 22.3% of all households were made up of individuals, and 8.5% had someone living alone who was 65 years of age or older. The average household size was 2.50 and the average family size was 2.98.

The median age in the city was 33.9 years. 28.9% of residents were under the age of 18; 3.5% were between the ages of 18 and 24; 32.8% were from 25 to 44; 21.7% were from 45 to 64; and 13.2% were 65 years of age or older. The gender makeup of the city was 51.1% male and 48.9% female.

=== 2000 census ===
As of the census of 2000, there were 189 people, 78 households, and 49 families residing in the city. The population density was 184.7 inhabitants per square mile (71.3/km^{2}). There were 89 housing units at an average density of 87.0 per square mile (33.6/km^{2}). The racial makeup of the city was 99.47% White, and 0.53% from two or more races. Hispanic or Latino of any race were 2.65% of the population.

There were 78 households, out of which 30.8% had children under the age of 18 living with them, 60.3% were married couples living together, 2.6% had a female householder with no husband present, and 35.9% were non-families. 29.5% of all households were made up of individuals, and 16.7% had someone living alone who was 65 years of age or older. The average household size was 2.42 and the average family size was 3.06.

In the city, the population was spread out, with 27.0% under the age of 18, 7.4% from 18 to 24, 28.0% from 25 to 44, 23.3% from 45 to 64, and 14.3% who were 65 years of age or older. The median age was 36 years. For every 100 females, there were 107.7 males. For every 100 females age 18 and over, there were 100.0 males.

The median income for a household in the city was $36,458, and the median income for a family was $42,500. Males had a median income of $30,417 versus $17,321 for females. The per capita income for the city was $16,173. About 1.9% of families and 6.0% of the population were below the poverty line, including 3.6% of those under the age of eighteen and 10.0% of those 65 or over.

== Public services ==
Walcott is served by the Richland County Sheriff's Office for law enforcement, the Walcott Fire Department for fire and rescue, and Kindred Ambulance Service for medical emergencies.
