= Post Office (Christine, North Dakota) =

- Formerly listed on the U.S. National Register of Historic Places
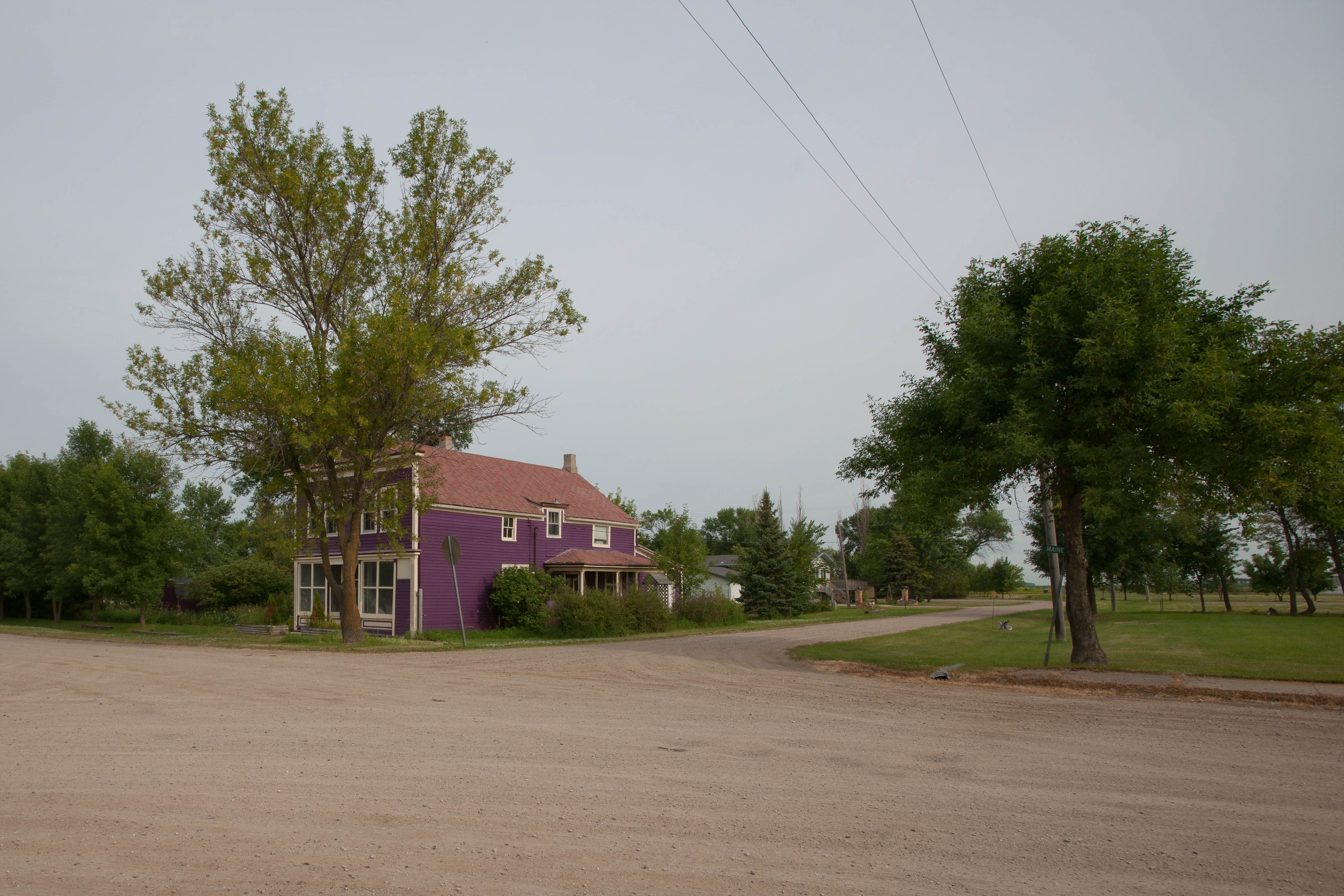
- In 2009 (near center, purple building)

- Location within North Dakota Location within the United States
- Location: Main and 3rd Sts., Christine, North Dakota
- Coordinates: 46°34′30″N 96°48′21″W
- Area: less than one acre
- Built: c.1895-98; 1906
- Architectural style: Boomtown
- NRHP reference No.: 77001028

Significant dates
- Added to NRHP: October 5, 1977
- Removed from NRHP: June 24, 2025

The Post Office, or Old Post Office, in Christine, North Dakota, United States, was built around 1895-98 and was moved in 1906. It was listed on the National Register of Historic Places in 1977.

It is a 1 1/2-story 25-by-67-foot (7.6 m × 20.4 m) building.
