= Christine, North Dakota =

- City
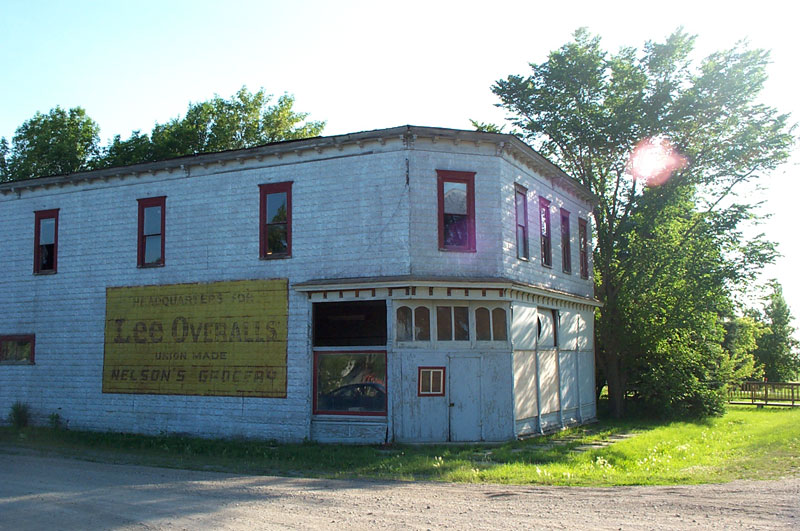
- Nelson's Grocery

- Location of Christine, North Dakota
- Coordinates: 46°34′31″N 96°48′24″W
- Country: United States
- State: North Dakota
- County: Richland
- Founded: 1883
- incorporated: 1976

Area
  - Total: 0.20 sq mi (0.53 km^{2})
  - Land: 0.20 sq mi (0.53 km^{2})
  - Water: 0 sq mi (0.00 km^{2})
- Elevation: 925 ft (282 m)

Population (2020)
  - Total: 151
  - Estimate (2024): 149
  - Density: 740.0/sq mi (285.73/km^{2})
- Time zone: UTC–6 (Central (CST))
  - Summer (DST): UTC–5 (CDT)
- ZIP Code: 58015
- Area code: 701
- FIPS code: 38-14100
- GNIS feature ID: 1035969

Christine is a city in Richland County, North Dakota, United States. The population was 151 at the 2020 census. Christine was founded in 1883. It is part of the Wahpeton, ND–MN Micropolitan Statistical Area.

== History ==
Christine was founded in 1883 as a Scandinavian settlement along the Milwaukee Railroad in Eagle Township. A post office was established in 1884, and the railroad built a depot in 1886. There is some disagreement over how the town received its name, with most of the evidence suggesting it was named after Christina Nilsson, a well-known Swedish opera singer. Others, though, suggest one of the town's early settlers, Knute Norby, wanted it named after him. The townspeople reportedly objected to his proposal, naming the town after his wife, Kristine.

The village was an unincorporated part of Eagle Township for much of its history, until it officially incorporated as a city in 1976.

Nelson's Grocery is listed on the U.S. National Register of Historic Places, as is the town post office.

== Geography ==
Christine is located in eastern Richland County, just off Interstate 29. Its location between the Red and Wild Rice Rivers places it within the Red River Valley. According to the United States Census Bureau, the city has a total area of 0.19 square miles (0.49 km^{2}), all land.

== Demographics ==
Historical population
Census	Pop.	Note	%±
1970	89		—
1980	147		65.2%
1990	140		−4.8%
2000	153		9.3%
2010	150		−2.0%
2020	151		0.7%
2024 (est.)	149		−1.3%
U.S. Decennial Census; 2020 Census

=== 2010 census ===
As of the 2010 census, there were 150 people, 61 households, and 44 families residing in the city. The population density was 789.5 inhabitants per square mile (304.8/km^{2}). There were 67 housing units at an average density of 352.6 per square mile (136.1/km^{2}). The racial makeup of the city was 98.0% White, 1.3% Asian, and 0.7% from other races. Hispanic or Latino people of any race were 2.7% of the population.

There were 61 households, of which 32.8% had children under the age of 18 living with them, 65.6% were married couples living together, 4.9% had a female householder with no husband present, 1.6% had a male householder with no wife present, and 27.9% were non-families. 24.6% of all households were made up of individuals, and 9.8% had someone living alone who was 65 years of age or older. The average household size was 2.46 and the average family size was 2.95.

The median age in the city was 37 years. 25.3% of residents were under the age of 18; 6.7% were between the ages of 18 and 24; 29.3% were from 25 to 44; 28.7% were from 45 to 64; and 10% were 65 years of age or older. The gender makeup of the city was 54.0% male and 46.0% female.

=== 2000 census ===
As of the 2000 census, there were 153 people, 60 households, and 43 families residing in the city. The population density was 846.1 inhabitants per square mile (326.7/km^{2}). There were 61 housing units at an average density of 337.4 per square mile (130.3/km^{2}). The racial makeup of the city was 99.35% White, and 0.65% from two or more races.

There were 60 households, out of which 36.7% had children under the age of 18 living with them, 63.3% were married couples living together, 6.7% had a female householder with no husband present, and 26.7% were non-families. 25.0% of all households were made up of individuals, and 6.7% had someone living alone who was 65 years of age or older. The average household size was 2.55 and the average family size was 3.07.

In the city, the population was spread out, with 24.2% under the age of 18, 8.5% from 18 to 24, 41.2% from 25 to 44, 20.3% from 45 to 64, and 5.9% who were 65 years of age or older. The median age was 37 years. For every 100 females, there were 109.6 males. For every 100 females age 18 and over, there were 118.9 males.

The median income for a household in the city was $51,458, and the median income for a family was $51,667. Males had a median income of $37,188 versus $20,000 for females. The per capita income for the city was $20,330. About 6.0% of families and 7.0% of the population were below the poverty line, including 10.6% of those under the age of eighteen and none of those 65 or over.

== Notable people ==
- Aslag Benson (1855 – 1937), state Senator (1903–1906)
- John S. Johnson (1854 – 1941), state Senator (1897-1900)
- Paul Johnsgard (1931 – 2021), ornithologist

== Trivia ==
The band Tullycraft has two songs about the city: "Christine, ND" and "Vacation in Christine, ND".
