= Old U.S. Post Office (Williston, North Dakota) =

- U.S. National Register of Historic Places
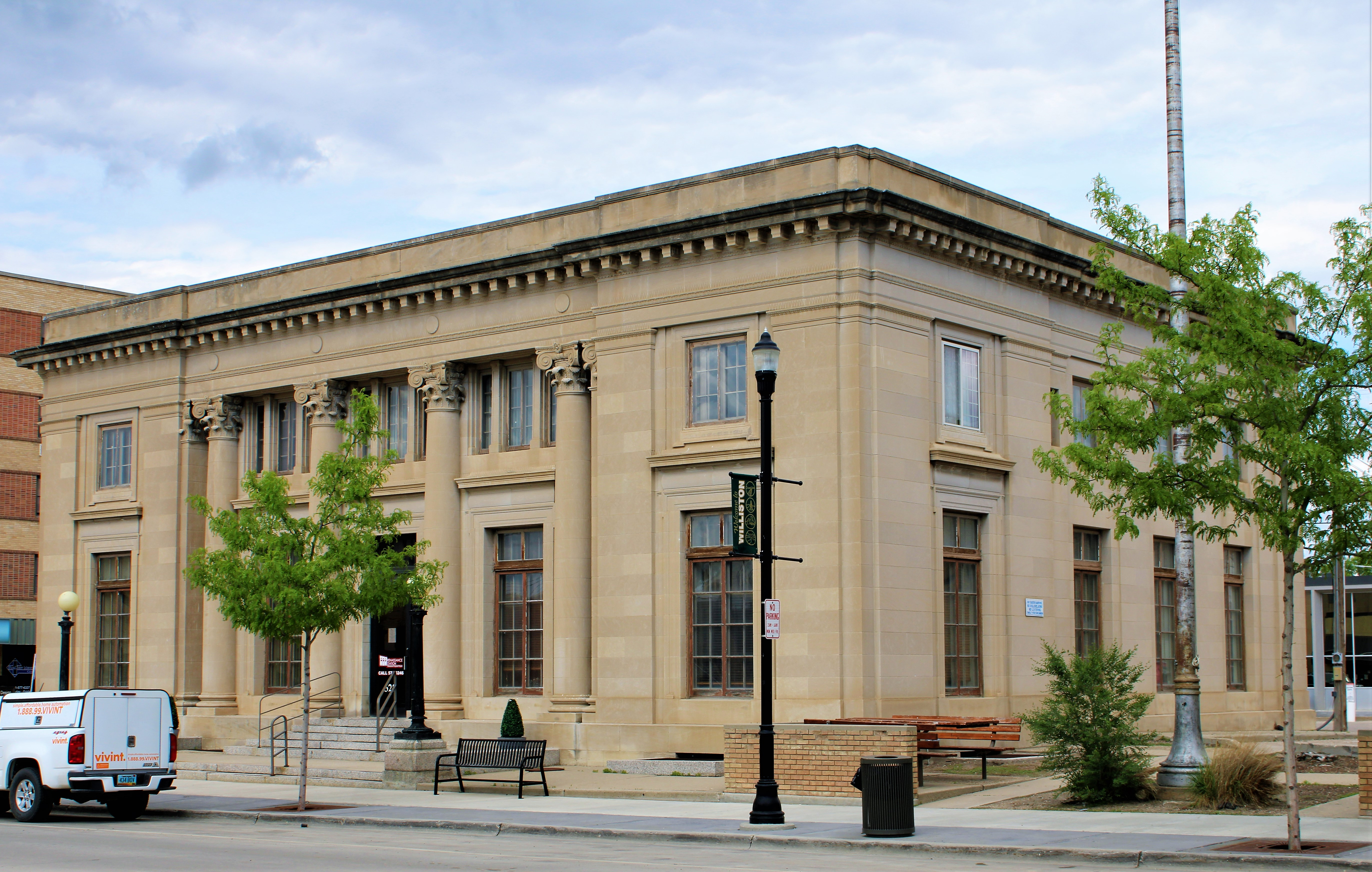

- Location within North Dakota Location within the United States
- Location: 322 Main Ave. Williston, North Dakota
- Coordinates: 48°8′50″N 103°37′30″W
- Area: less than one acre
- Built: 1915
- Architect: Oscar Wenderoth
- Architectural style: Classical Revival
- NRHP reference No.: 79003729
- Added to NRHP: October 22, 1979

The Old U.S. Post Office in Williston, North Dakota, United States, is a former post office building that was built in 1915. It was listed on the National Register of Historic Places in 1979.

It served as a post office from 1915 to 1969 and had other Federal offices in it as well. According to its NRHP nomination, the "massiveness and colossal columns of the building are ... a very visible reminder of the Federal presence and function in Williston, a town isolated by distance from state and national governmental centers." It was then owned by the city of Williston and plans were for it to be renovated and used by the local government.
