= Mooreton, North Dakota =

- City
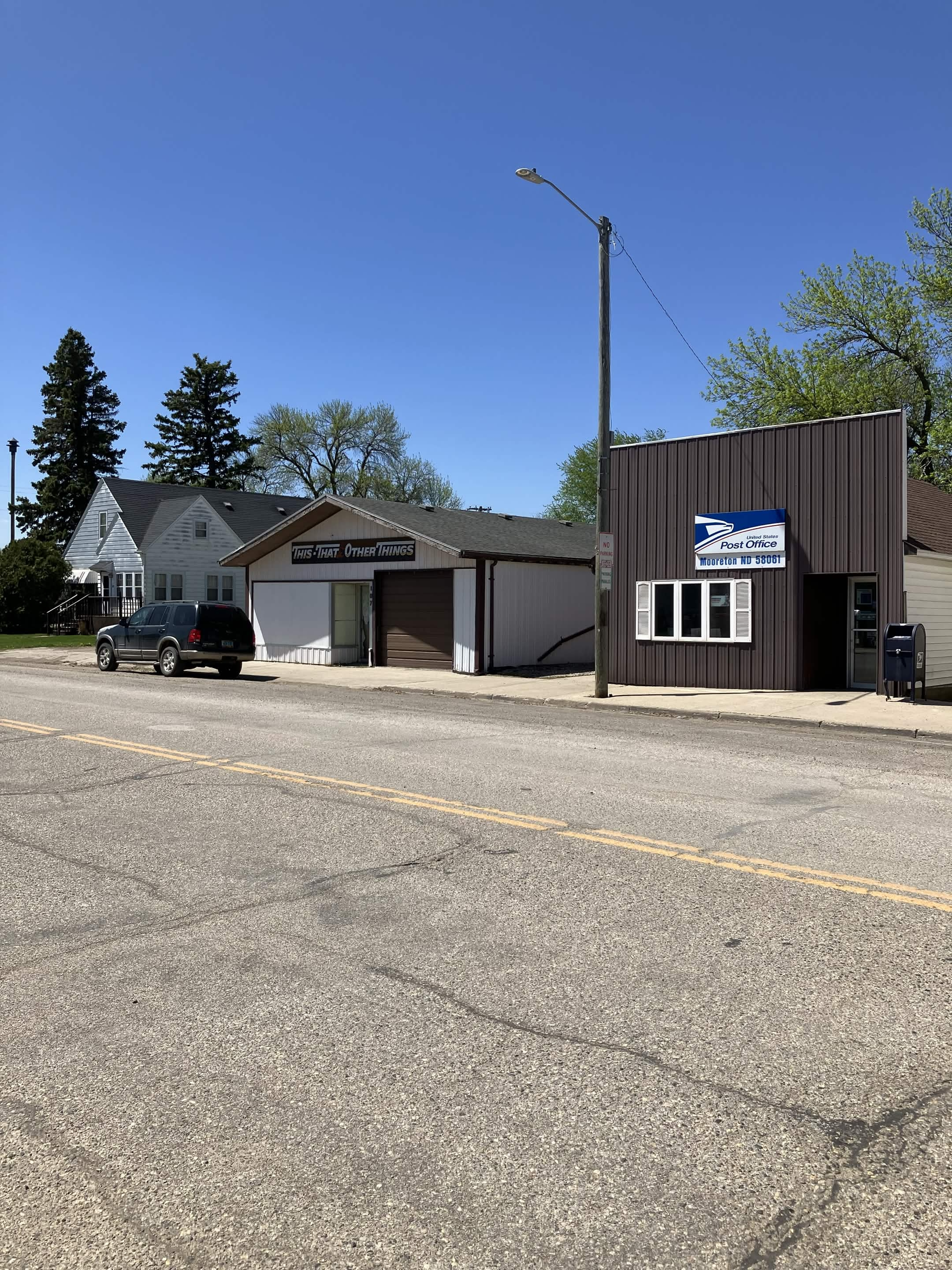

- Location of Mooreton, North Dakota
- Coordinates: 46°16′08″N 96°52′32″W
- Country: United States
- State: North Dakota
- County: Richland
- Founded: 1884

Area
  - Total: 0.27 sq mi (0.69 km^{2})
  - Land: 0.27 sq mi (0.69 km^{2})
  - Water: 0 sq mi (0.00 km^{2})
- Elevation: 971 ft (296 m)

Population (2020)
  - Total: 177
  - Estimate (2022): 175
  - Density: 662.2/sq mi (255.67/km^{2})
- Time zone: UTC-6 (Central (CST))
  - Summer (DST): UTC-5 (CDT)
- ZIP code: 58061
- Area code: 701
- FIPS code: 38-54220
- GNIS feature ID: 1036170
- Website: mooreton.municipalimpact.com

Mooreton is a city in Richland County, North Dakota, United States. The population was 177 at the 2020 census. Mooreton was founded in 1884. It is part of the Wahpeton, ND–MN Micropolitan Statistical Area.

== Geography ==
According to the United States Census Bureau, the city has a total area of 0.27 square miles (0.70 km^{2}), all land.

== Demographics ==
Historical population
Census	Pop.	Note	%±
1920	123		—
1930	147		19.5%
1940	146		−0.7%
1950	161		10.3%
1960	164		1.9%
1970	158		−3.7%
1980	216		36.7%
1990	193		−10.6%
2000	204		5.7%
2010	197		−3.4%
2020	177		−10.2%
2022 (est.)	175		−1.1%
U.S. Decennial Census; 2020 Census

=== 2010 census ===
As of the census of 2010, there were 197 people, 83 households, and 56 families residing in the city. The population density was 729.6 inhabitants per square mile (281.7/km^{2}). There were 92 housing units at an average density of 340.7 per square mile (131.5/km^{2}). The racial makeup of the city was 93.9% White, 3.6% Native American, 0.5% Asian, and 2.0% from two or more races.

There were 83 households, of which 36.1% had children under the age of 18 living with them, 56.6% were married couples living together, 3.6% had a female householder with no husband present, 7.2% had a male householder with no wife present, and 32.5% were non-families. 26.5% of all households were made up of individuals, and 8.4% had someone living alone who was 65 years of age or older. The average household size was 2.37 and the average family size was 2.89.

The median age in the city was 34.7 years. 24.9% of residents were under the age of 18; 6.7% were between the ages of 18 and 24; 32% were from 25 to 44; 24.3% were from 45 to 64; and 12.2% were 65 years of age or older. The gender makeup of the city was 55.3% male and 44.7% female.

=== 2000 census ===
As of the census of 2000, there were 204 people, 92 households, and 49 families residing in the city. The population density was 769.7 inhabitants per square mile (297.2/km^{2}). There were 95 housing units at an average density of 358.5 per square mile (138.4/km^{2}). The racial makeup of the city was 98.04% White and 1.96% Native American. Hispanic or Latino of any race were 0.49% of the population.

There were 92 households, out of which 21.7% had children under the age of 18 living with them, 48.9% were married couples living together, 1.1% had a female householder with no husband present, and 46.7% were non-families. 38.0% of all households were made up of individuals, and 15.2% had someone living alone who was 65 years of age or older. The average household size was 2.22 and the average family size was 3.10.

In the city, the population was spread out, with 25.5% under the age of 18, 9.3% from 18 to 24, 31.9% from 25 to 44, 15.7% from 45 to 64, and 17.6% who were 65 years of age or older. The median age was 35 years. For every 100 females, there were 100.0 males. For every 100 females age 18 and over, there were 100.0 males.

The median income for a household in the city was $29,375, and the median income for a family was $48,281. Males had a median income of $27,361 versus $22,500 for females. The per capita income for the city was $16,434. About 9.1% of families and 11.5% of the population were below the poverty line, including 2.3% of those under the age of eighteen and none of those 65 or over.
