= Wahpeton Post Office =

- U.S. Post Office-Wahpeton
- U.S. National Register of Historic Places
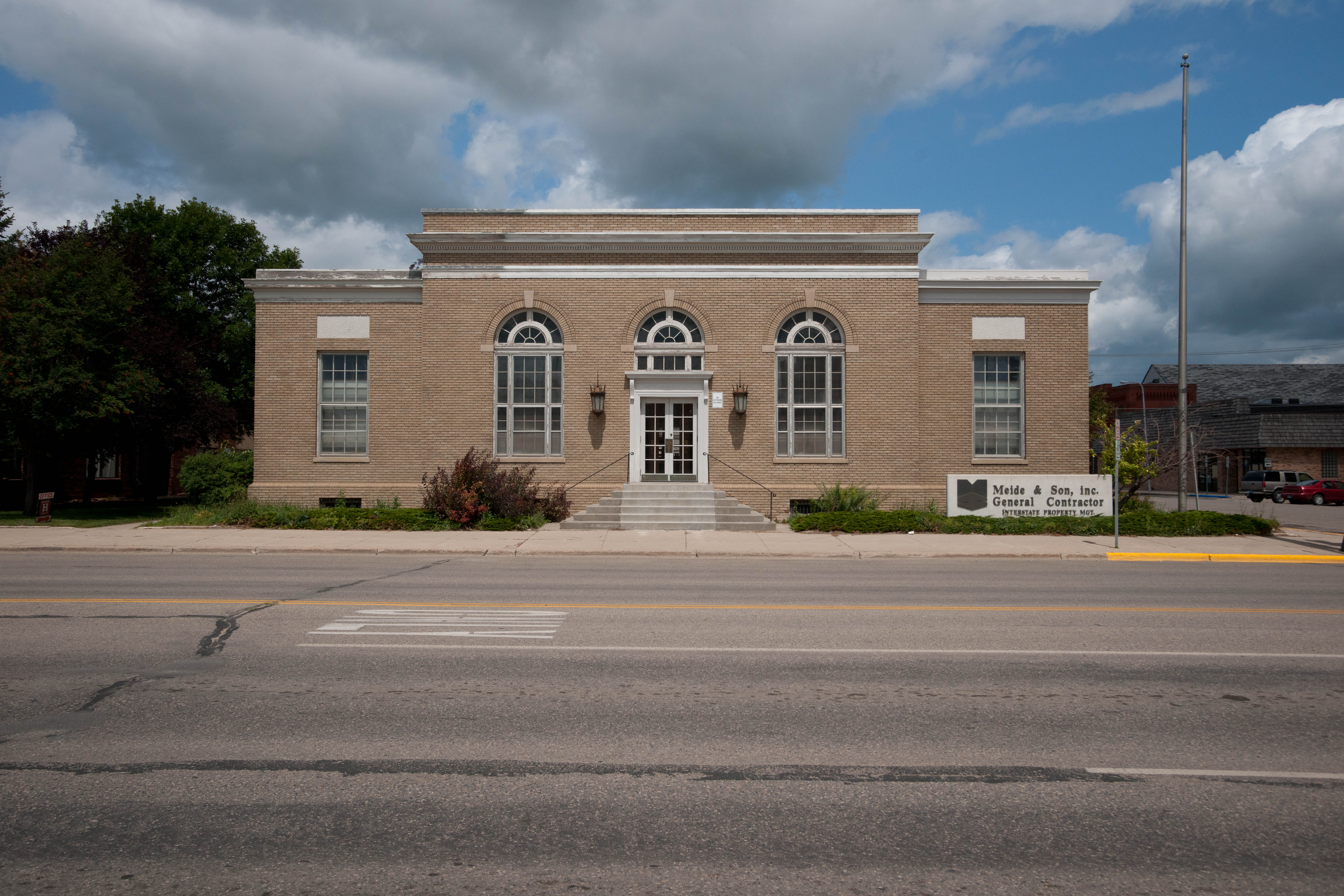

- Location within North Dakota Location within the United States
- Location: 620 Dakota Ave., Wahpeton, North Dakota
- Coordinates: 46°15′51″N 96°36′30″W
- Area: less than one acre
- Built: 1914
- Architect: Wenderoth, Oscar; Schuler, Eugene
- Architectural style: Classical Revival
- MPS: US Post Offices in North Dakota, 1900-1940 MPS
- NRHP reference No.: 89001759
- Added to NRHP: November 1, 1989

The Wahpeton Post Office in Wahpeton, North Dakota, United States, is a post office building that was built in 1914. It was listed on the National Register of Historic Places in 1989 as U.S. Post Office-Wahpeton.
