= Grafton Post Office (Grafton, North Dakota) =

- U.S. Post Office-Grafton
- U.S. National Register of Historic Places
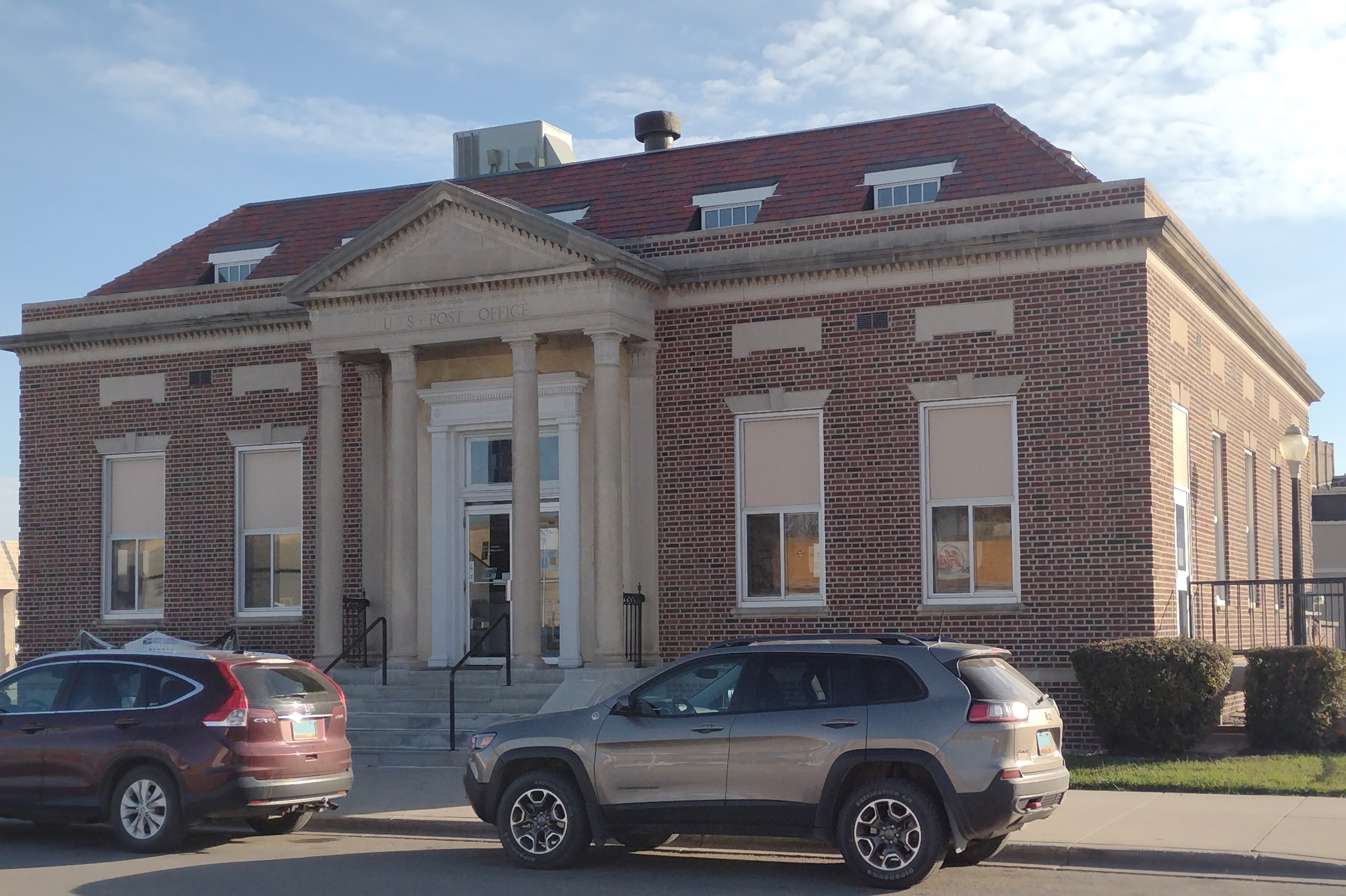

- Location within North Dakota Location within the United States
- Location: 506 S. Griggs Ave. Grafton, North Dakota
- Coordinates: 48°25′9″N 97°24′42″W
- Area: less than one acre
- Built: 1932
- Built by: West Englewood Construction & Supply
- Architect: James A. Wetmore
- Architectural style: Colonial Revival
- MPS: US Post Offices in North Dakota, 1900--1940 MPS
- NRHP reference No.: 89001756
- Added to NRHP: November 1, 1989

The Grafton Post Office in Grafton, North Dakota, United States, is a Colonial Revival building completed in 1932. It was listed on the National Register of Historic Places as U.S. Post Office-Grafton in 1989.
