= Richland County Courthouse (North Dakota) =

- U.S. National Register of Historic Places
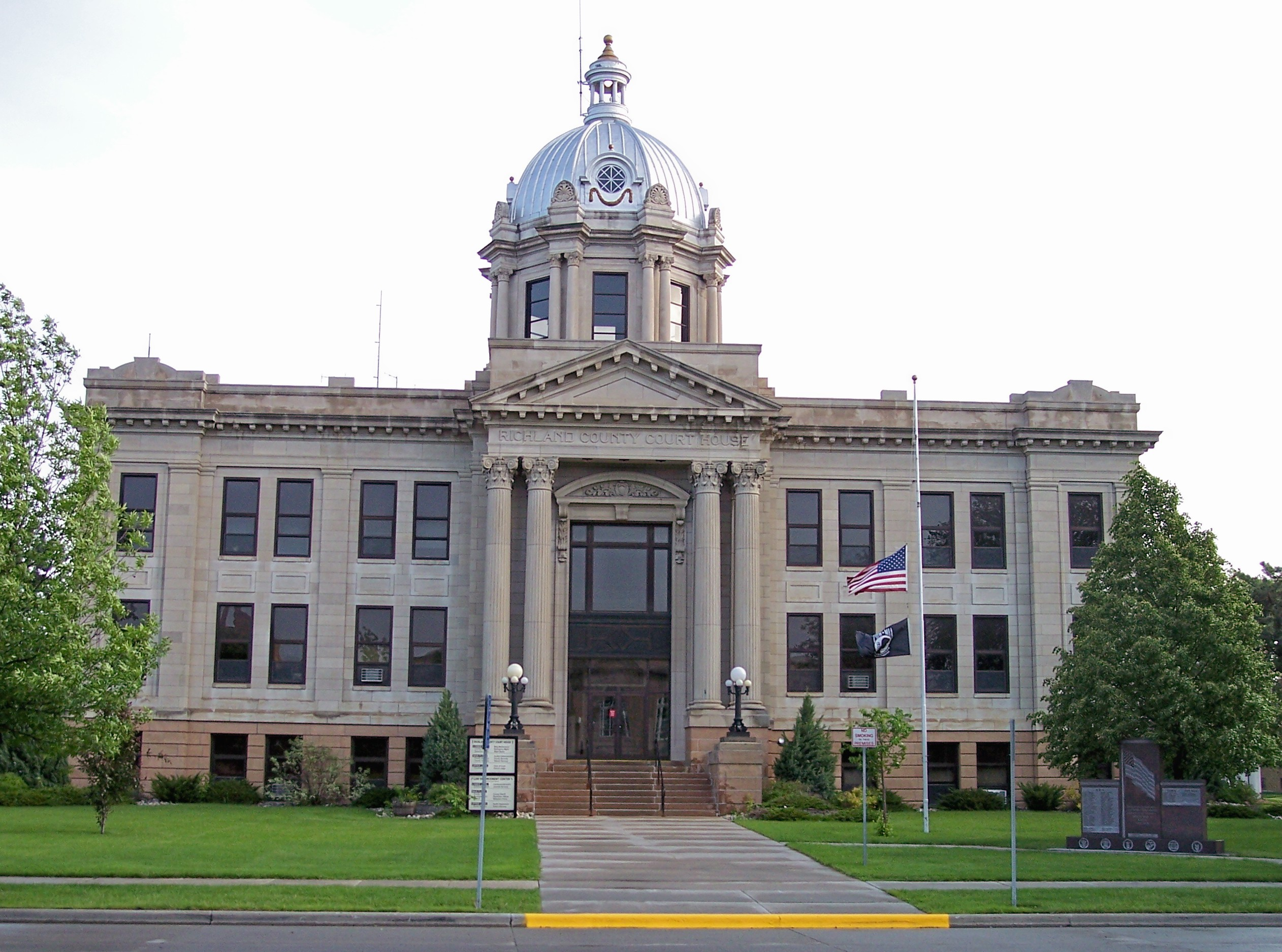
- Richland County Courthouse, May 2007

- Location within North Dakota Location within the United States
- Interactive map showing the location of Richland County Courthouse
- Location: 418 2nd Ave N, Wahpeton, North Dakota
- Coordinates: 46°16′3″N 96°36′23″W
- Built: 1912
- Architect: Buechner & Orth
- Architectural style: Beaux Arts
- MPS: Buechner and Orth Courthouses in North Dakota TR
- NRHP reference No.: 80002926
- Added to NRHP: November 25, 1980

The Richland County Courthouse in Wahpeton, North Dakota, USA, was built in 1912. It was designed by the architects Buechner & Orth in Beaux Arts style. It was listed on the National Register of Historic Places in 1980.

Its exterior is built of Bedford limestone atop "rusticated Kettle River sandstone". The front facade features four Corinithian columns. The building has an octagonal limestone tower with windows on all eight sides and a metal-covered dome topped by a ball finial. The interior rotunda features murals with white marble and terrazzo.
