= William Murphy =

William, Bill or Billy Murphy may refer to:

== Arts and entertainment ==
- William B. Murphy (1908–1970), American film editor
- William Murphy (actor) (1921–1989), American actor
- Bill Murphy (Irish actor) (born 1963), Irish actor, writer and producer
- Billy Murphy (fashion entrepreneur) (1940–2014), British fashion entrepreneur
- Bishop William Murphy III (born 1973), American gospel musician & pastor
- Willy Murphy (William Henry Murphy, 1936–1976), American underground cartoonist

== Business and industry ==
- William John Murphy (1839–1923), American businessman, founder of Glendale, Arizona
- William Martin Murphy (1844–1919), Irish industrialist and newspaper proprietor, involved in the Dublin Lockout
- William Dennistoun Murphy (1859–1935), American real estate manager
- William Lawrence Murphy (1876–1959), Irish-American inventor of the Murphy bed
- William Beverly Murphy (1907–1994), American food industry executive
- William J. Murphy (journalist) (1859–1918), American newspaper proprietor

== Politics and law ==
=== Australia ===
- William Edward Murphy (1833–1881), Australian politician, member of the Queensland Legislative Assembly
- William Murphy (Australian politician) (1858–1929), Australian politician, member of the New South Wales and Western Australian parliaments
- William Murphy (Queensland politician) (1868–1930), Australian politician and newspaper proprietor, member of the Queensland Legislative Assembly
- William Emmett Murphy (1841–1921), Australian trade unionist and politician

=== U.S. ===
- William Sumter Murphy (1796–1844), American lawyer and diplomat
- William P. Murphy (judge) (1898–1986), American attorney, member of the Minnesota Supreme Court
- William T. Murphy (1899–1978), American politician, U.S. representative from Illinois
- W. Tayloe Murphy (1901–1962), American politician from Virginia
- William J. Murphy (Idaho politician) (1912–1993), American politician, lieutenant governor of Idaho
- W. Tayloe Murphy Jr. (1933–2021), American politician from Virginia
- Billy Murphy Jr. (born 1943), American attorney, judge, and civil rights advocate
- William H. Murphy Sr. (1917–2003), American judge, lawyer, and civil rights activist
- William L. Murphy (1944–2010), American lawyer, Staten Island (Richmond County) district attorney
- William J. Murphy (Rhode Island politician) (born 1963), American politician, Rhode Island state representative
- William Murphy (Wisconsin legislator), Irish-born American merchant, member of the Wisconsin State Assembly
- William K. Murphy ( 1834–1911), Illinois politician, lawyer and businessman
- William Patrick Murphy (1920–2007), professor and author on the subject of Constitutional law

=== Elsewhere ===
- William Samuel Murphy (1882–1961), Canadian politician
- William Lindsay Murphy (1888–1965), British governor of the Bahamas
- William Murphy (Irish politician) (1892–1967), Irish Fine Gael TD
- William J. Murphy (Labour politician) (1928–2018), Irish Labour Party politician

== Religion ==
- William Murphy (bishop of Saginaw) (1885–1950), American Roman Catholic bishop
- William Murphy (bishop of Kerry) (born 1936), Irish Roman Catholic bishop
- William Murphy (bishop of Rockville Centre) (1940–2026), American Roman Catholic bishop
- William J. Murphy (Jesuit) (1895–1973), American educator and president of Boston College
- William Murphy (activist) (1834–1872), Irish anti-Catholic activist and public lecturer

== Sport ==
=== Baseball ===
- Yale Murphy (William Henry Murphy, 1869–1906), American Major League Baseball player and college football coach
- Billy Murphy (baseball) (1944–2024), American Major League Baseball outfielder
- Bill Murphy (pitcher) (born 1981), American Major League Baseball pitcher
- Bill Murphy (baseball coach) (born 1989), American baseball coach
- Willie Murphy (baseball) (William H. Murphy, 1864–?), American Major League Baseball player

=== Other sports ===
- Torpedo Billy Murphy (1863–1939), featherweight boxer from New Zealand
- William Murphy (lacrosse) (1867–1957), American Olympic lacrosse player
- William Murphy (rugby union) (c.1880–c.1957), Australian rugby union footballer
- William Murphy (rower) (1889–1916), Canadian Olympic rower
- Billy Murphy (footballer) (1895–1962), English footballer
- William Murphy (boxer) (1903–1979), Irish Olympic boxer
- William Murphy (tennis) (1917–2005), American tennis player and coach
- Bill Murphy (footballer) (1921–2004), English footballer
- Bill Murphy (Gaelic footballer), scored the decisive goal in the 1896 All-Ireland Senior Football Championship final
- Billy J. Murphy (1921–2008), American college football coach at the University of Memphis
- Bill Murphy (businessman) (born 1946), American NFL football player and businessman
- Bill Murphy (American football) (1914–1985), American football guard
- Willie Murphy (Cork hurler) (William Murphy, 1913–1977), Irish hurler and hurling selector

== Others ==
- William Cameron Murphy (1905–1961), Canadian lawyer and Canadian Army officer
- William P. Murphy (1892–1987), American physician and Nobel laureate
- William J. Murphy (RAF officer) (1916–1939), British Royal Air Force pilot
- William P. Murphy Jr. (1923–2023), American scientist and inventor

== See also ==
- Willie Murphy (disambiguation)
