= Munirathna Anandakrishnan =

Indian educationist and civil engineer (1928–2021)

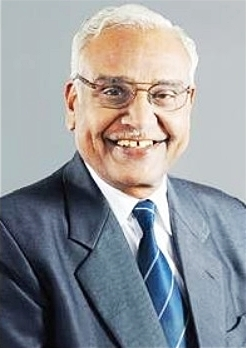
- Born: 12 July 1928; Vaniyambadi, Madras Presidency, British India
- Died: 29 May 2021 (aged 92); Chennai, Tamil Nadu, India
- Education: College of Engineering, Guindy, University of Minnesota
- Occupation: Educationist
- Years active: 1960–2021
- Children: 3
- Awards: Padma Shri; National Order of Scientific Merit (Brazil); UM Distinguished Leadership Award; Order of Ski-U-Mah; Engineering Personality Award; TNF Excellence Award; M. K. Nambiar Memorial Award Rotary Vocational Service Award; For the Sake of Honour Award; National Science and Technology Award; Ugadi Puraskar; Man of the Year 1999; Platinum Jubilee Award; ICCES Outstanding Achievement Award; UGC National Swami Pranavananda Saraswati Award

Munirathna Anandakrishnan (12 July 1928 – 29 May 2021) was an Indian civil engineer, educationist, a chairman of the Indian Institute of Technology, Kanpur and a vice-chancellor of Anna University. He was also an Advisor to the Government of Tamil Nadu on Information Technology and e-Governance. A winner of the National Order of Scientific Merit (Brazil), he was honored by the Government of India, in 2002, with Padma Shri, the fourth highest Indian civilian award.

== Biography ==
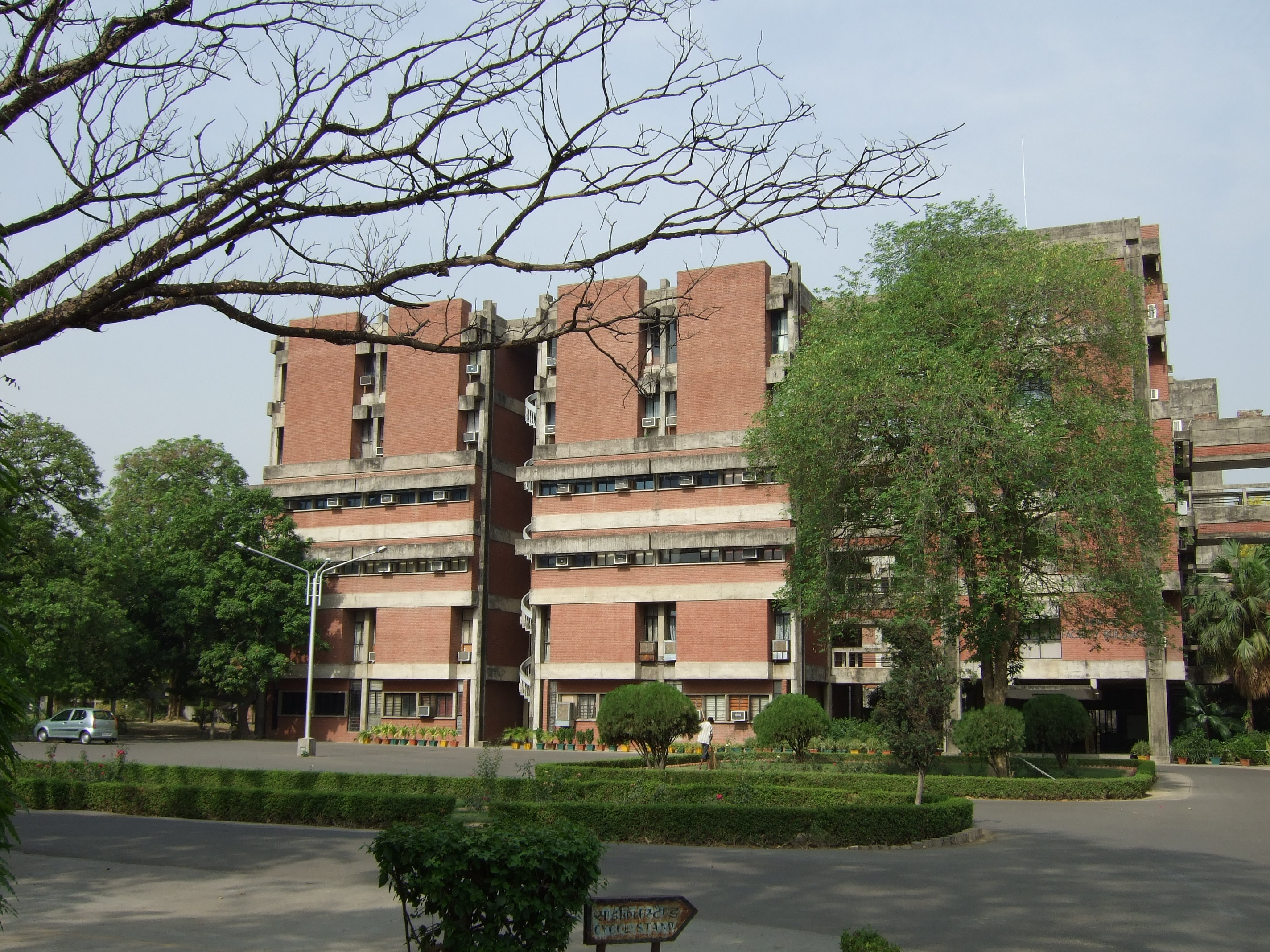
A building at IIT Kanpur

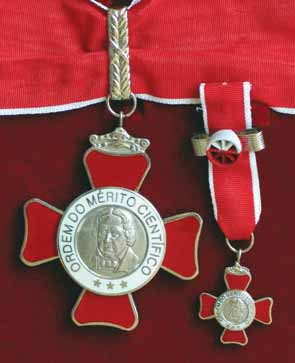
Brazil National Order of Scientific Merit

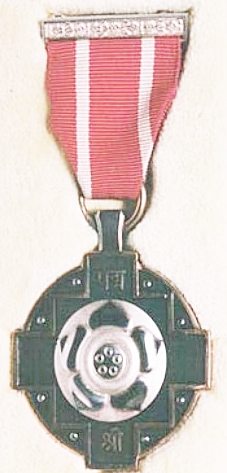
Padma Shri Award

Munirathna Anandakrishnan was born on 12 July 1928 in the south Indian state of Tamil Nadu. After graduating in civil engineering (BE) from the College of Engineering, Guindy, Madras University in 1952, he pursued his studies at the University of Minnesota from where he secured a master's degree (MS) in 1957 and a PhD in civil engineering in 1960. During his doctoral studies, he was a teaching assistant at the university and was the president of the Indian Students Association and Foreign Students Council at the university. He also worked part-time at Twin City Testing and Engineering Laboratories, a private firm, as a materials engineer

Anandakrishnan returned to India in 1962 and started his Indian career as a Grade I Senior Scientific Officer at the Central Road Research Institute, Delhi and worked there for a year. His next posting was as a member of the faculty of civil engineering at the Indian Institute of Technology, Kanpur (IIT Kanpur) where he worked till 1974, holding various positions such as assistant professor, professor, senior Professor, chairman of civil engineering department, dean and acting director. He also served IIT Kanpur as the chairman of the central staff recruiting committee and as the advisor on campus development.

In 1974, Anandakrishnan moved to the US, on deputation from the Department of Science and Technology to work as the science counsellor at the Indian embassy in Washington D.C. In 1978, he joined the United Nations Commission on Science and Technology for Development (CSTD) as the chief of new technologies at the Office of Science and Technology (OST), where he worked till his retirement from UN service in 1989. At the United Nations, he also held the posts of the deputy director at the Commission on Science and Technology for Development (CSTD) and the secretary of the UN Advisory Committee on Science and Technology for Development (UNACAST).

In 1990, Anandakrishnan returned to India to take up the position as the vice chancellor of Anna University, Tamil Nadu and served the institution for two consecutive terms till 1996. During this period, he was also a member of an International Expert Committee for the development of Science and Technology in Brazil and was involved in its activities till 1997. After his second tenure as the vice chancellor, he was appointed the vice chairman of the Tamil Nadu State Council for Higher Education (TANSCHE) and also held the post of the Advisor to the Chief Minister of Tamil Nadu on matters related to Information Technology and E-Governance. In his advisory role, he was responsible for replacing the Common Entrance Test system with the Single Window Admission System for admission to engineering courses across Tamil Nadu. Anandakrishnan retired from active service in 2001 and lived with his family at Kasturibai Nagar, in Adyar, Chennai.

On 29 May 2021, he died due to COVID-19.

== Positions ==
Post retirement, Anandakrishnan is known to have been active by involving himself with many institutions and organizations. He was the honorary chairman of the Board of Governors of the Indian Institute of Technology, Kanpur and held the chair of the Higher Education Committee of the Federation of Indian Chamber of Commerce and Industries (FICCI). He was a member of the executive councils of the University of Kerala, Central University of Haryana, Sikkim University and the National University of Educational Planning and Administration (NUEPA). He was a former chairman of Science City, Tamil Nadu, Madras Institute of Development Studies (MIDS), the High-Power Committee for the Review and Reorientation of the Undergraduate Engineering Education in India and the Board of Undergraduate Studies of the All India Council for Technical Education (AICTE), New Delhi.

Anandakrishnan was the president of the Madras Science Association and Tamil Nadu Academy of Sciences and a member of the Indian Society for Technical Education and the Indian Society for Theoretical and Applied Mechanics. He was also associated as a member with organizations such as Madras School of Economics, A. M. M. Murugappa Chettiar Research Centre, C. P. R. Environmental Education Centre, Tamil Virtual University, Assam University, Tamil Nadu Foundation, Citizen Consumer and Civic Action Group (CAG), Madras Management Association, Madras Craft Foundation, Tamil Nadu Council for Sustainable Livelihood, MS Swaminathan Research Foundation, and International Forum for Information Technology in Tamil, Singapore, (INFITT). He was a member of the Managing Committee of the Tamil Nadu chapter of the Transparency International, a trustee of the Information Technology Bar of India, Chennai, a trustee and subsequently the chairman of the Ranganathan Centre for Information Studies and held the chair of the Academic Advisory Committee of the National Assessment and Accreditation Council (NAAC), Bangalore.

Anandakrishnan was a former chairman of several University Grants Commission committees and panel such as Engineering and Technology panel, Committee on Specification of Degrees, Expert Committee to review the Maintenance Grant Norms for Delhi Colleges and the Expert Committee to examine the proposals for starting new Academic Staff Colleges. He has also headed the AICTE committees like Sectoral Committee of the National Board of Accreditation, Southern Regional Committee, Standing Committee on Entry and Operation of Foreign Universities in India and All India Board of Under Graduate Studies in Engineering and Technology. He has also been associated as a member with the academic advisory council of Pondicherry University and with the National Assessment and Accreditation Council (NAAC), Bangalore.

== Publications ==
Anandakrishnan is the author of a book and the editor of three more on educational and technical aspects of engineering.

- Science, Technology and Society
- Engineering Graphics
- Planning and Popularizing Science and Technology in Developing Countries
- Trends and Prospects in Planning and Management of Science and Technology for Development

He is also credited with over 100 articles in peer reviewed national and international journals.

== Awards and recognitions ==
Munirathna Anandakrishan won the Order of the Ski-Uh-Mah from the University of Minnesota in 1958 for his activities during his studies at the institution. In 1972, he received the Indian Invention Promotion Award for developing the design of a radial permeability measuring device. The Institution of Engineers (India) selected him for the Engineering Personality Award in 1992 for his contribution in liaising with UN agencies. The next year, he received two awards, the TNF Excellence Award from the Tamil Nadu Foundation and the M. K. Nambiar Memorial Award from the Madras Institute of Magnetobiology. A year later, Rotary International, Meenambakkam awarded him the Rotary Vocational Service Award. Rotary Club of Madras followed it with the For the Sake of Honour Award the next year. He received one more award, the National Science and Technology Award for Excellence in 1995.

The Government of Brazil conferred on him the Commander of the National Order of Scientific Merit (Brazil) in 1996 and the same year, he received the Ugadi Puraskar from the Madras Telugu Academy. The International Institute of Tamil Studies honoured him in 1999 and the Centenarian Trust, Chennai selected him as the Man of the Year 1999. The Government of India awarded him the civilian honour of Padma Shri in 2002 and the University of Minnesota awarded him the Distinguished Leader Award in 2003. The year 2004 brought him two awards, the Platinum Jubilee Award of the Indian Ceramics Society and the ICCES Outstanding Achievement Award from the International Conference on Computational and Experimental Engineering and Sciences.

Anandakrishnan was an elected Fellow of the National Academy of Sciences, India and the Institution of Engineers (India). He was also a Fellow of the Indian Society of Technical Education. Kanpur University honoured Anandakrishnan with the title of Doctor of Science (Honoris Causa) in 2005. The University Grants Commission (India) awarded him the UGC National Swami Pranavananda Saraswati Award in 2006.

== Publications ==
- Anandakrishnan, Munirathna, ed. (1983). Planning and Popularizing Science and Technology in Developing Countries. Tycooly Publications. OCLC 822708930.
- Anandakrishnan, Munirathna, ed. (1984). Trends and Prospects in Planning and Management of Science and Technology for Development. United Nations Centre for Science and Technology for Development.
- Stanke, Klaus-Heinrich; Anandakrishnan, Munirathna, eds. (1980). Science, Technology and Society. Pergamon. ISBN 9781483148281.
- Anandakrishnan, Munirathna; Siddiqi, R.H. (184). Engineering Graphics. Prentice Hall. ISBN 978-0876920015.

== See also ==
- Commission on Science and Technology for Development
- Indian Institute of Technology, Kanpur
- Madras Institute of Development Studies
- University of Minnesota
