= William J. Murphy (journalist) =

American journalist

William James Murphy (July 25, 1859 – October 24, 1918), widely known as W. J. Murphy, was an American businessman principally associated with the Minneapolis Tribune as owner, publisher and editor from 1891 until his death in 1918. His bequest to the University of Minnesota helped create the journalism department now known as the University of Minnesota School of Journalism and Mass Communication.

== Early life ==
Born in Troy, St. Croix County, Wisconsin, to Irish immigrant homestead farmers James Murphy and Mary Ellen Murphy (née McGraw), W. J. Murphy was the second of eight surviving children, the oldest son, and the older brother to Frederick E. Murphy. He graduated from the University of Notre Dame with the class of 1878 and received his law degree from the University of Wisconsin in 1880.

== Career ==
W.J. Murphy opened his law practice in 1880 in Grand Forks, North Dakota. In 1882 he bought a fledgling local newspaper which had been offered for the price of the upcoming weekly payroll. Over the course of the next seven years, he turned the Grand Forks Plaindealer into a daily newspaper and a profitable operation. He sold the business in January of 1889 for $27,500 and was moving to Chicago when opportunity called in Minneapolis.

The Minneapolis Tribune had an uneven history in its early years, but W.J. Murphy closed a deal to buy the newspaper for $400,000 in March of 1891. He shortly thereafter bought out his partners and thus became the sole owner, publisher and editor for the remainder of his life. Under his leadership, the Tribune deployed modern printing techniques, achieved profitability, and became the dominant newspaper in the Northwest region.

== Personal life and death ==
Murphy married Josephine Hopkins of Chicago, Illinois, on July 26, 1886 in Chicago. They had four children.

Murphy died unexpectedly in Chicago of pneumonia at the age of 59 during the Spanish Flu outbreak. He was laid to rest adjacent to his parents in the Immaculate Conception Catholic Church Cemetery, New Richmond, Wisconsin.

== Legacy ==
W. J. Murphy's unexpected death twenty-seven years into his ownership left the newspaper in a management quandary, but his younger brother Frederick E. Murphy stepped into the publisher role in 1921 and manage all operations until his death in 1940. Soon thereafter the ownership of the Tribune was sold and the Murphy family reign that lasted nearly a half century was over.

The Minneapolis Tribune that eventually merged with the Minneapolis Daily Star under the name Minnesota Star Tribune and the ownership of the Cowles Media Company. As of 2023, it was the seventh largest newspaper by print circulation in the United States.

W.J. Murphy's will stipulated a majority of his estate be bequeathed to the University of Minnesota to help establish a journalism school. The "W.J. Murphy Endowment Fund for a School of Journalism" was a principal contributing factor leading to today's Hubbard School of Journalism and Mass Communication, and Murphy Hall, located on the campus of the University of Minnesota and opened in 1940, is named in honor of W.J. Murphy.
