= September 4 =

September 4 this year in various calendars
- Friday, 4 September 2026
Akan	Nkyifie
Armenian	16 Hoṙi 1476
Aztec	Atemoztli 17, 4 Cōātl
Babylonian	21 Abu, 2337 SE
Balinese pawukon	Menga, Kajeng, Jaya, Wage, Urukung, Sukra of Uye, Kala, Erangan, Pandita
Bengali	20 Bhadro, BS 1433
Chinese	Yin Metal Snake・Bond Mansion; Fire Horse Year, Month 7, Day 23 (Chushu, 3 days until Bailu)
Common Era	4 September 2026 CE
Coptic	29 Mesori, AM 1742
Egyptian	21 Tybi, 2775 NE
Ethiopian	29 Naḥasē, 2018 Amätä Məhrät
French Republican	Décade II, Octidi de Fructidor de l'Année 234 de la République
Gregorian	4 September, AD 2026
Hebrew	22 Elul, AM 5786
Hindu	Rohiṇi・Harṣaṇa; Solar: 19 Bhādrapada, 1948 SE; Lunisolar: Aṣṭamī, Kṛishna pakṣa of Śrāvaṇa, 2083 VE; Rāudra・5127 KY・1,872,822
Icelandic	Föstudagur, 11 Tvímánuður 2026
Islamic	21 Rabi' al-awwal, AH 1448 (using tabular method)
ISO week date	2026-W36-5
Japanese	23 Fumizuki, Reiwa 8 (Shosho, 3 days until Hakuro)
Julian	22 August, AD 2026 (AM 7534)
Julian day	2461288
Korean	23 Wonsungidal, 4359 DE
Maya	13.0.13.16.5; 18 Mol, 4 Chicchan
Roman	ante diem XI Kalendas Septembres, MMDCCLXXIX AUC
Solar Hijri	13 Shahrivar, SH 1405
Tibetan	23 gro bzhin, me pho rta 2153 or 1772 or 1000

<<	September					>>
Su	Mo	Tu	We	Th	Fr	Sa
		1	2	3	4	5
6	7	8	9	10	11	12
13	14	15	16	17	18	19
20	21	22	23	24	25	26
27	28	29	30
2026

September 4 in recent years
2026 (Friday)
2025 (Thursday)
2024 (Wednesday)
2023 (Monday)
2022 (Sunday)
2021 (Saturday)
2020 (Friday)
2019 (Wednesday)
2018 (Tuesday)
2017 (Monday)

September 4 is the 247th day of the year (248th in leap years) in the Gregorian calendar; 118 days remain until the end of the year.

== Events ==
=== Pre-1600 ===
- 476 – Romulus Augustulus is deposed when Odoacer proclaims himself "King of Italy", thus ending the Western Roman Empire.
- 626 – Li Shimin, posthumously known as Emperor Taizong of Tang, assumes the throne over the Tang dynasty of China.
- 929 – Battle of Lenzen: Slavic forces (the Redarii and the Obotrites) are defeated by a Saxon army near the fortified stronghold of Lenzen in Brandenburg.
- 1260 – The Sienese Ghibellines, supported by the forces of Manfred, King of Sicily, defeat the Florentine Guelphs at Montaperti.
- 1282 – Peter III of Aragon is proclaimed King of Sicily in Palermo.
- 1479 – The Treaty of Alcáçovas is signed by the Catholic Monarchs of Castile and Aragon on one side and Afonso V and his son, Prince John of Portugal.

=== 1601–1900 ===
- 1607 – The Flight of the Earls takes place in Ireland (14 September N.S.).
- 1666 – In London, England, the most destructive damage from the Great Fire occurs.
- 1746 – The Treaty of Kerden concludes the Ottoman–Persian War (1743–1746).
- 1774 – New Caledonia is first sighted by Europeans, during the second voyage of Captain James Cook.
- 1781 – Los Angeles is founded as El Pueblo de Nuestra Señora La Reina de los Ángeles (The Village of Our Lady, the Queen of the Angels) by 44 Spanish settlers.
- 1797 – Coup of 18 Fructidor in France.
- 1800 – The French garrison in Valletta surrenders to British troops who had been called at the invitation of the Maltese. The islands of Malta and Gozo become the Malta Protectorate.
- 1812 – War of 1812: The Siege of Fort Harrison begins when the fort is set on fire.
- 1813 – Future U.S. president Andrew Jackson is shot in a tavern brawl with future U.S. Senator Thomas Hart Benton and others.
- 1827 – The Great Fire of Turku almost completely destroys Finland's former capital city.
- 1839 – Battle of Kowloon: British vessels open fire on Chinese war junks enforcing a food sales embargo on the British community in China in the first armed conflict of the First Opium War.
- 1862 – American Civil War: The Maryland campaign begins as Confederate General Robert E. Lee leads the Army of Northern Virginia into Maryland, starting his first invasion of the North.
- 1864 – American Civil War: Confederate cavalry general John Hunt Morgan is ambushed and killed by Union troops during a surprise raid on Greeneville, Tennessee.
- 1870 – Emperor Napoleon III of France is deposed and the Third Republic is declared.
- 1882 – The Pearl Street Station in New York City becomes the first power plant to supply electricity to paying customers.
- 1886 – American Indian Wars: After almost 30 years of fighting, Apache leader Geronimo, with his remaining warriors, surrenders to General Nelson Miles in Arizona.
- 1888 – George Eastman registers the trademark Kodak and receives a patent for his camera that uses roll film.

=== 1901–present ===
- 1912 – Albanian rebels succeed in their revolt when the Ottoman Empire agrees to fulfill their demands
- 1914 – World War I: Start of the Battle of Grand Couronné, a German assault against French positions on high ground near the city of Nancy.
- 1919 – Mustafa Kemal Atatürk, who founded the Republic of Turkey, gathers a congress in Sivas to make decisions as to the future of Anatolia and Thrace.
- 1923 – Maiden flight of the first U.S. airship, the USS Shenandoah.
- 1936 – Spanish Civil War: Largo Caballero forms a war cabinet to direct the republican war effort.
- 1939 – World War II: William J. Murphy commands the first Royal Air Force attack on Germany.
- 1941 – World War II: A German submarine makes the first attack of the war against a United States warship, the USS Greer.
- 1944 – World War II: The British 11th Armoured Division liberates the Belgian city of Antwerp.
- 1944 – World War II: Finland exits from the war with Soviet Union.
- 1948 – Queen Wilhelmina of the Netherlands abdicates for health reasons.
- 1949 – Paul Robeson performs a second concert in Peekskill, New York eight days after the Peekskill riots.
- 1950 – Darlington Raceway is the site of the inaugural Southern 500, the first 500-mile NASCAR race.
- 1951 – The first live transcontinental television broadcast takes place in San Francisco, United States, from the Japanese Peace Treaty Conference.
- 1957 – American Civil Rights Movement: Little Rock Crisis: The governor of Arkansas calls out the National Guard to prevent African American students from enrolling in Little Rock Central High School, resulting in the lawsuit Cooper v. Aaron the following year.
- 1963 – Swissair Flight 306 crashes near Dürrenäsch, Switzerland, killing all 80 people on board.
- 1964 – Scotland's Forth Road Bridge near Edinburgh officially opens.
- 1967 – Vietnam War: Operation Swift begins when U.S. Marines engage the North Vietnamese in battle in the Que Son Valley.
- 1970 – Salvador Allende is elected President of Chile.
- 1971 – Alaska Airlines Flight 1866 crashes near Juneau, Alaska, killing all 111 people on board.
- 1972 – Mark Spitz becomes the first competitor to win seven medals at a single Olympic Games.
- 1972 – The Price Is Right premieres on CBS. It currently is the longest running game show on American television.
- 1975 – The Sinai Interim Agreement relating to the Arab–Israeli conflict is signed.
- 1977 – The Golden Dragon massacre takes place in San Francisco.
- 1985 – The discovery of Buckminsterfullerene, the first fullerene molecule of carbon.
- 1989 – In Leipzig, East Germany, the first of weekly demonstration for the legalisation of opposition groups and democratic reforms takes place.
- 1995 – The 1995 Okinawa rape occurs when 3 US servicemen abduct and rape a schoolchild. This would cause widespread protest against the US military presence on the prefecture.
- 1998 – Google is founded by Larry Page and Sergey Brin, two PhD students at Stanford University.
- 2001 – Tokyo DisneySea opens to the public as part of the Tokyo Disney Resort in Urayasu, Chiba, Japan.
- 2002 – The Oakland Athletics win their 20th consecutive game, an American League record, until the Cleveland Indians surpassed it in 2017.
- 2007 – Three terrorists suspected to be a part of Al-Qaeda are arrested in Germany after allegedly planning attacks on both the Frankfurt International airport and US military installations.
- 2020 – Pope Benedict XVI becomes the longest-lived pope, 93 years, four months, 16 days, surpassing Pope Leo XIII, who died in 1903.
- 2022 – Ten people are killed and 15 are injured in a stabbing spree in 13 locations on the James Smith Cree Nation and in Weldon, Saskatchewan.
- 2024 – A 14-year-old gunman kills four people and injures seven in a mass shooting at Apalachee High School near Winder, Georgia.

== Births ==
=== Pre-1600 ===
- 973 – Al-Biruni, Persian physician and polymath (died 1048)
- 1241 – Alexander III, king of Scotland (died 1286)
- 1383 – Felix V, antipope of Rome (died 1451)
- 1454 – Henry Stafford, 2nd Duke of Buckingham, English politician, Lord High Constable of England (died 1483)
- 1557 – Sophie of Mecklenburg-Güstrow, queen consort of Denmark and Norway (died 1631)
- 1563 – Wanli, Chinese emperor (died 1620)
- 1580 – George Percy, English explorer (died 1632)
- 1596 – Constantijn Huygens, Dutch poet and composer (died 1687)

=== 1601–1900 ===
- 1681 – Carl Heinrich Biber, Austrian violinist and composer (died 1749)
- 1717 – Job Orton, English minister and author (died 1783)
- 1745 – Shneur Zalman, Russian rabbi, author and founder of Chabad (died 1812)
- 1755 – Axel von Fersen the Younger, Swedish general and politician (died 1810)
- 1768 – François-René de Chateaubriand, French historian and politician, Minister of Foreign Affairs for France (died 1848)
- 1803 – Sarah Childress Polk, First Lady of the United States (died 1891)
- 1809 – Manuel Montt, Chilean scholar and politician, 6th President of Chile (died 1880)
- 1809 – Juliusz Słowacki, Polish poet and playwright (died 1849)
- 1810 – Donald McKay, Nova Scotia born naval architect (died 1880)
- 1824 – Anton Bruckner, Austrian organist and composer (died 1896)
- 1825 – Dadabhai Naoroji, Indian academic and politician, President of the Indian National Congress (died 1917)
- 1826 – Martin Wiberg, Swedish philosopher and engineer (died 1905)
- 1832 – Antonio Agliardi, Italian cardinal (died 1915)
- 1846 – Daniel Burnham, American architect, designed the World's Columbian Exposition (died 1912)
- 1877 – Kārlis Ulmanis, Latvian prime minister and president (died 1942)
- 1848 – Lewis Howard Latimer, American inventor (died 1928)
- 1850 – Luigi Cadorna, Italian field marshal (died 1928)
- 1851 – John Dillon, Irish poet and politician (died 1927)
- 1862 – Franjo Krežma, Croatian violinist and composer (died 1881)
- 1885 – Antonio Bacci, Italian cardinal (died 1971)
- 1886 – Albert Orsborn, English 6th General of The Salvation Army (died 1967)
- 1887 – Roy William Neill, Irish-English director, producer, and screenwriter (died 1946)
- 1888 – Oskar Schlemmer, German painter, sculptor, designer and choreographer (died 1943)
- 1890 – Gunnar Sommerfeldt, Danish actor, director, and screenwriter (died 1947)
- 1891 – Fritz Todt, German engineer, politician, and senior Nazi official (died 1942)
- 1892 – Darius Milhaud, French composer and educator (died 1974)
- 1894 – Daniel van der Meulen, Dutch diplomat (died 1989)
- 1896 – Antonin Artaud, French actor, director, and playwright (died 1948)

=== 1901–present ===
- 1901 – William Lyons, English businessman, co-founded Jaguar Cars (died 1985)
- 1905 – Mary Renault, English-South African author (died 1983)
- 1905 – Walter Zapp, Latvian-Estonian inventor, invented the Minox (died 2003)
- 1906 – Ruben Oskar Auervaara, Finnish fraudster (died 1964)
- 1906 – Max Delbrück, German-American biophysicist and academic, Nobel Prize laureate (died 1981)
- 1907 – Reggie Nalder, Austrian-American actor (died 1991)
- 1908 – Edward Dmytryk, Canadian-American director and producer (died 1999)
- 1908 – Richard Wright, American novelist, short story writer, essayist, and poet (died 1960)
- 1909 – Eduard Wirths, German physician (died 1945)
- 1910 – Denis Tomlinson, Zimbabwean-South African cricketer (died 1993)
- 1912 – Syd Hoff, American author and illustrator (died 2004)
- 1912 – Alexander Liberman, Russian-American publisher, painter, photographer, and sculptor (died 1999)
- 1913 – Mickey Cohen, American mob boss (died 1976)
- 1913 – Stanford Moore, American biochemist and academic, Nobel Prize laureate (died 1982)
- 1913 – Kenzō Tange, Japanese architect (died 2005)
- 1914 – Rudolf Leiding, German businessman (died 2003)
- 1917 – Henry Ford II, American businessman (died 1987)
- 1918 – Paul Harvey, American radio host (died 2009)
- 1918 – Gerald Wilson, American trumpet player and composer (died 2014)
- 1919 – Émile Bouchard, Canadian ice hockey player (died 2012)
- 1919 – Howard Morris, American actor, director, and screenwriter (died 2005)
- 1919 – Kurnianingrat, Indonesian educator (died 1993)
- 1920 – Konstantin Kalser, German-American film producer and advertising executive (died 1994)
- 1922 – Per Olof Sundman, Swedish author and politician (died 1992)
- 1923 – Ram Kishore Shukla, Indian lawyer and politician (died 2003)
- 1924 – Joan Aiken, English author (died 2004)
- 1924 – Justinas Lagunavičius, Lithuanian basketball player (died 1997)
- 1925 – Asa Earl Carter, American Ku Klux Klan leader and author (died 1979)
- 1926 – George William Gray, British chemist, developer of stable liquid crystals (died 2013)
- 1926 – Ivan Illich, Austrian priest and philosopher (died 2002)
- 1926 – Bert Olmstead, Canadian ice hockey player and coach (died 2015)
- 1927 – John McCarthy, American computer scientist and academic (died 2011)
- 1927 – Ferenc Sánta, Hungarian author and screenwriter (died 2008)
- 1928 – Dick York, American actor (died 1992)
- 1929 – Thomas Eagleton, American lawyer and politician, 38th Lieutenant Governor of Missouri (died 2007)
- 1930 – William Maxson, American general (died 2013)
- 1930 – Jerry Ragovoy, American songwriter ("Piece Of My Heart"; "Time Is On My Side"; "Pata Pata") (died 2011)
- 1931 – Mitzi Gaynor, American actress, singer, and dancer (died 2024)
- 1931 – Antonios Trakatellis, Greek biochemist and politician
- 1932 – Carlos Romero Barceló, Puerto Rican lawyer and politician, 5th Governor of Puerto Rico (died 2021)
- 1934 – Clive Granger, Welsh-American economist and academic, Nobel Prize laureate (died 2009)
- 1934 – Antoine Redin, French footballer and manager (died 2012)
- 1934 – Eduard Khil, Russian baritone singer (died 2012)
- 1934 – Jan Švankmajer, Czech filmmaker and artist
- 1936 – Kamuta Latasi, Tuvaluan politician, 4th Prime Minister of Tuvalu
- 1936 – Judea Pearl, computer scientist recognized for his pioneering work in the fields of AI and probabilistic reasoning
- 1937 – Dawn Fraser, Australian swimmer and politician
- 1939 – Denis Lindsay, South African cricketer and referee (died 2005)
- 1941 – Marilena de Souza Chaui, Brazilian philosopher and academic
- 1941 – Sushilkumar Shinde, Indian lawyer and politician, 19th Governor of Andhra Pradesh
- 1942 – Raymond Floyd, American golfer
- 1942 – Merald "Bubba" Knight, American singer
- 1944 – Tony Atkinson, English economist and academic (died 2017)
- 1944 – Gene Parsons, American singer-songwriter, drummer, guitarist, and banjo player
- 1944 – Jerry Relph, American politician and member of the Minnesota Senate (died 2020)
- 1944 – Jennifer Salt, American actress, screenwriter, and producer
- 1945 – Bill Kenwright, English actor, singer, and producer (died 2023)
- 1946 – Dave Liebman, American saxophonist, flute player, and composer
- 1949 – Darryl Cotton, Australian singer-songwriter and guitarist (died 2012)
- 1949 – Tom Watson, American golfer and sportscaster
- 1950 – Frank White, American baseball player and politician
- 1951 – Martin Chambers, English drummer and singer
- 1951 – Judith Ivey, American actress
- 1951 – Marita Ulvskog, Swedish politician, Deputy Prime Minister of Sweden
- 1953 – Janet Biehl, American philosopher and author
- 1953 – Fatih Terim, Turkish footballer and manager
- 1955 – Garth Le Roux, South African cricketer
- 1955 – Brian Schweitzer, American politician, 23rd Governor of Montana
- 1956 – Blackie Lawless, American singer-songwriter and guitarist
- 1957 – Khandi Alexander, American actress, dancer, and choreographer
- 1958 – Jacqueline Hewitt, American astrophysicist and astronomer
- 1958 – Marzio Innocenti, Italian rugby player and coach
- 1958 – Drew Pinsky, American radio and television host
- 1959 – Armin Kogler, Austrian ski jumper
- 1960 – Kim Thayil, American guitarist and songwriter
- 1960 – Shailesh Vara, Ugandan-English lawyer and politician
- 1960 – Damon Wayans, American actor, director, producer, and screenwriter
- 1961 – Lars Jönsson, Swedish film producer
- 1962 – Kiran More, Indian cricketer
- 1962 – Ulla Tørnæs, Danish politician, Danish Minister of Education
- 1962 – Shinya Yamanaka, Japanese physician and biologist, Nobel Prize laureate
- 1963 – John Vanbiesbrouck, American ice hockey player, coach, and manager
- 1964 – Tomas Sandström, Finnish-Swedish ice hockey player
- 1964 – Aadesh Shrivastava, Indian singer-songwriter (died 2015)
- 1965 – Sergio Momesso, Canadian ice hockey player and sportscaster
- 1966 – Yanka Dyagileva, Russian singer-songwriter (died 1991)
- 1966 – Biréli Lagrène, French jazz guitarist
- 1966 – Jeff Tremaine, American director, producer, and screenwriter
- 1967 – Darrin Murray, New Zealand cricketer and accountant
- 1967 – Dezső Szabó, Hungarian decathlete
- 1968 – Fernando Rojas, Colombian-American producer
- 1968 – John DiMaggio, American voice actor
- 1968 – Mike Piazza, American baseball player
- 1969 – Sasha, Welsh DJ and producer
- 1969 – Ramon Dekkers, Dutch kick-boxer and mixed martial artist (died 2013)
- 1969 – Giorgi Margvelashvili, Georgian academic and politician, 4th President of Georgia
- 1969 – Richard Speight Jr., American actor and director
- 1969 – Noah Taylor, Australian actor
- 1969 – Inga Tuigamala, Samoan-New Zealand rugby player
- 1970 – Igor Cavalera, Brazilian drummer
- 1970 – Deni Hines, Australian singer-songwriter
- 1970 – Ivan Iusco, Italian composer
- 1970 – Sven Meyer, German footballer
- 1970 – Ione Skye, English-American actress
- 1971 – Craig Conroy, American ice hockey player and executive
- 1971 – Lance Klusener, South African cricketer and coach
- 1971 – Maik Taylor, German-Irish footballer and coach
- 1972 – Steve Leonard, Northern Irish veterinarian and television personality
- 1973 – Jason David Frank, American actor and mixed martial artist (died 2022)
- 1972 – Carlos Ponce, Puerto-Rican entertainer
- 1974 – Mati Pari, Estonian footballer and coach
- 1974 – Lincoln Roberts, Tobagonian cricketer
- 1975 – Sergio Ballesteros, Spanish footballer
- 1975 – Mark Ronson, English DJ, producer, and songwriter, co-founded Allido Records
- 1976 – Denilson Martins Nascimento, Brazilian footballer
- 1976 – Mario-Ernesto Rodríguez, Uruguayan-Italian footballer
- 1977 – Sun-woo Kim, South Korean baseball player
- 1977 – Lucie Silvas, English singer-songwriter and pianist
- 1977 – Awesome Kong (Kia Stevens), American wrestler
- 1978 – Wes Bentley, American actor and producer
- 1978 – Frederik Veuchelen, Belgian cyclist
- 1978 – Christian Walz, Swedish singer-songwriter and producer
- 1979 – Maxim Afinogenov, Russian ice hockey player
- 1979 – Pedro Macedo Camacho, Portuguese pianist, composer, and producer
- 1979 – Max Greenfield, American actor
- 1981 – Beyoncé, American singer-songwriter
- 1981 – Richard Garcia, Australian footballer
- 1981 – Lacey Sturm, American singer-songwriter
- 1982 – Whitney Cummings, American comedian, actress, producer, and screenwriter
- 1983 – Yuichi Nakamaru, Japanese singer-songwriter, actor, and radio host
- 1983 – Guy Pnini, Israeli basketball player
- 1983 – Margit Rüütel, Estonian tennis player
- 1984 – Hamish McIntosh, Australian footballer
- 1984 – Kyle Mooney, American comedian, actor, and screenwriter
- 1985 – Raúl Albiol, Spanish footballer
- 1985 – Walid Mesloub, Algerian footballer
- 1986 – Ayumi Kaihori, Japanese footballer
- 1986 – Xavier Woods, American wrestler
- 1987 – Wesley Blake, American wrestler
- 1987 – Marisa Kabas, American journalist
- 1988 – Adam Duvall, American baseball player
- 1988 – JJ Hickson, American basketball player
- 1989 – Andrelton Simmons, Curaçaoan baseball player
- 1990 – James Bay, English singer-songwriter and guitarist
- 1991 – Adrien Bart, French sprint canoeist
- 1991 – Anders Zachariassen, Danish handball player
- 1992 – Zerkaa, English YouTuber
- 1993 – Emma Brownlie, Scottish footballer
- 1993 – Yannick Carrasco, Belgian footballer
- 1993 – Mark Tuan, American rapper
- 1994 – Kenny McEvoy, Irish footballer
- 1994 – Sabina Sharipova, Uzbekistan tennis player
- 1995 – Jazz Tevaga, New Zealand rugby league player
- 1996 – Ashton Golding, English rugby league player
- 1998 – Neru Nagahama, Japanese television personality
- 2000 – Sergio Gómez, Spanish footballer
- 2001 – Talitha Bateman, American actress

== Deaths ==
=== Pre-1600 ===
- 422 – Boniface I, pope of the Catholic Church
- 799 – Musa al-Kadhim, Arabic imam (born 745)
- 1037 – Bermudo III, king of León (born c. 1017)
- 1063 – Tughril, Seljuq sultan (born 990)
- 1199 – Joan of England, queen of Sicily (born 1165)
- 1308 – Margaret of Burgundy, queen of Sicily (born 1250)
- 1323 – Gegeen Khan, Chinese emperor (born 1302)
- 1332 – García de Ayerbe, Spanish bishop and crusade theorist
- 1416 – John I, Count of Nassau-Siegen, German count
- 1417 – Robert Hallam, English Catholic bishop
- 1537 – Johann Dietenberger, German theologian and translator (born 1475)
- 1571 – Matthew Stewart, 4th Earl of Lennox, English nobleman (born 1516)
- 1588 – Robert Dudley, 1st Earl of Leicester, English academic and politician, Lord Lieutenant of Norfolk (born 1532)

=== 1601–1900 ===
- 1625 – Thomas Smythe, English diplomat (born 1558)
- 1676 – John Ogilby, Scottish-born impresario and cartographer (born 1600)
- 1767 – Charles Townshend, English politician, Chancellor of the Exchequer (born 1725)
- 1780 – John Fielding, English lawyer and judge (born 1721)
- 1784 – César-François Cassini de Thury, French astronomer and cartographer (born 1714)
- 1794 – John Hely-Hutchinson, Anglo-Irish lawyer and politician (born 1724)
- 1804 – Richard Somers, American lieutenant (born 1778)
- 1820 – Timothy Brown, English banker and merchant (born 1743/4)
- 1821 – José Miguel Carrera, Chilean general and politician (born 1785)
- 1849 – Friedrich Laun, German author (born 1770)
- 1852 – William MacGillivray, Scottish biologist and ornithologist (born 1796)
- 1864 – John Hunt Morgan, American general (born 1825)

=== 1901–present ===
- 1907 – Edvard Grieg, Norwegian pianist and composer (born 1843)
- 1909 – Clyde Fitch, American playwright and songwriter (born 1865)
- 1911 – John Francon Williams, Welsh-born writer, journalist, geographer, historian, cartographer and inventor (born 1854)
- 1914 – Charles Péguy, French poet and philosopher (born 1873)
- 1923 – Howdy Wilcox, American racing driver (born 1889)
- 1940 – George William de Carteret, French-English journalist and author (born 1869)
- 1944 – Erich Fellgiebel, German general (born 1886)
- 1963 – Robert Schuman, Luxembourgian-French politician, 130th Prime Minister of France (born 1886)
- 1965 – Albert Schweitzer, French-Gabonese physician, theologian, and missionary, Nobel Prize laureate (born 1875)
- 1974 – Creighton Abrams, American general (born 1914)
- 1974 – Marcel Achard, French playwright and screenwriter (born 1899)
- 1974 – Charles Arnison, English airman (born 1893)
- 1974 – Lewi Pethrus, Swedish minister and hymn-writer (born 1884)
- 1977 – Stelios Perpiniadis, Greek singer-songwriter and guitarist (born 1899)
- 1977 – Jean Rostand, French biologist and philosopher (born 1894)
- 1977 – E. F. Schumacher, German-English economist and statistician (born 1911)
- 1982 – Jack Tworkov, Polish-American painter (born 1900)
- 1983 – Jon Brower Minnoch, famous for being the world's heaviest person recorded (born 1941)
- 1985 – Vasyl Stus, Ukrainian poet, publicist, and dissident (born 1938)
- 1985 – George O'Brien, American actor and singer (born 1899)
- 1986 – Otto Glória, Brazilian footballer and manager (born 1917)
- 1986 – Hank Greenberg, American baseball player and manager (born 1911)
- 1987 – Bill Bowes, English cricketer and coach (born 1908)
- 1989 – Georges Simenon, Belgian-Swiss author (born 1903)
- 1989 – Ronald Syme, New Zealand historian and author (born 1903)
- 1990 – Lawrence A. Cremin, American historian and author (born 1925)
- 1990 – Irene Dunne, American actress and singer (born 1898)
- 1990 – Turan Dursun, Turkish scholar and author (born 1934)
- 1991 – Charlie Barnet, American saxophonist, composer, and bandleader (born 1913)
- 1991 – Tom Tryon, American actor and author (born 1926)
- 1991 – Dottie West, American singer-songwriter and actress (born 1932)
- 1993 – Hervé Villechaize, French-American actor (born 1943)
- 1995 – Chuck Greenberg, American saxophonist, composer, and producer (born 1950)
- 1995 – William Kunstler, American lawyer and activist (born 1919)
- 1996 – Joan Clarke, English cryptanalyst and numismatist (born 1917)
- 1996 – Rose Ouellette, Canadian actress and manager (born 1903)
- 1997 – Dharamvir Bharati, Indian author, poet, and playwright (born 1926)
- 1997 – Aldo Rossi, Italian architect, designed the Bonnefanten Museum and Teatro Carlo Felice (born 1931)
- 1998 – Ernst Jaakson, Estonian diplomat (born 1905)
- 1998 – Elizabeth Kata, Australian author and screenwriter (born 1912)
- 1999 – Georg Gawliczek, German footballer and manager (born 1919)
- 2002 – Vlado Perlemuter, Lithuanian-French pianist and educator (born 1904)
- 2003 – Lola Bobesco, Romanian-Belgian violinist and educator (born 1921)
- 2003 – Tibor Varga, Hungarian violinist and conductor (born 1921)
- 2004 – Alphonso Ford, American basketball player (born 1971)
- 2004 – Moe Norman, Canadian golfer (born 1929)
- 2006 – Giacinto Facchetti, Italian footballer and manager (born 1942)
- 2006 – Steve Irwin, Australian zoologist and television host (born 1962)
- 2006 – Colin Thiele, Australian author, poet, and educator (born 1920)
- 2006 – Astrid Varnay, Swedish-American soprano (born 1918)
- 2007 – John Scott, 9th Duke of Buccleuch, Scottish soldier and politician, Lord Lieutenant of Roxburghshire (born 1923)
- 2010 – Bonnie Leman, American art historian, writer, and publisher of Quilter's Newsletter Magazine (born 1926)
- 2011 – Lee Roy Selmon, American football player (born 1954)
- 2012 – Abraham Avigdorov, Israeli soldier (born 1929)
- 2012 – Albert Marre, American actor, director, and producer (born 1924)
- 2012 – George Savitsky, American football player (born 1924)
- 2012 – Syed Mustafa Siraj, Indian author (born 1930)
- 2012 – Hakam Sufi, Indian singer-songwriter (born 1952)
- 2013 – Michel Pagé, Canadian businessman and politician (born 1949)
- 2013 – Dick Raaymakers, Dutch composer and theorist (born 1930)
- 2013 – Daniele Seccarecci, Italian bodybuilder (born 1980)
- 2013 – Stanislav Stepashkin, Russian boxer (born 1940)
- 2013 – Casey Viator, American bodybuilder and journalist (born 1951)
- 2014 – Ron Mulock, Australian lawyer and politician, 10th Deputy Premier of New South Wales (born 1930)
- 2014 – Gustavo Cerati, Argentine Musician (born 1959)
- 2014 – Wolfhart Pannenberg, Polish-German theologian and academic (born 1928)
- 2014 – Joan Rivers, American comedian, television host, and author (born 1933)
- 2015 – Graham Brazier, New Zealand singer-songwriter (born 1952)
- 2015 – Jean Darling, American actress (born 1922)
- 2015 – Wilfred de Souza, Indian surgeon and politician, 7th Chief Minister of Goa (born 1927)
- 2015 – Warren Murphy, American author and screenwriter (born 1933)
- 2016 – Clarence D. Rappleyea Jr., lawyer and politician (born 1933)
- 2018 – Bill Daily, American actor, comedian (born 1927)
- 2018 – Krzysztof Sitko, Polish association football player (born 1967)
- 2020 – Lloyd Cadena, Filipino YouTuber and vlogger (born 1993)
- 2021 – Tunch Ilkin, Turkish-American football player (born 1957)
- 2021 – Willard Scott, American weather presenter and television personality (born 1934)
- 2022 – Cyrus Mistry, Indian-Irish businessman (born 1968)
- 2022 – Peter Straub, American novelist (born 1943)
- 2023 – Steve Harwell, American singer (born 1967)
- 2024 – Bora Đorđević, Serbian singer (born 1952)
- 2025 – Giorgio Armani, Italian fashion designer (born 1934)
- 2025 – Katharine, Duchess of Kent, member of the British royal family (born 1933)

== Holidays and observances ==
- Christian feast day:
  - Candida the Elder
  - Blessed Catherine of Racconigi
  - Blessed Dina Bélanger
  - Hermione of Ephesus
  - Ida of Herzfeld
  - Irmgardis (of Süchteln)
  - Moses and Aaron (Catholic, Lutheran Church and Eastern Orthodox Church)
  - Paul Jones (Episcopal Church)
  - Rosalia
  - Rose of Viterbo
  - Rufinus, Silvanus, and Vitalicus
  - Thamel and companions
  - Ultan of Ardbraccan
  - September 4 (Eastern Orthodox liturgics)
- Immigrant's Day (Argentina)
- Toothfish Day (South Georgia and the South Sandwich Islands)
