= University of Minnesota School of Journalism and Mass Communication =

Journalism school at the University of Minnesota

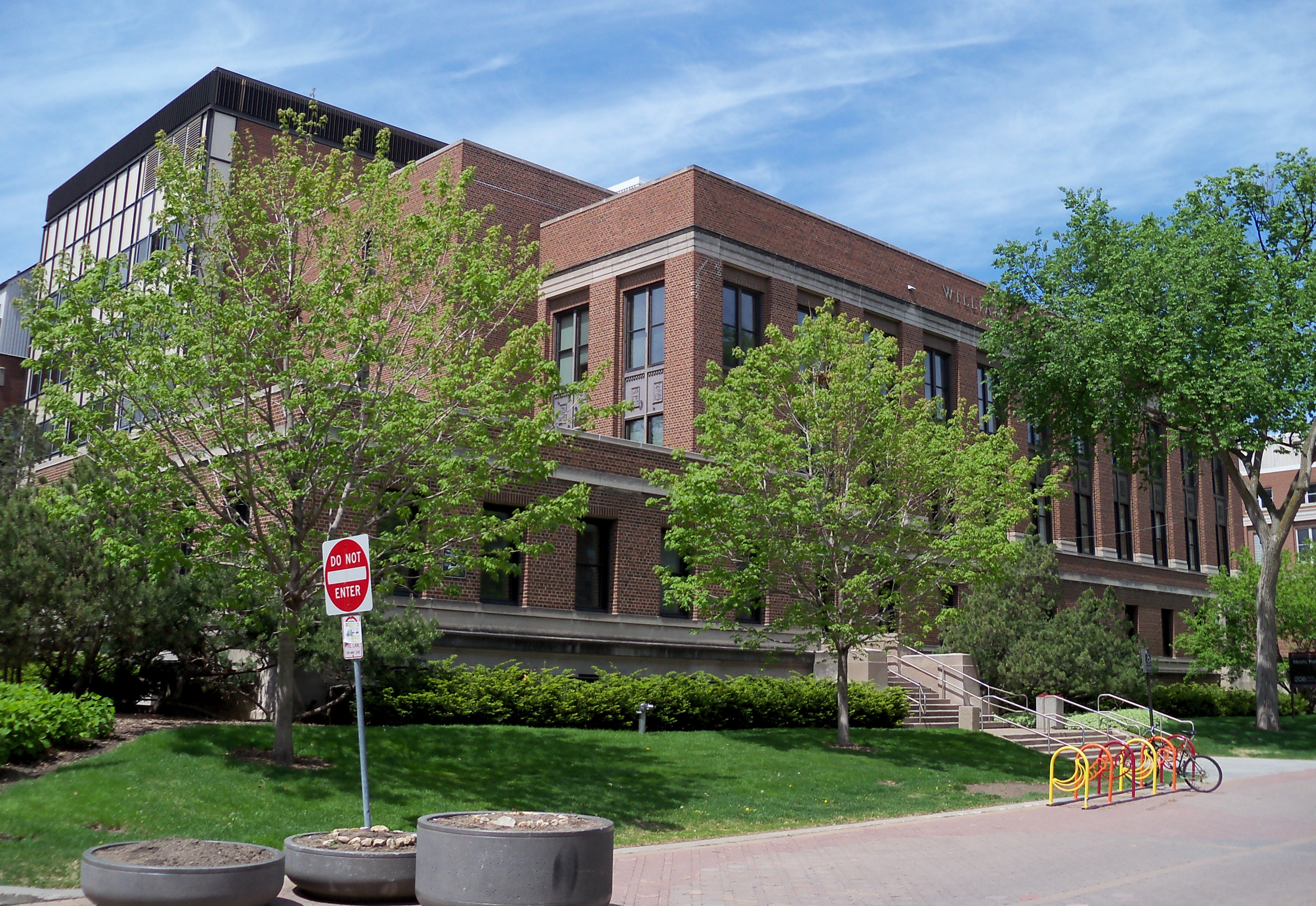
Murphy Hall at the University of Minnesota in Minneapolis, Minnesota

The Hubbard School of Journalism and Mass Communication is a journalism school at the University of Minnesota that offers programs in journalism, strategic communication and mass communication. It is located on the Minneapolis campus. It houses around 800 undergraduates and more than 30 graduate students in a given academic year.

The Hubbard School offers three undergraduate majors: journalism, strategic communication and mass communication. The graduate program features M.A. degrees in mass communication and professional strategic communication. A Ph.D. in mass communication is also offered. The school has more than 30 faculty members, including professors, associate professors, assistant professors and lecturers. There were also many adjunct instructors who teach each academic year, many of whom have journalistic experience in the Twin Cities market.

== Accreditation ==
The School is accredited by the Accrediting Council for Journalism and Mass Communication (ACEJMC). It is also part of the University of Minnesota College of Liberal Arts. Was one of the first 35 schools to be accredited by the American Council on Education for Journalism in 1948.

== Director ==
Elisia Cohen is the current director of the Hubbard School of Journalism and Mass Communication. She was appointed in 2017.

== Murphy Hall ==
Murphy Hall opened in 1940 and has been used to house the University of Minnesota's Hubbard School of Journalism and Mass Communication (HSJMC) since that time. The building, which cost $250,000 to build, was funded largely through a fund bequeathed by William J. Murphy. Journalism, advertising and public relations courses are currently taught in the hall at the undergraduate, graduate and doctorate levels. The building features a journalism lab and library. It is located at 206 Church St. SE, Minneapolis, MN 55455 on the Northrop Mall area of the University of Minnesota's East Bank campus.

U of M Hubbard School of Journalism and Mass Communication	Murphy Hall
Founded: 1922	Built: 1940
Enrollment: Approx. 1,085 undergrad, 75 grad	Size: 27,000 sg. ft, five floors
Courses: Journalism, strategic communication: advertising and public relations, media and information	Cost to build: $250,000
Director: Elisia L. Cohen	Named for: William J. Murphy, former publisher of the Minneapolis Tribune

=== Original building ===
Classes were first held in Murphy Hall during the winter quarter of 1940. The original building had four floors, housed multiple laboratories and was the home of the Minnesota Daily, the Ski-U-Mah, the Gopher and the Literary Review. The chairman of the department at the time was Ralph D. Casey, who served in that capacity for over 30 years. The journalism department itself was founded on campus in 1922 but was housed in various locations across campus, including Folwell and Pillsbury Halls and the old Music Building. Before becoming an official department, journalism classes were offered occasionally on the St. Paul campus through the agriculture school. Floor plans for the original Murphy Hall called for advertising, radio, typography, editing and reporting laboratories, as well as an auditorium, a seminar room and a museum. Plans to connect to nearby Vincent Hall were also laid out. William Murphy, a former publisher of the Star Tribune newspaper, left an interest-collecting fund for the soon-to-be-established department in 1918, citing a desire toward “the establishing and maintaining of a course of instruction in journalism.” Twenty-two years later, the gift paid for 55 percent of construction costs. The remaining funds came from a grant and student publications.

=== 1999 renovation ===
Murphy Hall underwent its first substantial update at the end of the 20th century, when most of the building's interior was gutted and renovated. The $9.25 million project started in 1999 and was completed in April 2001. A new auditorium, conference center and library were added, as were new classrooms and a broadcast studio. Mark Yudof, the University president at the time, said the renovation was, "...a jumping off point for new directions and innovations. It is all very exciting. It's catapulted the journalism school back to greatness..." The original stairwells, which featured opaque glass block windows, were retained, as was the Heggen Room, which had previously served as the school's library. The exterior of the building was also left intact. Students were able to take journalism classes during the two-year renovation but were moved to nearby classrooms.

=== Modern building ===
Murphy Hall today is 27,000 square feet (2,500 m^{2}) in total, encompassing five floors. The redesigned basement now features the Eric Sevareid Library, named after the former CBS broadcast journalist and SJMC alum (B.A. 1935), and a digital resource lab. The library features a selection of magazines and newspapers from across the country, trade-related journals and books, study areas and eight computers for student use. The lab has 52 computers for student use, video equipment for checkout and a recording studio, as well as areas for lectures. On the first floor, there is a 148-seat auditorium and various offices, including the student services office. The second and third floors house classrooms, faculty offices and areas for research. The fourth floor is home to the Silha Center for the Study of Media Ethics and Law, named after SJMC alum Otto Silha (B.A. 1940). The center, which has been around since 1984, is directed by Jane Kirtley. As planned for in 1939, Murphy Hall connects with Vincent Hall, the nearby math building, via multiple skyways and a tunnel. Between the two buildings and underneath part of the walkway is a courtyard, which features seating and a small fountain. As of 2007, the Minnesota Daily, one of the nation's largest student-run newspapers and the fourth-largest paper in Minnesota, no longer has an office in Murphy Hall, though many of its employees take journalism classes in the building.

== Notable alumni ==
The SJMC has roughly 8,300 living alumni. Among the notable alumni, both alive and deceased, are:

- Roy Wilkins (B.A. 1923) – Was the executive director of the National Association for the Advancement of Colored People (NAACP) and was involved with civil rights movements such as the 1963 March on Washington. Has the Roy Wilkins Auditorium named after him in St. Paul.
- Jim Klobuchar (B.A. 1950) – Star Tribune columnist for 30 years. Also contributes to the Christian Science Monitor. Father of Minnesota Senator Amy Klobuchar.
- Harry Reasoner (B.A. conferred 1989) – Worked for the Minneapolis Times beginning in 1942. From 1963-1970, he anchored the CBS News Sunday and, in 1968, he helped create the 60 Minutes program.
- Carl Rowan (B.A. 1948) – First black columnist to be published in major newspapers. Also authored books on the lives of Martin Luther King Jr. and Justice Thurgood Marshall. Served as deputy Secretary of State in the John F. Kennedy administration.
- Harrison Salisbury (B.A. 1930) – War correspondent for the New York Times during the Vietnam War. Cited as the first mainstream journalist to oppose the war.
- Michele Norris (B.A. 1985) – The co-host of National Public Radio's All Things Considered. Previously worked as an ABC TV news correspondent.
- Eric Sevareid (B.A. 1935) – Worked with Edward R. Murrow on CBS radio and became known as one of "Murrow's Boys" before moving onto a career in television.

== See also ==
- Minnesota Daily
