= Femco Farms =

- Femco Farm No. 2
- U.S. National Register of Historic Places
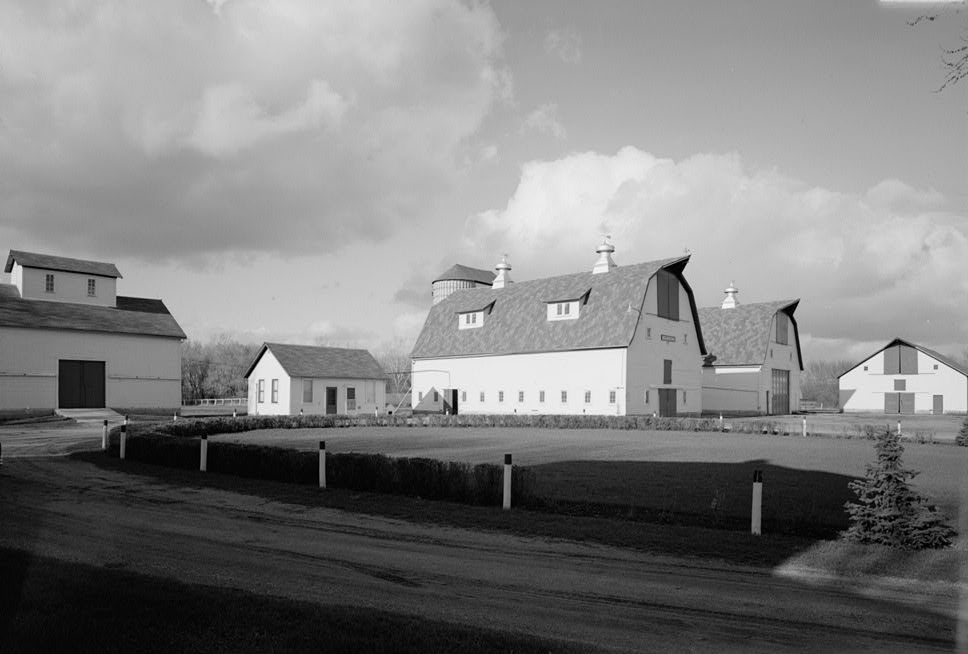
- Femco Farm No. 2 viewed from the southwest in 1990

- Location within Minnesota Location within the United States
- Location: County Road 153, Roberts Township, Minnesota
- Nearest city: Kent, Minnesota
- Coordinates: 46°27′27″N 96°39′35″W
- Area: 7 acres (2.8 ha)
- Built: 1922
- Architectural style: No style
- MPS: Wilkin County MRA
- NRHP reference No.: 80002184
- Added to NRHP: July 17, 1980

The Femco Farms consisted of five farm properties established in Wilkin County, Minnesota, United States, in the 1920s and 1930s to experiment with livestock breeding and agricultural diversification. They were created by Frederick E. Murphy, publisher of the Minneapolis Tribune newspaper, to demonstrate improved techniques like crop rotation that could benefit farmers. The Femco Farms became famous for their influential practices, and especially for their incredibly productive dairy cows. The best preserved of the five properties, Femco Farm No. 2, was listed on the National Register of Historic Places in 1980 for its local significance in the area of agriculture.

== History ==
Ordered by his doctor in 1918 to spend more time outdoors to combat frail health, newspaper publisher Frederick E. Murphy moved from Minneapolis to his wife's family farm in Wilkin County. He had long dreamed of experimenting with improved agricultural techniques, and began buying farm properties in the area. Soon Murphy had amassed five farms around Wilkin County, totaling about 5,000 acres (2,000 ha). The name he gave them, "Femco", was based on his initials.

The Femco Farms grew oats, barley, corn, alfalfa, sweet clover, rye, and flax. More importantly, Murphy invested exclusively in purebred livestock, namely Percheron horses, Duroc Jersey hogs, McKarrow Shropshire sheep, white Orpington chickens, and Holstein dairy cows. The farms experimented with stock raising, crop rotation, and soil fertilization, and promoted diversified farming—rather than the usual focus on a few cash crops—as the solution to many of the agricultural challenges of the day.

However the Femco Farms were particularly famous for their dairy cows, winning numerous awards. One Holstein cow, Lady Pride, was showcased at the 1932 Minnesota State Fair. At the time she produced more butter than any other cow, yielding 35,626 pounds (16,160 kg) of milk and 1,483 pounds (673 kg) of butter in one year; at the time, the average cow yielded 4,000 pounds (1,800 kg) of milk and 170 pounds (77 kg) of butter. Another Holstein, Daisy Aaggie Ormsby III, produced 1,607 pounds (729 kg) of butter over the course of a year, a new record. Murphy claimed that the yields his animals achieved could be reproduced by typical farmers using his techniques.

Murphy became president of the Minneapolis Tribune in 1921 and moved back to Minneapolis. After his death in 1940, the Femco Farm properties were auctioned off to separate owners. His award-winning dairy herds were sold as well, with some cows fetching $4,000 each (equivalent to $91,924 in 2025).

== Location ==
The original Femco Farm No. 1 is located five miles (8 km) north of Breckenridge, Minnesota. Though its structures are quite dilapidated, it is readily visible from U.S. Route 75. Femco Farm No. 2 is in Roberts Township just north of Kent. Farm No. 3 was in Mitchell Township, No. 4 was located just north of No. 1, and No. 5 was in Manston Township. A sixth property known as Femco No Number, at which the farms' manager lived, was one mile north of Breckenridge.

== Femco Farm No. 2 ==
Femco Farm No. 2 totaled 1,200 acres (490 ha). It was established in 1922, and 12 structures were built that year or shortly after. Still extant at the time of the property's National Register nomination in 1979 were the foreman and workers' house, a granary, milk house, dairy barn, silo, hog barn, sheep barn, horse barn, and machine shed. Three original structures—a chicken coop, windmill, and guest house for Murphy—had been demolished. The dairy barn is particularly distinctive, consisting of two large gambrel-roofed wings joined by a connecting hallway with its own gambrel roof.

Femco Farm No. 2 was nominated to the National Register of Historic Places as the best preserved of the five Femco Farms, which "had a lasting impact on the agricultural history of Wilkin County—and through its breeding stock, on U.S. agriculture."

== See also ==
- National Register of Historic Places listings in Wilkin County, Minnesota
