= Ski-U-Mah =

Ski-U-Mah may refer to:

- Ski-U-Mah (magazine)
- Ski-U-Mah (slogan)
