= Roberts Township, Wilkin County, Minnesota =

Roberts Township, Minnesota
- Township
- Location of Roberts Township, within Wilkin County, Minnesota

- Location within the state of Minnesota Roberts Township, Minnesota (the United States)
- Coordinates: 46°30′25″N 96°42′24″W
- Country: United States
- State: Minnesota
- County: Wilkin

Area
  - Total: 22.3 sq mi (57.7 km^{2})
  - Land: 22.3 sq mi (57.7 km^{2})
  - Water: 0 sq mi (0.0 km^{2})
- Elevation: 945 ft (288 m)

Population (2020)
  - Total: 100
  - Density: 4.5/sq mi (1.7/km^{2})
- Time zone: UTC-6 (Central (CST))
  - Summer (DST): UTC-5 (CDT)
- FIPS code: 27-54826
- GNIS feature ID: 0665429

Roberts Township is a township in Wilkin County, Minnesota, United States. The population was 100 at the 2020 census.

Roberts Township was named for Michel Roberts, an early French settler.

== Geography ==
According to the United States Census Bureau, the township has a total area of 22.3 square miles (57.7 km^{2}), all land. The township contains one property listed on the National Register of Historic Places, the 1922 Femco Farm No. 2.

== Demographics ==
As of the census of 2000, there were 118 people, 44 households, and 34 families residing in the township. The population density was 5.3 people per square mile (2.0/km^{2}). There were 47 housing units at an average density of 2.1/sq mi (0.8/km^{2}). The racial makeup of the township was 100.00% White.

There were 44 households, out of which 40.9% had children under the age of 18 living with them, 68.2% were married couples living together, 2.3% had a female householder with no husband present, and 22.7% were non-families. 18.2% of all households were made up of individuals, and 11.4% had someone living alone who was 65 years of age or older. The average household size was 2.68 and the average family size was 3.09.

In the township the population was spread out, with 28.8% under the age of 18, 3.4% from 18 to 24, 35.6% from 25 to 44, 20.3% from 45 to 64, and 11.9% who were 65 years of age or older. The median age was 36 years. For every 100 females, there were 103.4 males. For every 100 females age 18 and over, there were 115.4 males.

The median income for a household in the township was $35,625, and the median income for a family was $39,167. Males had a median income of $24,375 versus $21,250 for females. The per capita income for the township was $11,909. There were 6.3% of families and 8.4% of the population living below the poverty line, including 9.8% of under eighteens and none of those over 64.
