= Willie Murphy =

Willie Murphy may refer to:

- Willie Murphy (Cork hurler) (1915–1977), Irish hurler for Ballincollig and Cork, 1939–1949
- Willie Murphy (Kilkenny hurler) (fl. 1960s/1970s), Irish hurler for Rower-Inistioge and Kilkenny
- Willie Murphy (Wexford hurler) (born 1944), Irish hurler for Faythe Harriers and Wexford, 1965–1979
- Willie Murphy (baseball) (1864–?), baseball player
- Willie Murphy (musician) (1943–2019), American musician
- Willy Murphy (1937–1976), American underground cartoonist

== See also ==
- William Murphy (disambiguation)
