= William Patrick Murphy =

- Born: Memphis, Tennessee, U.S.
- Died: 29 September 2007

Academic background
- Education: Yale University

Academic work
- Discipline: Constitutional law
- Institutions: University of Mississippi

William Patrick Murphy (1920–2007) was a professor and author on the subject of Constitutional law from Memphis, Tennessee, who taught at the University of Mississippi for a term of eight years. He was an outspoken proponent of the Supreme Court's decision in Brown v. Board of Education, outlawing racial segregation in public schools.

== Background ==
Murphy was born on September 30, 1919, in Memphis, Tennessee, where he was raised. He earned his B.A. at Southwestern College. In 1941 Murphy was drafted into the U.S. Army, but he applied for and was accepted as an officer candidate in the U.S. Navy, where he served on several naval vessels during World War II. After his military service he attended the University of Virginia and received a Bachelor of Laws degree, after which he earned a Doctorate of Judicial Science from Yale University. In 1953 he joined the University of Mississippi (Ole Miss) faculty and began teaching constitutional law. Later in his career he also taught at University of Kentucky College of Law, and eventually University of North Carolina School of Law.

Murphy's political view held that the national government had superiority over state governments. Often at the center of partisan controversy, Murphy regarded those who held that the states had a right to secede from the Union as those who harbored Communist sympathies. He supported the Supreme Court's decision against racial segregation in public schools. For his strong stance over this view he was fired by Governor Ross Barnett, and others of his political persuasion, all of whom supported racial segregation.

Murphy was a member of the ACLU. In 1960 when the state college board refused to renew his teaching contract, Murphy claimed that it was over his membership in the ACLU. Rather than fight with the Mississippi college board, he resigned from the law school.

During his teaching sessions Murphy argued against the belief that the doctrine of State's rights allowed Mississippi to disregard the Supreme Court's decision in Brown v. Board of Education which is said to have been based on Constitutional principles.

Murphy died on September 29, 2007, at the age of 87.

== Works ==
- Murphy, William Patrick (1967). The Triumph of Nationalism: State Sovereignty, the Founding Fathers, and the Making of the Constitution. Quadrangle Books.

== Sources ==
- Murphy, William Patrick (1967). The Triumph of Nationalism: State Sovereignty, the Founding Fathers, and the Making of the Constitution. Quadrangle Books.
- "William Patrick Murphy 1920-2007". The Journal of Blacks in Higher Education (58). The JBHE Foundation, Inc. Winter 2007–2008. JSTOR 25073806.
- "The Triumph of Nationalism: State Sovereignty, The Founding Fathers, and the Making of the Constitution". Oxford University Press; American Historical review. 2023.
- The Triumph of Nationalism: State Sovereignty, the Founding Fathers. Oxford University Press: The Journal of American History.
- "Murphy, William P. (William Patrick), 1919-2007". The University of Georgia Libraries. 2023.
- "William P. Murphy". Kathrine R. Everett Law Library: Carolina Law Oral History Project. 2023.
