= Jim Klobuchar =

American journalist and author (1928–2021)

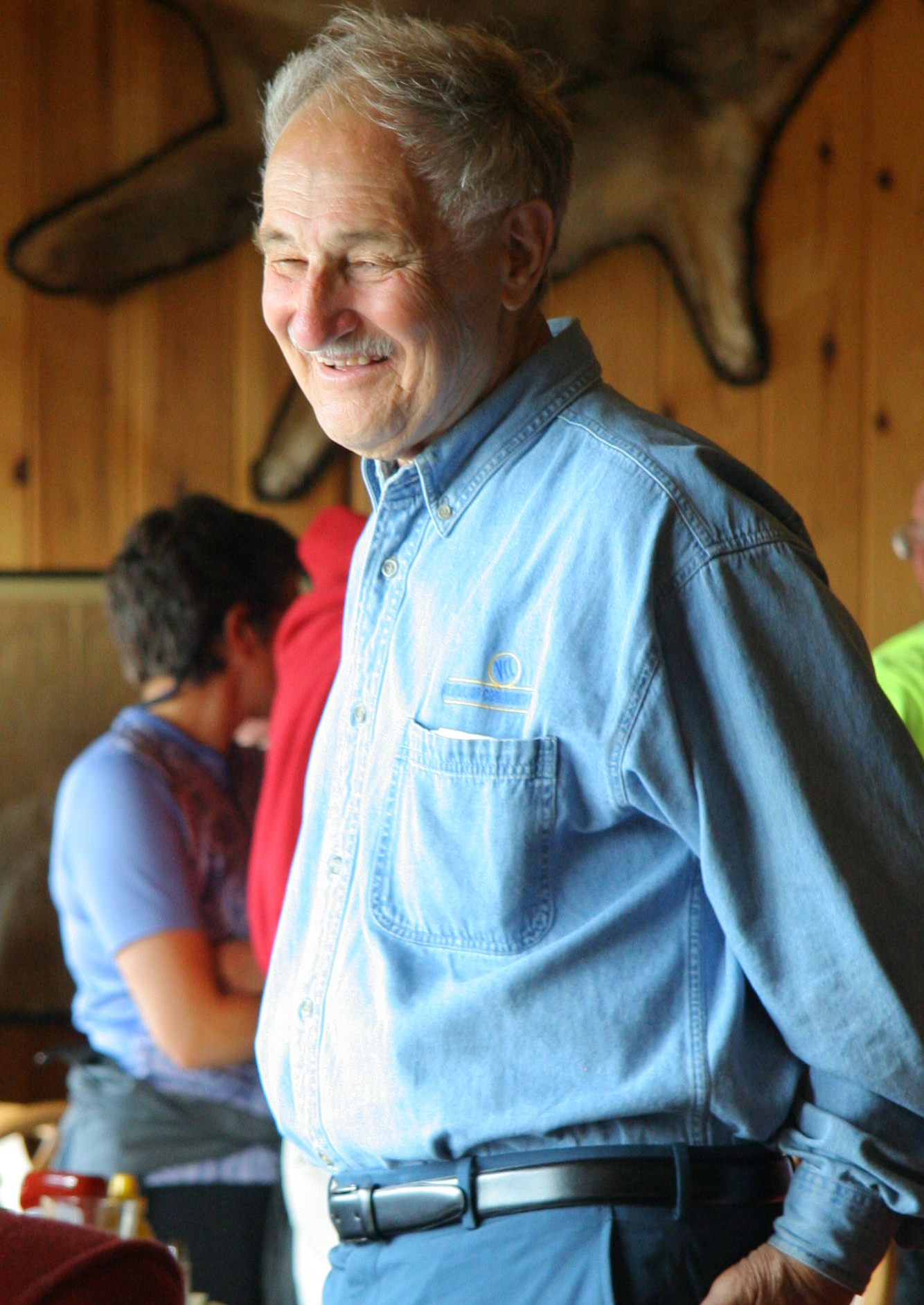
- Klobuchar in 2009
- Born: James John Klobuchar; April 9, 1928; Ely, Minnesota, U.S.
- Died: May 12, 2021 (aged 93); Burnsville, Minnesota, U.S.
- Education: Ely Junior College (AA); University of Minnesota (BA)
- Occupation: Journalist
- Employer: Star Tribune
- Spouse: Rose Heuberger (m. 1954; div. 1976)
- Children: 2, including Amy

Military service
- Allegiance: United States
- Branch/service: United States Army
- Years of service: 1950–1952
- Rank: Corporal
- Battles/wars: Korean War

James John Klobuchar (/ˈkloʊbəʃɑːr/ KLOH-bə-shar; April 9, 1928 – May 12, 2021) was an American journalist, author, and newspaper columnist from Minnesota who was a sports and politics reporter for the Minnesota Star Tribune (called the Star Tribune from 1987 to 2024).

Klobuchar was the first reporter in the country to declare John F. Kennedy's victory over Richard Nixon in the 1960 United States presidential election. He was the father of Minnesota U.S. Senator and former Hennepin County attorney Amy Klobuchar.

== Early life ==
Klobuchar was born in Ely, Minnesota, the son of Mary (Pucel) and Michael Klobuchar. His grandparents were all from Slovenia. He earned an Associate of Arts degree from Ely Junior College (now Minnesota North College – Vermilion) in 1948 and a Bachelor of Arts, cum laude, from the University of Minnesota in 1950.

== Career ==
Klobuchar served in the United States Army from 1950 to 1952 and became a corporal. He worked as a wire editor for the Bismarck Tribune in North Dakota in 1950 and as a legislative reporter from 1952 to 1953.

Klobuchar worked as a staff writer for the Associated Press in Minneapolis from 1953 to 1961 and for the Minneapolis Tribune from 1961 to 1965. He was the first to report John F. Kennedy's defeat of Richard Nixon in 1960. In 1965, he became a columnist for the Minneapolis Star, covering sports and politics. In 1984 the National Society of Newspaper Columnists honored him as an outstanding columnist. He retired in 1996.

Klobuchar continued writing after his retirement, including columns for The Christian Science Monitor, which recommended him for a Pulitzer Prize in 2003.

Klobuchar published 23 books.

== Personal life ==
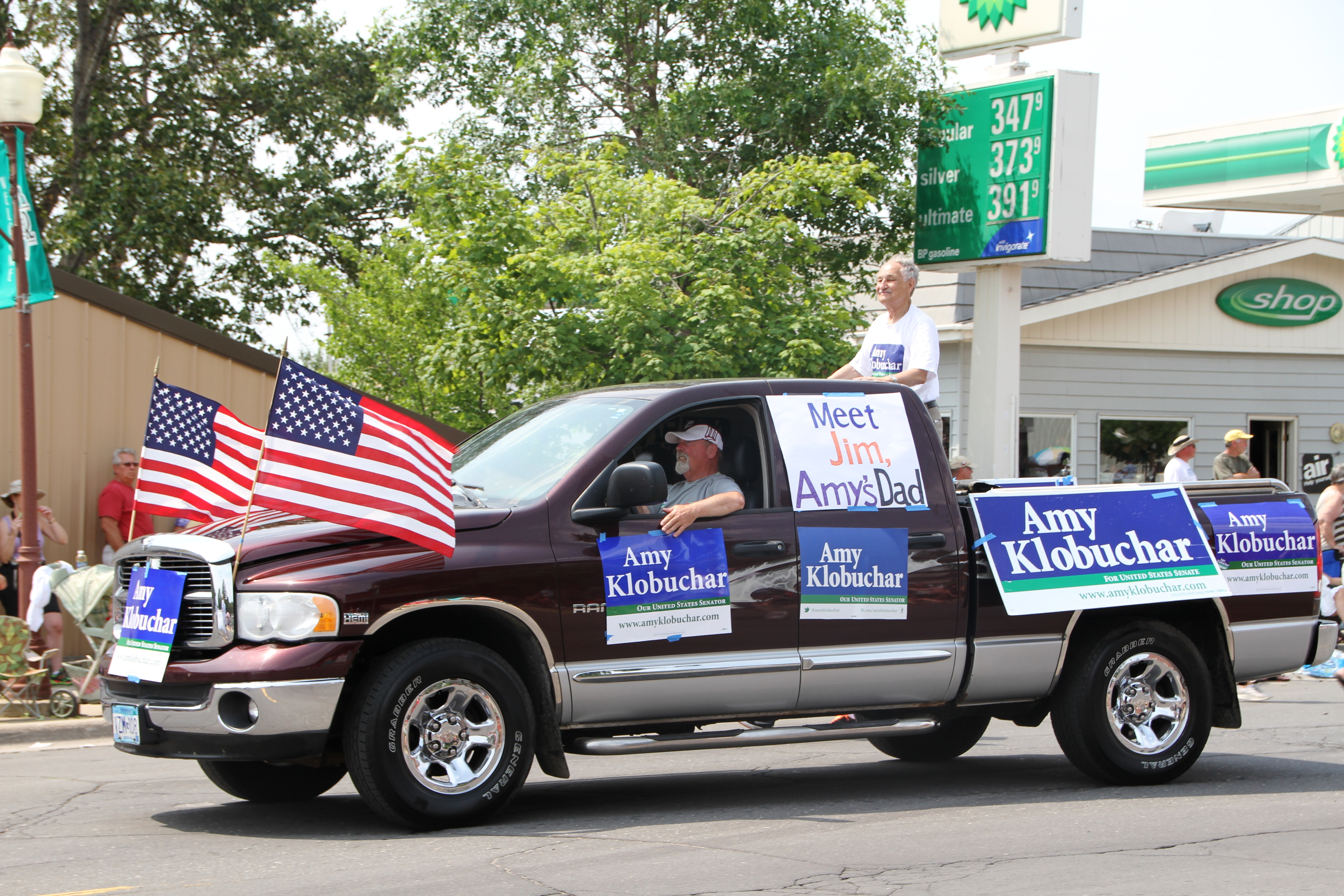
Jim Klobuchar campaigning for his daughter Amy Klobuchar

Klobuchar married Rose Heuberger on August 7, 1954. They had two children and divorced in 1976. He struggled with alcoholism, which he wrote a book about—Pursued by Grace. His daughter Amy is a United States Senator and was a presidential candidate in 2020.

During much of his life Klobuchar was an avid cyclist. He led the "Jaunt With Jim" group bicycle ride for 39 years.

=== Health and death ===
Toward the end of Klobuchar's life, he had Alzheimer's disease. He died at a care facility in Burnsville, Minnesota, on May 12, 2021, aged 93. Amy Klobuchar announced the death, saying: "He loved journalism. He loved sports and adventure. And we loved him." Minnesota Governor Tim Walz said, "Our press community lost a giant in Jim Klobuchar's passing." Plans were made to bury him in the Fort Snelling National Cemetery.

== Selected books ==
- The Zest (and Best) of Klobuchar, Mark Zelenovich, Inc., 1967.
- True Hearts and Purple Heads, Minneapolis: Ross & Haines, 1970.
- Tarkenton, New York: Harper & Row, 1976. Co-author, Fran Tarkenton.
- Will the Vikings Ever Win the Super Bowl? An Inside Look at the Minnesota Vikings of 1976, with Jeff Siemon's journal, New York: Harper & Row, 1977.
- Will America Accept Love at Halftime?, Ross & Haines, 1992
- Minstrel: My Adventure in Newspapering, Minneapolis: University of Minnesota Press, 1997.
- Pursued by Grace: A Newspaperman's Own Story of Spiritual Recovery, Minneapolis: Augsburg Fortress Publishers, 1998.
- The Cross Under the Acacia Tree: The Story of David and Eunice Simonson's Epic Mission in Africa, Minneapolis: Kirk House Publishers, 1999.
- Knights and Knaves of Autumn: 40 Years of Pro Football and the Minnesota Vikings, Cambridge, Minnesota: Adventure Publications, 2000.
- Sixty Minutes with God, Kirk House, 2003. ISBN 1-886513-78-3
- Walking Briskly Toward the Sunset, Nodin Press, 2005.
