= Frederick E. Murphy =

American businessman (1872-1940)

Frederick E. Murphy (December 5, 1872 - February 14, 1940) was an American businessman principally associated with the Minneapolis Tribune and FEMCO Farms. He garnered considerable recognition during his tenure as publisher of the Tribune for his ardent belief in the benefits of diversified farming techniques, as demonstrated through his ownership of FEMCO Farms.

== Early life ==
Born in Troy, St. Croix County, Wisconsin to Irish immigrant homestead farmers James and Mary Ellen (McGraw) Murphy, F.E. Murphy was the sixth of eight children and the younger brother of William J. Murphy. F.E. Murphy received his primary schooling in Hammond, Wisconsin and graduated from the University of Notre Dame, class of 1893.

== Career ==
Following his secondary schooling, F.E. Murphy took employment with his brother W.J. Murphy at the Minneapolis Tribune, who at the time was the owner and publisher of the newspaper. He spent several years learning the publishing business working principally in the circulation and advertising departments, eventually being promoted to assistant to the publisher. In 1910, he took the opportunity to become the Minnesota distributor for the Mitchell Motor Car Company. Early success was followed by distinct problems as the manufacturer had difficulty maintaining quality control, and Murphy eventually terminated his interest in this venture.

It was during this motorcar business venture that F.E. Murphy began forming his FEMCO farming venture in Wilkin County, Minnesota, beginning around 1918. He eventually acquired six farms encompassing over 5,000 acres and implemented diversified farming techniques and raised a variety of purebred livestock. Atypical for the times, he was convinced crop rotation and purebred livestock were the keys to advancing the financial fortunes of the typical farmer, and he used FEMCO as a showcase operation to demonstrate his beliefs.

However, the death of his brother W.J, Murphy in 1918 necessitated F.E. Murphy's return to Minneapolis in 1921 to assume the publisher role of the Minneapolis Tribune. F.E. Murphy would remain publisher and president until his death some nineteen years later. F.E. Murphy's tenure as publisher was noteworthy. He would become a recognized expert in the publishing business. The Tribune expanded greatly under his leadership and he used the Tribune as a platform to actively promote the benefits of diversified farming techniques and purebred livestock, particularly dairy cows. He served as a director for the Associated Press for eleven years during his tenure at the Tribune.

In 1933, he was named by President Franklin D. Roosevelt as the United States' delegate to the wheat conference at the London Economic Conference.

== Personal life ==
Frederick E. Murphy married Catherine Margaret Connolly, a native of Minneapolis, on January 16, 1901 in Minneapolis. They had no children.

== Death ==
Frederick E. Murphy passed away in the Waldorf Astoria New York while visiting there on business. He was laid to rest in St. Mary's Cemetery in Minneapolis adjacent to his wife and several members of her family. Numerous newspaper accounts from around the United States and beyond made note of his death, commenting on his significant contributions to the publishing world and the agricultural field.
