= The Minnesota Star Tribune =

Daily newspaper in Minneapolis, Minnesota, US

Coordinates: 44.976063°N 93.268248°W

- "The Heart and Voice of the North"

- The September 20, 2024, front page of the Star Tribune
- Type: Daily newspaper
- Format: Broadsheet
- Owner: Star Tribune Media Company LLC (Glen Taylor)
- Publisher: Steve Grove
- Editor: Kathleen Hennessey
- Opinion editor: Phil Morris
- Founded: May 25, 1867; 159 years ago (as the Minneapolis Tribune); August 19, 1920; 106 years ago (as the Minneapolis Daily Star)
- Headquarters: Star Tribune Building; 650 3rd Ave S. Suite 1300; Minneapolis, Minnesota; United States
- Circulation: 110,000 Digital Subscribers; 54,800 Average print circulation
- ISSN: 0895-2825 (print); 2641-9556 (web)
- OCLC number: 43369847
- Website: startribune.com

The Minnesota Star Tribune, formerly the Minneapolis Star Tribune, is an American daily newspaper based in Minneapolis, Minnesota. As of 2026, it is Minnesota's largest newspaper and the seventh-largest in the United States by print circulation, and is distributed throughout the Minneapolis–Saint Paul metropolitan area, the state, and the Upper Midwest.

It originated as the Minneapolis Tribune in 1867 and the competing Minneapolis Daily Star in 1920. During the 1930s and 1940s, the two papers consolidated, with the Tribune published in the morning and the Star in the evening. They merged in 1982, creating the Minneapolis Star and Tribune, renamed the Star Tribune in 1987. After a tumultuous period in which the newspaper was sold and resold and filed for bankruptcy protection in 2009, it was purchased by local billionaire and former Minnesota state senator Glen Taylor in 2014. In 2024, the paper was renamed The Minnesota Star Tribune.

The Star Tribune typically contains national, international, and local news, sports, business, and lifestyle stories. Journalists from the Star Tribune and its predecessor newspapers have won eight Pulitzer Prizes.

== History ==
=== Minneapolis Tribune ===
The Star Tribune's roots date to the creation of the Minneapolis Daily Tribune by Colonel William S. King, William D. Washburn, and Dorilus Morrison. The two men previously operated different Minneapolis newspapers, the State Atlas and the Minneapolis Daily Chronicle. The newspaper was designed to unify the local Republican Party under one newspaper. The Tribune's first issue was published on May 25, 1867. The newspaper went through several different editors and publishers during its first two decades, including John T. Gilman, George K. Shaw, Albert Shaw, and Alden J. Blethen. In 1878, the Minneapolis Evening Journal began publication, giving the Tribune its first competition. On November 30, 1889, downtown Minneapolis's Tribune headquarters caught fire. Seven people were killed and 30 injured, and the building and presses were a total loss.

In 1891, the Tribune was purchased by Gilbert A. Pierce and William J. Murphy for $450,000 (equivalent to $14.2 million in 2024). Pierce quickly sold his share to Thomas Lowry, and Lowry sold it to Murphy, making Murphy the newspaper's sole owner. His business and legal background helped him structure the Tribune's debt and modernize its printing equipment. The newspaper experimented with partial-color printing and the use of halftone for photographs and portraits. In 1893, Murphy sent the Tribune's first correspondent to Washington, D.C. As Minneapolis grew, the newspaper's circulation expanded; the Tribune and the Evening Journal were closely competitive, with the smaller Minneapolis Times in third place. In 1905, Murphy bought out the Times and merged it with the Tribune.

He died in 1918, endowing a school of journalism at the University of Minnesota. After a brief transitional period, Murphy's younger brother Frederick E. Murphy became the Tribune's publisher in 1921.

=== Minneapolis Daily Star ===
The other half of the newspaper's history begins with the Minnesota Daily Star, which was founded on August 19, 1920, by elements of the agrarian Nonpartisan League and backed by Thomas Van Lear and Herbert Gaston. The Daily Star had difficulty attracting advertisers with its overtly political agenda and went bankrupt in 1924. After its purchase by A. B. Frizzell and former New York Times executive John Thompson, the newspaper became the politically independent Minneapolis Daily Star.

=== Cowles era ===
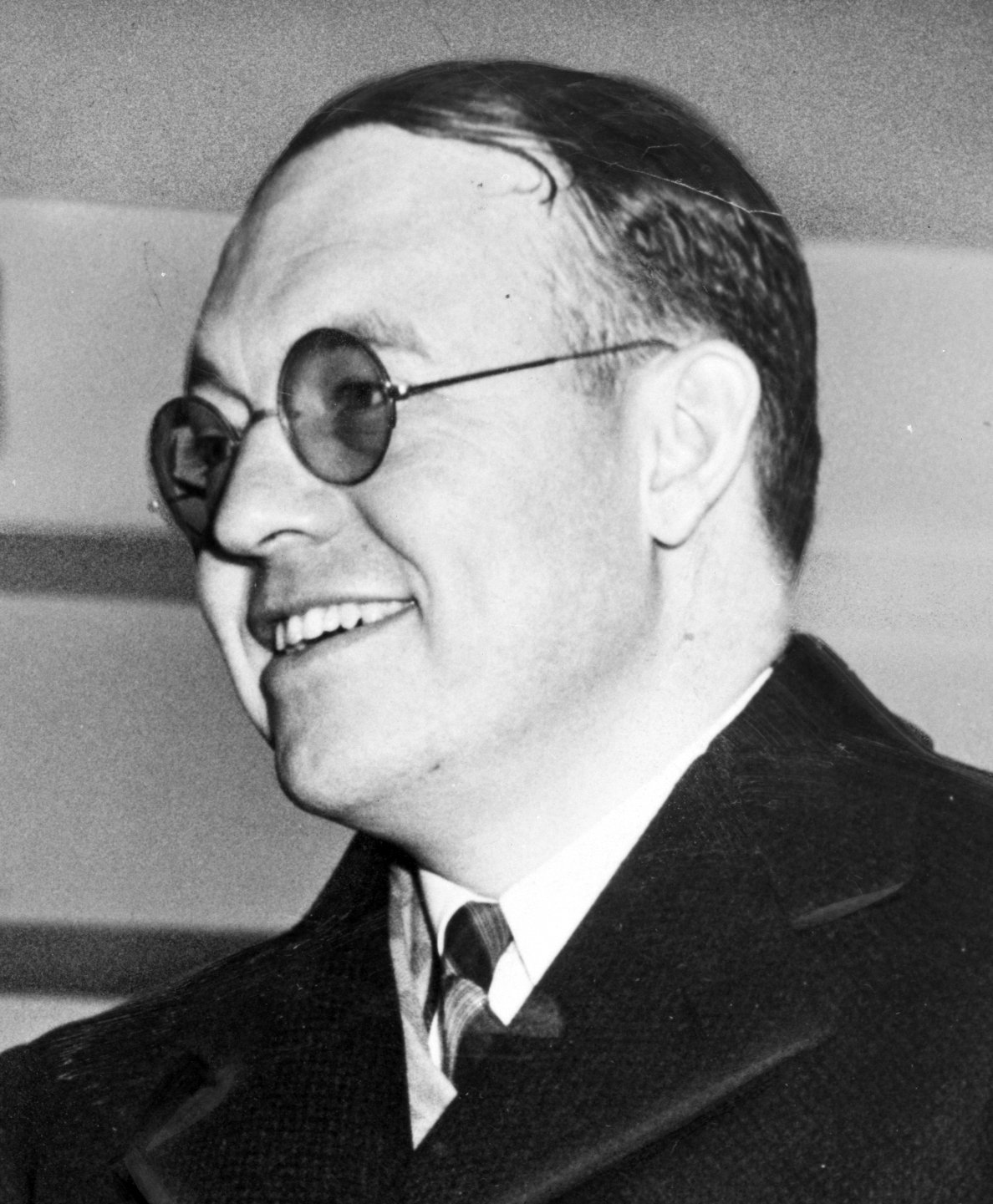
Star manager John Cowles Sr.

In 1935, the Cowles family of Des Moines, Iowa purchased the Star. The family patriarch, Gardner Cowles Sr., had purchased The Des Moines Register and the Des Moines Tribune during the first decade of the century and managed them successfully. Gardner's son, John Cowles Sr., moved to Minneapolis to manage the Star. Under him, it had the city's highest circulation, pressuring Minneapolis's other newspapers. In 1939, the Cowles family purchased the Minneapolis Evening Journal, merging the two newspapers into the Star-Journal. Tribune publisher Fred Murphy died in 1940; the next year, the Cowles family bought the Tribune and merged it with their company, giving it ownership of the city's major newspapers. The Tribune became the city's morning newspaper, the Star-Journal (renamed the Star in 1947) was the evening newspaper, and they published a joint Sunday edition. A separate evening newspaper (the Times) was spun off and published separately until 1948.

In 1944, John Cowles Sr. hired Wisconsin native and former Tulsa Tribune editor William P. Steven as managing editor of the two newspapers; Steven became vice president and executive editor in 1954. During his tenure in Minneapolis, he was president of the Associated Press Managing Editors Association in 1949 and first chairman of the organization's Continuing Study Committee. By August 1960, John Cowles Jr. was vice president and associate editor of the two papers, and it was soon apparent that he disapproved of Steven's hard-nosed approach to journalism. When Steven chafed under the younger Cowles's management, he was fired.

After Steven's ouster, Cowles Jr. was editor of the two newspapers; he became president in 1968 and editorial chairman the following year. He had a progressive political viewpoint, publishing editorials supporting the civil rights movement and liberal causes.

In 1982, the afternoon Star was discontinued due to dwindling circulation, a trend common for afternoon newspapers. The two papers merged into a single morning paper, the Minneapolis Star and Tribune. Cowles Jr. fired publisher Donald R. Dwight. His handling of Dwight's termination led to his removal as editor in 1983, although his family retained a controlling financial interest in the newspaper.

In 1983, the Star and Tribune challenged a Minnesota tax on paper and ink before the Supreme Court of the United States. In Minneapolis Star Tribune Co. v. Commissioner, the court found that the tax (which targeted specific newspapers) violated the First Amendment. In 1987, the newspaper's name was simplified to Star Tribune, and the slogan "Newspaper of the Twin Cities" was added.

=== 1998 to present ===
In 1998, the McClatchy Company purchased Cowles Media Company for $1.4 billion, ending the newspaper's 61-year history in the family in one of the largest sales in American newspaper history. Although McClatchy sold many of Cowles's smaller assets, it kept the Star Tribune for several years. On December 26, 2006, McClatchy sold the paper to private equity firm Avista Capital Partners for $530 million, less than half of what it had paid for Cowles eight years earlier.

In March 2007, Par Ridder was appointed Star Tribune publisher after his predecessor, J. Keith Moyer, left the newspaper after the sale. Ridder is a member of the Ridder family, which had owned Knight Ridder (publishers of several newspapers, including at that time the rival St. Paul Pioneer Press). Ridder's arrival resulted in litigation when it was discovered that he had stolen a hard drive containing information about employees and advertisers, which the Pioneer Press called "trade secrets". Ridder also took two high-ranking staff members to the Minneapolis paper, which raised eyebrows since such employees usually have non-compete clauses in their contracts. On September 18, 2007, Ridder was removed from his post by a Ramsey County judge, and he resigned on December 7.

On January 15, 2009, the paper, then the country's 15th-largest daily, filed for bankruptcy under Chapter 11. On September 17, the United States Bankruptcy Court for the Southern District of New York approved a bankruptcy plan for the Star Tribune, which emerged from bankruptcy protection on September 28. The paper's senior secured lenders received about 95% of the post-bankruptcy company.

Since 2010, the Star Tribune has given out awards to the "Top 150 Workplaces in Minnesota".

Since the Star Tribune's bankruptcy, its former ownership group, led by New York City–based Avista Capital Partners, has no stake in the company.

Wayzata Investment Partners became majority owner of the Star Tribune Company in August 2012, with a 58% stake. In 2014, the company was acquired by Glen Taylor, owner of the NBA's Minnesota Timberwolves and the WNBA's Minnesota Lynx. A former Republican state senator, Taylor said the Star Tribune would be less liberal under his ownership. He also said the paper had already begun a shift and would focus on accurately reporting both sides of all issues. In May 2015, the company acquired alternative weekly City Pages from Voice Media Group. City Pages continued publishing until it became another victim of advertising revenue loss and the COVID-19 pandemic. It shuttered in October 2020, and the website was moved to the Hennepin County Library's archives.

In September 2025, the paper announced it would sell its printing plant in Minneapolis, lay off 125 workers, and outsource printing to a plant in Iowa. Operation Metro Surge, a federal immigration operation launched in Minnesota in the winter of 2025-26, had a significant impact on the Star Tribune, which made an unpaywalled live blog available for the duration. In January 2026, the paper's website was the second-most-visited of any local newspaper, up 14 places from the previous year. Its web traffic doubled, and its subscription rate "nearly doubled", according to a senior staff member. In June 2026, the paper announced that it would lay off 15% of its workforce, amounting to 65 employees, and that it was considering a nonprofit ownership model.

== Editions ==
After the 1987 formation of the Star Tribune, the newspaper was published in three editions: one for Minneapolis and the western suburbs, one for St. Paul and the eastern suburbs, and a state edition for Minnesota and the Midwest. The St. Paul edition was discontinued in 1999 in favor of a metro edition for the Minneapolis–St. Paul area and a state edition for areas beyond the metropolitan area.

Although the newspaper competes with the St. Paul–based Pioneer Press in the Minneapolis–St. Paul area, the Star Tribune is more popular in the western metropolitan area, and the Pioneer Press is more popular in the eastern metro area. The newspapers share some printing and delivery operations.

The Star Tribune went online in 1995, introducing the StarTribune.com website the following year. In 2011, the website erected a paywall.

== Departments ==
The Star Tribune has five main sections: main news, local news, sports, business, and variety (lifestyle and entertainment). Special weekly sections include Taste (restaurants and cooking), travel, Outdoors Weekend, and Science + Health. The Sunday edition has a more prominent editorial and opinion section, Opinion Exchange.

== Awards ==
Journalists with the pre-merger Minneapolis Star and Minneapolis Tribune won three Pulitzer Prizes:

- 1948: Nat S. Finney (Minneapolis Tribune), National Reporting
- 1959: William Seaman (Minneapolis Star), Photography
- 1968: Nathan K. (Nick) Kotz (Des Moines Register and Minneapolis Tribune), National Reporting

Star Tribune journalists have won three Pulitzers:

- 1990: Lou Kilzer and Chris Ison, Investigative Reporting
- 2013: Steve Sack, Editorial Cartooning
- 2013: Brad Schrade, Jeremy Olson and Glenn Howatt, Local Reporting

In 2021, the staff of the Star Tribune won the Pulitzer prize for breaking news coverage for the "urgent, authoritative and nuanced" coverage of the murder of George Floyd.

In 2026, the newspaper won the Pulitzer Prize for breaking news coverage again, for its work on the Annunciation Catholic Church shooting.

== Notable staff ==
In April 2023, Steve Grove became the new publisher after Michael Klingensmith stepped down. Grove was the head of the Minnesota Department of Employment and Economic Development under Minnesota Governor Tim Walz. He formerly worked as a reporter and a Google executive, leading the Google News Lab. Klingensmith had served as publisher since 2010.

- Dan Barreiro, sportswriter
- Jon Bream, pop music critic for 52 years (since 1974)
- Nick Coleman, politics and news reporter
- Dick Guindon, cartoonist
- Sid Hartman, sportswriter
- Jim Klobuchar, columnist covering sports, politics and human interest
- James Lileks, humorist and local news reporter
- Patrick Reusse, sportswriter
- R. T. Rybak, reporter, Minneapolis mayor
- Jim Souhan, sportswriter
- Dan Stoneking, Minneapolis Star sports editor

== Headquarters and printing plant ==
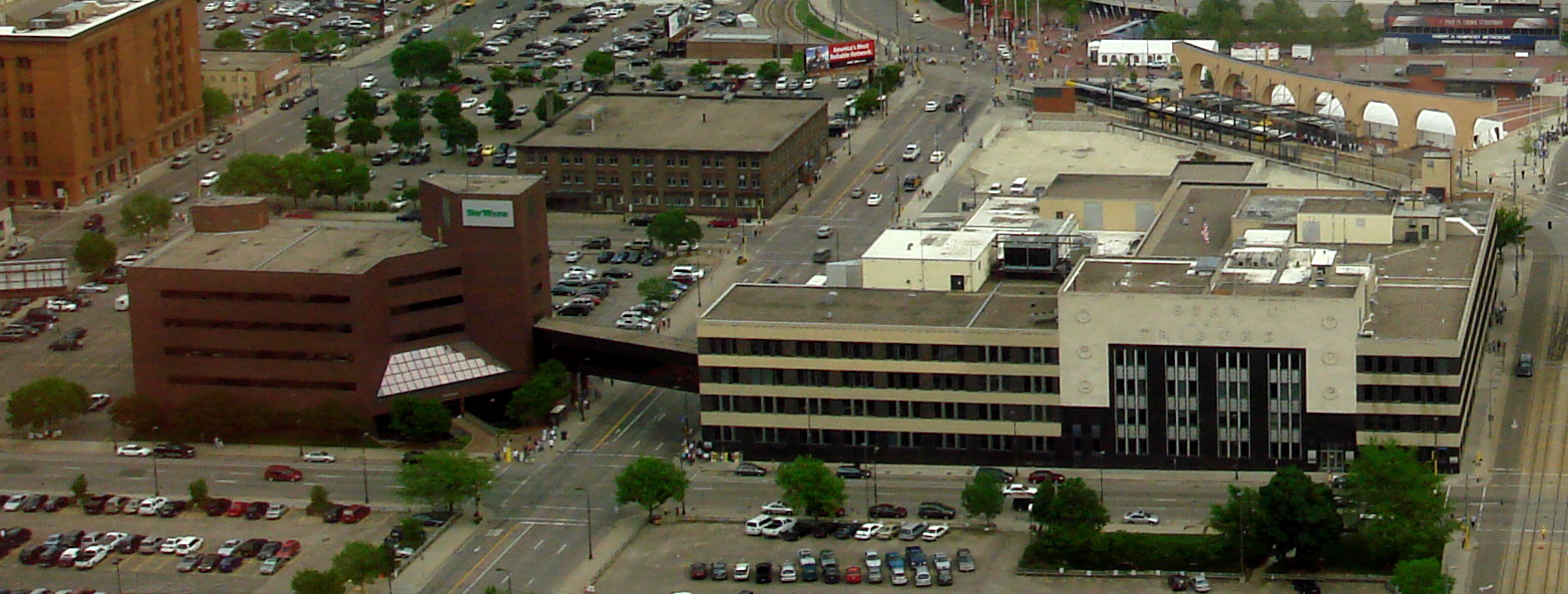
Star Tribune Downtown East headquarters until 2015

After the Cowles family consolidated the city's newspapers, their offices were gradually moved to the former the Daily Star headquarters in downtown Minneapolis. The building was renovated from 1939 to 1940 and expanded in a larger renovation from 1946 to 1949. After 1949, the building housed the offices and presses of the Star and the Tribune. During the 1980s, an annex, the Freeman Building, was built across the street from the headquarters and connected with a skyway. In 1987, the Star Tribune opened a new, $110 million printing plant, called the Heritage Center, in a historic warehouse district on the northern edge of downtown Minneapolis. Its five offset presses took over printing all Star Tribune editions. News and business offices remained in the downtown headquarters, whose old presses were removed.

In 2014, the company announced that it would relocate from the 95-year-old headquarters building to the newly christened Star Tribune Building at the Capella Tower complex, making way for development around nearby U.S. Bank Stadium. Demolition of the buildings began in 2014; the last employees relocated in mid-2015, and the demolition was completed later that year. Also in 2014, the Star Tribune's Heritage printing plant began printing the St. Paul Pioneer Press under a contract with its cross-town rival. The following year, USA Today contracted with the Star Tribune to print regional copies of its daily edition at the Heritage plant. Printing plants owned by those newspaper companies in St. Paul and Maple Grove, Minn., shut down.

== See also ==
- List of newspapers published in Minnesota
