= Billy Murphy (fashion entrepreneur) =

Irish-born British fashion entrepreneur

William Paul Murphy (7 July 1940 – 19 December 2014), was an Irish-born British fashion entrepreneur, best known for being the founder of The Emperor of Wyoming in London's King's Road, which sparked a boom in "vintage Americana".

William Paul Murphy was born on 7 July 1940 in Cork, Ireland. His father, a hotelier, died when he was young, and his mother then ran a pub in Cork and brought up Billy and his four siblings.

In 1972, Murphy founded The Emperor of Wyoming, a shop on London's King's Road (named after the opening track on Neil Young's 1968 debut solo album), that sold vintage clothes imported from the US, with a cowboy and Western theme.
