= William J. Murphy (RAF officer) =

World War II pilot (1916–1939)

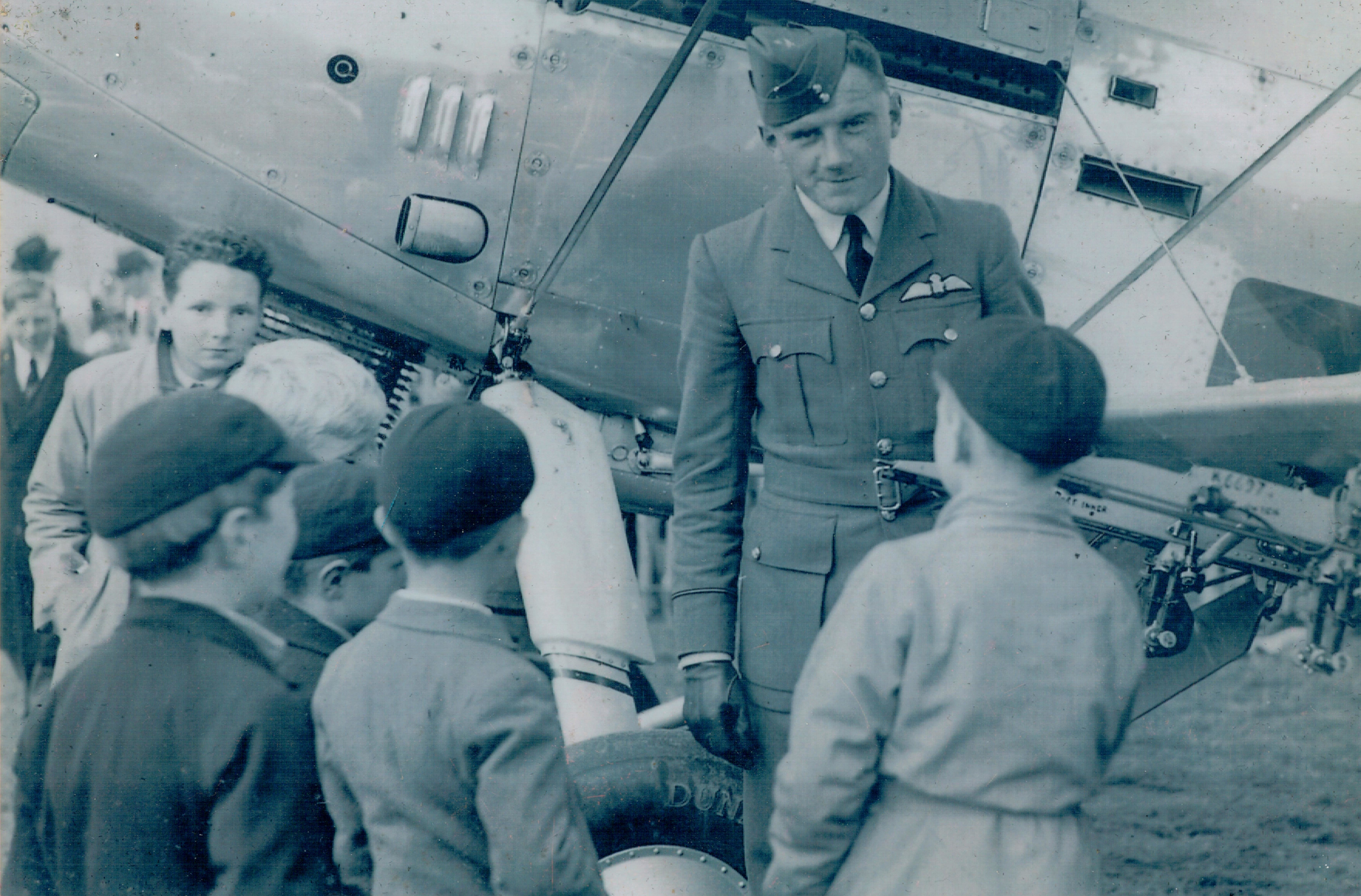
William J. Murphy

William J. Murphy (1916 – 4 September 1939) was the first British Royal Air Force (RAF) bomber pilot to be shot down and killed during World War II.

Murphy was born in Mitchelstown, County Cork in Ireland to William Joseph Murphy and Katherine C. Murphy.

== World War II ==
Murphy was the pilot of a Bristol Blenheim of 107 Squadron, which was taking part in the RAF's first bombing raid of the war against enemy ships in the German port of Wilhelmshaven on 4 September 1939.

Fifteen Blenheim medium bombers of 107 and 110 Squadrons flew a mission to attack German ships. Several planes had to return to base having failed to find their target. Of the five remaining planes of 107 Squadron, four were shot down over Wilhelmshaven. Murphy was killed with the rest of his crew, Sergeant L.R. Ward and AC2 E. Patemam. Murphy was 23 years old.

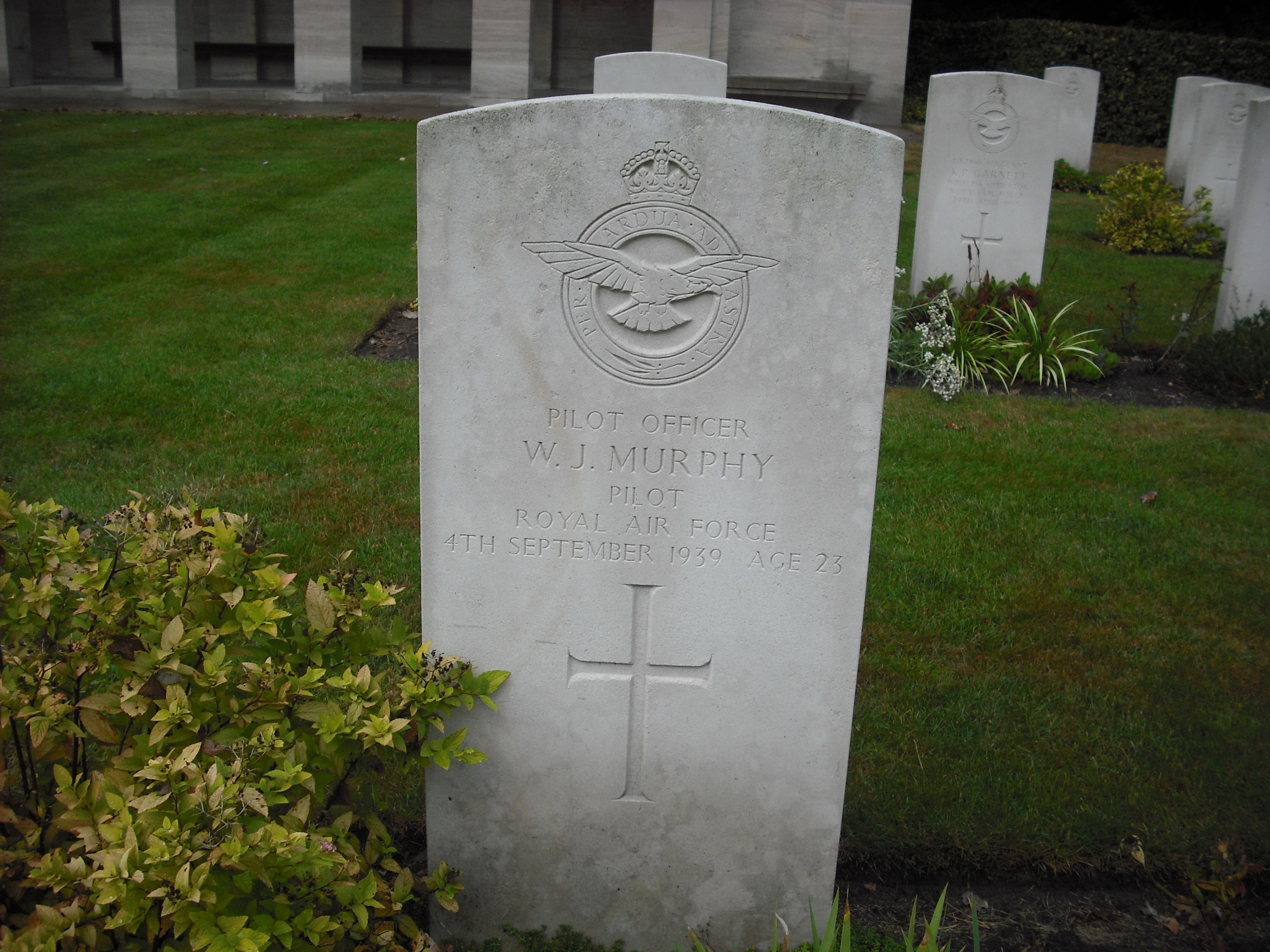
Williams Grave

Among the other crewmen killed on the raid was Sgt. Albert Prince, the first Canadian to be killed in action during World War 2. Prince's crew survived to become the longest-serving British POW's of World War 2. In return for these losses, slight damage was inflicted on the German cruiser Emden.

Murphy is buried in Sage War Cemetery, Germany.
