= Ski-U-Mah (magazine) =

US magazine

One of the first issues of Ski-U-Mah, from December 1929.

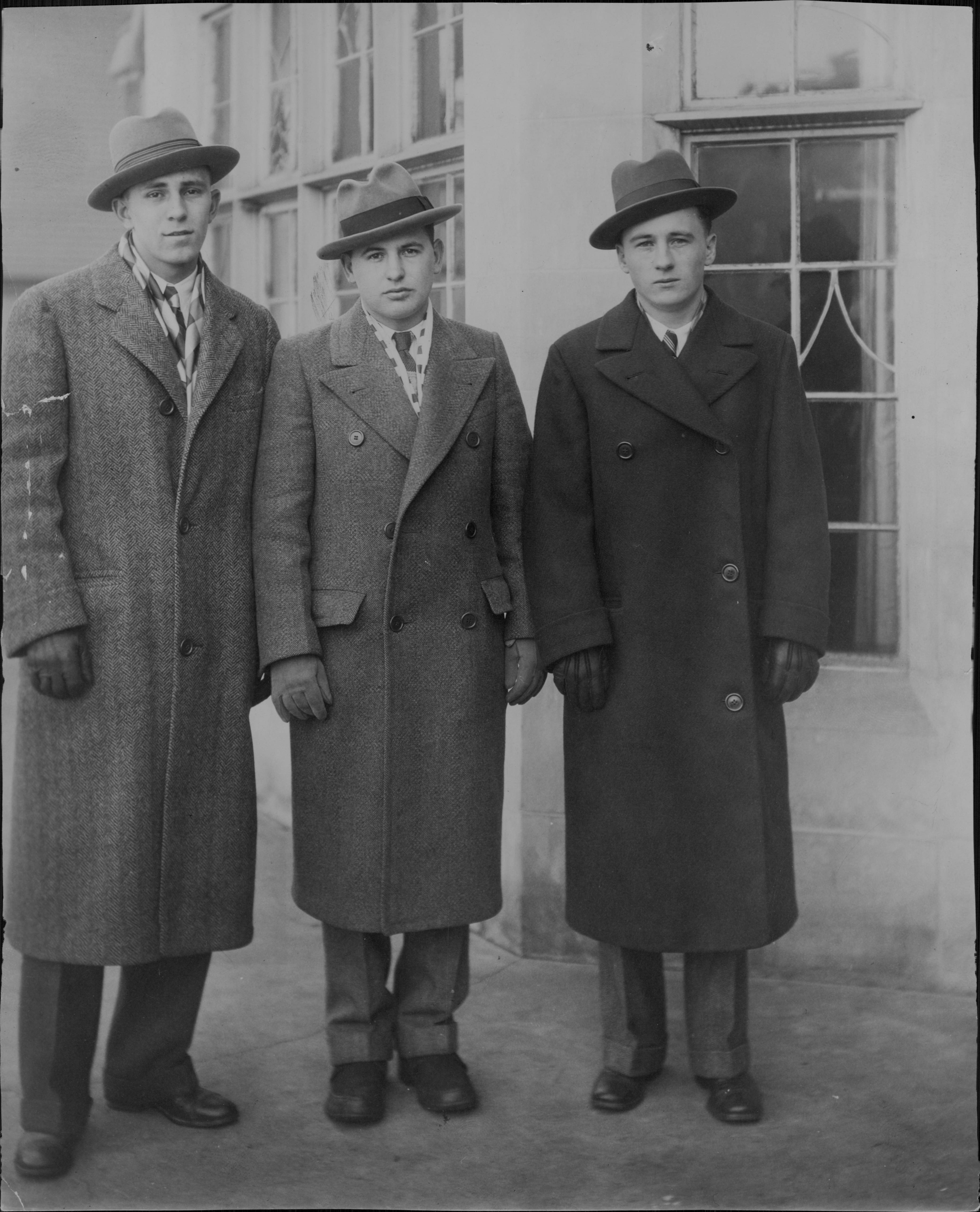
Ski-U-Mah staff members Clark Craig, John Healy, and Thomas Roberts (1927)

Ski-U-Mah (pronounced sky-you-ma), was the college humor magazine of the University of Minnesota (and named for a U. of M. sports cheer) from about early 1920s to 1950. The magazine was affiliated to the Sigma Delta Chi fraternity in the university. It was modeled on Harvard Lampoon.

Its most prominent writer was Max Shulman, who later wrote the stories that became the television program The Many Loves of Dobie Gillis.
