= Mildred Johnson Library =

Academic library in North Dakota, US

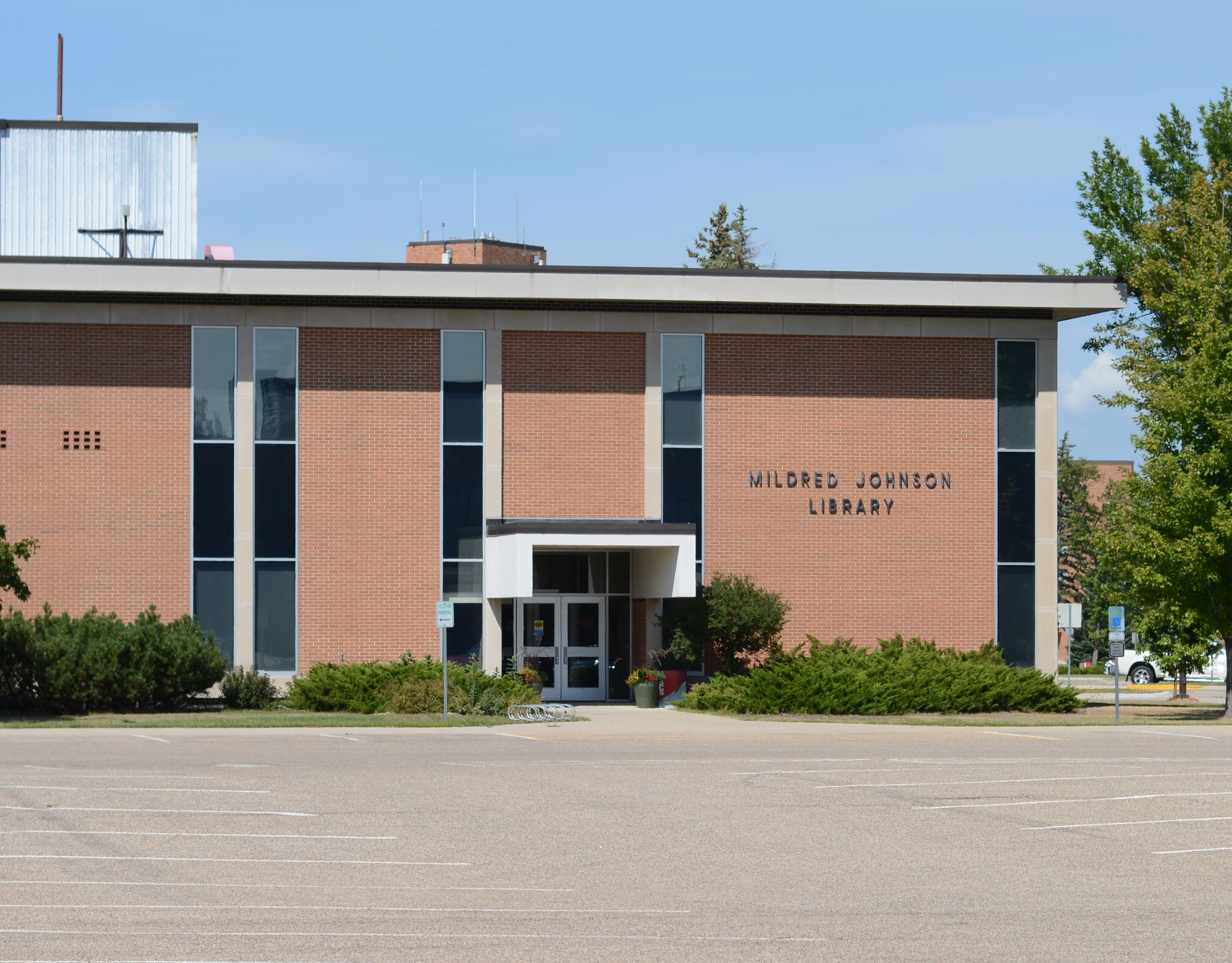
South entrance of Mildred Johnson Library, on the campus of North Dakota State College of Science in Wahpeton, North Dakota

Mildred Johnson Library is an academic library on the campus of North Dakota State College of Science (NDSCS) in Wahpeton, North Dakota.

The library serves 3,367 students and provides access to approximately 7,109 physical books and 100,343 digital media items.

The library's archival collection spans more than 120 years (1903–present) and encompasses the history of the college, one of the oldest community colleges in the United States.

Other collection highlights include: The Fritz Scholder Collection (books, a DVD, photos, and other print material related to the 1995 exhibition of Shoulder’s work “Master of the Southwest” held in NDSCS's Stern Cultural Center and to the artist’s prolific career), the Louise Erdrich Collection (a curated collection of the author’s books, articles and short stories, as well as reviews of and excerpts from her books), and the Gewalt Oriental Print Collection (donated by a NDSCS alumnus).

Designed by Bernard H. Hillyer Associates, the building was dedicated on March 19, 1970. The 40,010 ft. design includes both collaborative work spaces and individual study spaces. Prior to construction of the Mildred Johnson Library building, NDSCS's library was housed in Old Main.

The library was named for Mildred Johnson, a pioneer of North Dakota law and the first woman on the North Dakota State Board of Higher Education.
