= Janette Hill Knox =

American temperance reformer, suffragist and editor (1845–1920)

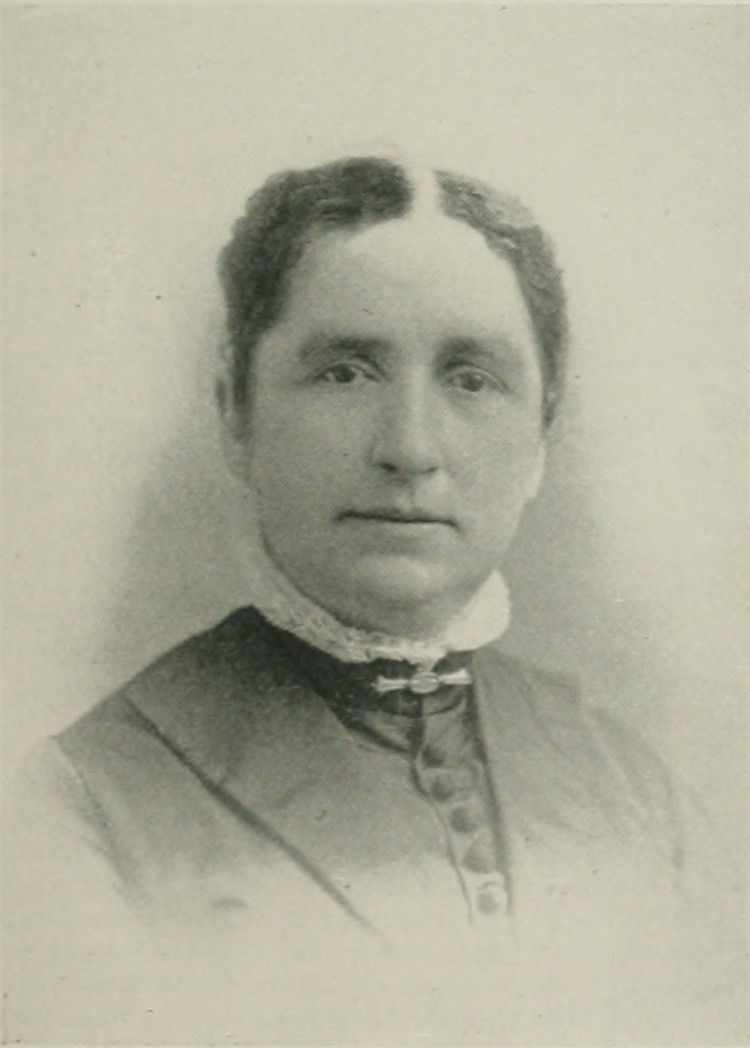
Portrait photo from A Woman of the Century

Janette Hill Knox (January 24, 1845 – July 28, 1920) was an American temperance reformer, suffragist, teacher, author and editor. She served as President of the New Hampshire State Woman's Christian Temperance Union (WCTU).

== Early life and education ==
Janette Hill was born in Londonderry, Vermont, January 24, 1845. She was the daughter of Lewis Hill, a reverend of the Vermont Conference of the Methodist Episcopal Church. Her mother's maiden name was Olive Marsh. Hill was reared in a quiet New England clerical home.

Hill went to school in the various towns to which her father's itinerant assignments took the family, including Vermont public schools. Her education also included at the Vermont Methodist Seminary, Montpelier, Vt. (L.L.A. 1869) (now, Vermont College of Fine Arts), Baker University, Baldwin, Kansas (A.B.), Boston University (A.M. 1879), and Allegheny College, Meadville, Pennsylvania (Ph.D.).

== Career ==
On January 9, 1871, in Craftsbury, Vermont, Hill married the Rev. Martin Van Buren Knox, Ph.D., D.D. (1841-1912), of Schroon Lake, New York. In 1873, after their only child, a son, died at birth, they moved to Kansas. Knox graduated with an A.B. from Baker University in Baldwin, Kansas and then was on the faculty for four years, along with her husband. She went to Boston University in 1877 for special studies in English literature and modern languages and received the degree of A. M., with her husband, from the School of All Sciences in 1879. Their duties then took them to the New Hampshire Conference of the Methodist Episcopal Church.

Later, Knox earned a Ph.D. at Allegheny College in Meadville, Pennsylvania and taught for many years at Red River Valley University (Methodist Episcopal), Wahpeton, North Dakota. In addition to being a faculty member, she served as vice-president, English Language, French and German.

Late in the 1870s, the Knox family returned East where Mr. Knox became a member of the New Hampshire Conference of the Methodist Episcopal Church, serving pastorates at Claremont, Lebanon, Littleton, and Manchester. About this time, Mrs. Knox became interested in the WCTU, due partly to the fact that she was a distant relative of Frances Willard.

In 1881, Know was elected president of the New Hampshire State WCTU and served in this role for eleven years, her re-election year by year being practically unanimous. In addition, for eight years, she served as the Vice-president-at-large, North Dakota State WCTU. A suffragist, Knox was elected vice-president of the Equal Suffrage Association of North Dakota in 1901 at the organization's annual conference.

During the opening years of the 20th century, the Knox family moved East once more, settling in Boston, Massachusetts. Mrs. Knox immediately resumed her work in connection with the WCTU, and was elected corresponding secretary of the Massachusetts State Union, holding that position for another eight years.

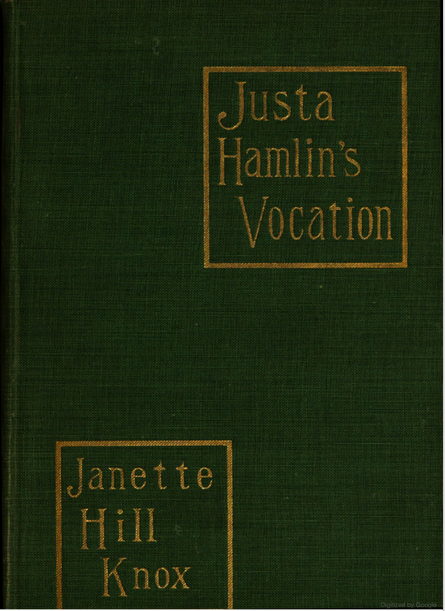
Justa Hamlin's Vocation

Knox's book, Justa Hamlin's Vocation, was published by Abbey Press (1902, New York City). It gave glimpses of the life and work of a minister's wife in a rural community, replete with the pathos and humor enountered by those engaged in philanthropic work. From 1904, she was also managing editor of its official organ, Our Message. She wrote frequently for religious and temperance periodicals.

A lecturer, Knox spoke before temperance gatherings while serving the cause of Prohibition. She also lectured at missionary meetings, Chautauqua Assemblies, teachers' conventions, and elsewhere. She was a member of missionary societies (U.S. and foreign), and of the Woman's Literary Club of Wahpeton. Her travels and recreations took her to the Selkirk Mountains, the White Mountains, and the Great Plains.

== Later life ==
Rev. Knox died in 1912. In her later years, she resided at Stoneham, Massachusetts with her niece, Nettie Miller and grandniece, Olive Miller. Knox died at the home of another niece, Mrs. Verne F. Miles, Bradford, Vermont, July 28, 1920, (Note: According to Cherrington (1928), Knox died July 29, 1925.) having been accompanied there by Nettie and Olive for a vacation.

== Selected works ==
- Justa Hamlin's Vocation, 1902
