= Clark Williams =

Clark Williams may refer to:

- Clark Williams (New York politician) (1870–1946), American banker and New York State Comptroller 1909–1910
- Clark Williams (North Dakota politician) (1942–2020), American politician
