= Mary Shaw =

Mary Shaw may refer to:

- Mary Shaw (contralto) (1814–1876), English classical contralto of concerts and operas
- Mary Shaw (actress) (1854–1929), American actress, suffragette, early feminist, and playwright
- Mary Shaw (computer scientist) (born 1943), American software engineer
- Mary Shaw Shorb (1907–1990), American research scientist
- Mary Turner Shaw (1906–1990), Australian architect

== Fictional characters ==
- Mary Shaw, in the Canadian animated web series Mary and Flo On the Go!, voiced by Rebecca Liddiard
