= Anna Astvatsaturian Turcotte =

Armenian-American writer, lecturer, philanthropist and human rights advocate

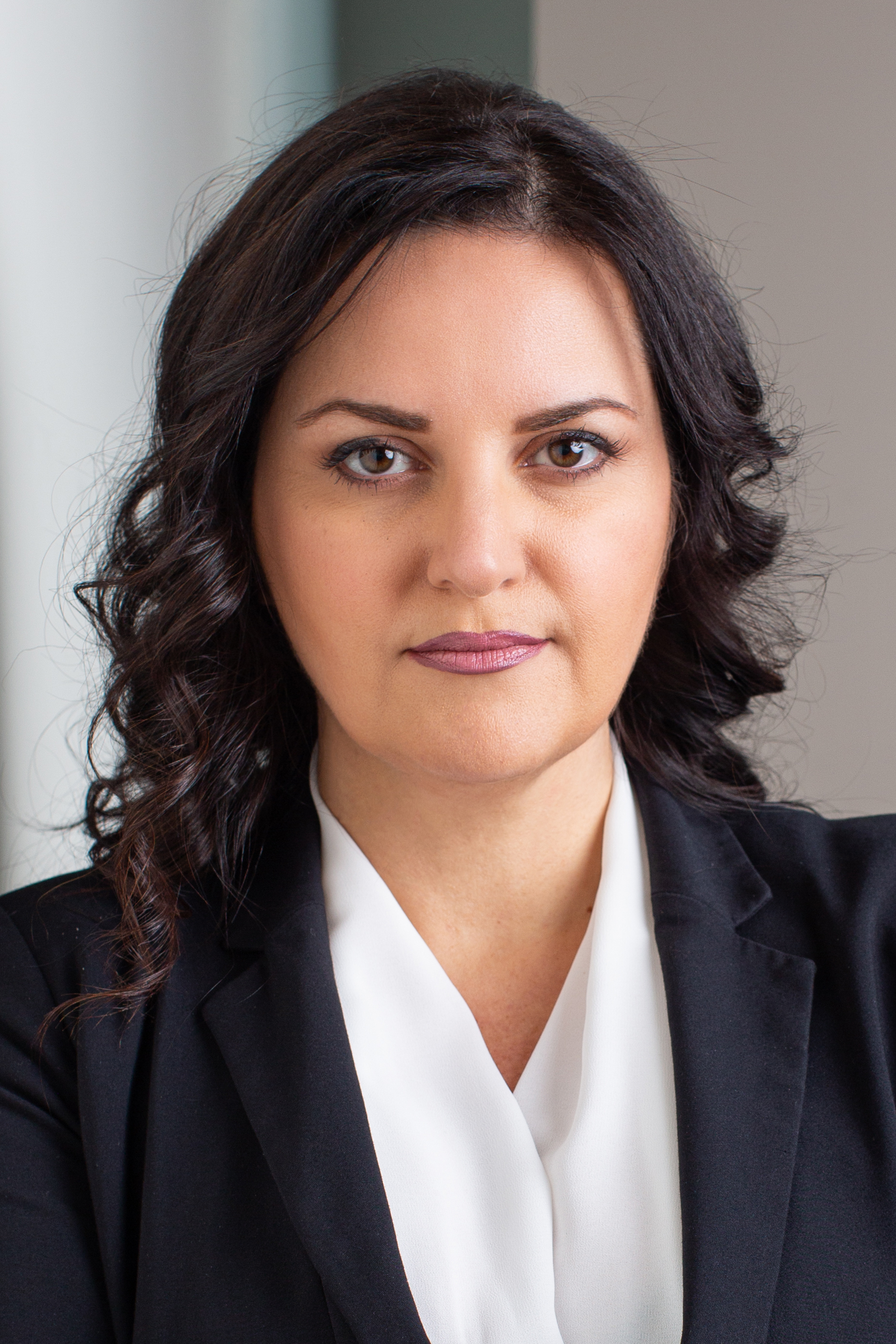
- Born: Anna Norikovna Astvatsaturova; March 14, 1978 (age 48); Baku, Azerbaijan SSR, Soviet Union
- Writing career
- Notable works: Nowhere, a Story of Exile
- Notable awards: The Medal of Mkhitar Gosh, NKR “Gratitude” medal
- Website: astvatsaturian.org

Anna Astvatsaturian Turcotte (born Anna Norikovna Astvatsaturova; March 14, 1978) is an Armenian-American writer, lecturer, philanthropist and human rights advocate. She wrote Nowhere, a Story of Exile (2012). She has lectured extensively about the plight of Armenians in Azerbaijan in the context of human rights and international law, as well as defending the political rights of Armenians to establish autonomy in Nagorno-Karabakh. She was instrumental in gaining passage by the legislature of the State of Maine of a 2013 resolution recognizing the independence of the Nagorno-Karabakh Republic. In 2015, she was elected member of the Westbrook, Maine City Council. She was elected president of the council in 2021 and reelected as president in 2022, becoming Westbrook’s first immigrant and first female president of the city council.

== Early life ==
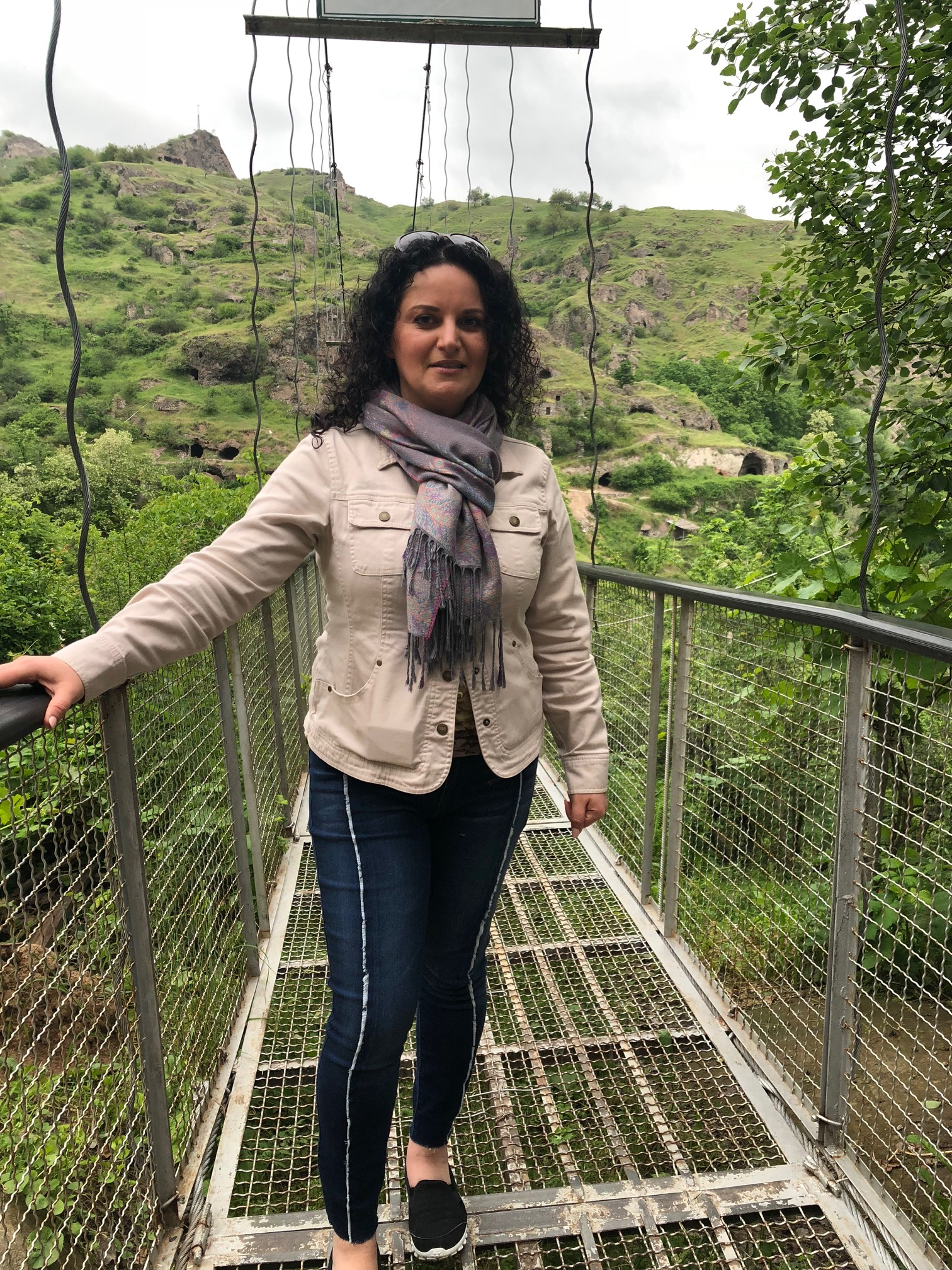
Anna Astvatsaturian Turcotte in Hin Khndzoresk.

Turcotte was born in Baku, Azerbaijan, the daughter of two artists, Norik Astvatsaturov and Irina Astvatsaturova. She fled with her family due to anti-Armenian attacks in Baku in 1989. They spent three years in Armenia as refugees before immigrating to the United States in 1992. Her family was placed in Wahpeton, North Dakota, where she became a naturalized U.S. citizen in 1997.

== Education ==
She studied at the University of North Dakota and received degrees in English & Literature and Philosophy & Religion, along with a minor in Russian Language and Literature. She received her Juris Doctor degree from the University of Maine School of Law in Portland, Maine in 2003. After graduating from law school, she worked as a clerk at the International Criminal Court in The Hague, Netherlands.

== Career ==
Turcotte has written and lectured extensively about Armenian issues across the United States, including on Capitol Hill. She has also spoken to the European Parliament on issues of human rights, international law, and anti-Armenianism.

She advocated and worked to support the State of Maine's 2013 resolution recognizing the independence of the Nagorno-Karabakh Republic. She has discussed Azerbaijani policy regarding the independence of Nagorno-Karabakh with members of the Congress and the European Parliament. Astvatsaturian Turcotte is an advisory board member of the non-governmental organization Americans for Artsakh.

In 2015, Astvatsaturian Turcotte spoke at TEDx Grand Forks about her experiences as a refugee and human rights activists. On November 3, 2015, Anna Turcotte won the election to Ward 3 of the Westbrook, Maine City Council. She received 64% of the total vote, unseating incumbent Paul Emery.

In 2018 Astvatsaturian Turcotte was reelected to Westbrook City Council, representing Ward 3. She ran unopposed. Astvatsaturian Turcotte has a successful career in banking regulatory risk and compliance.

Turcotte was elected vice president of the council on December 3, 2018.

Turcotte was elected president of the council on December 6, 2021, to become the council's first refugee and first female leader.

== Publications ==
In 2012, she published her first book, Nowhere, a Story of Exile. It was based on a childhood diary she kept while her family faced the ethnic violence in Baku during the First Nagorno-Karabakh War. She began translating the entries into English at the age of 14. She described their lives as refugees in Armenia after they escaped Baku. Her book was a first-person account of the anti-Armenianism in Azerbaijan and the Baku pogrom against Armenians. The book was translated into Russian in 2017 and into Armenian in 2022.

== Philanthropy ==
Turcotte spearheaded various humanitarian projects to benefit the vulnerable population in Armenia and Artsakh Republic, such as supporting Baku Armenian refugees in both Armenia and Artsakh and initiatives supporting the children of Artsakh. She sponsored eyecare surgeries, screenings, and provided eyeglasses for two villages in Syunik province of Armenia, where her paternal grandparents originated.

In the last few years Anna has gathered and sent over 300 lb of ballet clothing to Artsakh Ballet College in Stepanakert.

Some notable projects were inspired by the memory of the 30th anniversary of the Baku Pogroms. To honor this anniversary Anna launched several projects. 2019-2020 Anna and Armenia Tree Project planted a forest in memory of survivors, victims of the Baku Pogroms against Armenians and to honor the community of Baku Armenians that spread around the world as refugees. She made possible the Armath Lab – a computer lab with a 3D printer for children in School #8 in Stepanakert, Artsakh. She has been a vocal supporter of the wounded Armenian soldiers and their families and has donated and fundraised for these efforts to heal the wounded soldiers, provided, a kitchen and a bath, and provided medical kits and solar panels to posts on the border of Artsakh with Azerbaijan.

In early 2020 Turcotte launched Anna Astvatsaturian Foundation, a public charitable organization to continue and expand her philanthropic duties. One of the foundation's first initiatives was to conduct a full country post-war census of Artsakh Republic and its citizens, documenting their stories and losses. In 2022, on International Children’s Day Astvatsaturian Turcotte launched “Ser Artsakh” to provide baby essentials to every newborn in Artsakh.

== Awards ==
Anna Astvatsaturian Turcotte was awarded the Mkhitar Gosh Medal of Honor from President of Armenia Serzh Sargsyan and the Nagorno-Karabakh Gratitude Medal from Nagorno-Karabakh Republic President Bako Sahakyan in 2013. In 2014, she was awarded the Vahan Cardashian award by the Armenian National Committee of America - Western Region.

In 2017, she was awarded an Activism Award by the Armenian National Committee of America - Eastern Region.
