= Russell T. Thane =

American politician (1926–2020)

Member of the North Dakota Senate from the 25th district
- In office 1971–2006

Personal details
- Born: July 14, 1926 Denver, Colorado
- Died: November 10, 2020 (aged 94) Wahpeton, North Dakota
- Party: Republican
- Spouse: Betty
- Profession: farmer

Russell T. Thane (July 14, 1926 – November 10, 2020) was an American politician who was a member of the North Dakota State Senate. He represented the 25th district from 1971 to 2006 as a member of the Republican party. He was an alumnus of the North Dakota State College of Science, North Dakota State University and Rutgers University Eagleton Institution of Politics. Thane was a farmer and resided in Wahpeton, North Dakota.
