= North Dakota State College of Science =

College in Wahpeton, North Dakota, US

Coordinates: 46°16′22″N 96°36′30″W

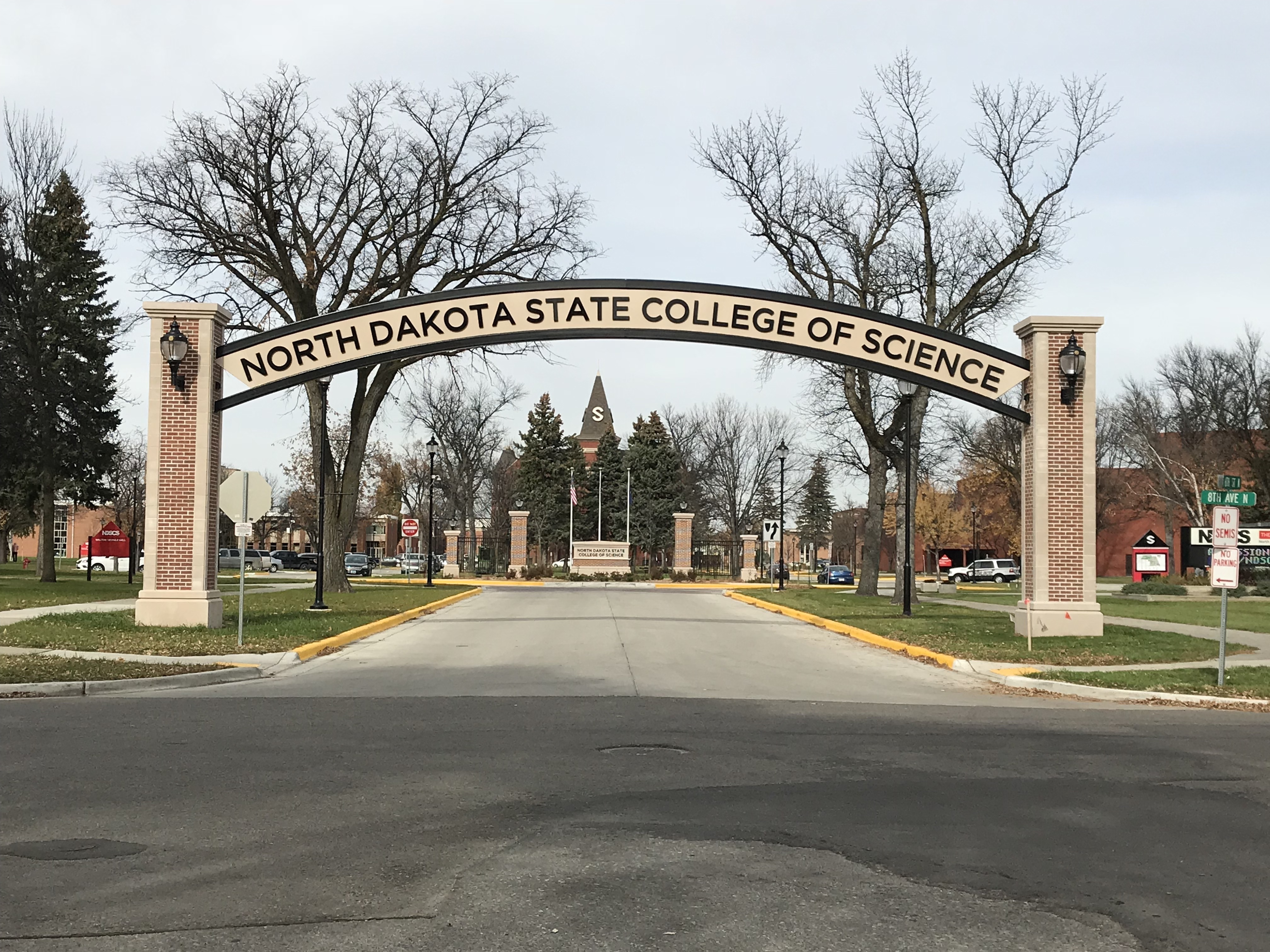
- Motto: NDSCS The Science of Success
- Type: Public college
- Established: 1903; 123 years ago
- Parent institution: North Dakota University System
- Academic affiliations: Space-grant
- President: Rod Flanigan
- Students: 2,802 (Fall 2021)
- Location: Wahpeton, North Dakota, United States
- Campus: Rural
- Colors: Red and Black
- Nickname: Wildcats
- Mascot: Wildcat Willie
- Website: www.ndscs.edu

The North Dakota State College of Science (NDSCS) is a public college in Wahpeton, North Dakota, United States. It is part of the North Dakota University System. Founded in 1903 by provision of the state constitution, the State College of Science offers degrees, certificates, and diplomas in more than 80 academic options in traditional career and technical studies as well as the liberal arts. The college also offers a variety of distance education and online courses.

== Campus ==
The main campus of the North Dakota State College of Science is located in Wahpeton. A second site, referred to as NDSCS-Fargo, is located on 19th Avenue North in Fargo, North Dakota.

=== Main campus ===
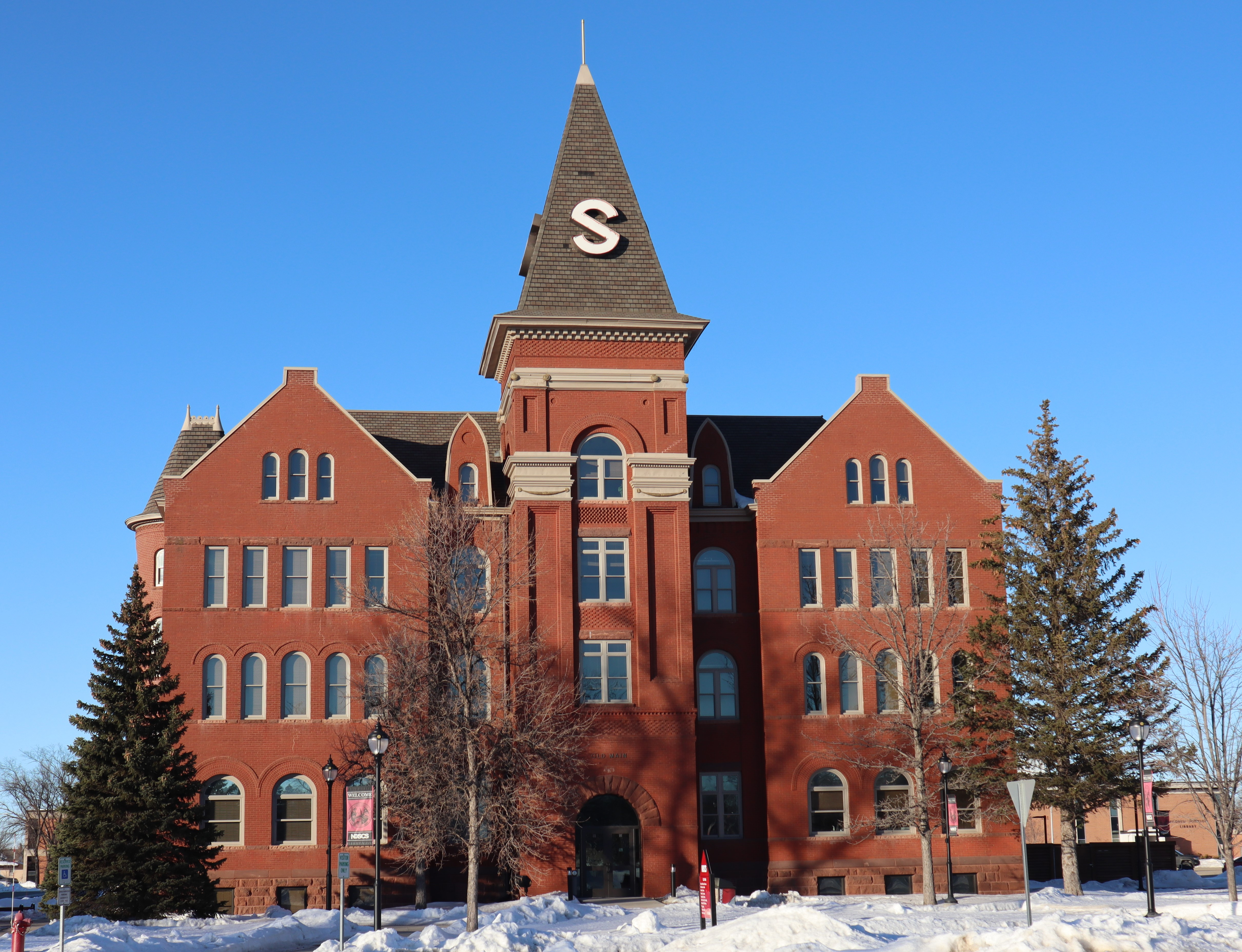
NDSCS Old Main on the main campus in Wahpeton

The main campus sits on 128 acres of land and consists of 35 campus buildings. The campus is located by 8th Avenue to the south and 4th Street to the east. Old Main — the centerpiece of the NDSCS campus for generations — has been listed on the National Register of Historic Places since 1984. Designed by architect John M. Coxhead, Old Main was built in 1891 as the original home of Red River Valley University. The North Dakota Academy of Science opened in the building's west wing in 1903. Old Main sits on the north side of the main oval, where many campus activities take place.

=== NDSCS-Fargo ===
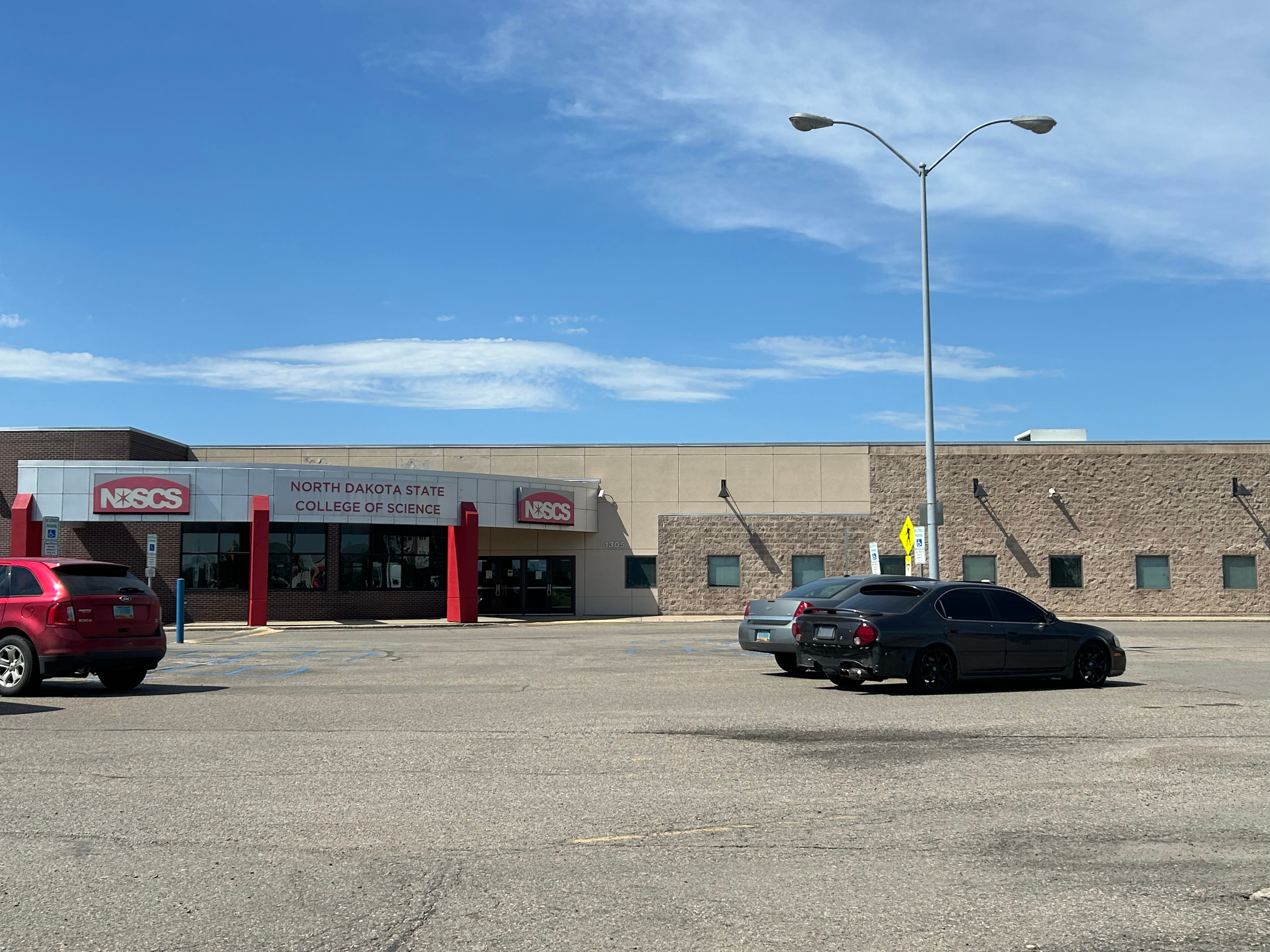
North Dakota State College of Science in Fargo

NDSCS-Fargo is a campus of North Dakota State College of Science. Located across from the Fargodome on 19th Avenue North in Fargo, NDSCS-Fargo serves as the home to academic programming and non-credit training.

== Academics ==
NDSCS offers academic options in the following career clusters:

- Agriculture, Food and Natural Resources
- Architecture and Construction
- Automotive and Diesel Technology
- Business, Management and Administration
- Finance
- Education and Training
- Health Science
- Hospitality and Tourism
- Human Services
- Information Technology
- Law, Public Safety, Corrections and Security
- Manufacturing
- Marketing, Sales and Services
- Science, Technology, Engineering and Mathematics (STEM)
- Transportation

NDSCS is a member of the Metro College Alliance, which allows students to take classes at other institutions in the Fargo-Moorhead area.

== Athletics ==
The North Dakota State College of Science's sports teams are known as the Wildcats. The NDSCS Wildcats are members of the National Junior College Athletic Association (NJCAA).

NDSCS's intercollegiate teams include:

- Women's basketball
- Men's basketball
- Volleyball
- Softball
- Football
- Baseball

== Notable alumni ==
- Gene Anderson, professional wrestler
- Milos Vranes (born 1995), basketball player in the Austrian Basketball Bundesliga
- James Batemon III (born 1997), basketball player in the Israeli Basketball Premier League
- Rick Berg, Republican former U.S. Representative for North Dakota's at-large congressional district
- Randy Boehning, Republican member of the North Dakota House of Representatives
- Jerry Gaetz, North Dakota state senator
- James Kerzman, Republican former member of the North Dakota House of Representatives
- Kim Koppelman, Republican member of the North Dakota House of Representatives
- Paul Marquart, DFL member of the Minnesota House of Representatives
- Scott Matthew, NDSSS 1987 Southwestern University, former professional basketball player, Winnipeg Thunder, WBL. Municipal judge in Texas.
- Donald Grant Nutter, 15th Governor of Montana
- Tim Purdon, 18th U.S. Attorney for the District of North Dakota
- Creighton Leland Robertson, 9th bishop of the Episcopal Diocese of South Dakota
- Gilmore Schjeldahl, businessman and inventor
- Andre Smith, Former professional basketball player 2007–2016. Most notably in Italy and Turkey.
- Russell T. Thane, Republican former member of the North Dakota State Senate

== See also ==
- Mildred Johnson Library
- Old Main (North Dakota State College of Science)
- Death of Andrew Sadek
