= Chahinkapa Zoo =

- Interactive map of Chahinkapa Zoo
- 46.2747°N 96.598°W
- Date opened: 1933
- Location: Wahpeton, North Dakota
- No. of animals: 200+
- No. of species: 70
- Website: www.chahinkapazoo.org

Chahinkapa Zoo is an 29-acre (12 ha) zoo in Wahpeton, North Dakota. Opened in 1933 on land that had been purchased in 1903, it is the first zoo built in North Dakota. It is open May through October and by appointment during the winter. It features over 200 animals ranging from gibbons to Bengal tigers and White rhinos.

== History ==
Wahpeton purchased the land for Chahinkapa Park from the federal government in 1903. In 1933, the town established a Park Board with R.J. Hughes as director, and started the zoo with just a few animals.

In the 1960s, the zoo was moved to its current location, occupying 18 acres (7.3 ha) at the North end of Chahinkapa Park. The Chahinkapa Zoo Association was formed in 1974 to help plan and raise money for the zoo, and by 1984 a master plan had been developed.

In 1989, the Rodger Ehnstrom Nature Center was opened as the center of educational activity in the zoo. The zoo hired its first director in 1994, and was accredited by the Association of Zoos and Aquariums (AZA) in 1995.

In April 1997, the zoo was flooded, but all animals were safely evacuated and the zoo reopened at the end of May. Subsequently, a levee was constructed to protect the North side of Walpeton (including the zoo) from 500 year flood levels. The zoo was renovated at this time with new exhibits, paths, and a petting zoo.

== Animals ==
The zoo is home to more than 200 animals representing about 100 species.

Primates at the zoo include orangutan, white-handed gibbon, black-handed spider monkey, and ring-tailed lemur. Grazing mammals include Bactrian camels, plains zebras, southern white rhinos, llama, alpaca, American bison, and elk. Other mammals include Bengal tigers, cheetahs, snow leopards, fossa, grizzly bear, cougar, bobcat, river otters, and red kangaroos. Birds at the zoo include bald eagle, red-tailed hawk, rough-legged hawk, turkey vulture, black vulture, great horned owl, eastern screech owl, peregrine falcon, Indian peafowl, pheasants, ducks, Australian black swans, and peafowl.

Reptiles at the zoo include American alligator, blue-tongued skink, red-tailed boa, Burmese star tortoise, sulcata tortoise, radiated tortoise and leopard tortoise.

== Carousel ==
The Prairie Rose Carousel is a restored 1926 wood carousel built by Spillman Engineering for Lee Funland in upstate New York. It has twenty jumping horses arranged in two rows, and two chariots. Music is provided by band organ #125 from the Johnson Organ Co., itself being an excellent example of a twentieth century Calliope. The carousel is now housed in a climate controlled pavilion.
