= Red River Valley University =

- U.S. National Register of Historic Places
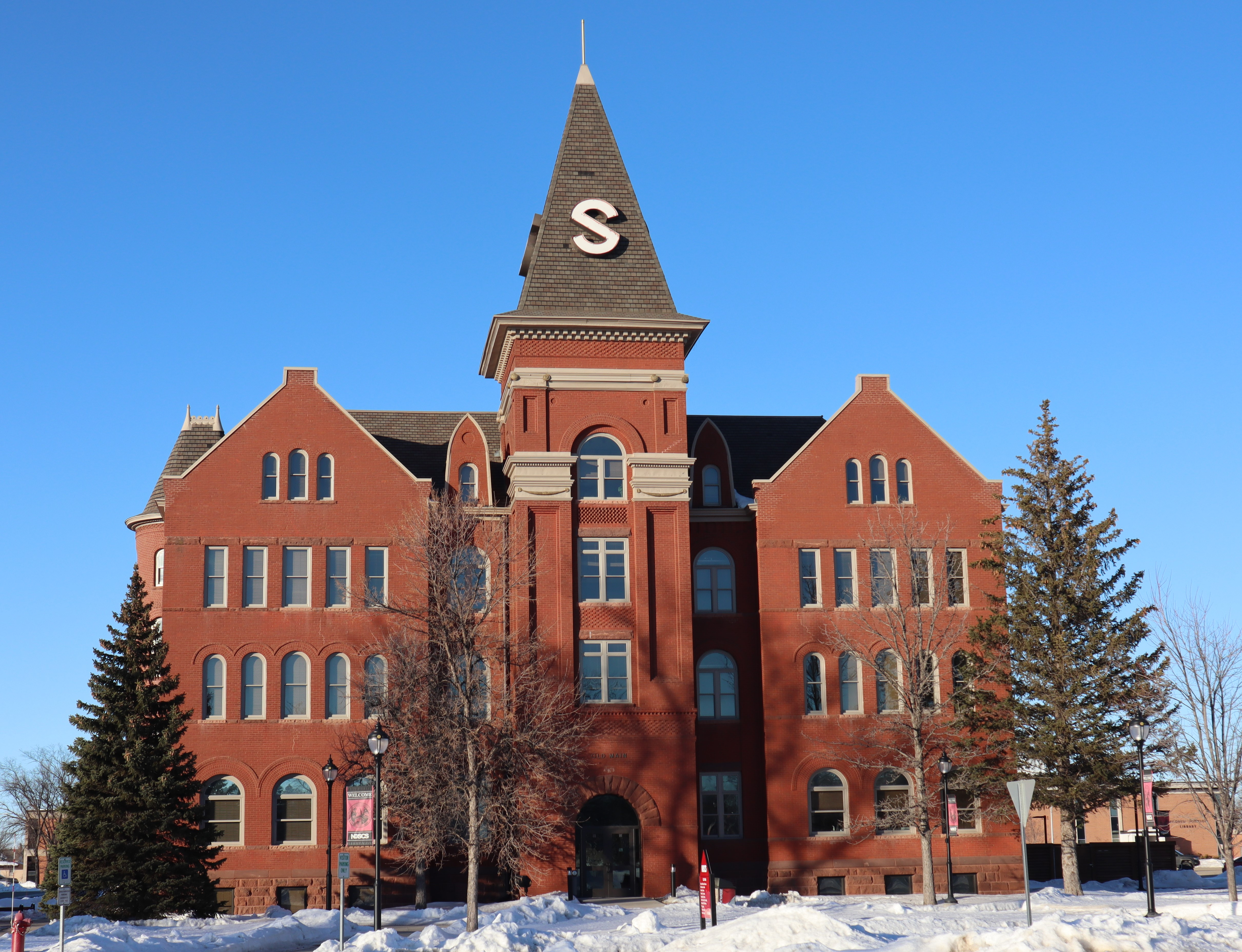

- Location within North Dakota Location within the United States
- Location: North 6th Street, Wahpeton, North Dakota
- Coordinates: 46°16′27″N 96°36′29″W
- Area: less than one acre
- Built: 1891-92
- Architect: Coxhead, John H.
- NRHP reference No.: 84002770
- Added to NRHP: April 26, 1984

Red River Valley University was a private liberal arts college located in Wahpeton, North Dakota, and affiliated with the Methodist Church. The university opened in 1893, and operated independently until 1905, when limited funds forced the closure of the Wahpeton campus. The university's trustees then forged an affiliation agreement with the University of North Dakota (UND), and reopened the school on the UND campus as "Wesley College."

The former Red River Valley University building in Wahpeton still survives, and is known as Old Main on the campus of the North Dakota State College of Science. It was added to the National Register of Historic Places in 1984.

The Old Main building is a three-story red brick building which is H-shaped in plan. It has a five-story square bell tower over the main entry.

== Notable people ==
- Janette Hill Knox (1845-1920), faculty and Vice-President, English Language, French and German
