= Clark Williams (North Dakota politician) =

American politician (1942–2020)

Member of the North Dakota House of Representatives from the 25th district
- In office 2001–2015
- In office 1983–1987

Personal details
- Born: July 12, 1942 Wahpeton, North Dakota
- Died: November 16, 2020 (aged 78) Breckenridge, Minnesota
- Party: Democratic-NPL
- Spouse: Gail
- Profession: Teacher

Clark Williams (July 12, 1942 – November 16, 2020) was an American politician in the state of North Dakota. He was a member of the North Dakota House of Representatives, representing the 25th district. A Democrat, from 2002 to 2015, he also served from 1983 to 1987. Williams was an alumnus of North Dakota State University and Valley City State University and was an educator.
