= Mary Shaw Shorb =

American biochemist

- Born: January 11, 1907; Wahpeton, North Dakota, U.S.
- Died: August 18, 1990 (aged 83); Maryland, U.S.
- Education: College of Idaho; University of Maryland, College Park
- Occupation: Research scientist
- Known for: First assay method for Vitamin B12

Mary Shaw Shorb (January 11, 1907 – August 18, 1990) was an American research scientist, best known for the development of a bacteriological assay procedure for the chemical compound now known as Vitamin B12.

== Early years ==
Shaw was born on January 7, 1907, in Wahpeton, North Dakota, about forty miles south of Fargo. Her parents were Mary McKean and Ernest Shaw. The family moved to Caldwell, Idaho when Mary was three years old. She developed an early interest in biology through a neighbor and family friend, Dr. William Judson Boone. Founder and first President of the College of Idaho, Dr. Boone was a well-known botanist, and taught biology at the college. During fishing trips that turned into "teaching moments," he taught her about edible mushrooms and sparked a lifelong interest in native wildflowers.

Shorb graduated from Caldwell High School and started classes at the College of Idaho in 1924. Outside of her college schoolwork, she served as Director of a Founders Day celebration and as Editor of the college yearbook, The Trail. She graduated in 1928 with a B. S. degree in biology and a minor in Home Economics.

Mary's older brother was then attending medical school at Johns Hopkins Hospital in Baltimore, Maryland. She landed a job there as a dietitian, although she had to take a "crash course," on the job, to adapt her background to the work. Dissatisfied with that direction, she looked for something else. Shorb discovered that the School of Hygiene was hiring under a new grant to study the common cold. She was quickly hired as a research technician.

By the time the money ran out on the grant, Shorb had decided to pursue a doctorate in immunology. By then she was married to childhood sweetheart Doys Shorb. Doys entered the Johns Hopkins graduate program in parasitology. Shorb received her Sc.D. from Hopkins in 1933.

== Underemployment and family life ==
The couple began looking for jobs, but right then was perhaps one of the toughest years of the Great Depression. Shorb tried for a position at Washington State College (now University), which would have put them closer to their families in Idaho. Unfortunately, few such jobs were going to women at that time, no matter how well-qualified they were.

She finally found a job as a social worker in Baltimore. Strictly a New Deal expedience position, it was hardly what Shorb had in mind when she decided on a scientific career. Thus, when the couple's first child, Barbara, was born in 1936, she decided to stay home. Two years later, their son Alan was born. Then, in 1942 their daughter Carole Elizabeth ("Betsy") was born.

By then, the manpower demands of World War II had opened up many technical positions. With a new baby to care for, Shorb wasn't sure she wanted to go back to work. However, an ex-classmate from Johns Hopkins asserted that "it was her patriotic duty" to use her education for the war effort. Although her job title was "bacteriologist," she performed basically a technician's procedures. And the procedures were rather unpleasant – grinding up rat carcasses among them.

She soon found another job, this time with the Bureau of Dairy Industries in the U.S. Department of Agriculture. While still basically a technician's position, it at least involved biological microorganisms. Her job was to culture Lactobacillus lactis Dornier (LLD), which was used to make yogurt and other fermented dairy products. "Everyone knew" that the LLD growth media had to contain liver extract to work. Only Shorb took an active interest in why, but she was hamstrung by the rote nature of her position.

Any remote chance for more in-depth study at the Dairy bureau ended in 1946. Shorb was bumped from her position by a returning veteran.

== Research contributions ==
For her doctoral dissertation, Shorb had developed an antigen that turned out to be a worthwhile treatment for pneumonia. In fact, for a while before the development of sulfa drugs in the late 1930s, her antigen was widely used for such treatments. So she had already proven her abilities to improve human health.

Shorb knew that the same liver extract required to culture LLD was also the only effective treatment for pernicious anemia. That disease earned the designation "pernicious" because it was almost invariably fatal, prior to the discovery of the raw liver treatment method in 1926. Even then, advanced cases might not respond. In fact, Mary's father-in-law had died from the disease. As with the yogurt culture media, no one knew what component of liver extract was the active ingredient. By the time Shorb took an interest, other researchers had only managed to separate the extract into active an inactive fractions. In theory, if you followed the prescribed procedure, the result would contain the active ingredient. That still did not tell you how much of the unknown substance you had. That could be determined only by treating a patient and observing how he or she responded.

Shorb deduced that the LLD growth rate could be refined as an assay method for the active ingredient. Out of a job, she did manage to find some laboratory space at the University of Maryland. However, with few professional credentials, Shorb would need some luck to obtain funding for further research.

Fortunately, a pernicious anemia researcher from Merck & Company, Dr. Karl August Folkers, visited the university to talk about collaborative projects. He saw merit in her idea and persuaded his management to fund a trial. Despite the paltry level of the initial grant – $400 – Shorb proved the efficacy of her bioassay method. Merck was so impressed that they kept sending funds "for the rest of Mary's professional life."

With the assay breakthrough, Folkers and his Merck team isolated crystals of the active ingredient – Vitamin B12 – from multiple sources within about three months. With the discovery and isolation of vitamin B12, pernicious anemia ceased to be the scourge that had persisted for centuries.

In 1949, the University of Maryland made Shorb a full research professor. Standing less than five feet tall, Shorb did not like to lecture, although she apparently possessed considerable charisma on a person-to-person level. She chose to work on problems that required a multidisciplinary approach long before that was "fashionable" or common. Thus, she drew graduate students to work in her lab from a number of departments at the university.

Before her retirement in 1972, Shorb and various co-authors published 58 papers in refereed journals as well as "numerous" popular articles. She and her students also presented papers at many, many professional society meetings and symposia.

== Later life ==
Shorb and her husband loved to travel. During her tenure, she requested, and received, a ten-month contract so they could spend the summer traveling. (The fact that the University of Maryland acceded to her desire was just one other sign of the high value they attached to her presence on the faculty.) During their years of traveling, the Shorbs visited 94 countries, every U. S. state, and every Canadian province and territory. They celebrated her retirement by taking over a year to travel, making stops all the way around the world.

She died in August 1990 from complications of pneumonia.

== Honors and awards ==
Shorb received many awards and honors during career as well as afterwards.

In 1949, Shorb and Karl Folkers shared the Mead Johnson Research Award for their work on vitamin B12. That year, Shorb also received the Hematology Research Foundation Award and was recognized as a Distinguished Alumna by the College of Idaho. The college later recognized her as an Outstanding Graduate (1966) and with an honorary Doctor of Science award in 1983.

In 1951, Hood Colleges designated her as an Outstanding Woman of Maryland. In 1957, Shorb received the Sigma Xi Research Award. Thirty years later she was inducted into the Maryland Women's Hall of Fame. She also became a Fellow of the New York Academy of Science and was honored by the American Association of University Women.

Upon her retirement, Merck and associated labs endowed the Shorb Lectureship at the University of Maryland.
