= Wahpeton, North Dakota =

- City
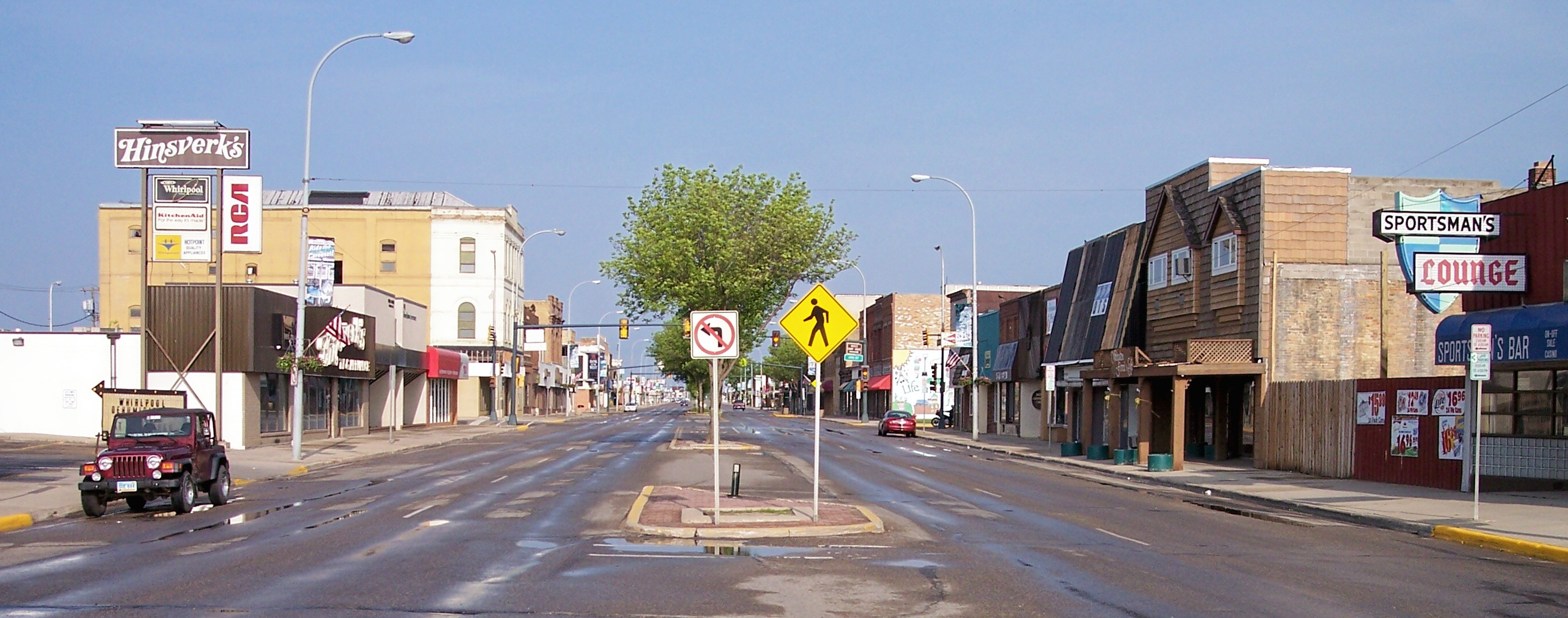
- Dakota Avenue in downtown Wahpeton, 2007

- Flag Seal Logo
- Nickname: Home of the Wahpper
- Interactive map of Wahpeton, North Dakota
- Location within North Dakota
- Coordinates: 46.2721°N 96.6122°W
- Country: United States
- State: North Dakota
- County: Richland
- Settled: 1864
- Founded: 1869
- Incorporated (town): 1882
- Incorporated (city): 1887

Government
  - Mayor: Brett Lambrecht
  - Councilmembers: Steve Dale; Jason Goltz; Tiana Bohn; David Woods, II
  - At Large: Shannon Schillinger; Casey Formaneck; Bob Ostmo; Jay Julson

Area
  - City: 5.355 sq mi (13.870 km^{2})
  - Land: 5.355 sq mi (13.870 km^{2})
  - Water: 0 sq mi (0.000 km^{2}) 0.00%
- Elevation: 965 ft (294 m)

Population (2020)
  - City: 8,007
  - Estimate (2025): 8,141
  - Density: 1,495/sq mi (577.3/km^{2})
  - Urban: 11,290
  - Metro: 23,019 (US: 488th)
- Time zone: UTC–6 (Central (CST))
  - Summer (DST): UTC–5 (CDT)
- ZIP Codes: 58074, 58075, 58076
- Area code: 701
- FIPS code: 38-82660
- GNIS feature ID: 1036311
- Highways: ND 13, ND 210, ND 127
- Website: wahpeton.com

Wahpeton (/ˈwɑːpɪtən/ WAH-pit-ən) is a city in and the county seat of Richland County, North Dakota, United States. Along the Bois de Sioux River at its confluence with the Otter Tail River, which forms the Red River of the North. The population was 8,007 as of the 2020 census, and was estimated at 8,141 in 2025, making it the 10th most populous city in North Dakota.

The North Dakota State College of Science is in Wahpeton. The local newspaper is the Wahpeton Daily News. Wahpeton is also home to the Chahinkapa Zoo, the first zoo built in North Dakota.

== History ==
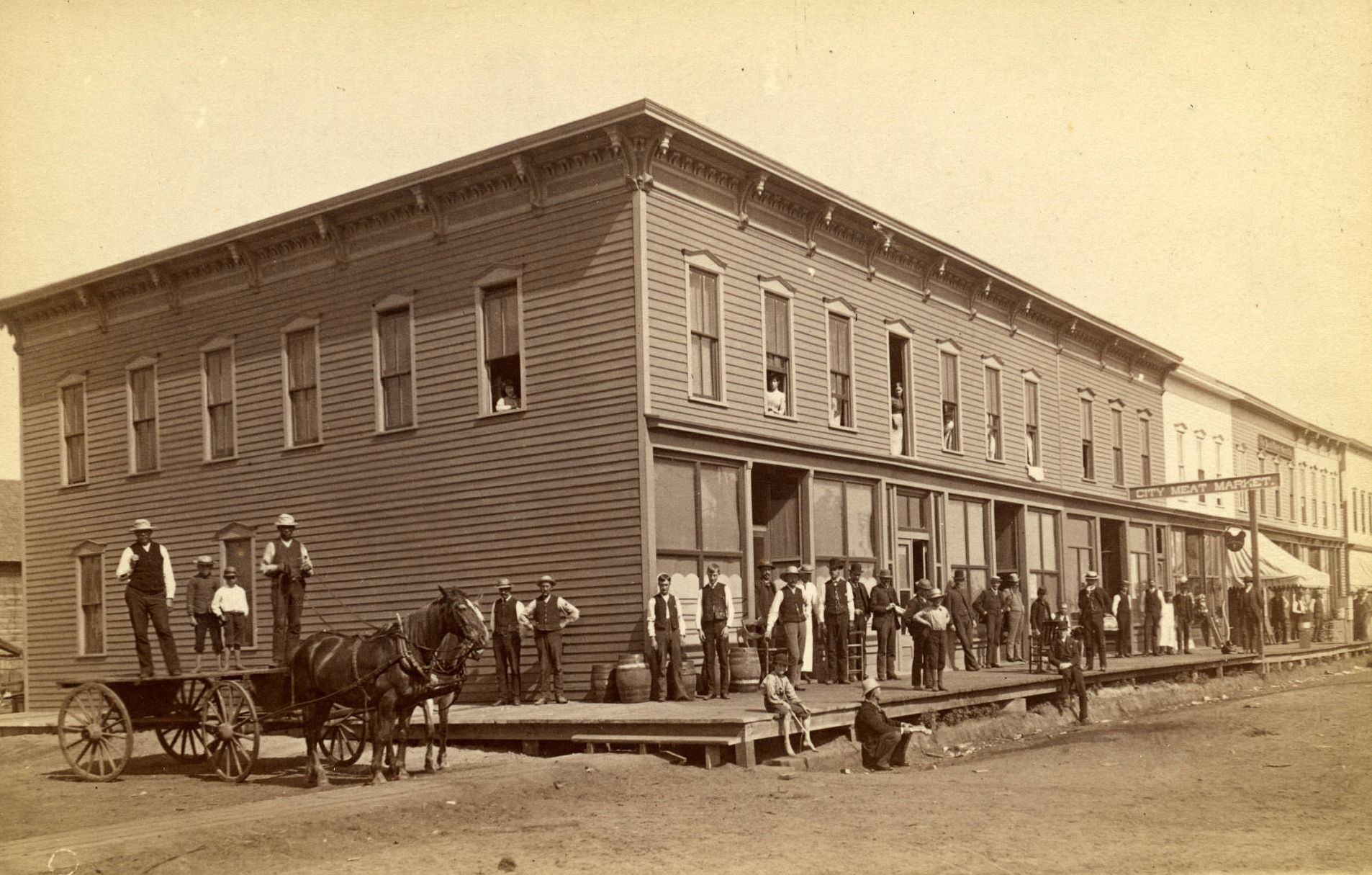
Merchants Hotel in Wahpeton, North Dakota, c. 1880–1899

Wahpeton was founded in 1869 and is the principal city of the Wahpeton Micropolitan Statistical Area, which includes all of Richland County, North Dakota and Wilkin County, Minnesota. Wahpeton's twin city is Breckenridge, Minnesota, on the other side of the river. The Bois de Sioux River and the Otter Tail River join at Wahpeton and Breckenridge to form the Red River of the North.

The first European explorer in the area was Jonathan Carver in 1767. He explored and mapped the Northwest at the request of Major Robert Rogers, commander of Fort Michilimackinac. This British fort at Mackinaw City, Michigan, protected the passage between Lake Michigan and Lake Huron of the Great Lakes. In 1763 the British had extended their reach in Canada and territory west of the Appalachian Mountains, taking over former French colonial territories after defeating the French in the Seven Years' War.

Carver's mission was to find the Northwest Passage, the imagined waterway to the Orient which Rogers (and many other explorers of the time) believed existed. Carver could not find what does not exist, but his account of exploration helped attract fur traders and other explorers to this territory.

More than 100 years after Carver's expedition, a U.S. government surveying party passed through the Wahpeton area. With the Civil War over, the government wanted to encourage development in the West. J. W. Blanding, a member of the expedition, was so impressed by the fertile river valley that he returned to his Wisconsin home determined to move his family and property to the Dakota Territory. Blanding so influenced other Wisconsin settlers that many had reached the Wahpeton area and homesteaded there before Blanding arranged his return.

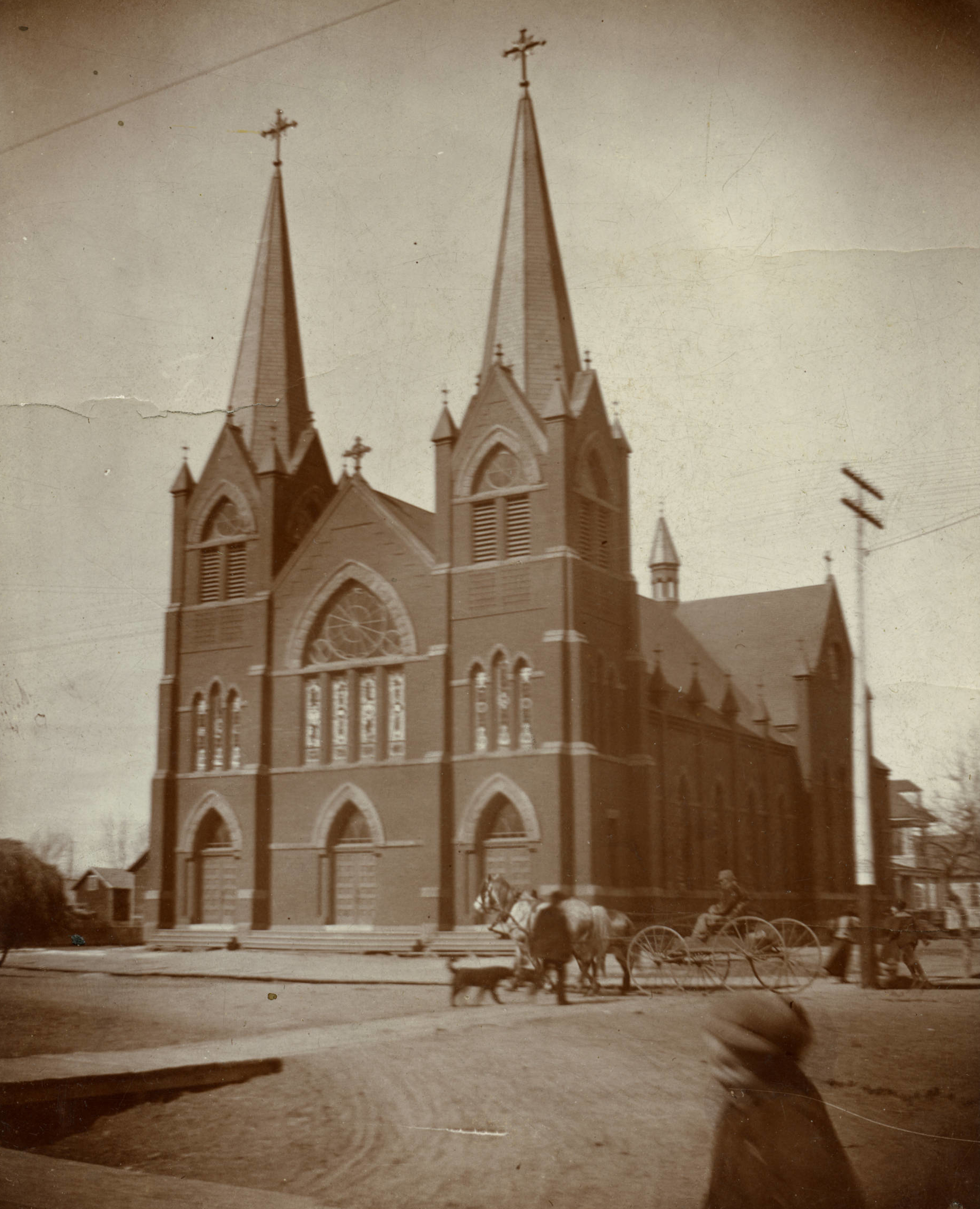
St. John's Catholic Church in Wahpeton, North Dakota, 1898

The first settler was Morgan T. Rich. His plow turned the first furrow of rich black bottomland in 1869. When other settlers arrived, they formed a tiny community and named it Richville, commemorating both its founder and the fertile quality of the soil.

In 1871, a U.S. post office opened. At the same time, the town's name was changed to Chahinkapa, a Lakota Sioux word meaning "the end of the woods". Two years later, the county was organized and named Chahinkapa County.

Later that year the county was renamed Richland County and the town of Chahinkapa renamed Wahpeton. This was derived from the Dakota name of the local band of Dakota Indians, the Wahpetuwan. The name in Dakota means "leaf dwellers." They adopted this name at an earlier time when they lived in the vicinity of Lake Mille Lacs, before they were displaced by the Ojibwe and pushed to the west.

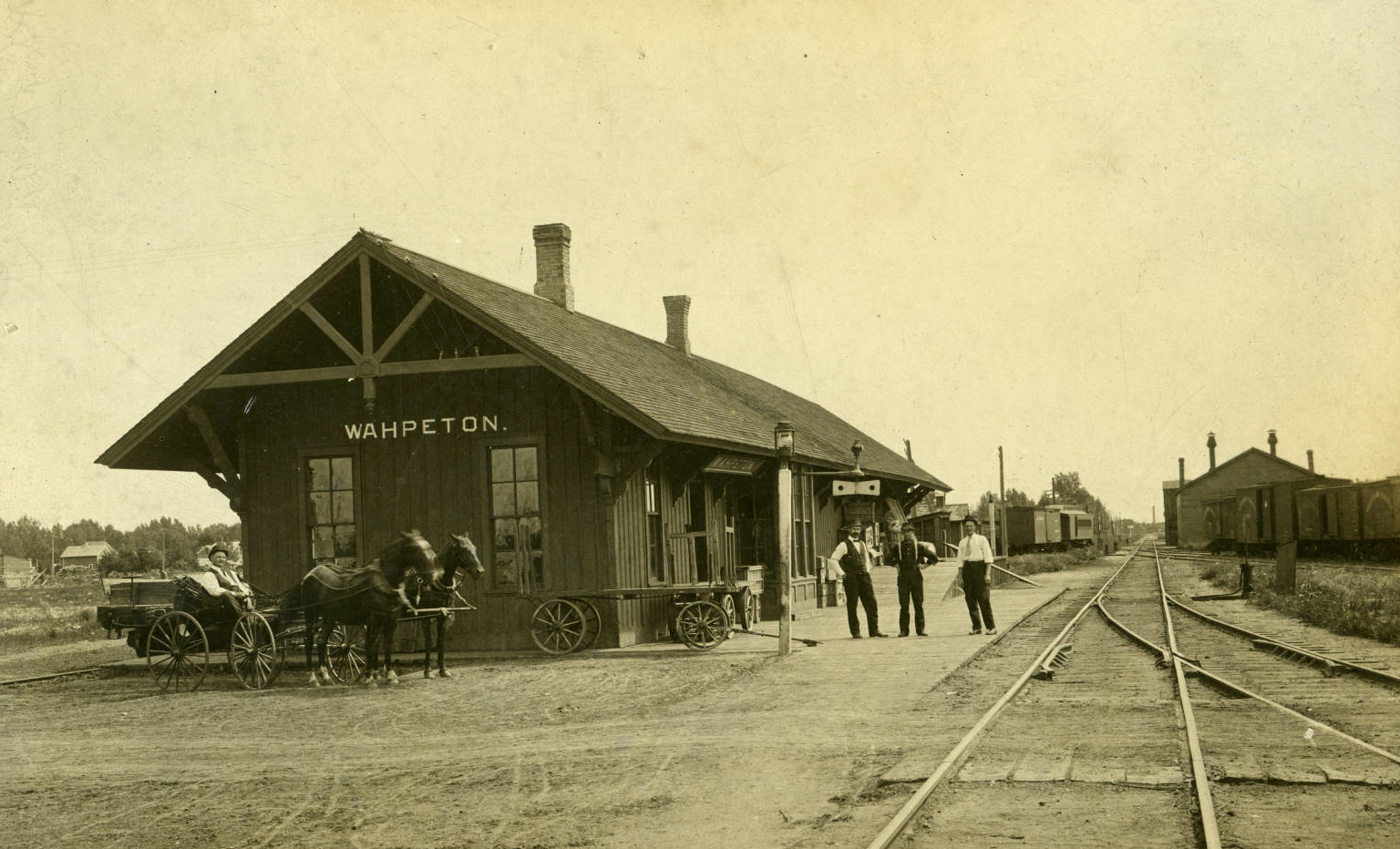
Northern Pacific Depot in Wahpeton, North Dakota, 1880s

Growth of the village of Wahpeton was quite slow during the first few years, but it increased rapidly in 1872 with the completion of a railroad line into Breckenridge, Minnesota, a tiny community across the Bois de Sioux River. The St. Paul and Pacific Railway (now the Great Northern) had entered the region. The railroad generated a booming business in flatboat building in both communities. Flatboats could carry freight directly from the railroad downriver via the Red River of the North (which flowed north) to northern parts of the state and to Winnipeg, Manitoba, Canada.

The railroad line attracted many more settlers to the area—both migrants from the Eastern United States, Native Americans, and new European immigrants. Germans, Bohemians, Scandinavians, and Native Americans moved to Richland County to file for homesteads. In 1874, Jacob Morvin and Joseph Sittarich opened the county's first retail store in Wahpeton. By 1876 the traffic between Wahpeton and Breckenridge had grown past the ferry's capacity. A bridge was built across the Bois de Sioux River connecting the towns.

Another flurry of growth occurred in 1880 when the St. Paul, Minneapolis, and Manitoba Railroad crossed the river and pushed its tracks on toward the northwest. By 1883 the population of Wahpeton was estimated to be as high as 1,400 people.

In 1888, the Northern Light Electric Company (NLEC) was organized here. It made Wahpeton among North Dakota's first cities to be electrified. In 1909, NLEC became the first customer of the newly founded Otter Tail Power Company. In 1913, NLEC's owner, C. B. Kidder, sold his company to Otter Tail Power and became its first general manager. In 1927, Otter Tail Power built what was then its largest power plant at Wahpeton, naming it Kidder Station. The plant was removed in 1977; the site is now a park.

In 1889, the Red River Valley University was established in Wahpeton. It later was renamed the North Dakota State College of Science.

On June 10, 1897, a lightning bolt struck the main pole in a Ringling Brothers Circus tent as it was being erected, breaking the pole and causing three deaths. The lives lost are commemorated with a monument in a graveyard south of Wahpeton.

In 1904, the U.S. government established the Wahpeton Indian School here. The boarding school operated into the 1970s. It was intended to educate Native American children from reservations and tribes in northern Minnesota, North Dakota, and northern South Dakota. It was an Indian boarding school, designed to assimilate the children to mainstream language, culture and religion. In most such schools, children were required to use English rather than their native languages (which were many among these groups), dress in Euro-American style, and practice Christianity. The school has since been transferred to an inter-tribal group, chartered under the federally recognized Sisseton-Wahpeton Dakota Oyate and funded by the Bureau of Indian Education. The tribes renamed the school Circle of Nations School and operate it, serving children in grades 4–8.

== Geography ==
According to the United States Census Bureau, the city has a total area of 5.355 square miles (13.87 km^{2}), all land.

The Red River forms one of the most fertile river valleys in the world. As it flows north to Canada, it forms the state boundary between North Dakota and Minnesota. Wahpeton is near the river's headwaters at the confluence of the Bois de Sioux and Otter Tail Rivers.

=== Climate ===
This climatic region is typified by large seasonal temperature differences, with warm to hot (and often humid) summers and cold (sometimes severely cold) winters. According to the Köppen Climate Classification system, Wahpeton has a humid continental climate, abbreviated "Dfb" on climate maps.

== Demographics ==
Historical population
Census	Pop.	Note	%±
1880	400		—
1890	1,510		277.5%
1900	2,228		47.5%
1910	2,467		10.7%
1920	3,069		24.4%
1930	3,176		3.5%
1940	3,747		18.0%
1950	5,125		36.8%
1960	5,876		14.7%
1970	7,076		20.4%
1980	9,064		28.1%
1990	8,751		−3.5%
2000	8,586		−1.9%
2010	7,766		−9.6%
2020	8,007		3.1%
2025 (est.)	8,141		1.7%
U.S. Decennial Census; 2020 Census

According to realtor website Zillow, the average price of a home as of June 30, 2026, in Wahpeton was $239,805.

As of the 2024 American Community Survey, there were 3,459 estimated households in Wahpeton with an average of 1.91 persons per household. The city has a median household income of $62,750. Approximately 15.6% of the city's population lives at or below the poverty line. Wahpeton has an estimated 64.2% employment rate, with 23.1% of the population holding a bachelor's degree or higher and 93.3% holding a high school diploma. There were 3,756 housing units at an average density of 701.40 per square mile (270.8/km^{2}).

The top five reported languages (people were allowed to report up to two languages, thus the figures will generally add to more than 100%) were English (96.7%), Spanish (0.7%), Indo-European (1.1%), Asian and Pacific Islander (1.4%), and Other (0.1%).

The median age in the city was 34.7 years.

Wahpeton, North Dakota – racial and ethnic composition Note: the US Census treats Hispanic/Latino as an ethnic category. This table excludes Latinos from the racial categories and assigns them to a separate category. Hispanics/Latinos may be of any race.
Race / ethnicity (NH = non-Hispanic)	Pop. 1980	Pop. 1990	Pop. 2000	Pop. 2010	Pop. 2020
White alone (NH)	8,768 (96.73%)	8,255 (94.33%)	8,142 (94.83%)	7,105 (91.49%)	6,743 (84.21%)
Black or African American alone (NH)	7 (0.08%)	18 (0.21%)	53 (0.62%)	98 (1.26%)	131 (1.64%)
Native American or Alaska Native alone (NH)	225 (2.48%)	374 (4.27%)	207 (2.41%)	217 (2.79%)	300 (3.75%)
Asian alone (NH)	14 (0.15%)	66 (0.75%)	37 (0.43%)	61 (0.79%)	102 (1.27%)
Pacific Islander alone (NH)	—	—	3 (0.03%)	5 (0.06%)	15 (0.19%)
Other race alone (NH)	0 (0.00%)	2 (0.02%)	3 (0.03%)	7 (0.09%)	16 (0.20%)
Mixed race or multiracial (NH)	—	—	76 (0.89%)	117 (1.51%)	318 (3.97%)
Hispanic or Latino (any race)	50 (0.55%)	36 (0.41%)	65 (0.76%)	156 (2.01%)	382 (4.77%)
Total	9,064 (100.00%)	8,751 (100.00%)	8,586 (100.00%)	7,766 (100.00%)	8,007 (100.00%)

=== 2020 census ===
As of the 2020 census, there were 8,007 people, 3,235 households, and 1,736 families residing in the city. The population density was 1,535.38 inhabitants per square mile (592.8/km^{2}). There were 3,597 housing units at an average density of 689.74 per square mile (266.3/km^{2}). The racial makeup of the city was 85.59% White, 1.64% African American, 4.17% Native American, 1.34% Asian, 0.22% Pacific Islander, 2.19% from some other races and 4.86% from two or more races. Hispanic or Latino people of any race were 4.77% of the population.

There were 3,235 households out of which 25.3% had children under the age of 18 living with them, 37.9% were married couples living together, 27.3% had a female householder with no husband present, and _% were non-families. 38.6% of all households were made up of individuals and 13.6% had someone living alone who was 65 years of age or older. The average household size was 2._ and the average family size was 2._.

In the city the population was spread out with _% were under 5 years of age, 20.6% under the age of 18, _% from 18 to 24, _% from 25 to 44, _% from 45 to 64, and 17.2% who were 65 years of age or older. The median age was 33.3 years. For every 100 females there were 106.3 males. For every 100 females age 18 and over, there were 103.5 males.

The median income for a household in the city was $_, and the median income for a family was $_. Males had a median income of $_ versus $_ for females. The per capita income for the city was $_. _% of the population and _% of families were below the poverty line. Out of the total people living in poverty, _% were under the age of 18 and _% were 65 or older.

98.7% of residents lived in urban areas, while 1.3% lived in rural areas.

25.8% were households with a male householder and no spouse or partner present.

There were 3,597 housing units, of which 10.1% were vacant. The homeowner vacancy rate was 1.6% and the rental vacancy rate was 13.0%.

=== 2010 census ===
As of the 2010 census, there were 7,766 people, 3,151 households, and 1,717 families residing in the city. The population density was 1,467.50 inhabitants per square mile (566.6/km^{2}). There were 3,482 housing units at an average density of 657.97 inhabitants per square mile (254.0/km^{2}). The racial makeup of the city was 92.65% White, 1.26% African American, 3.08% Native American, 0.78% Asian, 0.09% Pacific Islander, 0.35% from some other races, and 1.79% from two or more races. Hispanic or Latino people of any race were 2.01% of the population.

There were 3,151 households, of which 26.8% had children under age 18 living with them, 40.7% were married couples living together, 9.2% had a female householder with no husband present, 4.6% had a male householder with no wife present, and 45.5% were non-families. 36.3% of all households were made up of individuals, and 11.7% had someone living alone who was 65 or older. The average household size was 2.17 and the average family size was 2.89.

The median age in the city was 31.1. 20.3% of residents were under 18; 22.2% were between 18 and 24; 20.5% were from 25 to 44; 24.5% were from 45 to 64; and 12.6% were 65 or older. The gender makeup of the city was 51.6% male and 48.4% female.

=== 2000 census ===
As of the 2000 census, there were 8,586 people, 3,254 households, and 1,867 families residing in the city. The population density was 1,718.1 inhabitants per square mile (663.4/km^{2}). There were 3,492 housing units at an average density of 698.8 inhabitants per square mile (269.8/km^{2}). The racial makeup of the city was 95.47% White, 0.62% African American, 2.41% Native American, 0.43% Asian, 0.03% Pacific Islander, 0.12% from some other races, and 0.92% from two or more races. Hispanic or Latino people of any race were 0.76% of the population.

The top six ancestry groups in the city are German (47.4%), Norwegian (28.4%), Irish (7.1%), Swedish (5.8%), French (4.0%), English (4.0%).

There were 3,254 households, of which 30.4% had children under 18 living with them, 45.3% were married couples living together, 8.5% had a female householder with no husband present, and 42.6% were non-families. 32.7% of all households were made up of individuals, and 10.0% had someone living alone who was 65 or older. The average household size was 2.28 and the average family size was 2.97.

In the city, the population was spread out, with 21.2% under 18, 24.1% from 18 to 24, 24.2% from 25 to 44, 17.5% from 45 to 64, and 13.0% who were 65 or older. The median age was 29. For every 100 females, there were 109.8 males. For every 100 females 18 and over, there were 112.3 males.

The median income for a household in the city was $33,471, and the median income for a family was $44,645. Males had a median income of $30,199 versus $20,089 for females. The per capita income for the city was $15,293. About 7.3% of families and 13.4% of the population were below the poverty line, including 8.9% of those under 18 and 10.4% of those 65 or older.

== Economy ==
Wahpeton is the home of several large manufacturing plants, including Woodcraft Industries, Inc., WCCO Belting, Minn-Dak Farmers Cooperative, Cargill, ComDel Innovation, Heartland Precision, Doosan/Bobcat, Masonite and Wil-Rich.

Imation Corporation operated a production facility in Wahpeton but it closed in 2009.

On May 14, 1991, City of Wahpeton voters approved a 1% city sales and use tax, the proceeds of which are to be dedicated solely to economic development of the City of Wahpeton. On June 14, 1994, voters approved to extend the sales tax 10 years to June 30, 2006. And again on October 14, 2003, voters approved broadening the use and extending the 1½% sales tax to June 30, 2026 ensuring planned economic growth for years to come. In 2009, city voters once again were asked to set aside an additional ½ cent for continued flood protection and city infrastructure projects.

Effective October 1, 2025, City of Wahpeton Sales, Use & Gross Receipts Tax:

- 8% local city (sales, use, and gross receipts)
- 9% restaurant
- 10% alcoholic beverages
- 11% lodging

History of Sale Tax Rates:

- 5.0% before July 1, 1991
- 6.0% July 1, 1991
- 6.5% October 1, 1999
- 7.0% January 1, 2010
- 8.0% October 1, 2025

== Recreation and culture ==
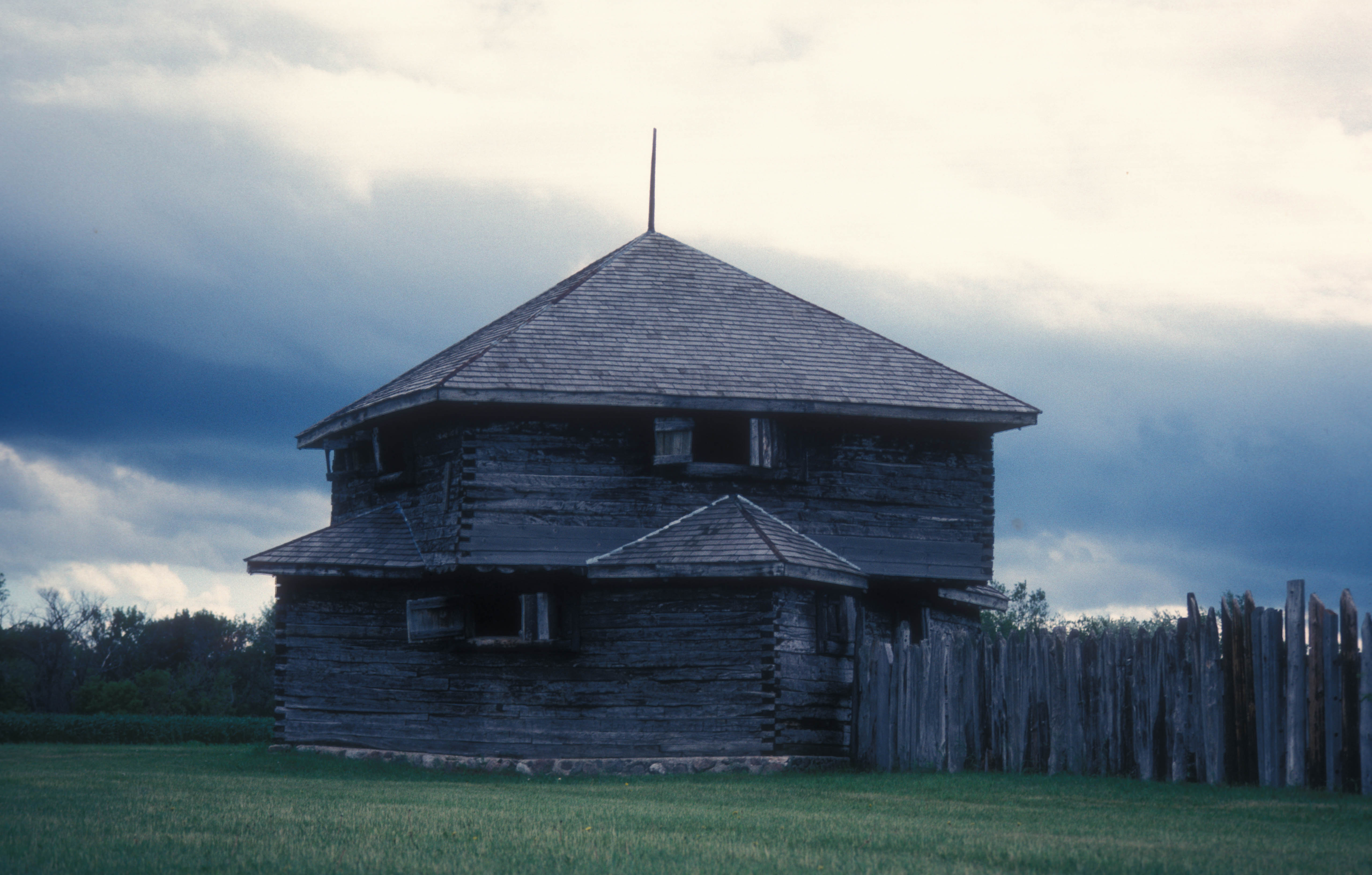
Photo of Fort Abercrombie

The area attracts outdoorsmen and hunters, as it is in the midst of the Central Flyway, thus providing excellent migratory waterfowl hunting.

The Bois de Sioux Golf Course is the nation's only golf course with half the course in one state and half in another. Near the golf course is Chahinkapa Park, which houses playgrounds, baseball, softball, football fields, and tennis. During the summer the large swimming pool is open. Chahinkapa Park is also home to Chahinkapa Zoo. In May 2018, Chahinkapa Zoo became home to two white rhinos.

The Richland County Historical Society Museum features Native American artifacts and displays of pioneer life. Near Wahpeton is Fort Abercrombie and the Circus Monument, erected in memory of circus workers killed by lightning there in 1897. Circus performers hold a memorial service at the monument whenever they perform in the area.

The Carmelite Monastery, in the bend of the Wild Rice River, is a few miles from Wahpeton.

On Thursday afternoons from June through October, the Twin Towns Gardeners' Market is held near the Sears/Family Dollar building in Wahpeton.

Other Wahpeton area attractions include "Wahpper" the World's Largest Catfish, at Kidder Dam, and the Bagg Bonanza Farm, a 15-acre (61,000 m^{2}) historic bonanza farm with farm buildings and machinery. There is a mural at the corner of Dakota Avenue and 4th Street. Also downtown is the Red Door Art Gallery/Visitor Center.

== Education ==
=== Colleges ===
- North Dakota State College of Science

=== K–12 ===
Wahpeton is served by four elementary schools, Zimmerman Elementary School, Wahpeton Elementary School, Wahpeton Middle School and Wahpeton Senior High School. There is also a private school, St. John's Elementary.

The Circle of Nations School (formerly Wahpeton Indian School), an off-reservation tribal boarding school for Native American children in grades 4 to 8, is affiliated with the Bureau of Indian Education (BIE).

High school championships

- State Class 'A' football: 1930, 1971
- State Class 'A' boys basketball: 1941, 1944, 1954, 1979
- State Class 'A' girls basketball: 1986
- State Class 'A' volleyball: 1985, 1986
- State Class 'A' girls golf: 1991
- State Class 'A' wrestling: 2007
- State Class 'A' girls indoor track and field: 1999

== Transportation ==
Wahpeton has two railroads, a bus line, five truck lines, and an airport with runways approximately 3,000 and 5,000 feet (1,500 m) in length.

=== Transit ===
Valley Senior Services provides dial-a-ride transit service to residents of Wahpeton on weekdays.

=== Main Highways and Roads ===
- ND 13
- ND 127
- ND 210 (works as a bypass for Wahpeton. Crosses the river just north of Breckenridge, MN, becomes MN 210 and then intersects US 75.

== Notable people ==
- Art Anderson (1936–2021), National Football League offensive tackle
- Sam Anderson (born 1947), actor
- Anna Astvatsaturian Turcotte (born 1978), Armenian-American writer
- Louise Erdrich (born 1954), author and Pulitzer Prize recipient
- Sidney Hinds (1900–1991), U.S. Army brigadier general and Olympic sport shooter
- Rose Thompson Hovick (1890–1954), talent manager and mother depicted in the musical Gypsy
- Woodrow W. Keeble (1917–1982), U.S. Army master sergeant and Medal of Honor recipient
- Colin Masica (1931–2022), linguist
- Porter J. McCumber (1858–1933), U.S. Senator from North Dakota
- Jerome G. Miller (1931–2015), correctional institution reform activist
- Steve Myhra (1934–1994), National Football League placekicker
- William E. Purcell (1856–1928), U.S. Senator from North Dakota
- David Richman (born 1978), North Dakota State University men's basketball coach
- Mary Shaw Shorb (1907–1990), biologist
- Ryan Smith (born 1991), Canadian Football League wide receiver
- Russell T. Thane (1926–2020), North Dakota state senator
- John Wall (1943–2014), North Dakota state representative
- Clark Williams (1942–2020), North Dakota state representative
