= KNDK =

KNDK may refer to:

- KNDK (AM), a radio station (1080 AM) licensed to Langdon, North Dakota, United States
- KLME, a radio station (95.7 FM) licensed to Langdon, North Dakota, which held the call sign KNDK-FM from 1991 to 2021
