= Dresden Township =

Dresden Township may refer to the following places:

- Dresden Township, Chickasaw County, Iowa
- Dresden Township, Decatur County, Kansas
- Dresden Township, Kingman County, Kansas
- Dresden Township, Pettis County, Missouri
- Dresden Township, Cavalier County, North Dakota
  - also South Dresden Township, Cavalier County, North Dakota

== See also ==
- Dresden (disambiguation)
