= Hove (disambiguation) =

Hove is a constituent part of the City of Brighton & Hove in East Sussex, England.

Hove may also refer to:

== People ==
- Chenjerai Hove (1956–2015), Zimbabwean writer
- Fred Van Hove (1937–2022), Belgian jazz musician and a pioneer of European free jazz
- Ivo van Hove (born 1958), Belgian theatre director
- Joachim van den Hove (1567?–1620), Flemish composer
- Léon Van Hove (1924–1990), Belgian physicist
- Martin van den Hove (1605–1639), Dutch astronomer
- Peter van Hove (died 1793), Flemish theologian
- Tinashe Hove (born 1984), Zimbabwean cricketer

=== Middle name ===
- Mathias Hove Johansen (born 1998), Norwegian sprinter

== Places ==
- Hove (UK Parliament constituency)
- Borough of Hove, a district of East Sussex from 1974-1997
- Hove railway station, Hove, England
- Hove, Belgium, a municipality in Belgium
- Hove, Germany, a locality of Jork
- Hove, South Australia, a suburb in Adelaide, Australia
  - Hove railway station, Adelaide
- Hawaiian Ocean View Estates, Hawaii, (HOVE) a real estate development on Hawaiʻi Island now known as Ocean View, Hawaii
- Høve, a village in northwest Zealand

== Other uses ==
- Hove Festival, a music festival in Norway
- Hove, past tense of heave

== See also ==
- Hove Mobile Park, North Dakota, a former city in the United States with two residents
