= David Monson (North Dakota politician) =

American politician (born 1950)

Member of the North Dakota House of Representatives
- Incumbent
- Assumed office 1993
- Constituency: 10th district (1993–2022); 19th district (2022–present)

Personal details
- Born: July 30, 1950 (age 75) Langdon, North Dakota, U.S.
- Party: Republican
- Spouse: Mary K
- Profession: Self Employed Farmer; Retired School Administrator; Retired Insurance Agent/Owner

David C. Monson (born July 30, 1950) is an American politician in the state of North Dakota. He is a member of the North Dakota House of Representatives, representing the 19th district. A Republican, he was first elected in 1992 to represent the 10th district, though now he serves the 19th district with Karen Anderson. An alumnus of North Dakota State University, he is a farmer. He is also a former director of the Osnabrock School Board, Assistant Majority Leader of the House of Representatives, and Speaker of the House of Representatives.
