= KAOC =

Radio station in Cavalier–Langdon, North Dakota, United States

Coordinates: 48.644°N 97.980°W

- Cavalier, North Dakota; United States
- Broadcast area: Langdon—Grafton, ND/Morden—Winkler—Altona, MB
- Frequency: 105.1 MHz
- Branding: Maverick 105

Programming
- Format: Commercial; Country

Ownership
- Owner: Simmons Broadcasting
- Sister stations: KNDK, KLME, KYTZ

Technical information
- Licensing authority: FCC
- Facility ID: 56712
- Class: C1
- ERP: 100,000 watts
- HAAT: 233 meters

Links
- Public license information: Public file; LMS
- Webcast: Listen Live
- Website: www.maverick105fm.com

KAOC (105.1 FM, "Maverick 105") is a radio station broadcasting a country music format. Licensed to Cavalier, North Dakota, it serves Langdon, North Dakota, Grafton, North Dakota, Morden, Manitoba, and Winkler, Manitoba. The station is currently owned by Simmons Broadcasting. All four Simmons Broadcasting stations share studios at 1403 Third Street in Langdon, ND. Canadian studios are at 467 Stephen Street in Morden, Manitoba.

Former logo
