= KAUJ =

- Grafton, North Dakota; United States
- Frequency: 100.9 MHz
- Branding: MyFM 100.9

Programming
- Format: Unknown

Ownership
- Owner: Simmons Broadcasting Inc.
- Sister stations: KXPO

History
- First air date: September 17, 1984
- Former call signs: KXPO-FM (1982–2001)

Technical information
- Licensing authority: FCC
- Facility ID: 34474
- Class: A
- ERP: 3,000 watts
- HAAT: 38 meters
- Transmitter coordinates: 48°23′53″N 97°26′56″W

Links
- Public license information: Public file; LMS

KAUJ (100.9 FM, "MyFM 100.9") is a radio station licensed to serve Grafton, North Dakota. The station is owned by Simmons Broadcasting Inc.

== History ==
In July 2001, KXPO-FM swapped formats and call letters with KAUJ (106.7 FM in Walhalla, North Dakota, now KYTZ). The station was assigned the KAUJ call letters by the Federal Communications Commission on July 2, 2001. KAUJ aired an Oldies format featuring satellite-fed programming from Scott Shannon's The True Oldies Channel from ABC Radio before flipping to Classic Rock in 2014

Sometime in 2021 KAUJ dropped its "Rock Farm" classic rock format (which moved to KYTZ 106.7 Walhalla) and rebranded as "MyFM 100.9" with an unknown format.
