= Grafton State School =

- Grafton State School, North Dakota Developmental Center, Institution for the Feebleminded, Life Skills and Transition Center
- U.S. National Register of Historic Places
- U.S. Historic district
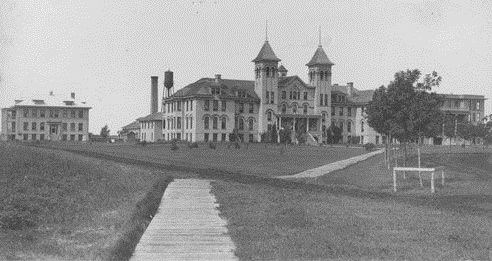

- Location within North Dakota Location within the United States
- Location: 700 6th St., W., Grafton, North Dakota
- Coordinates: 48°25′7″N 97°25′26″W
- Area: 3,427 acres (1,387 ha)
- Built: 1901
- Architect: Hancock Brothers; Joseph Bell DeRemer; Theodore B. Wells
- Architectural style: Prairie School, Beaux Arts, Classical Revival
- NRHP reference No.: 96001191
- Added to NRHP: November 6, 1996

The Grafton State School on 6th St., W., in Grafton, North Dakota was listed on the National Register of Historic Places in 1996.

== History ==
It includes work dating from 1901. It includes Prairie School, Beaux Arts, and Classical Revival architecture. There were six contributing buildings and one other contributing structure—remnants of tunnels connecting the buildings—included in the 3,427 acres (1,387 ha) of the listing. It has also been known as the North Dakota Institution for the Feeble Minded.

It is significant as representing "the official effort of the State of North Dakota to care for its developmentally disabled citizens during the twentieth century, and ... for its association with Dr. Arthur Rufus Trado Wylie (1873-1941), superintendent during 1910-1933 and a leading figure nationally in the care of the developmentally disabled."

Renamed the "State Developmental Center" enacted by the North Dakota Legislature in 1989, another piece of legislation enacted at the same time but did not become effective until January 1, 1991 resulted in a further name change, dropping the "State" from the name to "Developmental Center" - or generally known as the "North Dakota Developmental Center". The agency is a division of the North Dakota Department of Human Services and was administratively merged with the North Dakota State Hospital in April, 2000 under a single superintendent, Alex Schweitzer.

The 2013 Legislature enacted another name change that was effective August 1, 2013 to Life Skills and Transition Center to reflect the changing nature of services by the agency. The 1933 name change, from "Institution for the Feebleminded" to the "Grafton State School", incorporated the educational mission of the agency that was established in the original legislation; the agency opened for residents in May, 1904 and school began in September, 1904. The modern services of the "Life Skills and Transition Center", an agency of the North Dakota Department of Human Services, includes adult Intermediate Care Facility for Individuals with Developmental Disability (ICF/IDD), youth ICF/IDD, Home and Community Based Services in-home and day support services, mobile Adaptive Equipment Services, Developmental Disabilities Behavioral Health Services of behavior analysis consultation, CARES Clinic healthcare services, and the CARES outreach service.
