= Cavalier County Museum =

Open air museum in North Dakota, US

Coordinates: 48°49′31″N 98°28′53″W

The Cavalier County Museum is an open air museum located in Dresden, North Dakota.

== History ==
The village of Dresden was founded in 1897 between Langdon and the Canadian border. Its population peaked in 1920 with around 250 residents, but this had fallen to around 20 people by 1970.

The Cavalier County Museum opened in Dresden in the late 1960s and was operated by the county's historical society.

In 1989, the museum consisted of seven buildings and plans were made to purchase the village's former post office.

== Buildings and collection ==
The museum's collections are held within various buildings of the old village. As of June 1989, they were:

- The Holy Trinity Catholic Church, originally built in 1937 and constructed with local fieldstone. The building replaced the former church following its destruction in a fire the previous year. It was dedicated on May 23, 1937.
- The Dyer School was a one-room schoolhouse, originally located five miles northeast of Milton, North Dakota.
- A one-room schoolhouse that has been turned into a library. During the 1980s, it functioned as the election polling place for South Dresden Township.
- A caboose from the Burlington Northern Railroad. It was donated by the railroad in 1985.
- A steel building filled with items related to Cavalier County history. It was built in 1975.
- A cook car from the early twentieth century.
