= WPA architecture =

WPA architecture may refer to:

- PWA/WPA Moderne architecture
- WPA Rustic architecture
