= Alsen, North Dakota =

- City
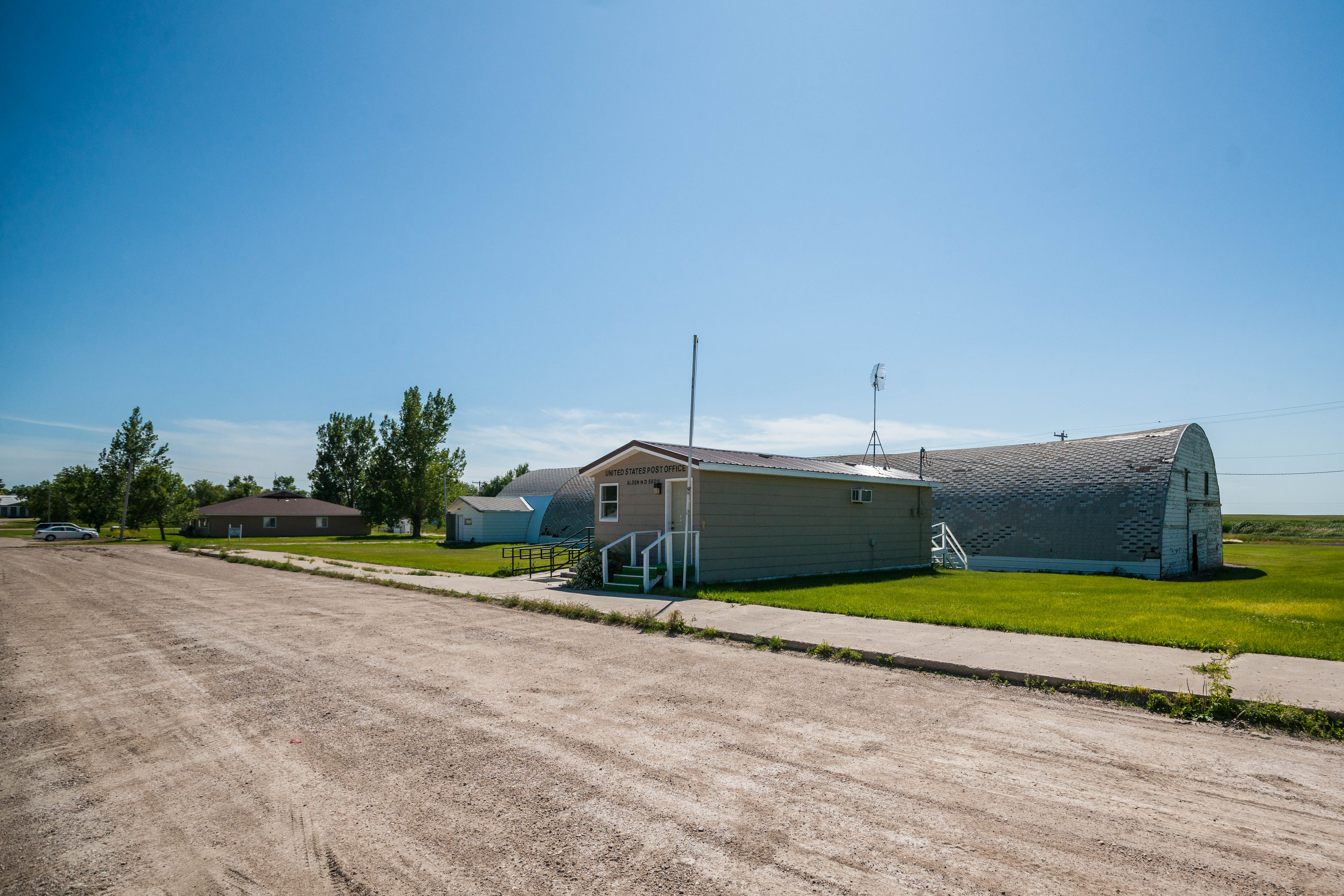
- Post office in Alsen (July 2009)
- Interactive map of Alsen, North Dakota
- Location within North Dakota
- Coordinates: 48.6305°N 98.7043°W
- Country: United States
- State: North Dakota
- County: Cavalier
- Founded: 1905
- Incorporated (village): October 16, 1920
- Incorporated (city): July 1, 1967

Area
  - Total: 29.877 sq mi (77.381 km^{2})
  - Land: 29.355 sq mi (76.029 km^{2})
  - Water: 0.522 sq mi (1.353 km^{2}) 1.75%
- Elevation: 1,581 ft (482 m)

Population (2020)
  - Total: 32
  - Estimate (2025): 29
  - Density: 1.1/sq mi (0.42/km^{2})
- Time zone: UTC–6 (Central (CST))
  - Summer (DST): UTC–5 (CDT)
- ZIP Code: 58311
- Area code: 701
- FIPS code: 38-01740
- GNIS feature ID: 1035906

Alsen is a city in Cavalier County, North Dakota, United States. The population was 32 as of the 2020 census, and was estimated at 29 in 2025.

== History ==
Alsen was founded in 1905. Alsen was incorporated as a village on October 16, 1920 and as a city on July 1, 1967.

== Geography ==
Alsen is located on State Route 66, approximately 8 miles (13 km) west of Loma.

According to the United States Census Bureau, the city has a total area of 29.877 square miles (77.38 km^{2}), of which 29.355 square miles (76.03 km^{2}) is land and 0.522 square miles (1.35 km^{2}) (1.75%) is water.

== Demographics ==
Historical population
Census	Pop.	Note	%±
1930	358		—
1940	312		−12.8%
1950	114		−63.5%
1960	228		100.0%
1970	201		−11.8%
1980	169		−15.9%
1990	113		−33.1%
2000	68		−39.8%
2010	35		−48.5%
2020	32		−8.6%
2025 (est.)	29		−9.4%
U.S. Decennial Census; 2020 Census

=== 2020 census ===
As of the 2020 census, there were 32 people, 14 households, and 10 families residing in the city. The population density was 1.09 inhabitants per square mile (0.4/km^{2}). There were 21 housing units at an average density of 0.72 per square mile (0.3/km^{2}). The racial makeup of the city was 90.63% White, 0.00% African American, 0.00% Native American, 3.13% Asian, 0.00% Pacific Islander, 3.13% from some other races and 3.13% from two or more races. Hispanic or Latino people of any race were 3.13% of the population.

=== 2010 census ===
As of the 2010 census, there were 35 people, 16 households, and 11 families residing in the city. The population density was 1.19 inhabitants per square mile (0.5/km^{2}). There were 28 housing units at an average density of 0.95 per square mile (0.4/km^{2}). The racial makeup of the city was 100.00% White.

There were 16 households, of which 31.3% had children under the age of 18 living with them, 56.3% were married couples living together, 6.3% had a female householder with no husband present, 6.3% had a male householder with no wife present, and 31.3% were non-families. 25.0% of all households were made up of individuals, and 12.6% had someone living alone who was 65 years of age or older. The average household size was 2.19 and the average family size was 2.64.

The median age in the city was 50.8 years. 22.9% of residents were under the age of 18; 0.0% were between the ages of 18 and 24; 17.2% were from 25 to 44; 25.7% were from 45 to 64; and 34.3% were 65 years of age or older. The gender makeup of the city was 54.3% male and 45.7% female.

=== 2000 census ===
As of the 2000 census, there were 68 people, 25 households, and 19 families residing in the city. The population density was 2.32 inhabitants per square mile (0.9/km^{2}). There were 45 housing units at an average density of 1.53 per square mile (0.6/km^{2}). The racial makeup of the city was 97.06% White and 2.94% from two or more races. Hispanic or Latino people of any race were 1.47% of the population.

There were 25 households, out of which 32.0% had children under the age of 18 living with them, 64.0% were married couples living together, 8.0% had a female householder with no husband present, and 24.0% were non-families. 20.0% of all households were made up of individuals, and 12.0% had someone living alone who was 65 years of age or older. The average household size was 2.72 and the average family size was 3.21.

In the city, the population was spread out, with 32.4% under the age of 18, 2.9% from 18 to 24, 27.9% from 25 to 44, 23.5% from 45 to 64, and 13.2% who were 65 years of age or older. The median age was 41 years. For every 100 females, there were 106.1 males. For every 100 females age 18 and over, there were 100.0 males.

The median income for a household in the city was $57,500, and the median income for a family was $65,000. Males had a median income of $51,250 versus $41,250 for females. The per capita income for the city was $12,982. There were 22.7% of families and 44.2% of the population living below the poverty line, including 70.6% of under eighteens and 28.6% of those over 64.

== Education ==
The former high school in Alsen, which closed due to low enrollment in 1980, recorded the longest basketball winning streak in North Dakota basketball history, at 79 games from 1956 to 1959. Alsen High School won the North Dakota Class C state championship in both 1957 and 1958, being undefeated both years.
