= Lake Bronson Site =

- U.S. National Register of Historic Places
- Location within Minnesota Location within the United States
- Location: Southern side of County Road 10 at Lake Bronson, near Lake Bronson, Minnesota (NRIS lists the site as "address restricted".)
- Coordinates: 48°43′0″N 96°37′45″W
- Area: 50 acres (20 ha)
- NRHP reference No.: 78001549
- Added to NRHP: May 22, 1978

The Lake Bronson Site is an archeological site which is listed on the National Register of Historic Places in Kittson County, Minnesota, United States. It includes Middle Woodland period burial mounds and the area of a Middle/Late Woodland seasonal bison-hunting village. It was studied extensively prior to a 1978 realignment of Kittson County Highway 10 near Lake Bronson State Park.
