= Dresden (disambiguation) =

Dresden is the capital city of the German Federal Free State of Saxony.

Dresden may also refer to:

== Places ==
=== United States ===
- Dresden, Kansas, city
- Dresden, Maine, town
- Dresden, Missouri, unincorporated community
- Dresden, Perry County, Missouri, abandoned village
- Dresden, Washington County, New York, a town
- Dresden, Yates County, New York, a village
- Dresden, North Dakota, unincorporated community
- Dresden, Ohio, village
- Dresden Plant, a natural gas power plant in Ohio
- Dresden, Tennessee, town
- Dresden Generating Station, a nuclear power plant in Illinois

=== Other places ===
- Dresden, Ontario, Canada
- Dresden (region), Free State of Saxony, Germany
- Dresden, Staffordshire, England

== Media ==
- Dresden (1946 film), a 1946 East-German film
- Dresden (2006 film), a 2006 television film directed by Roland Suso Richter
- Dresden (album), a 2009 album by Jan Garbarek
- Drezden (band), a Belarusian electronic band founded by Siarhei Mikhalok
- "Dresden", a 2013 song by Orchestral Manoeuvres in the Dark from the album English Electric

== People ==
- Arnold Dresden (1882–1954), Dutch-American mathematician
- Dave Dresden (born 1969), progressive house DJ from San Francisco and one half of DJ duo Gabriel & Dresden
- Harry Dresden, a character in The Dresden Files series
- Max Dresden (1918–1997), Dutch-American theoretical physicist and historian of physics

== Vessels ==
- SMS Dresden (1907), a German light cruiser, scuttled in 1915
- SMS Dresden (1917), a German light cruiser, scuttled in 1919
- USS Zeppelin (1914), renamed Dresden in 1927
- SS Dresden, a list of ships

== Other uses ==
- Bombing of Dresden, attack on the city of Dresden, Germany
- Dresden Codex, a Mayan astrology book
- Dresden Porcelain, a porcelain factory in Freital, near Dresden
  - Dresden, a term sometimes used to mean European porcelain
- Dresden United F.C. an English football club, active in the 1890s
- A 1939 meteorite fall in Ontario, Canada
