= Clyde, North Dakota =

- Unincorporated community
- Location within North Dakota Location within the United States
- Coordinates: 48°46′12″N 98°53′56″W
- Country: United States
- State: North Dakota
- County: Cavalier
- Elevation: 1,618 ft (493 m)

Population (2002)
  - Total: 6
- Time zone: Central (CST)
- ZIP code: 58352
- Area code: 701
- GNIS feature ID: 1028401

Clyde is an unincorporated community in Cavalier County, North Dakota, United States. Clyde reportedly had a population of six residents as of 2002, and is sometimes considered to be a ghost town.

== History ==
Clyde was laid out in 1905, and named after the River Clyde, in Scotland, the native land of a share of the early settlers. A post office called Clyde was established in 1905, and remained in operation until 1965. The population was 150 in 1940.
