= Hove Mobile Park, North Dakota =

- Unincorporated community
- Interactive map of Hove Mobile Park, North Dakota
- Location within North Dakota
- Coordinates: 48°34′57″N 98°13′46″W
- Country: United States
- State: North Dakota
- County: Cavalier
- Incorporated: March 7, 1972
- Dissolved: July 19, 2002

Area
  - Total: 0.038 sq mi (0.098 km^{2})
  - Land: 0.038 sq mi (0.098 km^{2})
  - Water: 0 sq mi (0.000 km^{2}) 0.00%
- Elevation: 1,647 ft (502 m)

Population (2000)
  - Total: 2
  - Density: 53/sq mi (20/km^{2})
- Time zone: UTC–6 (Central (CST))
  - Summer (DST): UTC–5 (CDT)
- ZIP Code: 58229
- Area code: 701
- FIPS code: 38-38980
- GNIS feature ID: 1036096

Hove Mobile Park is a former city in Cavalier County, North Dakota, United States. The population was 2 as of the 2000 census. According to the United States Census Bureau it was one of only five places in the United States with a population of two people. The others were Twombly, Maine; Success, New Hampshire; Oil Springs Reservation, Cattaraugus County, New York; and Monowi, Nebraska. The city government of Hove Mobile Park was dissolved in 2002.

== Geography ==
According to the United States Census Bureau, the city has a total area of 0.038 square miles (0.10 km^{2}), all land.

Hove Mobile Park is located:

- 18 miles southeast of Langdon
- 63 miles northeast of Devils Lake

== Demographics ==
Historical population
Census	Pop.	Note	%±
1980	3		—
1990	2		−33.3%
2000	2		0.0%
U.S. Decennial Census; 2020 Census

=== 2000 census ===
As of the 2000 census, there were 2 people, 1 household, and 1 family residing in the city. The population density was 52.14 inhabitants per square mile (20.13/km^{2}). There were 1 housing unit at an average density of 26.07 per square mile (10.07/km^{2}). The racial makeup of the city was 100.00% White, 0.00% African American, 0.00% Native American, 0.00% Asian, 0.00% Pacific Islander, 0.00% from some other races and 0.00% from two or more races. Hispanic or Latino people of any race were 0.00% of the population.

There were 1 household, out of which 0.0% had children under the age of 18 living with them, 100.0% were married couples living together, 0.0% had a female householder with no husband present, and 0.0% were non-families. 0.0% of all households were made up of individuals, and 0.0% had someone living alone who was 65 years of age or older. The average household size was 2.00 and the average family size was 2.00.

In the city, the population was spread out, with 0.0% under the age of 18, 0.0% from 18 to 24, 0.0% from 25 to 44, 0.0% from 45 to 64, and 100.0% who were 65 years of age or older. The median age was 74 years. For every 100 females, there were 100.0 males. For every 100 females age 18 and over, there were 100.0 males.

The median income for a household in the city was $0, and the median income for a family was $0. Males had a median income of $0 versus $0 for females. The per capita income for the city was $0. About 0.0% of families and 0.0% of the population were below the poverty line, including 0.0% of those under age 18 and 100.0% of those age 65 or over.

=== 1990 census ===
As of the 1990 census, there were 2 people, 1 household, and 1 family residing in the city. The population density was 52.14 inhabitants per square mile (20.13/km^{2}). There were 1 housing unit at an average density of 26.07 per square mile (10.07/km^{2}). The racial makeup of the city was 100.00% White.

=== 1980 census ===
As of the 1980 census, there were 3 people, 1 household, and 1 family residing in the city. The population density was 52.14 inhabitants per square mile (20.13/km^{2}). There were 1 housing unit at an average density of 26.07 per square mile (10.07/km^{2}). The racial makeup of the city was 100.00% White.
