= William E. Gorder =

American politician, teacher, and farmer

Member of the North Dakota House of Representatives from the 16th district
- In office 1991–2000

Personal details
- Born: March 21, 1929 Grafton, North Dakota, U.S.
- Died: August 3, 2017 (aged 88) Grafton, North Dakota, U.S.
- Party: Republican
- Profession: farmer, educator

William E. Gorder (March 21, 1929 – August 3, 2017), was an American politician, teacher, and farmer.

Gorder was born in Grafton, North Dakota. He served in the United States Army during the Korean War. Gorder received his bachelor's and master's degrees from University of North Dakota. Gorder taught in high schools in Minto, North Dakota and Karlstad, Minnesota. He served on the Walsh County, North Dakota Board of Commissioners and was a Republican. He also served in the North Dakota House of Representatives from 1979 to 1984 and from 1991 to 2000. Gorder died at the Lutheran Sunset Home in Grafton, North Dakota.
