= Riggs-Hamilton American Legion Post No. 20 =

- U.S. National Register of Historic Places
- U.S. Historic district – Contributing property
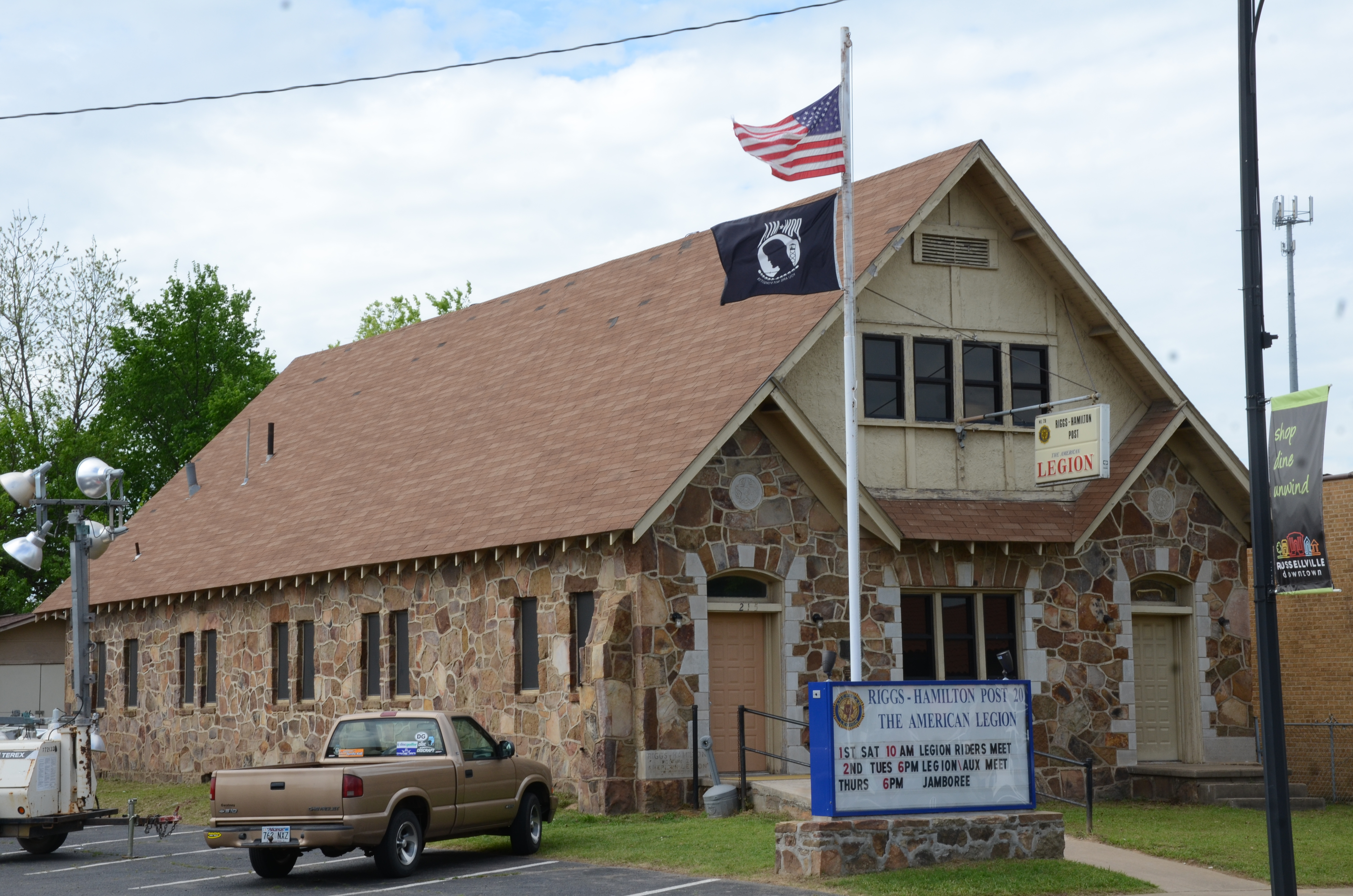

- Location within Arkansas Location within the United States
- Location: 215 N. Denver Ave., Russellville, Arkansas
- Coordinates: 35°16′48″N 93°8′9″W
- Area: less than one acre
- Built: 1936
- Architect: WPA
- Architectural style: Rustic
- Part of: Russellville Downtown Historic District (ID96000941)
- NRHP reference No.: 94000855

Significant dates
- Added to NRHP: August 15, 1994
- Designated CP: September 3, 1996

The Riggs-Hamilton American Legion Post No. 20 is a historic social meeting hall at 215 North Denver Avenue in Russellville, Arkansas. It is a 1 1/2-story stone structure, with a gable roof and stone foundation. Its eaves and gable ends show exposed rafter ends in the Craftsman style, and the main facade has a half-timbered stucco section above twin entrances, each with their own gabled roofs. It was built in 1934, and is one of the finest examples of WPA Rustic architecture in Pope County.

The building was listed on the National Register of Historic Places in 1994, for its architecture.

Legion meetings are held 6:00 pm second Tuesday of each month.

== See also ==
- National Register of Historic Places listings in Pope County, Arkansas
