= Theodore B. Wells =

American architect

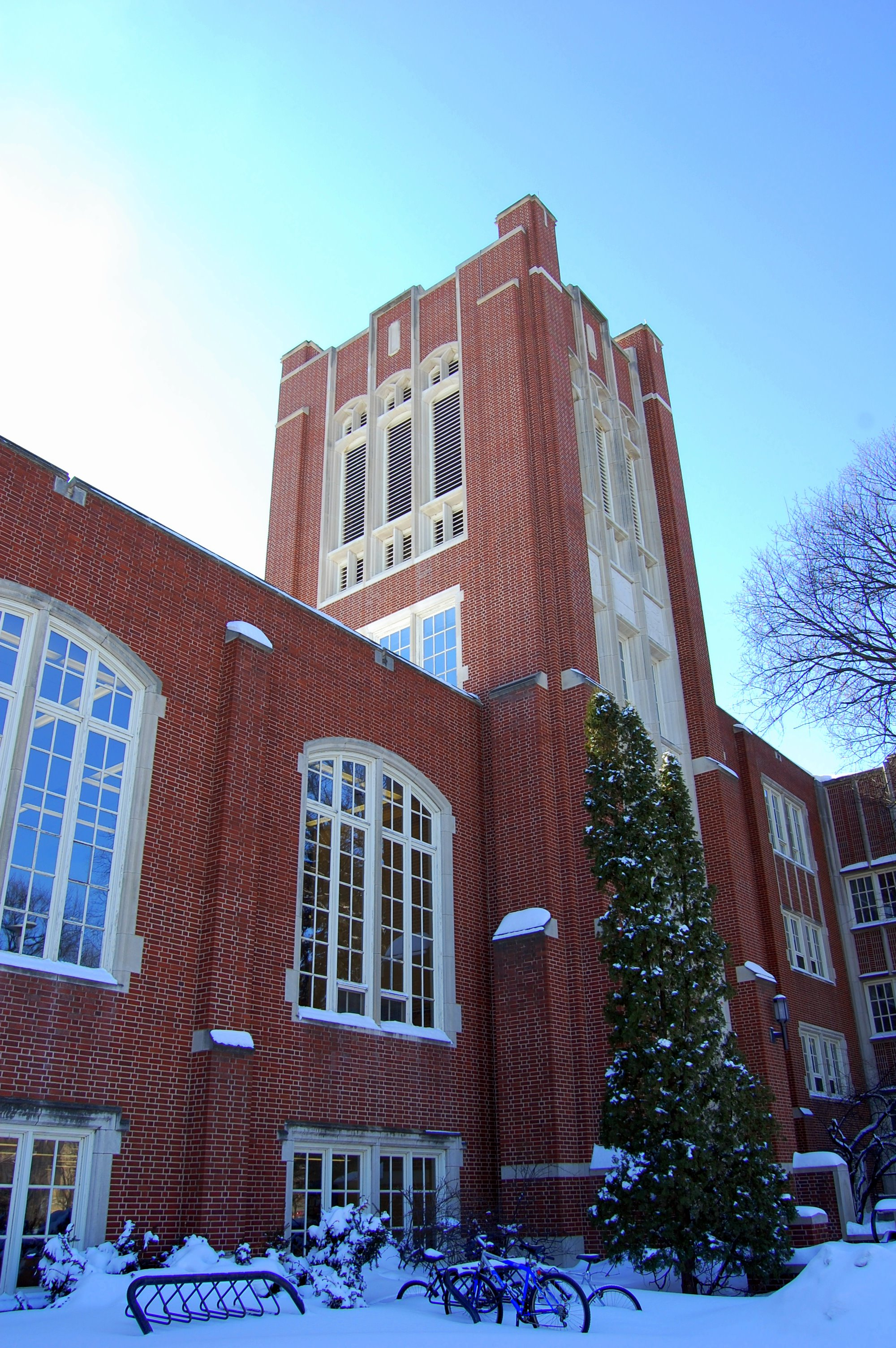
Chester Fritz Library

Theodore B. Wells (1889-1976) was an American architect. He was born in North Dakota. He studied at the École des Beaux-Arts. Back in North Dakota, he designed many public and commercial buildings.

A number of his works are listed on the National Register of Historic Places.

Wells had a sole proprietorship before partnering with Myron Denbrook, Jr. The partnership was located in downtown Grand Forks, North Dakota.

The Wells–Denbrook Architects Office Building in Grand Forks was listed on the National Register in 2014.

Wells served as a president of the North Dakota Association of Architects. During World War I, Wells served with the 307th Engineers, attached to the 82nd Division, serving 22 months, with 13 in France.

Works include (with attribution):

- South Junior High School, 1224 Walnut St., Grand Forks, North Dakota (Wells, Theodore B.), NRHP-listed
- Grand Forks Herald, 120-124 N. 4th St., Grand Forks, North Dakota (Wells, Theo. B.), NRHP-listed
- Grand Forks County Fairgrounds WPA Structures, NRHP-listed
- One or more works in Downtown Grand Forks Historic District, NRHP-listed
- Chester Fritz Library and several other buildings at the University of North Dakota.
- Walsh County Courthouse, Grafton, North Dakota (Wells, T.B .), NRHP-listed
