= KXPO =

- Grafton, North Dakota; United States
- Frequency: 1340 kHz
- Branding: Expo Radio

Programming
- Format: News/Talk, Country
- Affiliations: ABC

Ownership
- Owner: Simmons Broadcasting Inc.
- Sister stations: KAUJ

History
- Call sign meaning: "Expo"

Technical information
- Licensing authority: FCC
- Facility ID: 34475
- Class: C
- Power: 1,000 watts (unlimited)
- Transmitter coordinates: 48°23′53″N 97°26′56″W
- Translators: K230BU (93.9 MHz, Grafton)

Links
- Public license information: Public file; LMS
- Webcast: Listen
- Website: www.mynorthvalley.net

KXPO (1340 AM, "Expo Radio") is a radio station licensed to serve Grafton, North Dakota. The station is owned by Simmons Broadcasting Inc. It airs news/talk and country music programming.

The station was assigned the KXPO call letters by the Federal Communications Commission.
