= Walsh County Courthouse =

- U.S. National Register of Historic Places
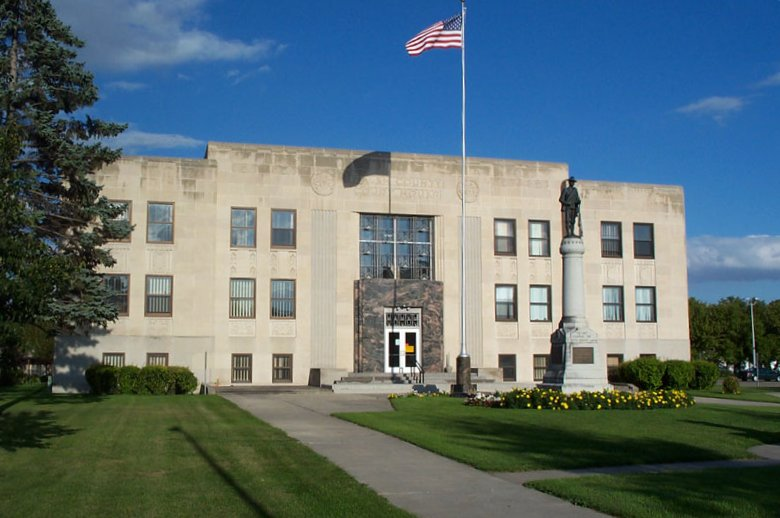

- Location within North Dakota Location within the United States
- Interactive map showing the location for Walsh County Courthouse
- Location: 638 Cooper Ave., Grafton, North Dakota
- Coordinates: 48°25′6″N 97°24′15″W
- Area: 1.7 acres (0.69 ha)
- Built: 1940
- Built by: Johnson & Gilanders
- Architect: Wells, T.B.
- Architectural style: Art Deco
- MPS: North Dakota County Courthouses TR
- NRHP reference No.: 85002992
- Added to NRHP: November 25, 1985

The Walsh County Courthouse in Grafton, North Dakota was built in 1940. It was listed on the National Register of Historic Places in 1985.

It was designed by architect T.B. Wells in Art Deco architecture.
