= Wells–Denbrook Architects Office Building =

- U.S. National Register of Historic Places
- Location within North Dakota Location within the United States
- Location: 1701 Cherry St. (also indicated as 623 17th Avenue South), Grand Forks, North Dakota
- Coordinates: 47°54′13″N 97°02′08″W
- Area: less than one acre
- Built: 1954
- Architectural style: Modern Movement
- NRHP reference No.: 14000900
- Added to NRHP: November 4, 2014

The Wells–Denbrook Architects Office Building was built in 1954 for architects Theodore Wells and Myron E. Denbrook, Jr. in Grand Forks, North Dakota. It was listed on the National Register of Historic Places in 2014.

The architectural firm had three eras: that of Wells alone, then Wells and Denbrook, then Denbrook alone.

It may be characterized as Mid-Century Modern or California/Organic Modern or Desert Modern in style. It has various colors of brick, ribbon windows, an open porch, and a low-slope roof. It is 42.5 by 30 feet (13.0 m × 9.1 m) in plan and rests on an exposed concrete foundation with "small, in-swinging hopper or awning windows with shallow area wells to the lower level."
