= American Legion Hut (Edmond, Oklahoma) =

- U.S. National Register of Historic Places
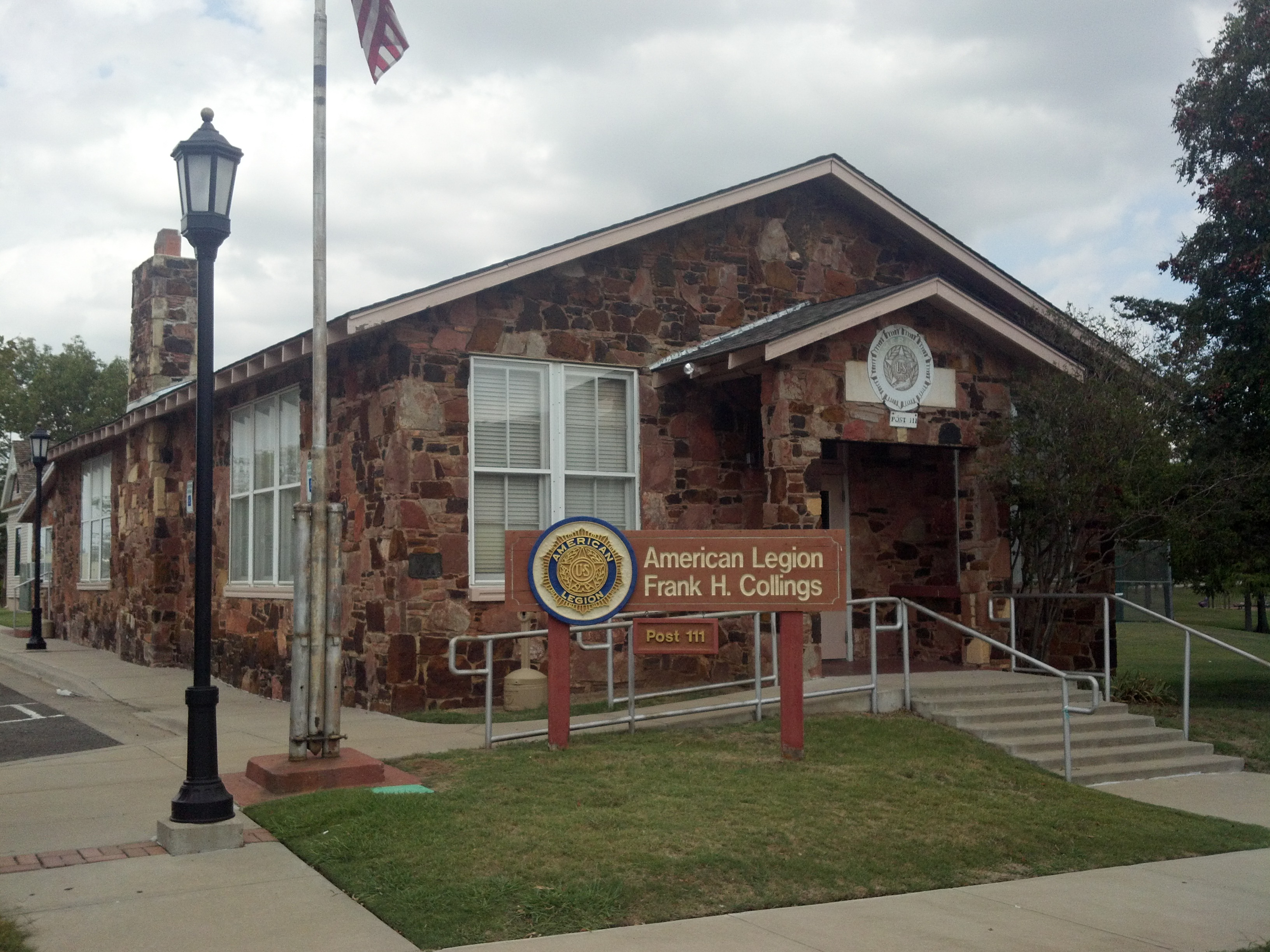

- Location within Oklahoma Location within the United States
- Location: Jct. of Fifth St. and Littler Ave., NE corner, Edmond, Oklahoma
- Coordinates: 35°39′0″N 97°28′47″W
- Area: less than one acre
- Built: 1937
- Architect: WPA
- Architectural style: WPA
- NRHP reference No.: 93001336
- Added to NRHP: December 2, 1993

The American Legion Hut in Edmond, Oklahoma was built in 1937. It has been deemed significant as an example of Works Progress Administration economic activity in Edmond, as it provided employment for 12 workers for six months during the Depression), and for its WPA architecture with Craftsman influence. It is also known as Edmond American Legion Hut and served historically as a meeting hall.

It was listed on the National Register of Historic Places in 1993.
