= The Walsh County Record =

Weekly newspaper in Grafton, North Dakota

- Type: Weekly newspaper
- Format: Broadsheet
- Founder(s): A.L. Woods; E.H. Pierce
- Publisher: Jackie L. Thompson
- Editor: W. Todd Morgan
- Founded: 1889
- Language: English
- Headquarters: Grafton, North Dakota
- Circulation: 3,259
- ISSN: 1067-5922
- OCLC number: 27305001
- Website: wcrecord.com

The Walsh County Record is a weekly newspaper printed in Grafton, North Dakota. It is the newspaper of record of Walsh County, North Dakota covering news, sports, business, community events, and job openings for Grafton, North Dakota and the surrounding communities.

== History ==
In 1889, A.L. Woods and E.H. Pierce founded the weekly Walsh County Record. Woods eventually retired from the firm. In 1901, circulation was just over 1,000. In 1908, Pierce sold the paper to Grant S. Hager. In 1919, Pierce died. In 1923, Hager died.

Later that year his widow sold the Record to Rilie R. Morgan. Prior to the sale, Morgan was one of the youngest men elected president of the North Dakota Press Association. During his reign, the paper was called the Grafton Record. In 1935, Hager was posthumously inducted into the North Dakota Newspaper Hall of Fame.

R.R. Morgan published the Record for decades and served for 16 years in the state legislature where he was the first chairman of the Republican Organizing Committee. In 1942, his eldest son, Rilie R. Morgan Jr., was killed in the Battle of Guadalcanal. W.E. Balkee worked as the paper's editor for much of the postwar period. R.R. Morgan retired in 1959. At that time the Record had a staff of 30, making it the largest private payroll in the county. The paper was published twice weekly with a circulation of 4,500. In 1965, his wife Edith (Thomas) Morgan died.

In 1977, R.R. Morgan died at age 86. The paper was inherited by his son John E. "Jack" Morgan, who in 1971 was elected president of the North Dakota Newspaper Association. In 1979, R.R. Morgan was posthumously inducted into the North Dakota Newspaper Hall of Fame. In 1985, Jack Morgan retired as publisher and in 1989 he died. His widow Dorothy (Danielski) Morgan then became publisher. In 1991, Jack Morgan was posthumously inducted into the hall of fame. In 2006, Dorothy Morgan died and her daughter Jackie L. Thompson took over as publisher. She and the other members of the Morgan family continue to operate the Record.
