= Grand Forks County Fairgrounds WPA Structures =

- U.S. National Register of Historic Places
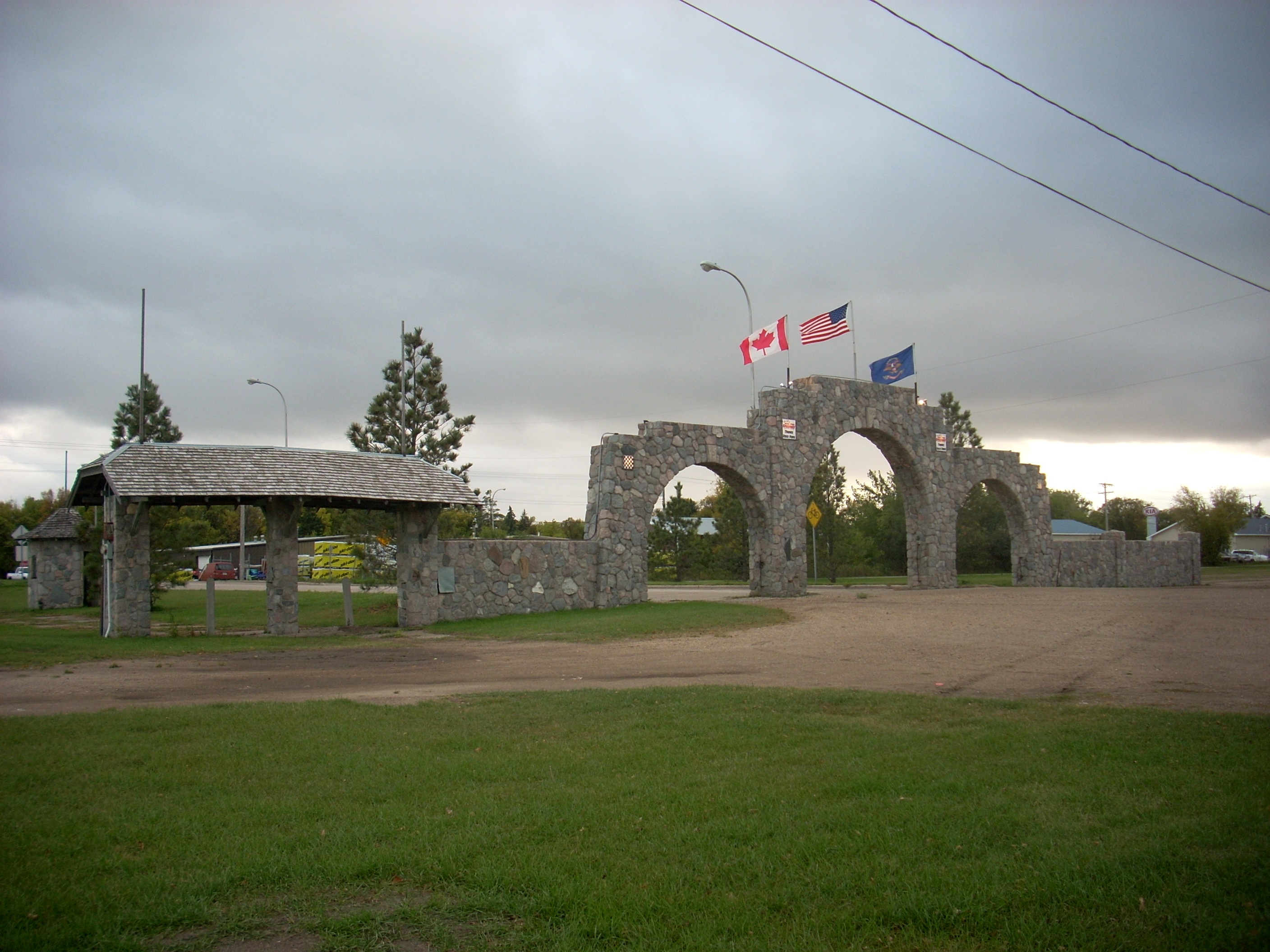
- Some of the structures, in 2009

- Location within North Dakota Location within the United States
- Location: 2300 Gateway Dr., Grand Forks, North Dakota
- Coordinates: 47°55′59″N 97°3′34″W
- Area: 51 acres (21 ha)
- Built: 1936, 1937 and 1939
- Architect: Wells, Theodore B.
- Architectural style: Art Deco and WPA Rustic Fieldstone architecture
- NRHP reference No.: 08001262

Grand Forks County Fairgrounds WPA Structures is a collection of five structures within the Grand Forks County Fairgrounds in Grand Forks, North Dakota, that were listed on the National Register of Historic Places in 2009.

The structures are the fairgrounds entrance gate, ticket kiosk, administration building, and cairns, all built from stone, as well as the fairgrounds grandstand. They are located on the grounds of the Grand Forks State Fair Grounds and are associated with the River Cities Speedway. "The five remaining structures have been recognized as historically significant, examples of the importance of county and state fairs to local culture and social history."

The structures were built between 1936 and 1939 by the Works Progress Administration (WPA). U.S. President Franklin D. Roosevelt attended the 1937 dedication ceremony for the Grand Forks County Fairgrounds grandstand, which was designed by Grand Forks architect Theodore B. Wells and was considered to be innovative in its design.

Steve C. Martens, an architect and North Dakota State University professor, wrote the NRHP nomination. He commented extensively at a public hearing describing the importance of the structures. According to Martens, the project was the largest WPA project in the state.

In 2009 the listed structures included three contributing buildings, one contributing structure, and one contributing object. The nominated listing covers an area of 51 acres (21 ha). The listing is described as including Art Deco and WPA Rustic Fieldstone architecture.

== See also ==
- WPA Stone Structures in Memorial Park and Calvary Cemetery
