= WPA Rustic =

US architectural style

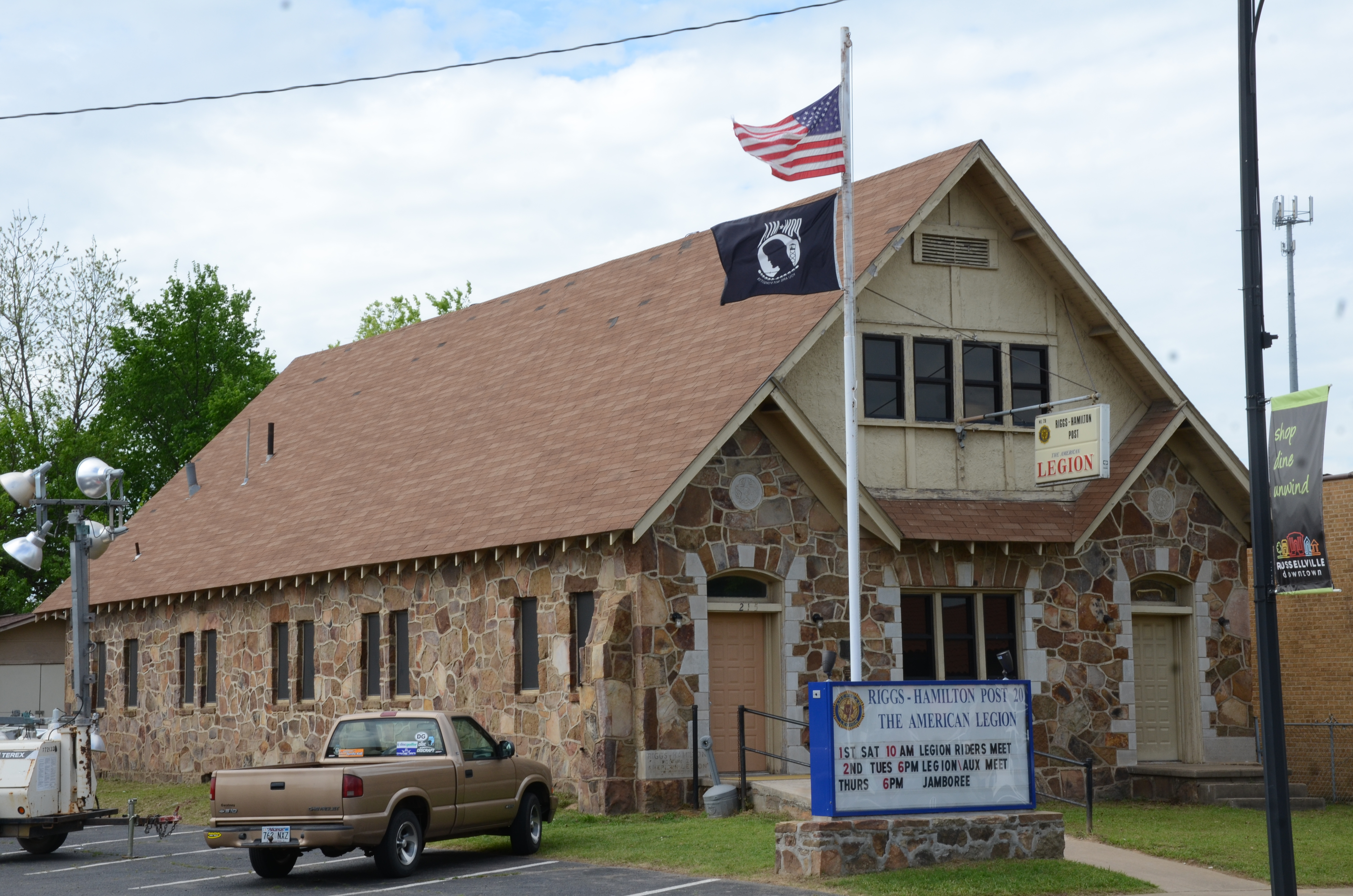
Riggs-Hamilton American Legion Post No. 20, Russellville, Arkansas

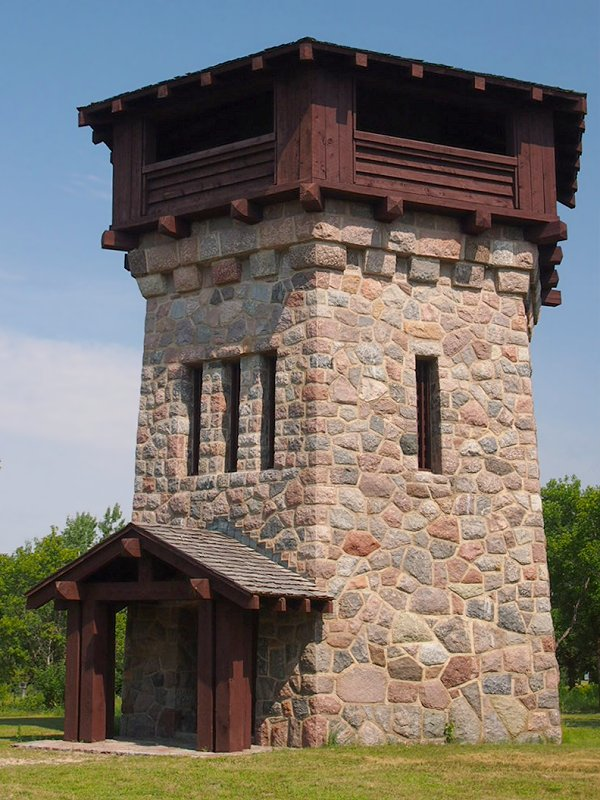
Observation Tower, Lake Bronson State Park, Kittson County, Minnesota

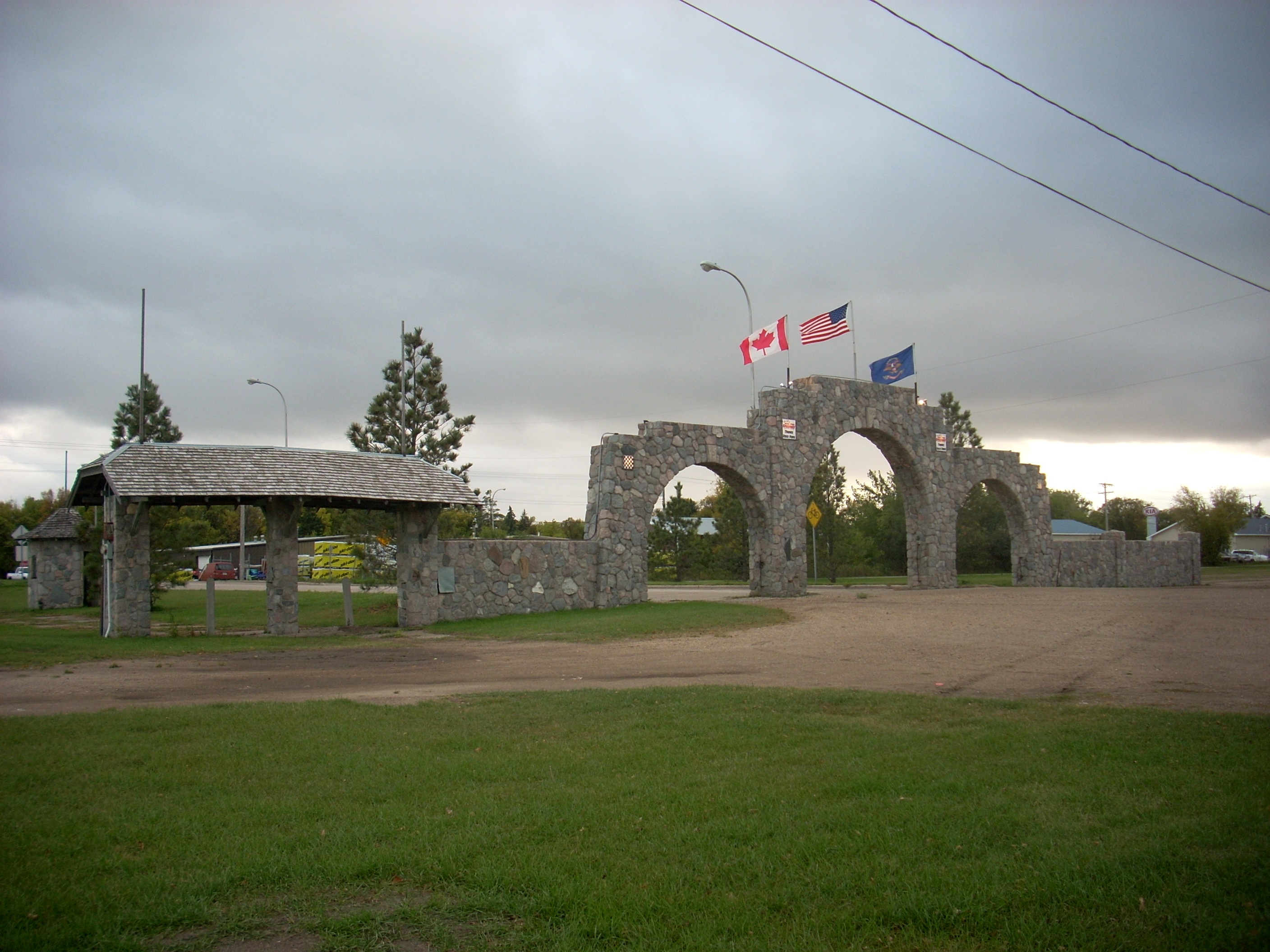
Grand Forks County Fairgrounds, Grand Forks, North Dakota

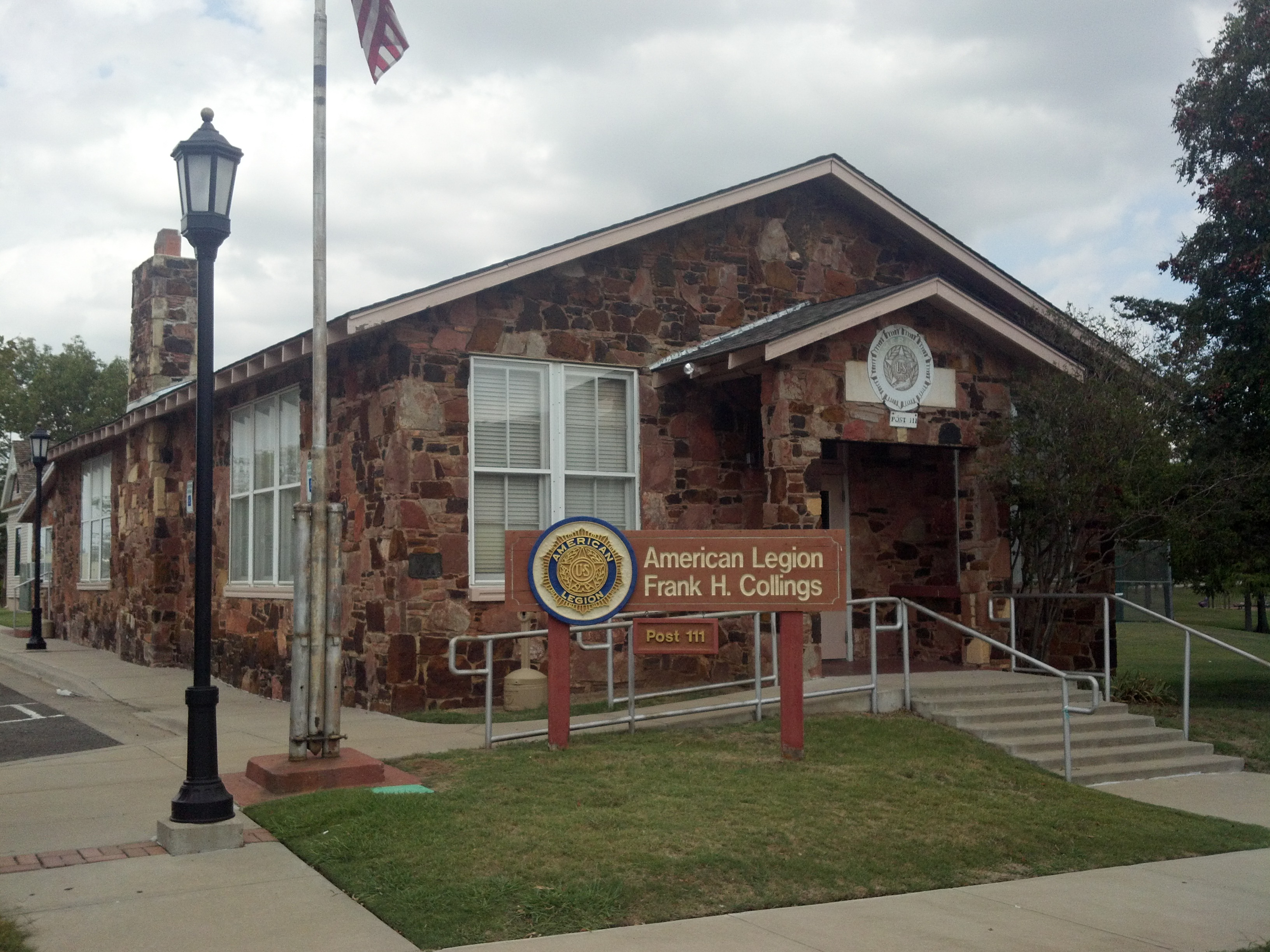
American Legion Hut, Edmond, Oklahoma

WPA Rustic architecture is an architectural style from the era of the U.S. New Deal Works Project Administration. The WPA provided funding for architects to create a variety of buildings, including amphitheaters and lodges. WPA architecture is akin to National Park Service rustic architecture.

WPA Rustic, as opposed to National Park Service Rustic, as utilized in most national parks, involves more demarcation between the building and the landscape.

The term has been used by the National Park Service's National Register of Historic Places program to describe many buildings and structures, including American Legion meeting halls and other buildings built by the WPA in the 1930s.

== Examples ==
Examples include the following:

=== Arkansas ===
- American Legion Hut-Des Arc
- American Legion Post No. 121
- Riggs-Hamilton American Legion Post No. 20

=== Minnesota ===
- Lake Bronson State Park

=== North Dakota ===
- Grand Forks County Fairgrounds WPA Structures, Grand Forks, North Dakota

=== Oklahoma ===
- American Legion Hut (Edmond, Oklahoma)
- American Legion Hut (Tahlequah, Oklahoma)

== See also ==
- PWA Moderne
