= Osnabrock, North Dakota =

- City
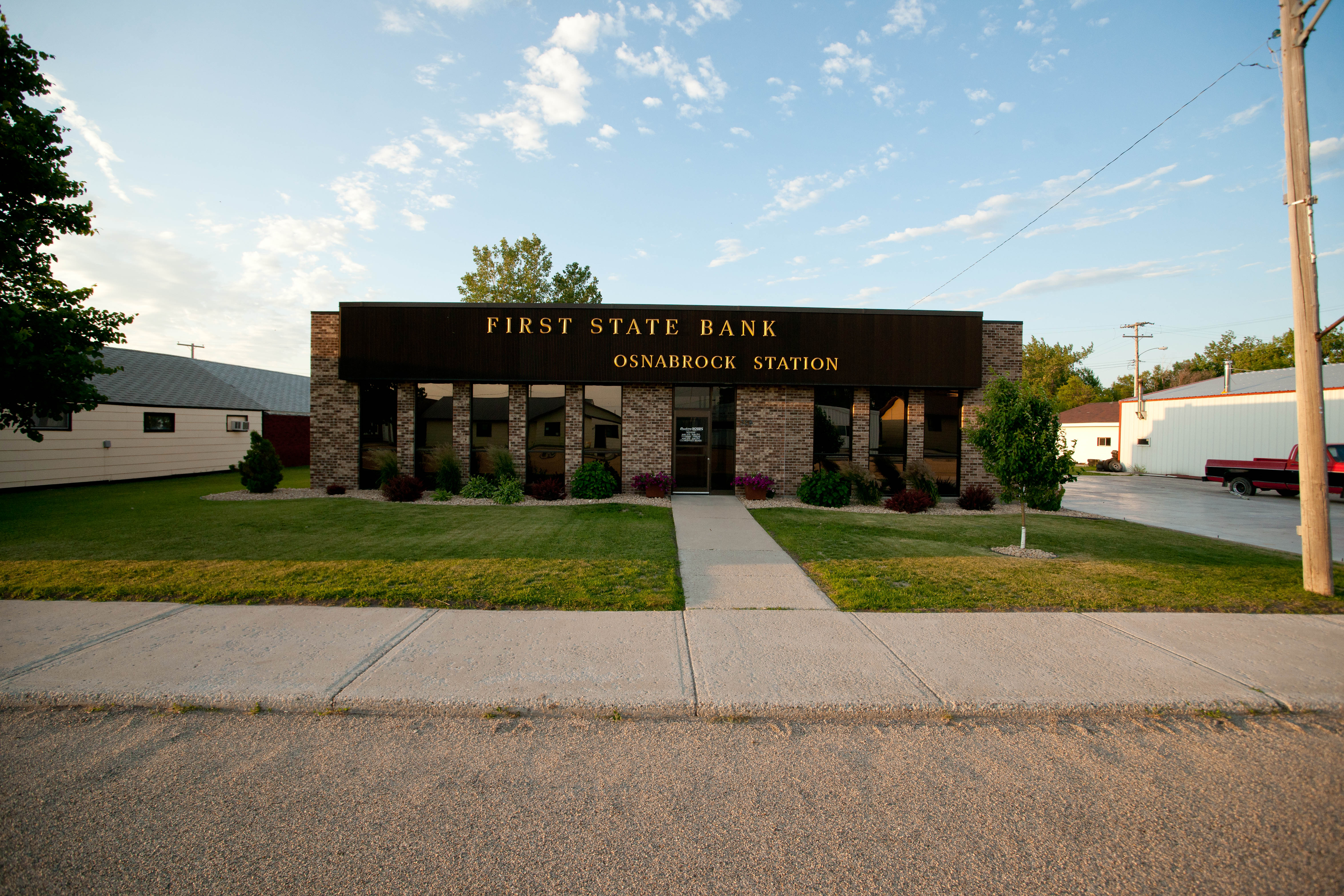
- First State Bank - Osnabrock

- Location of Osnabrock, North Dakota
- Coordinates: 48.670163°N 98.149397°W
- Country: United States
- State: North Dakota
- County: Cavalier
- Founded: 1882
- Incorporated: 1903

Area
  - Total: 0.302 sq mi (0.782 km^{2})
  - Land: 0.300 sq mi (0.778 km^{2})
  - Water: 0.0015 sq mi (0.004 km^{2})
- Elevation: 1,621 ft (494 m)

Population (2020)
  - Total: 105
  - Estimate (2024): 95
  - Density: 349.7/sq mi (135.03/km^{2})
- Time zone: UTC–6 (Central (CST))
  - Summer (DST): UTC–5 (CDT)
- ZIP Code: 58269
- Area code: 701
- FIPS code: 38-60100
- GNIS feature ID: 1036208

Osnabrock is a city in Cavalier County, North Dakota, United States. The population was 105 at the 2020 census. Osnabrock was founded in 1882 and incorporated as a village in 1903. It was named after Osnabruck, Ontario, the home town of its first postmaster, James T. Anderson. (Osnabruck was itself named after the city of Osnabrück in northwest Germany.)

Locally, Osnabrock is called "Oz," and its streets have names including "Yellow Brick Road," "Wizard Street," "Cyclone Street" and "Emerald Street."

== Geography ==
According to the United States Census Bureau, the city has a total area of 0.30 square miles (0.78 km^{2}), all land.

== Demographics ==
Historical population
Census	Pop.	Note	%±
1910	253		—
1920	310		22.5%
1930	244		−21.3%
1940	269		10.2%
1950	284		5.6%
1960	289		1.8%
1970	255		−11.8%
1980	222		−12.9%
1990	214		−3.6%
2000	174		−18.7%
2010	134		−23.0%
2020	105		−21.6%
2024 (est.)	95		−9.5%
U.S. Decennial Census; 2020 Census

=== 2010 census ===
As of the 2010 census, there were 134 people, 51 households, and 36 families residing in the city. The population density was 446.7 inhabitants per square mile (172.5/km^{2}). There were 73 housing units at an average density of 243.3 per square mile (93.9/km^{2}). The racial makeup of the city was 96.3% White, 2.2% Native American, and 1.5% from two or more races. Hispanic or Latino of any race were 0.7% of the population.

There were 51 households, of which 11.8% had children under the age of 18 living with them, 62.7% were married couples living together, 5.9% had a female householder with no husband present, 2.0% had a male householder with no wife present, and 29.4% were non-families. 27.5% of all households were made up of individuals, and 11.7% had someone living alone who was 65 years of age or older. The average household size was 2.12 and the average family size was 2.56.

The median age in the city was 61 years. 10.4% of residents were under the age of 18; 5.3% were between the ages of 18 and 24; 15.7% were from 25 to 44; 24% were from 45 to 64; and 44.8% were 65 years of age or older. The gender makeup of the city was 49.3% male and 50.7% female.

=== 2000 census ===
As of the 2000 census, there were 174 people, 64 households, and 40 families residing in the city. The population density was 592.2 inhabitants per square mile (228.6/km^{2}). There were 85 housing units at an average density of 289.3 per square mile (111.7/km^{2}). The racial makeup of the city was 95.98% White, 2.30% Native American, and 1.72% from two or more races. Hispanic or Latino of any race were 3.45% of the population.

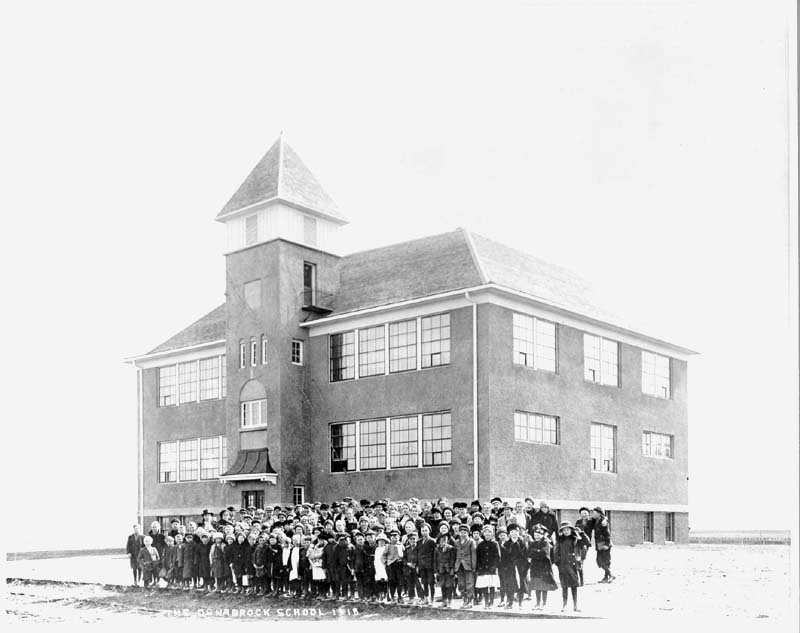
The public school in 1918

There were 64 households, out of which 28.1% had children under the age of 18 living with them, 53.1% were married couples living together, 3.1% had a female householder with no husband present, and 37.5% were non-families. 35.9% of all households were made up of individuals, and 20.3% had someone living alone who was 65 years of age or older. The average household size was 2.23 and the average family size was 2.95.

In the city, the population was spread out, with 21.3% under the age of 18, 8.0% from 18 to 24, 14.9% from 25 to 44, 21.3% from 45 to 64, and 34.5% who were 65 years of age or older. The median age was 50 years. For every 100 females, there were 95.5 males. For every 100 females age 18 and over, there were 98.6 males.

The median income for a household in the city was $43,438, and the median income for a family was $50,938. Males had a median income of $28,750 versus $20,000 for females. The per capita income for the city was $14,254. About 2.7% of families and 6.8% of the population were below the poverty line, including 10.6% of those under the age of eighteen and 12.1% of those 65 or over.

== In popular culture ==
A photo of a tornado taken near Osnabrock in 1978 was featured in a Time-Life publication on tornadoes and also on a USPS postage stamp.
