= KYTZ =

Radio station in Walhalla–Langdon, North Dakota

Coordinates: 48.644°N 97.980°W

- Walhalla, North Dakota; United States
- Broadcast area: Langdon—Grafton, ND/Morden—Winkler—Altona, MB
- Frequency: 106.7 MHz
- Branding: 106.7 The Rock Farm

Programming
- Format: Classic rock

Ownership
- Owner: Simmons Broadcasting
- Sister stations: KAOC, KNDK, KLME

History
- First air date: 1999
- Former call signs: KAUJ (1997–2001)

Technical information
- Licensing authority: FCC
- Facility ID: 49019
- Class: C2
- ERP: 16,000 watts
- HAAT: 255 meters

Links
- Public license information: Public file; LMS
- Webcast: Listen Live
- Website: rockfarm1067.com

KYTZ (106.7 FM, "The Rock Farm") is a radio station broadcasting a classic rock format. Licensed to Walhalla, North Dakota, it serves Langdon, North Dakota and Morden, Manitoba. The station is currently owned by Simmons Broadcasting. All four Simmons Broadcasting stations share studios at 1403 Third Street in Langdon, ND. Canadian studios are at 467 Stephen Street in Morden, Manitoba.

== History ==
The station was known as "Z106.7" with a Hot AC format for several years and became a Top 40 (CHR) format as "Big 106" in 2011.

On July 4, 2021 KYTZ changed their format from top 40/CHR to classic rock, branded as "106.7 The Rock Farm".
