= Heave =

Heave or heaving may refer to:

- Heave (translational motion), one of the translational degrees of freedom of any stiff body (for example a vehicle), describing motion along the vertical axis (to move up or down)
- Heaving to or 'heave to', a way of slowing a sailing vessel's forward progress
- Hiv, Iran (romanized as Heave), a village in Alborz Province, Iran
- Heave, a slang term for the act of vomiting
