= Loma, North Dakota =

- City
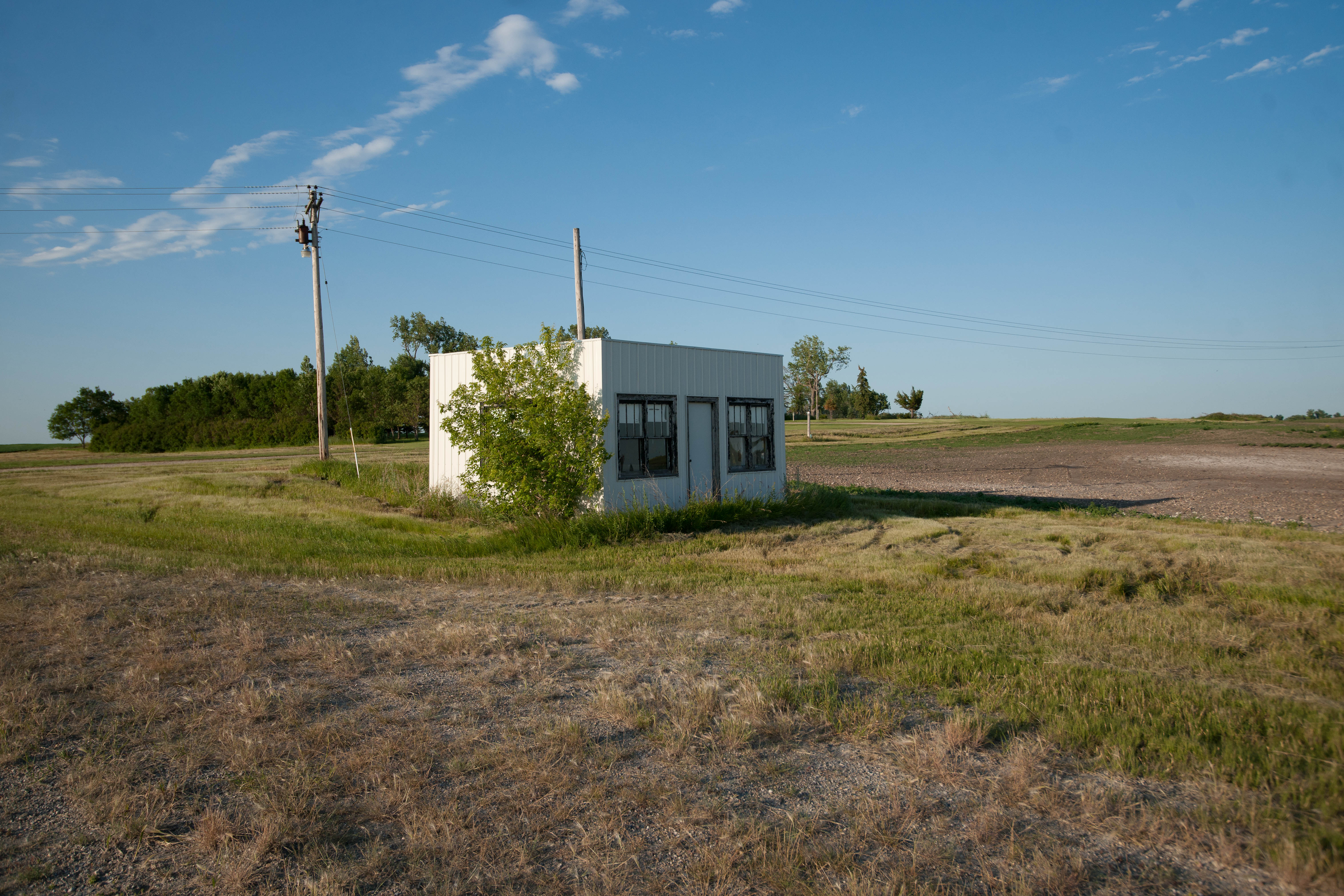
- Building in Loma

- Location of Loma, North Dakota
- Coordinates: 48°38′30″N 98°31′29″W
- Country: United States
- State: North Dakota
- County: Cavalier
- Founded: 1905

Area
  - Total: 26.85 sq mi (69.54 km^{2})
  - Land: 26.46 sq mi (68.53 km^{2})
  - Water: 0.39 sq mi (1.01 km^{2})
- Elevation: 1,568 ft (478 m)

Population (2020)
  - Total: 10
  - Estimate (2024): 9
  - Density: 0.39/sq mi (0.15/km^{2})
- Time zone: UTC–6 (Central (CST))
  - Summer (DST): UTC–5 (CDT)
- ZIP Code: 58311
- Area code: 701
- FIPS code: 38-47660
- GNIS feature ID: 1036135

Loma is a city in Cavalier County, North Dakota, United States. The population was 10 at the 2020 census. Loma was founded in 1905.

== Geography ==
According to the United States Census Bureau, the city has a total area of 26.83 square miles (69.49 km^{2}), of which 26.43 square miles (68.45 km^{2}) is land and 0.40 square miles (1.04 km^{2}) is water.

== Demographics ==
Historical population
Census	Pop.	Note	%±
1930	293		—
1940	256		−12.6%
1950	53		−79.3%
1960	20		−62.3%
1970	85		325.0%
1980	39		−54.1%
1990	27		−30.8%
2000	21		−22.2%
2010	16		−23.8%
2020	10		−37.5%
2024 (est.)	9		−10.0%
U.S. Decennial Census; 2020 Census

=== 2010 census ===
As of the 2010 census, there were 16 people, 7 households, and 3 families residing in the city. The population density was 0.6 inhabitants per square mile (0.2/km^{2}). There were 13 housing units at an average density of 0.5 per square mile (0.2/km^{2}). The racial makeup of the city was 100.0% White.

There were 7 households, of which 28.6% had children under the age of 18 living with them, 28.6% were married couples living together, 14.3% had a female householder with no husband present, and 57.1% were non-families. 57.1% of all households were made up of individuals, and 28.6% had someone living alone who was 65 years of age or older. The average household size was 2.29 and the average family size was 4.00.

The median age in the city was 43 years. 25% of residents were under the age of 18; 12.6% were between the ages of 18 and 24; 12.5% were from 25 to 44; 31.3% were from 45 to 64; and 18.8% were 65 years of age or older. The gender makeup of the city was 56.3% male and 43.8% female.

=== 2000 census ===
As of the 2000 census, there were 21 people, 9 households, and 7 families residing in the city. The population density was 0.8 people per square mile (0.3/km^{2}). There were 10 housing units at an average density of 0.4 per square mile (0.1/km^{2}). The racial makeup of the city was 100.00% White.

There were 9 households, out of which 11.1% had children under the age of 18 living with them, 55.6% were married couples living together, 11.1% had a female householder with no husband present, and 22.2% were non-families. 22.2% of all households were made up of individuals, and none had someone living alone who was 65 years of age or older. The average household size was 2.33 and the average family size was 2.71.

In the city, the population was spread out, with 19.0% under the age of 18, 4.8% from 18 to 24, 19.0% from 25 to 44, 19.0% from 45 to 64, and 38.1% who were 65 years of age or older. The median age was 58 years. For every 100 females, there were 110.0 males. For every 100 females age 18 and over, there were 112.5 males.

The median income for a household in the city was $63,750, and the median income for a family was $63,750. Males had a median income of $43,750 versus $18,750 for females. The per capita income for the city was $18,245. None of the population and none of the families were below the poverty line.
