= Cavalier County, North Dakota =

County in North Dakota, United States

- County
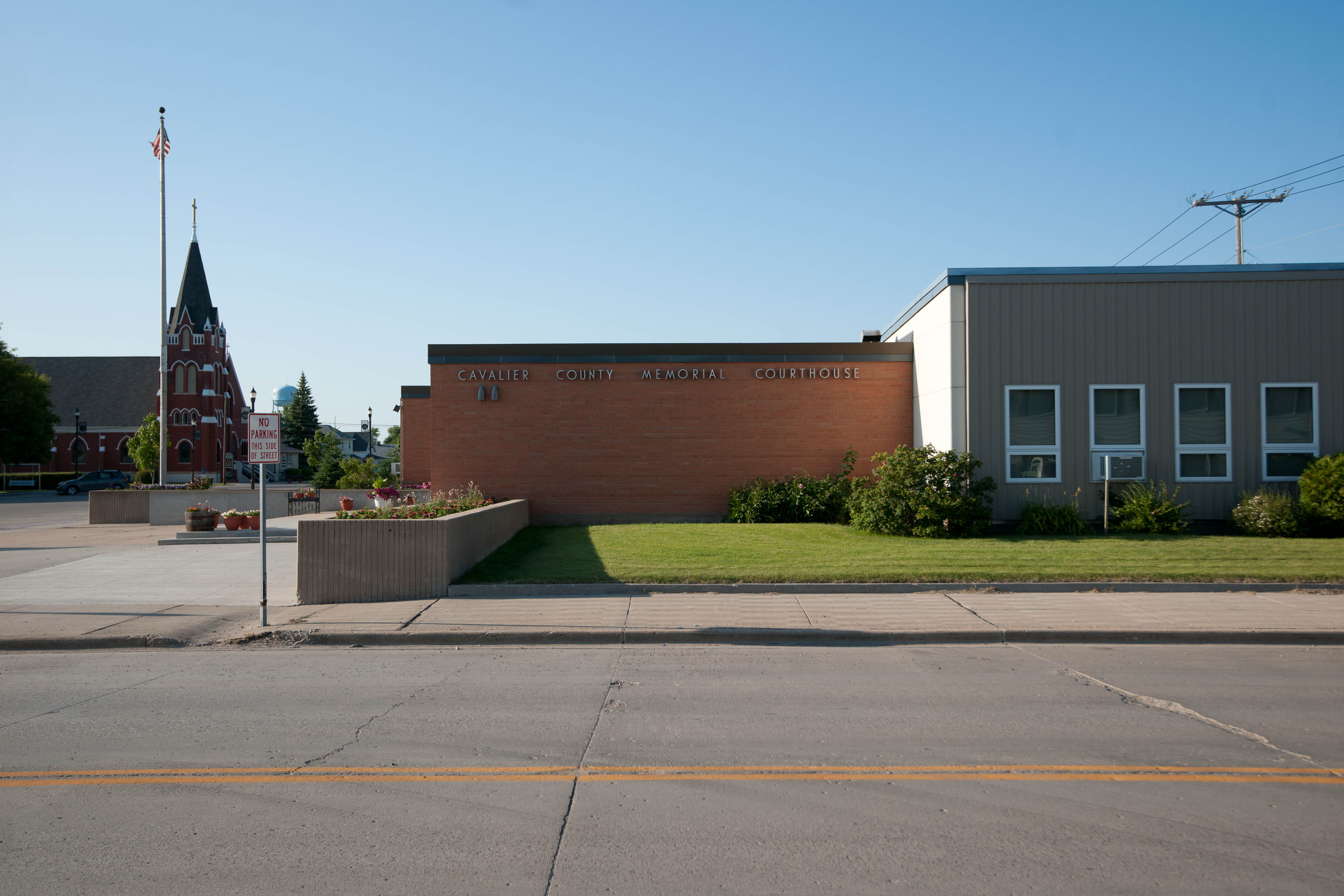
- The Cavalier County Courthouse in Langdon

- Location within the U.S. state of North Dakota
- Coordinates: 48.768439°N 98.46379°W
- Country: United States
- State: North Dakota
- Founded: January 4, 1873 (created); July 8, 1884 (organized)
- Named for: Fur trapper and explorer Charles Cavalier
- Seat: Langdon
- Largest city: Langdon

Area
  - Total: 1,509.835 sq mi (3,910.45 km^{2})
  - Land: 1,489.125 sq mi (3,856.82 km^{2})
  - Water: 20.710 sq mi (53.64 km^{2}) 1.37%

Population (2020)
  - Total: 3,704
  - Estimate (2025): 3,497 ▼
  - Density: 2.395/sq mi (0.925/km^{2})
- Time zone: UTC−6 (Central)
  - Summer (DST): UTC−5 (CDT)
- Area code: 701
- Congressional district: At-large
- Website: cavaliercounty.us

Cavalier County is a county in the U.S. state of North Dakota. It is south of the Canada–US border with Manitoba. As of the 2020 census, the population was 3,704, and was estimated to be 3,497 in 2025. The county seat and the largest city is Langdon.

There is also a city named Cavalier but it is not located in Cavalier County. The city of Cavalier is the county seat of Pembina County, which is east of Cavalier County.

== History ==
The Dakota Territory legislature created Cavalier County on January 4, 1873, with territory annexed from Pembina County, but did not organize the county government structure at the time. It was named for Charles Cavileer (or Cavalier) of Pembina, an early settler. The county was organized on July 8, 1884. Its boundaries were altered in 1883 and in 1887.

After petitioning the Territorial Governor for permission to organize the county, Patrick McHugh, W. Hudson Matthews, and L.C. Noracong met on July 8, 1884. On July 26 the new county officials met for the second time and chose Noracong as chairman of the board with William H. Doyle and Matthews as Commissioners. The first Register of Deeds and County Clerk was McHugh. W.J. Mooney became the first Judge of Probate, Charles B. Nelson was the first Cavalier County Supt. of Schools, and Clarence Hawkes the first sheriff. Cavalier took its current form in 1887 after the Territorial Legislature authorized an increase in size by taking a portion from Pembina County. The expansion added 15 new townships to the county.

A site for a county seat was selected at the second meeting; it was named Langdon, for Robert Bruce Langdon of Minnesota, an official with the Great Northern Railroad. Langdon never visited the town, but reportedly donated a bell for the local school.

The first courthouse was built in 1884 at a cost of $360.00. It was used briefly and then abandoned for warmer and more centrally located quarters in a downtown bank. A large brick courthouse was built in 1895 on the present site, the contract cost was $9,099.00. The building served county officials until a courthouse was constructed in 1957–58.

=== Cavalier County Historical Society ===
Established after 1969 - The Holy Trinity Church at Dresden, North Dakota became the cornerstone of the County Museum. It now houses local historic artifacts and landmarks.

The Holy Trinity Church at Dresden replaced two previous wooden structures that both burned. The present structure was erected in 1936, built out of fieldstone collected by the local parishioners. Fabian Redmond, a Minneapolis architect designed the building. A stonemason from Rugby, North Dakota, Edroy Patterson, directed volunteer workers. Assisting in the building of the church were Andrew Bachman-head carpenter, Alphonse Hiltner, Stanley Koehmstedt and William Geisen.

== Geography ==
Cavalier County is located on the north edge of North Dakota. Its north boundary line abuts the south boundary line of Canada. The Pembina River enters from Manitoba and flows southeasterly through the eastern part of the county, exiting near the southeast corner. The county terrain consists of rolling hills, dotted with lakes and ponds in the western part. The terrain slopes to the east, with its highest point near the midpoint of the south boundary line at 1,644 ft (501 m) ASL.

According to the United States Census Bureau, the county has a total area of 1,509.835 square miles (3,910.45 km^{2}), of which 1,489.125 square miles (3,856.82 km^{2}) is land and 20.710 square miles (53.64 km^{2}) (1.37%) is water. It is the 16th largest county in North Dakota by total area.

=== Major highways ===
- North Dakota Highway 1
- North Dakota Highway 5
- North Dakota Highway 20
- North Dakota Highway 66

=== Adjacent counties and rural municipalities ===
- Municipality of Louise, Manitoba (north)
- Municipality of Pembina, Manitoba (north)
- Rural Municipality of Stanley, Manitoba (north)
- Pembina County (east)
- Walsh County (southeast)
- Ramsey County (south)
- Towner County (west)

=== Lakes ===
- Rush Lake

== Demographics ==
Historical population
Census	Pop.	Note	%±
1890	6,471		—
1900	12,580		94.4%
1910	15,659		24.5%
1920	15,555		−0.7%
1930	14,554		−6.4%
1940	13,923		−4.3%
1950	11,840		−15.0%
1960	10,064		−15.0%
1970	8,213		−18.4%
1980	7,636		−7.0%
1990	6,064		−20.6%
2000	4,831		−20.3%
2010	3,993		−17.3%
2020	3,704		−7.2%
2025 (est.)	3,497	▼	−5.6%
U.S. Decennial Census; 1790–1960 1900–1990; 1990–2000 2010–2020

The top five reported ancestries (people were allowed to report up to two ancestries, thus the figures will generally add to more than 100%) were English (95.6%), Spanish (1.5%), Indo-European (2.4%), Asian and Pacific Islander (0.1%), and Other (0.4%). The median age in the county was 47.1 years.

Cavalier County, North Dakota – racial and ethnic composition
Note: the US Census treats Hispanic/Latino as an ethnic category. This table excludes Latinos from the racial categories and assigns them to a separate category. Hispanics/Latinos may be of any race.

Race / ethnicity (NH = non-Hispanic)	Pop. 1980	Pop. 1990	Pop. 2000	Pop. 2010	Pop. 2020
White alone (NH)	7,572 (99.16%)	6,004 (99.01%)	4,720 (97.70%)	3,890 (97.42%)	3,485 (94.09%)
Black or African American alone (NH)	1 (0.01%)	4 (0.07%)	6 (0.12%)	4 (0.10%)	2 (0.05%)
Native American or Alaska Native alone (NH)	38 (0.50%)	45 (0.74%)	25 (0.52%)	35 (0.88%)	28 (0.76%)
Asian alone (NH)	6 (0.08%)	3 (0.05%)	4 (0.08%)	9 (0.23%)	16 (0.43%)
Pacific Islander alone (NH)	—	—	0 (0.00%)	1 (0.03%)	0 (0.00%)
Other race alone (NH)	3 (0.04%)	0 (0.00%)	2 (0.04%)	1 (0.03%)	15 (0.40%)
Mixed race or multiracial (NH)	—	—	43 (0.89%)	29 (0.73%)	113 (3.05%)
Hispanic or Latino (any race)	16 (0.21%)	8 (0.13%)	31 (0.64%)	24 (0.60%)	45 (1.21%)
Total	7,636 (100.00%)	6,064 (100.00%)	4,831 (100.00%)	3,993 (100.00%)	3,704 (100.00%)

=== 2024 estimate ===
As of the fourth quarter of 2024, the median home value in Cavalier County was $129,584. As of the 2023 American Community Survey, there are 1,539 estimated households in Cavalier County with an average of 2.32 persons per household. The county has a median household income of $67,064. Approximately 9.2% of the county's population lives at or below the poverty line. Cavalier County has an estimated 60.4% employment rate, with 22.2% of the population holding a bachelor's degree or higher and 93.1% holding a high school diploma.

As of the 2024 estimate, there were 3,567 people and 1,539 households residing in the county. There were 2,106 housing units at an average density of 1.41 per square mile (0.5/km^{2}). The racial makeup of the county was 95.0% White (92.8% NH White), 0.7% African American, 2.0% Native American, 0.7% Asian, 0.0% Pacific Islander, _% from some other races and 1.7% from two or more races. Hispanic or Latino people of any race were 2.5% of the population.

=== 2020 census ===
As of the 2020 census, there were 3,704 people, 1,661 households, and 1,034 families residing in the county. The population density was 2.5 inhabitants per square mile (1.0/km^{2}). There were 2,097 housing units at an average density of 1.41 per square mile (0.5/km^{2}).

Of the residents, 22.1% were under the age of 18 and 26.6% were 65 years of age or older; the median age was 48.1 years. For every 100 females there were 106.7 males, and for every 100 females age 18 and over there were 106.5 males.

The racial makeup of the county was 94.6% White, 0.1% Black or African American, 0.8% American Indian and Alaska Native, 0.4% Asian, 0.6% from some other race, and 3.5% from two or more races. Hispanic or Latino residents of any race comprised 1.2% of the population.

There were 1,661 households in the county, of which 24.0% had children under the age of 18 living with them and 18.5% had a female householder with no spouse or partner present. About 32.9% of all households were made up of individuals and 14.5% had someone living alone who was 65 years of age or older.

There were 2,097 housing units, of which 20.8% were vacant. Among occupied housing units, 81.0% were owner-occupied and 19.0% were renter-occupied. The homeowner vacancy rate was 3.2% and the rental vacancy rate was 17.9%.

=== 2010 census ===
As of the 2010 census, there were 3,993 people, 1,818 households, and 1,142 families residing in the county. The population density was 2.7 inhabitants per square mile (1.0/km^{2}). There were 2,309 housing units at an average density of 1.55 per square mile (0.6/km^{2}). The racial makeup of the county was 97.72% White, 0.10% African American, 0.93% Native American, 0.23% Asian, 0.03% Pacific Islander, 0.23% from some other races and 0.78% from two or more races. Hispanic or Latino people of any race were 0.60% of the population. In terms of ancestry, 44.5% were German, 28.8% were Norwegian, 10.8% were American, 5.8% were Irish, 5.7% were Swedish, and 5.4% were English.

There were 1,818 households, 21.8% had children under the age of 18 living with them, 55.7% were married couples living together, 4.0% had a female householder with no husband present, 37.2% were non-families, and 34.2% of all households were made up of individuals. The average household size was 2.15 and the average family size was 2.74. The median age was 50.3 years.

The median income for a household in the county was $48,786 and the median income for a family was $57,066. Males had a median income of $41,885 versus $26,914 for females. The per capita income for the county was $26,468. About 6.1% of families and 8.2% of the population were below the poverty line, including 12.8% of those under age 18 and 10.8% of those age 65 or over.

== Communities ==
=== Cities ===
- Alsen
- Calio
- Calvin
- Hannah
- Langdon (county seat)
- Loma
- Milton
- Munich
- Nekoma
- Osnabrock
- Sarles (partly in Towner County)
- Wales

=== Unincorporated communities ===
- Clyde
- Dresden
- Easby
- Hove Mobile Park
- Maida
- Mount Carmel
- Olga
- Union
- Vang
- Weaver

=== Townships ===
- Alma
- Banner
- Billings
- Bruce
- Byron
- Cypress
- Dresden
- Easby
- East Alma
- Elgin
- Fremont
- Glenila
- Gordon
- Grey
- Harvey
- Hay
- Henderson
- Hope
- Huron
- Langdon
- Linden
- Loam
- Manilla
- Minto
- Montrose
- Moscow
- Mount Carmel
- Nekoma
- North Loma
- North Olga
- Osford
- Osnabrock
- Perry
- Seivert
- South Dresden
- South Olga
- Storlie
- Trier
- Waterloo
- West Hope

== Politics ==
Cavalier County voters have been reliably Republican for several decades. In only one national election since 1964 has the county selected the Democratic Party candidate (as of 2024).

United States presidential election results for Cavalier County, North Dakota
Year	Republican		Democratic		Third party(ies)	
Year	No.	%	No.	%	No.	%
1900	1,361	51.34%	1,211	45.68%	79	2.98%
1904	1,664	66.77%	771	30.94%	57	2.29%
1908	1,528	55.06%	1,190	42.88%	57	2.05%
1912	561	24.07%	932	39.98%	838	35.95%
1916	1,502	55.08%	1,149	42.13%	76	2.79%
1920	3,936	79.21%	981	19.74%	52	1.05%
1924	2,428	54.65%	539	12.13%	1,476	33.22%
1928	3,068	54.86%	2,510	44.89%	14	0.25%
1932	1,471	27.83%	3,770	71.33%	44	0.83%
1936	1,657	28.52%	3,533	60.82%	619	10.66%
1940	2,845	50.64%	2,757	49.07%	16	0.28%
1944	2,011	46.68%	2,274	52.79%	23	0.53%
1948	1,864	44.83%	2,198	52.86%	96	2.31%
1952	3,519	69.66%	1,496	29.61%	37	0.73%
1956	2,450	57.04%	1,836	42.75%	9	0.21%
1960	2,430	51.23%	2,312	48.75%	1	0.02%
1964	1,417	33.49%	2,810	66.41%	4	0.09%
1968	1,953	50.85%	1,631	42.46%	257	6.69%
1972	2,898	60.07%	1,867	38.70%	59	1.22%
1976	2,046	47.58%	2,178	50.65%	76	1.77%
1980	2,582	64.92%	1,105	27.78%	290	7.29%
1984	2,661	69.95%	1,110	29.18%	33	0.87%
1988	2,096	60.63%	1,333	38.56%	28	0.81%
1992	1,527	48.85%	866	27.70%	733	23.45%
1996	1,188	47.85%	941	37.90%	354	14.26%
2000	1,513	63.81%	618	26.06%	240	10.12%
2004	1,522	62.27%	887	36.29%	35	1.43%
2008	1,128	52.96%	930	43.66%	72	3.38%
2012	1,195	57.76%	818	39.54%	56	2.71%
2016	1,357	67.65%	476	23.73%	173	8.62%
2020	1,499	74.21%	474	23.47%	47	2.33%
2024	1,461	73.53%	491	24.71%	35	1.76%

== See also ==
- National Register of Historic Places listings in Cavalier County, North Dakota
