= Dresden, North Dakota =

Unincorporated community in North Dakota, US

Dresden
- Dresden, North Dakota
- Coordinates: 48°49′38″N 98°28′53″W
- Country: United States
- State: North Dakota
- County: Cavalier County

Dresden is an unincorporated community in Cavalier County, North Dakota, United States.

== History ==
A post office named Dresden operated from 1897 to 1975. The population was 180 in 1940.

Dresden is home to the Cavalier County Museum.
