= KLME =

Classic rock radio station in Langdon, North Dakota, United States

Coordinates: 48.755°N 98.361°W

- Langdon, North Dakota; United States
- Frequency: 95.7 MHz
- Branding: MyFM 95.7

Programming
- Format: Adult contemporary

Ownership
- Owner: Simmons Broadcasting; (KNDK, Inc.)
- Sister stations: KAOC, KNDK, KYTZ

History
- First air date: 1990 (as KVLR)
- Former call signs: KVLR (1990–1991); KNDK-FM (1991–2021)

Technical information
- Licensing authority: FCC
- Facility ID: 35212
- Class: A
- ERP: 6,000 watts
- HAAT: 100 meters

Links
- Public license information: Public file; LMS

KLME (95.7 FM, "MyFM 95.7") is a radio station serving Langdon, North Dakota. The station is currently owned by Simmons Broadcasting. All four Simmons Broadcasting stations share studios at 1403 Third Street in Langdon, North Dakota.

Sometime in 2021, KLME dropped its "Rock Farm" classic rock format (which moved to KYTZ 106.7 FM Walhalla) and rebranded as "MyFM 95.7" with an unknown format.
