= Lake Bronson State Park =

- Lake Bronson State Park WPA/Rustic Style Historic Resources
- U.S. National Register of Historic Places
- U.S. Historic district
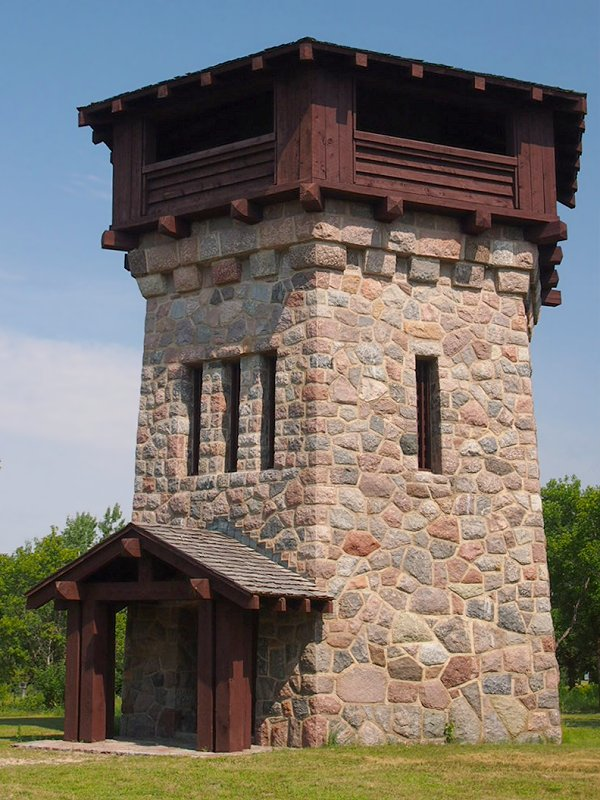
- The WPA-built observation/water tower

- Location within Minnesota Location within the United States
- Location: Kittson County, Minnesota
- Nearest city: Lake Bronson, Minnesota
- Coordinates: 48°43′29″N 96°36′12″W
- Area: 3,598 acres (1,456 ha)
- Visitation: 110,975 (2006)
- MPS: Minnesota State Park CCC/WPA/Rustic Style MPS
- NRHP reference No.: 89001659
- Added to NRHP: October 25, 1989

Lake Bronson State Park is a state park off of Kittson County Highway 28 East near Lake Bronson in the northwestern corner of Minnesota.

== Geology ==
The park is now dominated by Lake Bronson, and represents a transition between prairie and forest which supports a variety of wildlife. Thousands of years ago the area was covered by Glacial Lake Agassiz. Lake Agassiz retreated in stages leaving gravel ridges along a generally flat terrain. Streams quietly cut through these ridges and the dam that created Lake Bronson is blocking one of these ridges along the South Branch of the Two Rivers.

== History ==
Kittson County has no natural lakes, which is unusual for Minnesota. In the early 1930s, during the Great Depression, Kittson County was going through a drought. Local officials decided to build a reservoir on the South Branch of Two Rivers near the city of Bronson. Supporters lobbied the state and federal government to fund the project, and in 1936, funding was finally made available. By this time, the plan had evolved into a recreation area in addition to the reservoir. Kittson County was lacking in recreation facilities, and officials realized that county residents and tourists would appreciate a park.

Construction of the reservoir started in April 1936 with crews from the Works Progress Administration. It was difficult to find a stable bedrock foundation for the dam, so crews needed to squeeze water from the "quicksand" foundation. Pumps were used to pull water from the quicksand while the dam was built. Since the sand would get wet and soft again, the pumps were not a permanent solution. Rather, the dam was designed with ten seepage pipes that drain into a drainage tunnel passing through the dam's three spillways. The dam, completed in June 1937, created a 325-acre (1.3 km^{2}) reservoir and was well received by local residents.

The land surrounding the new reservoir was designated a state park, and several fieldstone structures were built. The most prominent of these was a 45-foot (14 m) hexagonal stone water tower. Other structures, such as an office, a garage, a picnic shelter, and bathing facilities followed. In 1939, the city of Bronson renamed itself "Lake Bronson" to commemorate the new reservoir.

The park is now a prime recreational destination in northwest Minnesota, visited by tourists from North Dakota and southern Canada as well as Minnesotans. Fishing, swimming, canoeing, and water skiing are popular on the lake, and snowmobiling and cross-country skiing are enjoyed during the winter. The park was placed on the National Register of Historic Places in 1989. The Lake Bronson Archeological Site is nearby.

== In popular culture ==
The park is continually mentioned in David Robbins' Endworld series of books, as it is the home of the Family (the main characters in the Series) known as The Home.
