= Karen Anderson (politician) =

American politician

Karen A. Anderson

Member of the North Dakota House of Representatives
- Incumbent
- Assumed office 2022
- Constituency: 19th district (2022–present)

Personal details
- Party: Republican
- Spouse(s): Vance (1981-2017), Ron (2020-present)
- Children: 2
- Profession: Retired farmer, now licensed Hairdresser
- Website: https://votekarenanderson.com

Karen A. Anderson is an American politician in the state of North Dakota. She is a member of the North Dakota House of Representatives, representing the 19th district. She won the seat in the 2022 election with fellow Republican David Monson against Democratic candidates Jill Hipsher and Lynnell Popowski.

== Biography ==
Anderson has previously been a Walsh County commissioner, and is currently Vice President of the North Dakota County Commissioners Association. She is associated with Concerned Women for America of ND; Walsh County Veterans Memorial Foundation, Walsh County Farm Bureau, Walsh County Farm Bureau; Board, Pregnancy Help Center; Board, Tri-County Domestic Violence, and Legion Auxiliary. She is a member of Grafton Assembly of God Church.

== House ==
Anderson serves on the Human Services and Transportation Committees.
