= KNDK (AM) =

Talk/country music radio station in Langdon, North Dakota, United States

Coordinates: 48°47′9″N 98°21′58″W

- Langdon, North Dakota; United States
- Frequency: 1080 kHz
- Branding: KNDK

Programming
- Format: Talk radio
- Affiliations: Fox News Radio; Premiere Networks; Westwood One; Winnipeg Jets (NHL)

Ownership
- Owner: Simmons Broadcasting; (KNDK, Inc.)
- Sister stations: KAOC, KLME, KYTZ

History
- First air date: September 7, 1967
- Call sign meaning: North Dakota

Technical information
- Licensing authority: FCC
- Facility ID: 35211
- Class: D
- Power: 1,000 watts day 45 watts night
- Translator: 98.7 K254DC (Langdon)

Links
- Public license information: Public file; LMS
- Website: KNDK Online

KNDK (1080 kHz) is an AM radio station serving Langdon, North Dakota. Owned by Simmons Broadcasting, it broadcasts a news/talk format, consisting primarily of syndicated programming (primarily from Fox News Radio, and local agricultural news programs. All four Simmons Broadcasting stations share studios at 1403 Third Street in Langdon, ND. It serves as the only American affiliate station of the Winnipeg Jets of the National Hockey League.

1080 AM is a United States clear channel frequency; KOAN, KRLD, and WTIC share Class A status on this frequency.

Former logo

In 2022, KNDK briefly replaced the talk portion of its format with farm news and shifted its music to classic country. It has since returned to a news/talk format.
