= Grafton, North Dakota =

City in the United States

- City
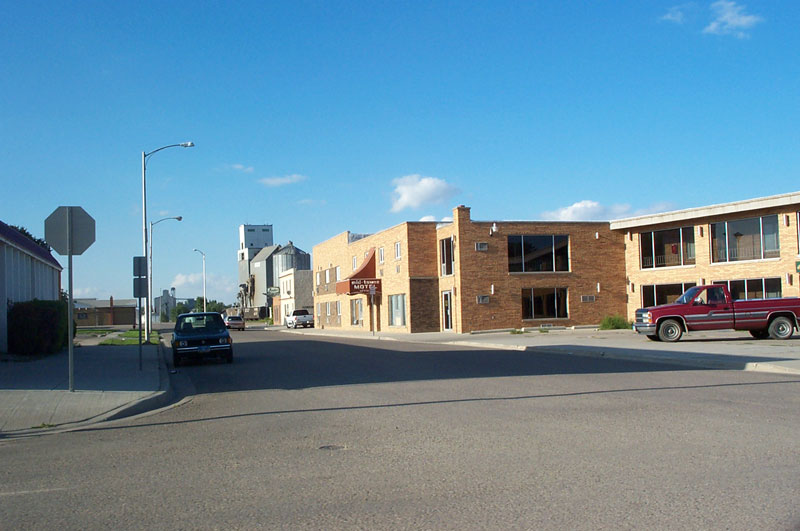
- Downtown Grafton

- Seal
- Interactive map of Grafton, North Dakota
- Coordinates: 48.41391°N 97.406164°W
- Country: United States
- State: North Dakota
- County: Walsh
- Founded: 1881
- Incorporated (village): 1881
- Incorporated (town): May 22, 1882
- Incorporated (city): 1903

Government
  - Type: Mayor–Council
  - Mayor: Chris West
  - City Council: 1st Ward: Kylen Kostrzewski; 2nd Ward: Greg Young; 3rd Ward: Philip (Phil) Ray; 4th Ward: Darrin Wollitz
  - At-large: Brad Burianek; Donavon McMillian; Marry Jaster; Loree Osowski

Area
  - Total: 3.566 sq mi (9.236 km^{2})
  - Land: 3.303 sq mi (8.554 km^{2})
  - Water: 0.263 sq mi (0.681 km^{2}) 7.38%
- Elevation: 827 ft (252 m)

Population (2020)
  - Total: 4,170
  - Estimate (2024): 4,027
  - Density: 1,219.3/sq mi (470.79/km^{2})
- Time zone: UTC–6 (Central (CST))
  - Summer (DST): UTC–5 (CDT)
- ZIP Code: 58237
- Area code: 701
- FIPS code: 38-31820
- GNIS feature ID: 1036063
- Highways: US 81, ND 17
- Website: graftonnd.gov

Grafton is a city in and the county seat of Walsh County, North Dakota, United States. The population was 4,170 at the 2020 census, and was estimated at 4,027 in 2024, making it the 16th-most populous city in North Dakota.

== History ==
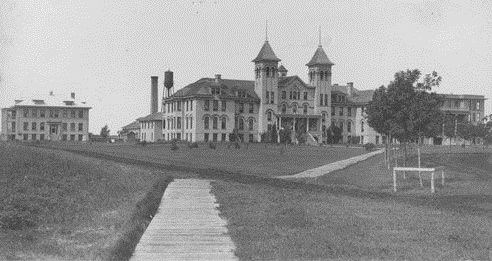
Grafton State School in the early 1900s

Grafton was founded in 1881 and US Highway 81 and North Dakota Highway 17 are the two major highways that run through the city.

The Grafton area was homesteaded by Nils Monson. Nils Monson was a 29-year-old bachelor who walked to the area from Winnipeg in the fall of 1878 to homestead. He was the first to deed his 160-acre homestead to the town. The Grafton area was later settled by Thomas E. Cooper in early 1879. He became postmaster later that year when a post office was constructed as part of expansions in service for the Northern Pacific Railway and the Great Northern Railway. Grafton was founded in 1881. It was incorporated as a village in 1881 and then became a city in 1903. In 1881, Walsh County was established and Grafton was subsequently designated the county seat. The city was named for Grafton County, New Hampshire, the native home of a large share of its early settlers.

The Grafton State School, a home for the developmentally disabled, is listed on the National Register of Historic Places.

== Government ==
The city employs a mayor-council government where the mayor is elected for a four-year term and eight city council members are elected to staggered four-year terms. There are four at-large members of the city council while the remaining four members are elected from the four wards of the city. Currently, Chris West is serving as mayor while the city council members are as follows: David Fellman (1st Ward), Greg Young (2nd Ward), Philip Ray (3rd Ward), Don Hutson (4th Ward), Brad Burianek (At-large), Donavon McMillian (At-large), Brian Sieben (At-large), and Loree Osowski (At-large).

== Geography ==
According to the United States Census Bureau, the city has a total area of 3.566 square miles (9.24 km^{2}), of which 3.303 square miles (8.55 km^{2}) is land and 0.263 square miles (0.68 km^{2}) (7.38%) is water.

=== Climate ===
Climate data for Grafton, North Dakota (1981–2010)
Month	Jan	Feb	Mar	Apr	May	Jun	Jul	Aug	Sep	Oct	Nov	Dec	Year
Mean daily maximum °F (°C)	15.7 (−9.1)	22.1 (−5.5)	34.5 (1.4)	54.3 (12.4)	69.1 (20.6)	77.7 (25.4)	81.8 (27.7)	80.8 (27.1)	70.3 (21.3)	53.9 (12.2)	34.8 (1.6)	19.9 (−6.7)	51.4 (10.8)
Mean daily minimum °F (°C)	−0.2 (−17.9)	5.7 (−14.6)	19.1 (−7.2)	33.7 (0.9)	46.2 (7.9)	56.2 (13.4)	60.5 (15.8)	58.4 (14.7)	48.7 (9.3)	36.0 (2.2)	20.7 (−6.3)	5.2 (−14.9)	32.6 (0.3)
Average precipitation inches (mm)	0.51 (13)	0.65 (17)	0.90 (23)	1.10 (28)	2.66 (68)	3.74 (95)	3.01 (76)	2.65 (67)	1.75 (44)	1.64 (42)	0.89 (23)	0.51 (13)	20.01 (508)
Average snowfall inches (cm)	7.0 (18)	5.1 (13)	5.3 (13)	2.2 (5.6)	0.1 (0.25)	0.0 (0.0)	0.0 (0.0)	0.0 (0.0)	0.0 (0.0)	0.6 (1.5)	5.1 (13)	6.5 (17)	32.0 (81)
Source: NOAA

== Demographics ==
Historical population
Census	Pop.	Note	%±
1890	1,594		—
1900	2,378		49.2%
1910	2,229		−6.3%
1920	2,512		12.7%
1930	3,136		24.8%
1940	4,070		29.8%
1950	4,901		20.4%
1960	5,885		20.1%
1970	5,946		1.0%
1980	5,293		−11.0%
1990	4,840		−8.6%
2000	4,516		−6.7%
2010	4,284		−5.1%
2020	4,170		−2.7%
2024 (est.)	4,027		−3.4%
U.S. Decennial Census; 2020 Census

=== Racial and ethnic composition ===
Grafton, North Dakota – racial and ethnic composition Note: the US Census treats Hispanic/Latino as an ethnic category. This table excludes Latinos from the racial categories and assigns them to a separate category. Hispanics/Latinos may be of any race.
Race / ethnicity (NH = non-Hispanic)	Pop. 1980	Pop. 1990	Pop. 2000	Pop. 2010	Pop. 2020
White alone (NH)	5,080 (95.98%)	4,471 (92.38%)	3,970 (87.91%)	3,486 (81.37%)	2,948 (70.70%)
Black or African American alone (NH)	0 (0.00%)	6 (0.12%)	9 (0.20%)	14 (0.34%)	50 (1.20%)
Native American or Alaska Native alone (NH)	162 (3.06%)	64 (1.32%)	58 (1.28%)	110 (2.57%)	70 (1.68%)
Asian alone (NH)	0 (0.00%)	40 (0.83%)	15 (0.33%)	19 (0.44%)	33 (0.79%)
Pacific Islander alone (NH)	—	—	0 (0.00%)	4 (0.09%)	0 (0.00%)
Other race alone (NH)	31 (0.59%)	0 (0.00%)	1 (0.02%)	0 (0.00%)	14 (0.33%)
Mixed race or multiracial (NH)	—	—	31 (0.69%)	49 (1.14%)	143 (3.43%)
Hispanic or Latino (any race)	20 (0.38%)	259 (5.35%)	432 (9.57%)	602 (14.05%)	912 (21.87%)
Total	5,293 (100.00%)	4,840 (100.00%)	4,516 (100.00%)	4,284 (100.00%)	4,170 (100.00%)

=== 2020 census ===
As of the 2020 census, there were 4,170 people, 1,738 households, and 986 families residing in the city. The population density was 1,262.49 inhabitants per square mile (487.5/km^{2}). There were 1,966 housing units at an average density of 595.22 per square mile (229.8/km^{2}).

The median age was 41.3 years. 23.3% of residents were under the age of 18 and 21.4% were 65 years of age or older. For every 100 females, there were 96.0 males; for every 100 females age 18 and over, there were 95.5 males.

0.0% of residents lived in urban areas, while 100.0% lived in rural areas.

26.6% of households had children under the age of 18 living in them. Of all households, 41.5% were married-couple households, 21.3% had a male householder with no spouse or partner present, and 28.5% had a female householder with no spouse or partner present. About 37.4% of all households were made up of individuals, and 16.9% had someone living alone who was 65 years of age or older.

11.6% of housing units were vacant. The homeowner vacancy rate was 2.5% and the rental vacancy rate was 13.0%.

=== Demographic estimates ===
As of the 2023 American Community Survey, the city has a median household income of $60,184. Approximately 10.4% of the population lives at or below the poverty line. Grafton has an estimated _% employment rate, with 18.0% of the population holding a bachelor's degree or higher and 84.4% holding a high school diploma.

The top five reported languages (people were allowed to report up to two languages, thus the figures will generally add to more than 100%) were English (_%), Spanish (_%), Indo-European (_%), Asian and Pacific Islander (_%), and Other (_%).

=== Housing ===
According to realtor website Zillow, the average price of a home as of September 30, 2025, in Grafton is $164,709.

=== 2010 census ===
As of the 2010 census, there were 4,284 people, 1,776 households, and 1,073 families residing in the city. The population density was 1,365.20 inhabitants per square mile (527.1/km^{2}). There were 1,990 housing units at an average density of 634.16 inhabitants per square mile (244.9/km^{2}). The racial makeup of the city was 89.22% White, 0.35% African American, 2.82% Native American, 0.44% Asian, 0.09% Pacific Islander, 5.42% from other races, and 1.66% from two or more races. Hispanic or Latino of any race were 14.05% of the population.

There were 1,776 households out of which 27.6% had children under the age of 18 living with them, 45.4% were married couples living together, 10.2% had a female householder with no husband present, 4.8% had a male householder with no wife present, and 39.6% were non-families. 35.2% of all households were made up of individuals, and 15.4% had someone living alone who was 65 years of age or older. The average household size was 2.27 and the average family size was 2.92.

The median age in the city was 42.5 years. 23.5% of residents were under the age of 18; 8.1% were between the ages of 18 and 24; 21.5% were from 25 to 44; 27.7% were from 45 to 64; and 19.2% were 65 years of age or older. The gender makeup of the city was 48.4% male and 51.6% female.

=== 2000 census ===
As of the 2000 census, there were 4,516 people, 1,804 households, and 1,143 families residing in the city. The population density was 506.9 inhabitants per square mile (195.7/km^{2}). There were 2,005 housing units at an average density of 225.0 inhabitants per square mile (86.9/km^{2}). The racial makeup of the city was 91.67% White, 0.58% African American, 1.35% Native American, 0.38% Asian, 4.69% from other races, and 1.33% from two or more races. Hispanic or Latino of any race were 9.57% of the population.

The top 6 ancestry groups in the city are Norwegian (39.4%), German (19.8%), French (8.9%), Polish (8.7%), Czech (8.3%), Irish (7.4%).

There were 1,804 households out of which 31.2% had children under the age of 18 living with them, 49.6% were married couples living together, 10.4% had a female householder with no husband present, and 36.6% were non-families. 33.1% of all households were made up of individuals and 16.6% had someone living alone who was 65 years of age or older. The average household size was 2.35 and the average family size was 2.98.

In the city the population was spread out with 24.2% under the age of 18, 7.4% from 18 to 24, 26.3% from 25 to 44, 23.1% from 45 to 64, and 19.0% who were 65 years of age or older. The median age was 40 years. For every 100 females there were 92.3 males. For every 100 females age 18 and over, there were 89.1 males.

The median income for a household in the city was $33,231, and the median income for a family was $41,747. Males had a median income of $28,321 versus $20,433 for females. The per capita income for the city was $16,644. About 8.3% of families and 12.2% of the population were below the poverty line, including 11.7% of those under age 18 and 7.1% of those age 65 or over.

== Education ==
The city of Grafton is served by the Grafton Public Schools system. The system includes Century Primary Elementary School (grades Pre-K–2), Century Intermediate Elementary School grades (3–6) Grafton Junior High School (grades 7–8), and Grafton High School (grades 9–12).

North Valley Career and Technology Center is a multi-district regional technology education center, serving students grades 9–12 from across the region.

== Library ==
Grafton's Carnegie Regional Library opened in 1897 and is North Dakota's first public library. Carnegie's collection contains 49,005 volumes and circulates 33,620 items per year. The library, including its 3 branches, serves a population of over 27,000 residents.

== Media ==
=== Local print and online news ===
- Walsh County Record
- Walsh County Daily News

=== Local radio ===
==== AM radio ====
AM radio stations
Frequency	Call sign	Name	Format	Owner	City
1340 AM	KXPO	Expo Radio	Full service/Country	Simmons Broadcasting Inc.	Grafton

==== FM radio ====
FM radio stations
Frequency	Call sign	Name	Format	Owner	Target city/market	City of license
100.9 FM	KAUJ	Oldies 101	Oldies	Simmons Broadcasting Inc.	Grafton	Grafton

== Sites of interest ==
- Walsh County Courthouse – The Walsh County Courthouse has been listed on the National Register of Historic Places since 1985.
- Centennial Center
- Elmwood historic home
- Fair Oaks Golf Club – a nine-hole golf course located in Grafton
- Grafton Winter Sports Arena – site of the former Winter Sports Arena, the first indoor hockey arena in North Dakota.
- Chandler Field – named after Albert "Happy" Chandler
- Leistikow Park

== Notable people ==
- Karen Anderson, state legislator
- Albert "Happy" Chandler, 44th and 49th governor of Kentucky; US senator; commissioner of Major League Baseball
- Pablo Garza, mixed martial arts featherweight fighter with the Ultimate Fighting Championship
- William E. Gorder, teacher, farmer, and North Dakota state representative
- Les Lear, offensive tackle in the Canadian Football League and National Football League
- Raymond W. Lessard, bishop of Savannah (1973–1995)
- Clint Ritchie, actor (Clint Buchanan on One Life to Live)
- Barry Tallackson, forward for the St. Louis Blues
