= Langdon, North Dakota =

- City
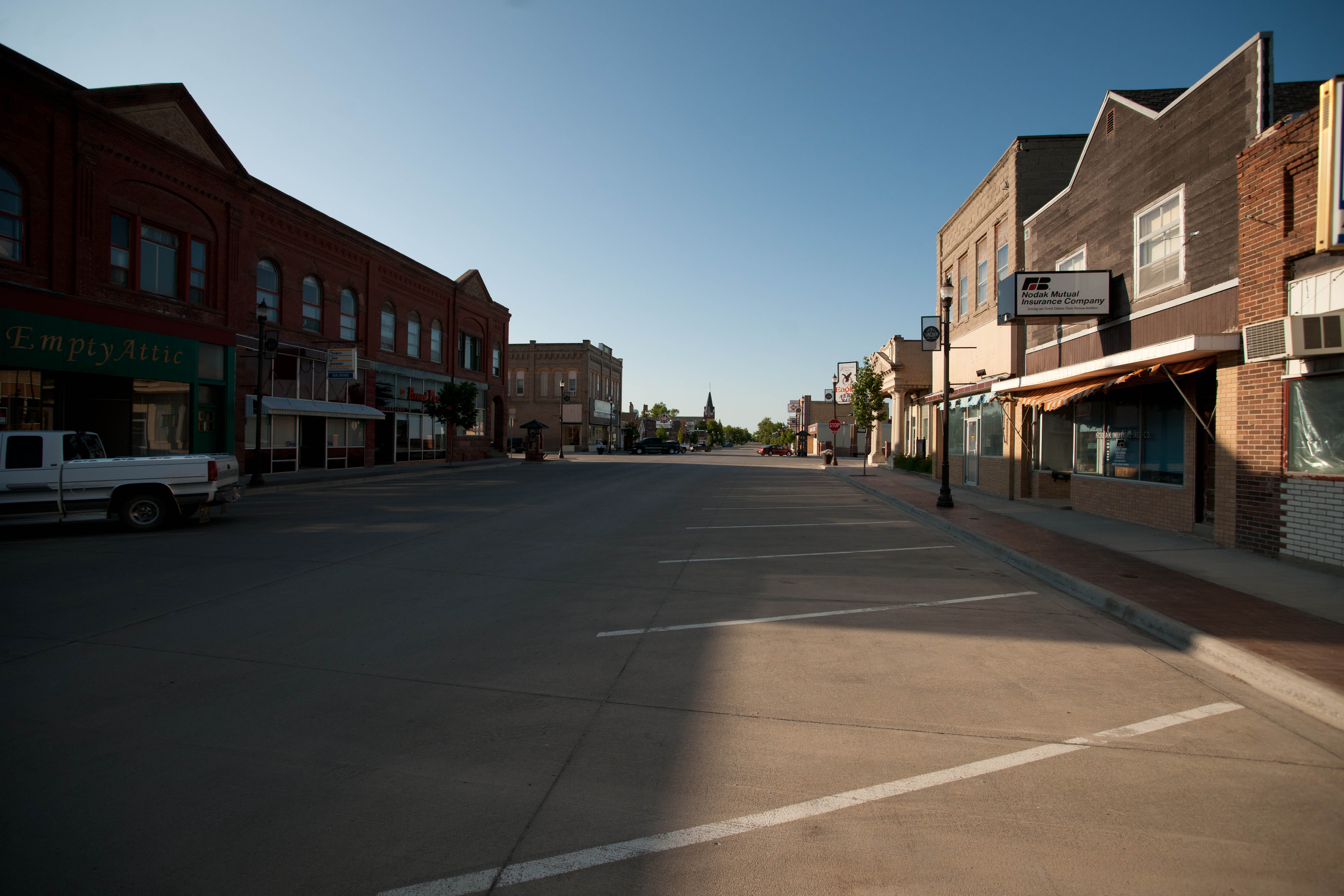
- Business district of Langdon

- Logo

- Location of Langdon, North Dakota
- Coordinates: 48°45′45″N 98°22′29″W
- Country: United States
- State: North Dakota
- County: Cavalier
- Founded: 1885
- Incorporated: February 25, 1888

Government
  - Mayor: Jerry Nowatzki

Area
  - Total: 1.579 sq mi (4.090 km^{2})
  - Land: 1.547 sq mi (4.007 km^{2})
  - Water: 0.032 sq mi (0.082 km^{2})
- Elevation: 1,611 ft (491 m)

Population (2020)
  - Total: 1,909
  - Estimate (2023): 1,847
  - Density: 1,190/sq mi (461/km^{2})
- Time zone: UTC–6 (Central (CST))
  - Summer (DST): UTC–5 (CDT)
- ZIP Code: 58249
- Area code: 701
- FIPS code: 38-44780
- GNIS feature ID: 1036117
- Highways: ND 1, ND 5
- Sales tax: 7.0%
- Website: cityoflangdon.com

Langdon is a city in Cavalier County, North Dakota, United States. It is the county seat of Cavalier County. The population was 1,909 at the 2020 census. Langdon was designated as the county seat in 1884, was founded in 1885, and was incorporated on February 25, 1888.

== History ==
A post office has been in operation in Langdon since 1886. The city was named for Robert Bruce Langdon, a politician and railroad official.

On October 29, 1887, The Courier, an early Langdon newspaper, reported that Rosa Lake, Lemon, Olga, and Langdon were all vying for the position of county seat. Anecdotal stories tell of several settlers who succeeded in voting several times by simply changing their hats and coats. When all votes were tallied, it was found that Langdon had polled 301 votes, Olga 246, Rosa Lake 55, and Lemon 11. It was alleged that the Langdon precinct had cast 150 votes with a total of only 50 qualified voters. However, the county seat remained in Langdon.

== Geography ==
According to the United States Census Bureau, the city has a total area of 1.579 square miles (4.09 km^{2}), of which 1.547 square miles (4.01 km^{2}) is land and 0.032 square miles (0.08 km^{2}) is water.

=== Climate ===
This climatic region is typified by large seasonal temperature differences, with warm to hot (and often humid) summers and cold (sometimes severely cold) winters. According to the Köppen Climate Classification system, Langdon has a warm-summer humid continental climate, abbreviated "Dwb" on climate maps.

On Memorial Day (then called Decoration Day) 1909, a tornado struck on the prairie a mile to a mile and a half southeast of Langdon, then moved seven miles in a northwest direction. The tornado, locally dubbed The Vulcan, killed five people and injured 29. The Vulcan was part of an outbreak of tornadoes called the Decoration Day Massacre, the second deadliest tornado outbreak in North Dakota's recorded history, killing 12 people in Langdon and surrounding communities.

In Langdon, Mrs. M.L. Sullivan ran for safety but the tornado hit as she arrived at her cellar door. When the winds subsided, she was standing in the cellar with its broken doorknob in her hand. Katie Diamond was lifted above treetops and telephone poles, and then dropped in a yard, virtually unscathed. The tornado destroyed many barns, two elevators, the Great Northern water tank and several feet of railroad track.

Langdon, North Dakota, was the epicenter of the cold wave of 1936: it remained below freezing (day and night) for 92 consecutive days; from November 30 through February 29 Langdon’s warmest February temperature was a frigid 15 °F (−9.4 °C). Langdon holds the record for most consecutive days below 0 °F (−17.8 °C) at 41 consecutive days, January 11 though February 20 of 1936. This is a record for any location in the contiguous U.S.

Climate data for Langdon, North Dakota (1991–2020 normals, extremes 1897–present)
Month	Jan	Feb	Mar	Apr	May	Jun	Jul	Aug	Sep	Oct	Nov	Dec	Year
Record high °F (°C)	52 (11)	59 (15)	77 (25)	97 (36)	111 (44)	106 (41)	112 (44)	102 (39)	103 (39)	91 (33)	74 (23)	64 (18)	112 (44)
Mean maximum °F (°C)	34.4 (1.3)	35.0 (1.7)	48.3 (9.1)	69.5 (20.8)	82.8 (28.2)	85.9 (29.9)	86.6 (30.3)	89.9 (32.2)	85.1 (29.5)	74.3 (23.5)	51.7 (10.9)	37.6 (3.1)	91.9 (33.3)
Mean daily maximum °F (°C)	12.5 (−10.8)	17.1 (−8.3)	29.8 (−1.2)	48.0 (8.9)	63.5 (17.5)	71.9 (22.2)	76.6 (24.8)	76.5 (24.7)	67.3 (19.6)	50.9 (10.5)	32.3 (0.2)	18.2 (−7.7)	47.1 (8.4)
Daily mean °F (°C)	3.7 (−15.7)	7.6 (−13.6)	20.9 (−6.2)	37.8 (3.2)	51.9 (11.1)	61.7 (16.5)	66.2 (19.0)	65.1 (18.4)	55.7 (13.2)	40.7 (4.8)	24.0 (−4.4)	10.2 (−12.1)	37.1 (2.8)
Mean daily minimum °F (°C)	−5.0 (−20.6)	−2.0 (−18.9)	12.0 (−11.1)	27.6 (−2.4)	40.4 (4.7)	51.6 (10.9)	55.8 (13.2)	53.8 (12.1)	44.0 (6.7)	30.6 (−0.8)	15.7 (−9.1)	2.2 (−16.6)	27.2 (−2.7)
Mean minimum °F (°C)	−27.6 (−33.1)	−24.4 (−31.3)	−11.7 (−24.3)	10.9 (−11.7)	25.6 (−3.6)	39.0 (3.9)	44.2 (6.8)	41.7 (5.4)	28.8 (−1.8)	14.8 (−9.6)	−3.1 (−19.5)	−19.8 (−28.8)	−29.8 (−34.3)
Record low °F (°C)	−50 (−46)	−51 (−46)	−40 (−40)	−15 (−26)	6 (−14)	24 (−4)	30 (−1)	28 (−2)	7 (−14)	−7 (−22)	−31 (−35)	−42 (−41)	−51 (−46)
Average precipitation inches (mm)	0.45 (11)	0.36 (9.1)	0.59 (15)	1.14 (29)	3.13 (80)	4.17 (106)	3.44 (87)	2.45 (62)	2.11 (54)	1.52 (39)	0.75 (19)	0.64 (16)	20.75 (527)
Average snowfall inches (cm)	8.2 (21)	6.1 (15)	6.1 (15)	4.4 (11)	1.2 (3.0)	0.0 (0.0)	0.0 (0.0)	0.0 (0.0)	0.0 (0.0)	2.6 (6.6)	8.1 (21)	10.6 (27)	47.3 (120)
Average precipitation days (≥ 0.01 in)	7.5	5.4	6.1	5.9	11.1	12.9	10.8	9.3	8.4	7.8	6.4	7.3	98.9
Average snowy days (≥ 0.1 in)	7.6	5.5	4.5	1.9	0.4	0.0	0.0	0.0	0.0	1.4	5.2	7.4	33.9
Source: NOAA

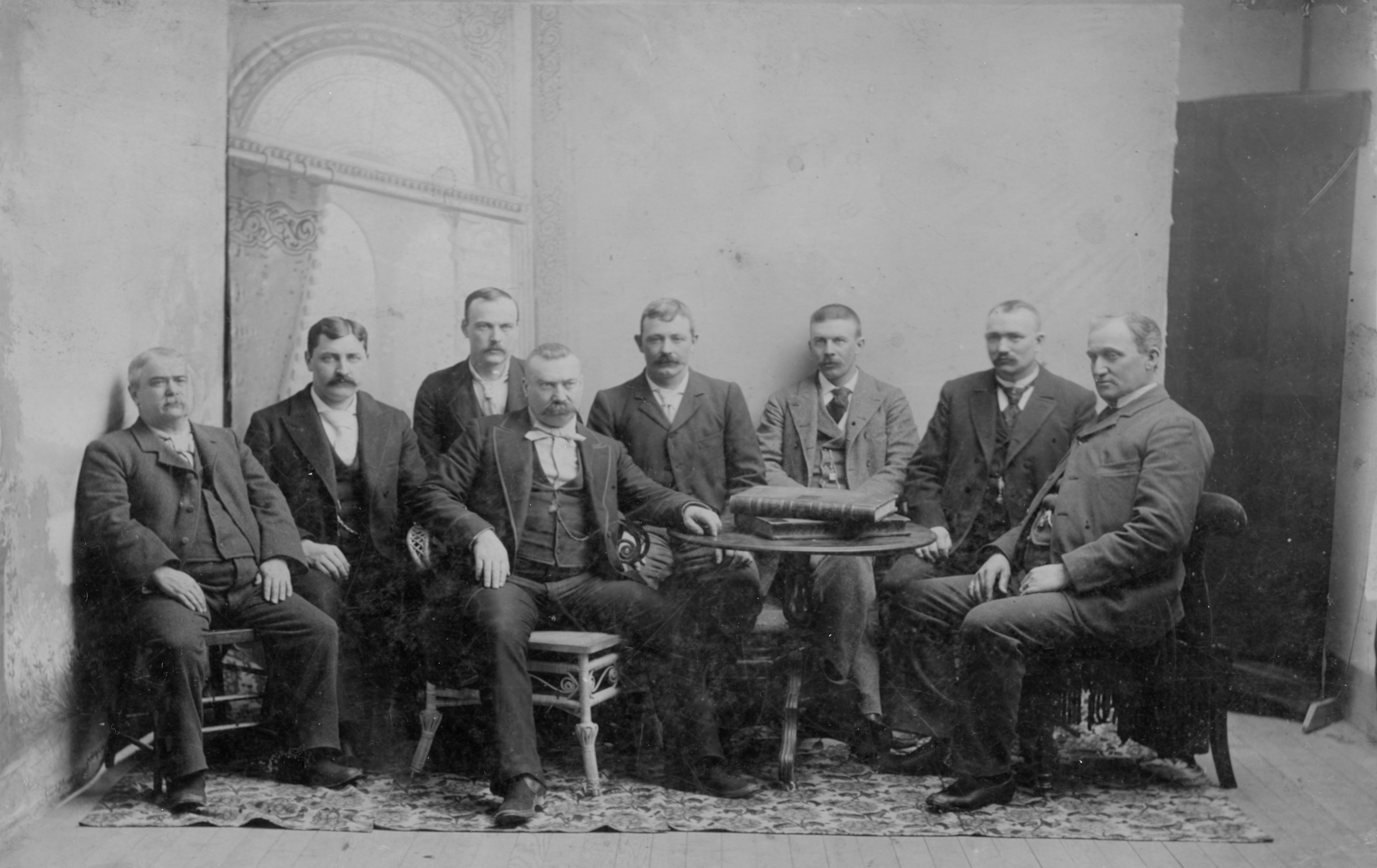
City Council of Langdon, North Dakota, 1894

== Demographics ==
Historical population
Census	Pop.	Note	%±
1890	291		—
1900	1,188		308.2%
1910	1,214		2.2%
1920	1,228		1.2%
1930	1,221		−0.6%
1940	1,546		26.6%
1950	1,838		18.9%
1960	2,151		17.0%
1970	2,182		1.4%
1980	2,335		7.0%
1990	2,241		−4.0%
2000	2,101		−6.2%
2010	1,878		−10.6%
2020	1,909		1.7%
2023 (est.)	1,847		−3.2%
U.S. Decennial Census; 2020 Census

=== 2020 census ===
Langdon Racial Composition
Race	Number	Percent
White (NH)	1,777	93.1%
Black or African American (NH)	0	0.0%
Native American (NH)	15	0.8%
Asian (NH)	9	0.5%
Pacific Islander (NH)	0	0.0%
Some Other Race (NH)	7	0.4%
Mixed/Multi-Racial (NH)	67	3.5%
Hispanic or Latino	34	1.8%
Total	1,909	100.0%

As of the 2020 census, there were 1,909 people, 862 households, and 486 families residing in the city. There were 1,016 housing units. The racial makeup of the city was 94.1% White, 0.1% African American, 0.8% Native American, 0.5% Asian, 0.0% Pacific Islander, 0.7% from some other races and 3.9% from two or more races. Hispanic or Latino of any race were 1.8% of the population.

=== 2010 census ===
As of the 2010 census, there were 1,878 people, 894 households, and 506 families living in the city. The population density was 1,138.2 inhabitants per square mile (439.5/km^{2}). There were 1,057 housing units at an average density of 640.6 per square mile (247.3/km^{2}). The racial makeup of the city was 97.2% White, 0.2% African American, 0.7% Native American, 0.2% Asian, 0.1% Pacific Islander, 0.4% from other races, and 1.2% from two or more races. Hispanic or Latino of any race were 0.8% of the population.

There were 894 households, of which 21.4% had children under the age of 18 living with them, 49.0% were married couples living together, 5.5% had a female householder with no husband present, 2.1% had a male householder with no wife present, and 43.4% were non-families. 40.0% of all households were made up of individuals, and 23.8% had someone living alone who was 65 years of age or older. The average household size was 2.04 and the average family size was 2.73.

The median age in the city was 50.1 years. 19.1% of residents were under the age of 18; 5.9% were between the ages of 18 and 24; 17.9% were from 25 to 44; 28.5% were from 45 to 64; and 28.5% were 65 years of age or older. The gender makeup of the city was 47.9% male and 52.1% female.

=== 2000 census ===
As of the 2000 census, there were 2,101 people, 917 households, and 565 families living in the city. The population density was 1,233.1 inhabitants per square mile (476.1/km^{2}). There were 1,178 housing units at an average density of 691.4 per square mile (267.0/km^{2}). The racial makeup of the city was 98.57% White, 0.14% African American, 0.29% Native American, 0.10% Asian, 0.14% from other races, and 0.76% from two or more races. Hispanic or Latino of any race were 0.76% of the population.

There were 917 households, out of which 26.3% had children under the age of 18 living with them, 54.4% were married couples living together, 5.1% had a female householder with no husband present, and 38.3% were non-families. 36.6% of all households were made up of individuals, and 22.6% had someone living alone who was 65 years of age or older. The average household size was 2.20 and the average family size was 2.89.

In the city, the population was spread out, with 23.2% under the age of 18, 4.1% from 18 to 24, 20.9% from 25 to 44, 23.3% from 45 to 64, and 28.4% who were 65 years of age or older. The median age was 46 years. For every 100 females, there were 87.6 males. For every 100 females age 18 and over, there were 84.1 males.

The median income for a household in the city was $28,839, and the median income for a family was $37,121. Males had a median income of $31,010 versus $19,342 for females. The per capita income for the city was $15,670. About 4.9% of families and 8.8% of the population were below the poverty line, including 10.3% of those under age 18 and 11.9% of those age 65 or over.

== Education ==
Langdon's high school underwent a name change because of surrounding schools closing. The school was renamed "Langdon Area High School" (instead of "Langdon High School") in the fall of 2001. The official mascot of Langdon Area High School is the Cardinal.

Students from Langdon Area Schools perform better than state averages in several areas. Graduation rates, for example, typically exceed state averages by several points. Since 2005, in all areas where comparable statistics were available, Langdon outperformed state averages from 4.5% to 15.4%.

Langdon's students also tend to outperform their District's Adequate Yearly Progress goals in both the proficiency and participation categories. In some cases, these differences are quite significant. For example, the District's 2007–2008 proficiency goal in mathematics was 65.5%, whereas the district's actual proficiency was measured at 97.7%, a difference of 32.2%. A similarly large difference can be seen in reading proficiency scores. Despite this high achievement, however, the District is not considered by the state to have achieved Annual Yearly Progress in the 2007–2008 school year. However, this may be a statistical anomaly given the District's consistently high performance in previous years. For example, in the 2006–2007 school year, reading participation was 100% and mathematics participation was 99.5%. Even though the 2007–2008 rates in these areas were very high (97.7% in both cases) such a score still represents a decline from previous years. Similar patterns of small declines from already high figures can be seen in the areas of graduation rates (0.4% decline, from 95% to 94.6%) and attendance (0.1% decline, from 97.3% to 97.2%). These small changes may keep the District from being listed as having made adequate yearly progress, despite their high overall proficiency. Additionally, in some areas the 2007–2008 figures represent significant improvement over those from the 2006–2007 school year, where Landgon underperformed state averages in the key areas of reading (−10.2%) and mathematics (−7.4%) proficiency. This indicates a positive trend for the District, although one which will need to reevaluated when the 2008–2009 data become available to determine whether it is part of a larger pattern or not.

In addition to student academic performance, average daily attendance at Langdon Area Schools is slightly higher than the state average (97.2% versus 96.7%), a general pattern which has held true since at least 2005.

== Local media ==
Four radio stations are based in Langdon. Simmons Broadcasting owns and operates; KNDK (AM), KLME, KAOC, and KYTZ.
