= American Legion Hall =

American Legion Hall, Post, Building, Hut, or variations, refers to buildings associated with the American Legion. Such buildings in the United States include:

- American Legion Hall (Searcy, Arkansas)
- American Legion Hut-Des Arc, Des Arc, Arkansas
- American Legion Post No. 121 Building, Paris, Arkansas
- American Legion Post No. 127 Building, Eudora, Arkansas
- American Legion Post No. 131, Leslie, Arkansas
- Beely-Johnson American Legion Post 139, Springdale, Arkansas
- Bunch-Walton Post No. 22 American Legion Hut, Clarksville, Arkansas
- Estes-Williams American Legion Hut No. 61, Yellville, Arkansas
- Hall Morgan Post 83, American Legion Hut, Rison, Arkansas
- Jess Norman Post 166 American Legion Hut, Augusta, Arkansas
- Lynn Shelton American Legion Post No. 27, Fayetteville, Arkansas
- Nashville American Legion Building, Nashville, Arkansas
- Newport American Legion Community Hut, Newport, Arkansas
- Perryville American Legion Building, Perryville, Arkansas
- Riggs-Hamilton American Legion Post No. 20, Russellville, Arkansas
- Willie Lamb Post No. 26 American Legion Hut, Lepanto, Arkansas
- American Legion Post 43, Hollywood, California
- American Legion Post No. 560 (Long Beach, California)
- American Legion Post No. 512 Carmel-by-the-Sea, California
- American Legion Hall (Eads, Colorado)
- American Legion Forest CCC Shelter, Barkhamsted, Connecticut
- Milton-Myers American Legion Post No. 65, Delray Beach, Florida
- American Legion Cabin, Potlatch, Idaho
- American Legion Hall (Shoshone, Idaho)
- John Regan American Legion Hall, Boise, Idaho
- Nampa American Legion Chateau, Nampa, Idaho
- American Legion Memorial Building, Atlantic, Iowa
- Carl L. Caviness Post 102, American Legion, Chariton, Iowa
- Leo Ellis Post No. 22, American Legion Building, Princeton, Missouri
- American Legion Hut (Decatur, Mississippi), Decatur, Mississippi
- American Legion Hall (McGill, Nevada)
- American Legion Hut (Edmond, Oklahoma)
- American Legion Hut (Tahlequah, Oklahoma)
- Cushing American Legion Building, Cushing, Oklahoma
- American Legion Building (Spartanburg, South Carolina)
- American Legion Hut (Hampton, South Carolina)
- Faulkton American Legion Hall, Faulkton, South Dakota
- Fillmore American Legion Hall, Fillmore, Utah
- American Legion Hall (Olympia, Washington)
- Jackson Hole American Legion Post No. 43, Jackson, Wyoming
- Site of Ferdinand Branstetter Post No. 1, American Legion, Van Tassell, Wyoming
- American Legion Post 160 (Smyrna, Georgia)

== See also ==
- List of American Legion buildings
