= List of American Legion buildings =

This is a list of notable buildings associated with the American Legion.

Many hundreds of buildings have an association with the American Legion. This list focuses only on those significant architecturally or otherwise. It includes those documented in the National Register of Historic Places or a similar registry. Names of buildings include "American Legion Hall", "American Legion Post", "Building", "Hut", and variations. American Legion hall buildings are located throughout the United States, and perhaps in associated territories.

A number of NRHP-listed American Legion buildings were designed or built by the Civil Works Administration or the Works Progress Administration, two New Deal programs.

In the United States (ordered by state, then city)

	Building	Image	Dates	Location	City, State	Description
1	Jess Norman Post 166 American Legion Hut		? built 2001 NRHP-listed	35°16′54″N 91°22′4″W	Augusta, Arkansas	Architecture includes square-notching; designed and/or built by the CWA
2	Bunch-Walton Post No. 22 American Legion Hut		1934 built 2007 NRHP-listed	201 Legion St. 35°28′17″N 93°27′29″W	Clarksville, Arkansas	Civil Works Administration-built, Normanesque architecture
3	American Legion Hut-Des Arc		1934 built 1995 NRHP-listed	34°58′34″N 91°29′41″W	Des Arc, Arkansas	WPA Rustic architecture
4	Hall Morgan Post 83, American Legion Hut		1934 built 2003 NRHP-listed	208 Sycamore St. 33°57′30″N 92°11′18″W	Rison, Arkansas	Built by the CWA/WPA in Rustic architecture style
5	American Legion Post No. 127 Building		1934 built 1992 NRHP-listed	33°6′37″N 91°15′50″W	Eudora, Arkansas	Works Progress Administration-built, in Rustic style.
6	Lynn Shelton American Legion Post No. 27		1940 built 1996 NRHP-listed	28 S. College Ave. 36°3′43″N 94°9′26″W	Fayetteville, Arkansas	"Plain traditional" architecture, NRHP-listed
7	Willie Lamb Post No. 26 American Legion Hut		1937 built 2003 NRHP-listed	205 Alexander St. 35°36′44″N 90°19′52″W	Lepanto, Arkansas	Classical Revival architecture; NRHP-listed
8	American Legion Post No. 131		1935 built 1993 NRHP-listed	Center St. W of jct. with Walnut St. 35°49′46″N 92°33′36″W	Leslie, Arkansas	Designed and/or built by Lloyd Harness, WPA; NRHP-listed
9	Nashville American Legion Building		1990 NRHP-listed	AR 27 W of Main St. 33°56′1″N 93°51′1″W	Nashville, Arkansas	"Rubble architecture"; NRHP-listed
10	Newport American Legion Community Hut		1934 built 1992 NRHP-listed	Remmel Park, N of Remmel Ave. 35°36′3″N 91°16′32″W	Newport, Arkansas	Rustic architecture; NRHP-listed
11	American Legion Post No. 121		1934 built 1995 NRHP-listed	near Paris; 35°16′33″N 93°44′3″W	Paris, Arkansas	WPA Rustic architecture, NRHP-listed
12	Perryville American Legion Building		1935 built 1990 NRHP-listed	Plum and Main Sts. 35°0′18″N 92°48′12″W	Perryville, Arkansas	Rustic architecture; NRHP-listed
13	Riggs-Hamilton American Legion Post No. 20		1936 built 1994 NRHP-listed	215 N. Denver Ave. 35°16′48″N 93°8′9″W	Russellville, Arkansas	Rustic architecture; NRHP-listed
14	American Legion Hall (Searcy, Arkansas)		1939 built 1991 NRHP-listed	Jct. of Race and Spruce Sts. 35°15′4″N 91°44′17″W	Searcy, Arkansas	WPA architecture, designed and/or built by the Works Progress Administration
15	Beely-Johnson American Legion Post 139		1934 built 2007 NRHP-listed	200 N. Spring St. 36°11′11″N 94°7′47″W	Springdale, Arkansas	NRHP-listed
16	Estes-Williams American Legion Hut No. 61		1933 built 2001 NRHP-listed	AR 62/412; 36°13′34″N 92°40′49″W	Yellville, Arkansas	Rustic architecture
17	American Legion Post No. 512		City of Carmel-by-the-Sea	Dolores and 8th street	California	The American Legion Post No. 512, is a historic meeting hall at Dolores and 8th street in Carmel-by-the-Sea, California.
18	American Legion Post 43		1929 built LAHCM listed 1989	2035 North Highland Ave.	Hollywood, California	Egyptian Revival architecture designed by Weston & Weston. Known for its association with Hollywood.
19	American Legion Post No. 560 (Long Beach, California)		City of Long Beach-listed	1215 E. 59th St.	Long Beach, California	listed among the Long Beach historic landmarks
20	American Legion Hall (Eads, Colorado)		1938 built 2007 NRHP-listed	near Eads; 38°29′6″N 102°47′17″W	Eads, Colorado	WPA architecture
22	Milton-Myers American Legion Post No. 65		1921 built 1995 NRHP-listed	263 Northeast 5th Avenue; 26°27′57″N 80°4′5″W	Delray Beach, Florida	Mission Revival architecture
23	John Regan American Legion Hall		1939 built 1982 NRHP-listed	401 W. Idaho St. 43°36′18″N 116°11′51″W	Boise, Idaho	Designed by Tourtellotte & Hummel
24	Nampa American Legion Chateau		1931 built 1982 NRHP-listed	1508 2nd St., S. 43°34′34″N 116°33′22″W	Nampa, Idaho	Designed by Tourtellotte & Hummel Chateau-style?
25	American Legion Cabin		1928 built 1986 NRHP-listed	US Alt. 95; 46°55′16″N 116°53′21″W	Potlatch, Idaho	Bungalow/Craftsman architecture
26	American Legion Hall (Shoshone, Idaho)		1928 built 198 NRHP-listed	near Shoshone; 42°56′4″N 114°24′25″W	Shoshone, Idaho	Bungalow/Craftsman architecture
27	American Legion Memorial Building		1939 built 2006 NRHP-listed	201 Poplar St. 41°24′32″N 95°0′50″W	Atlantic, Iowa	Moderne, Art Deco
28	Carl L. Caviness Post 102, American Legion		1925 built 2006 NRHP-listed	201 S. Main St. 41°0′53″N 93°18′31″W	Chariton, Iowa	Designed by William L. Perkins
29	Oak Grove Legion Hut		1933 built 2016 NRHP-listed	414 James St.	Oak Grove, West Carroll Parish, Louisiana	Rustic architecture, houses Oak Grove post
30	Newton County American Legion Post No. 89 Hut		1934 built 2007 NRHP-listed	MS 15 N, 0.4 mi. N of jct. Country Club Rd.	Decatur, Mississippi	Rustic architecture, houses Post No. 89
31	Leo Ellis Post No. 22, American Legion Building		1935 built 1996 NRHP-listed	804 Grant St.	Princeton, Missouri	NRHP-listed
32	American Legion Hall (McGill, Nevada)		1918 built 1994 NRHP-listed	24 Fourth St. 39°24′13″N 114°46′42″W	McGill, Nevada	Bungalow/Craftsman architecture, built by the Nevada Consolidated Copper Co.
33	Cushing American Legion Building		1924 built 2003 NRHP-listed	212 S. Noble	Cushing, Oklahoma	NRHP-listed
34	American Legion Hut (Edmond, Oklahoma)		1937 built 1993 NRHP-listed	Jct. of Fifth and Little Sts., SW corner 35°39′0″N 97°28′47″W	Edmond, Oklahoma	WPA architecture
35	American Legion Hut (Tahlequah, Oklahoma)		1937 built 2006 NRHP-listed	Tehlequah City Park, jct. of E Shawnee St. and N. Brookside Ave. 35°54′47″N 94°58′3″W	Tahlequah, Oklahoma	"WPA Standardized Style"
36	American Legion Hut (Hampton, South Carolina)		1933 built 2000 NRHP-listed	Junction of Hoover St. and Jackson Ave. 32°52′19″N 81°7′3″W	Hampton, South Carolina	NRHP-listed; Single-story, T-shaped cypress log building with truss roof
37	American Legion Building (Spartanburg, South Carolina)		1937 built 2003 NRHP-listed	94 W. Park Dr. 34°56′3″N 81°54′51″W	Spartanburg, South Carolina	NRHP-listed; Colonial Revival style, granite building
38	Faulkton American Legion Hall		1924 built 2005 NRHP-listed	107 Eighth Ave. N 45°2′15″N 99°7′26″W	Faulkton, South Dakota	Late 19th and Early 20th Century American Movements, Commercial Style
39	American Legion Hut		1948 built 2012 NRHP-listed	36°22′56″N 85°19′19″W	Livingston, Tennessee	Surplus World War II Quonset hut
40	American Legion Building		1935 built 2002 NRHP-listed	35°55′34″N 88°27′28″W	Sparta, Tennessee	Classical Revival. The local American Legion post participated in its construction during the Great Depression, and purchased the building in 1946.
41	American Legion Post 24		1878 built 1966 NRHP-listed	400 Cameron Street38°48′21″N 77°2′37″W	Alexandria, Virginia	Gadsby's Tavern hotel addition repurposed as a clubhouse; complex includes a museum.
42	American Legion Hall (Olympia, Washington)		1921 built 1987 NRHP-listed	219 W. Legion Way47°2′35″N 122°54′8″W	Olympia, Washington	NRHP-listed
43	Jackson Hole American Legion Post No. 43		1929 built 2003 NRHP-listed	43°28′55″N 110°45′40″W	Jackson, Wyoming	A log building, designed by Charles Fox
43	Site of Ferdinand Branstetter Post No. 1, American Legion		1969 NRHP-listed	US 20; 42°39′45″N 104°5′36″W	Van Tassell, Wyoming	Site of demolished first post of the American Legion, which in 1969 was hoped to be the future location of an interpretative sign and possibly a restored post building.
