= Nampa American Legion Chateau =

- U.S. National Register of Historic Places
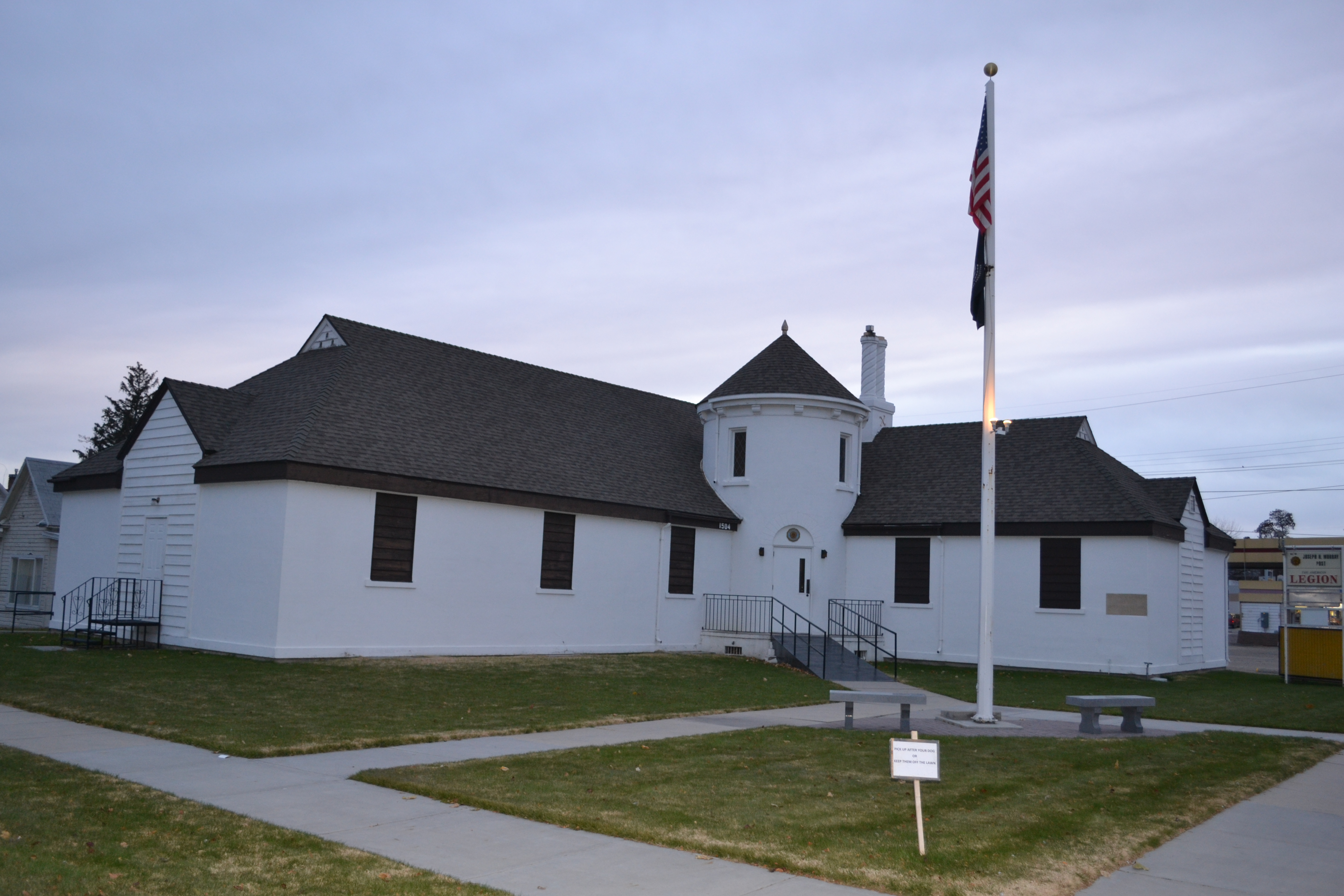

- Location within Idaho Location within the United States
- Location: 1508 2nd St., S., Nampa, Idaho
- Coordinates: 43°34′34″N 116°33′22″W
- Area: less than one acre
- Built: 1931
- Architect: Tourtellotte & Hummel
- MPS: Tourtellotte and Hummel Architecture TR
- NRHP reference No.: 82000326
- Added to NRHP: November 17, 1982

The Nampa American Legion Chateau at 1508 2nd St., S., in Nampa, Idaho, is listed on the National Register of Historic Places. It was designed by Tourtellotte & Hummel in 1931.

It was listed on the National Register of Historic Places in 1982.

It is a "fanciful" and "picturesque" design. The building is one-story and arranged in an L-shape.

== See also ==
- List of American Legion buildings
- National Register of Historic Places listings in Canyon County, Idaho
