= Decatur, Mississippi =

- Town
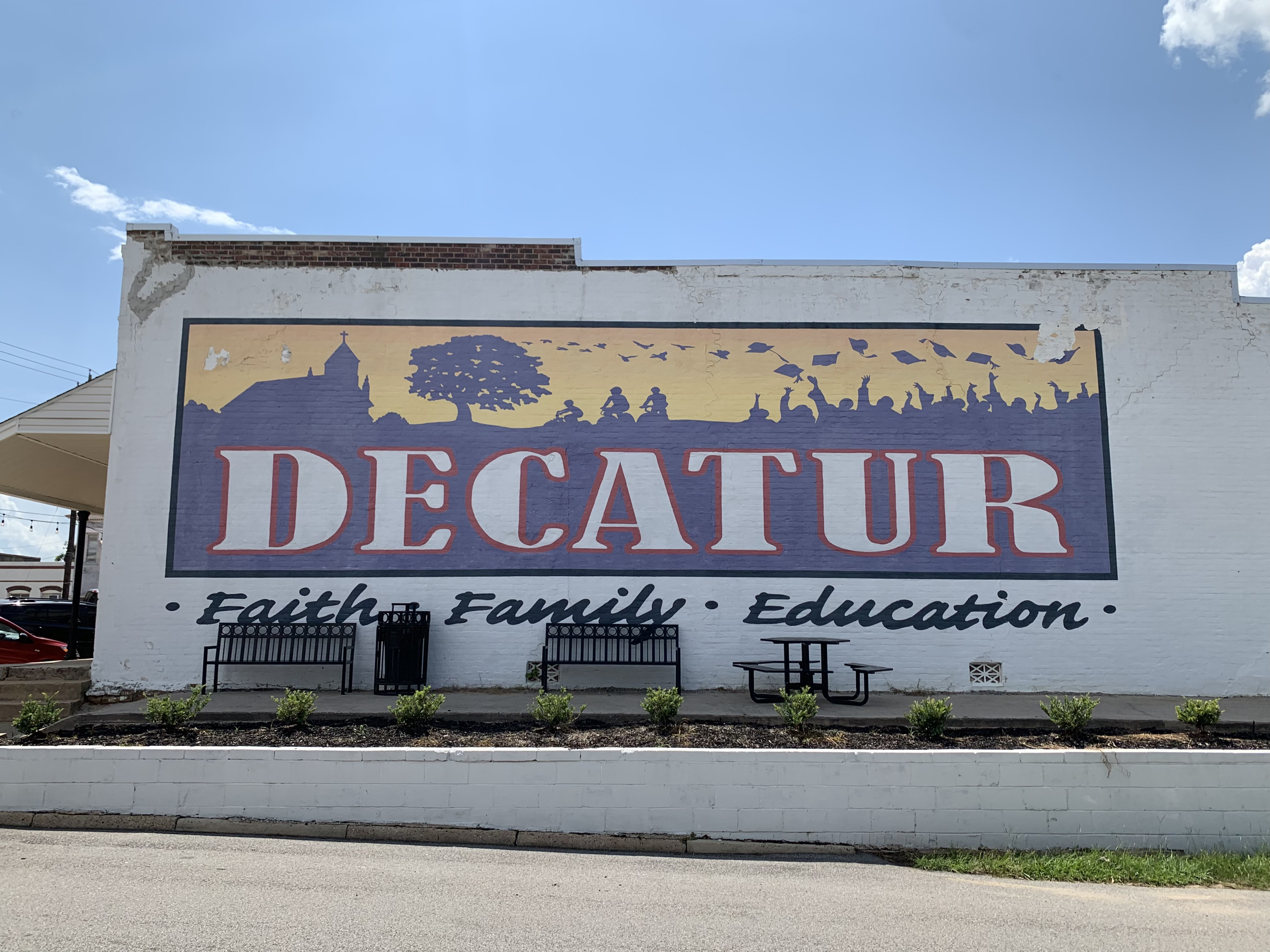
- Mural in downtown Decatur

- Flag
- Nickname: Greater Decatur
- Motto: Faith, Family, Education
- Location of Decatur, Mississippi

- Location in the United States
- Coordinates: 32°26′22″N 89°6′43″W
- Country: United States
- State: Mississippi
- County: Newton

Government
  - Mayor: Lea Ann Rushing

Area
  - Total: 5.56 sq mi (14.40 km^{2})
  - Land: 5.51 sq mi (14.28 km^{2})
  - Water: 0.042 sq mi (0.11 km^{2})
- Elevation: 430 ft (131 m)

Population (2020)
  - Total: 1,945
  - Density: 352.7/sq mi (136.19/km^{2})
- Time zone: UTC-6 (Central (CST))
  - Summer (DST): UTC-5 (CDT)
- ZIP code: 39327
- Area code: 601
- FIPS code: 28-18180
- GNIS feature ID: 0669185
- Website: townofdecaturms.gov

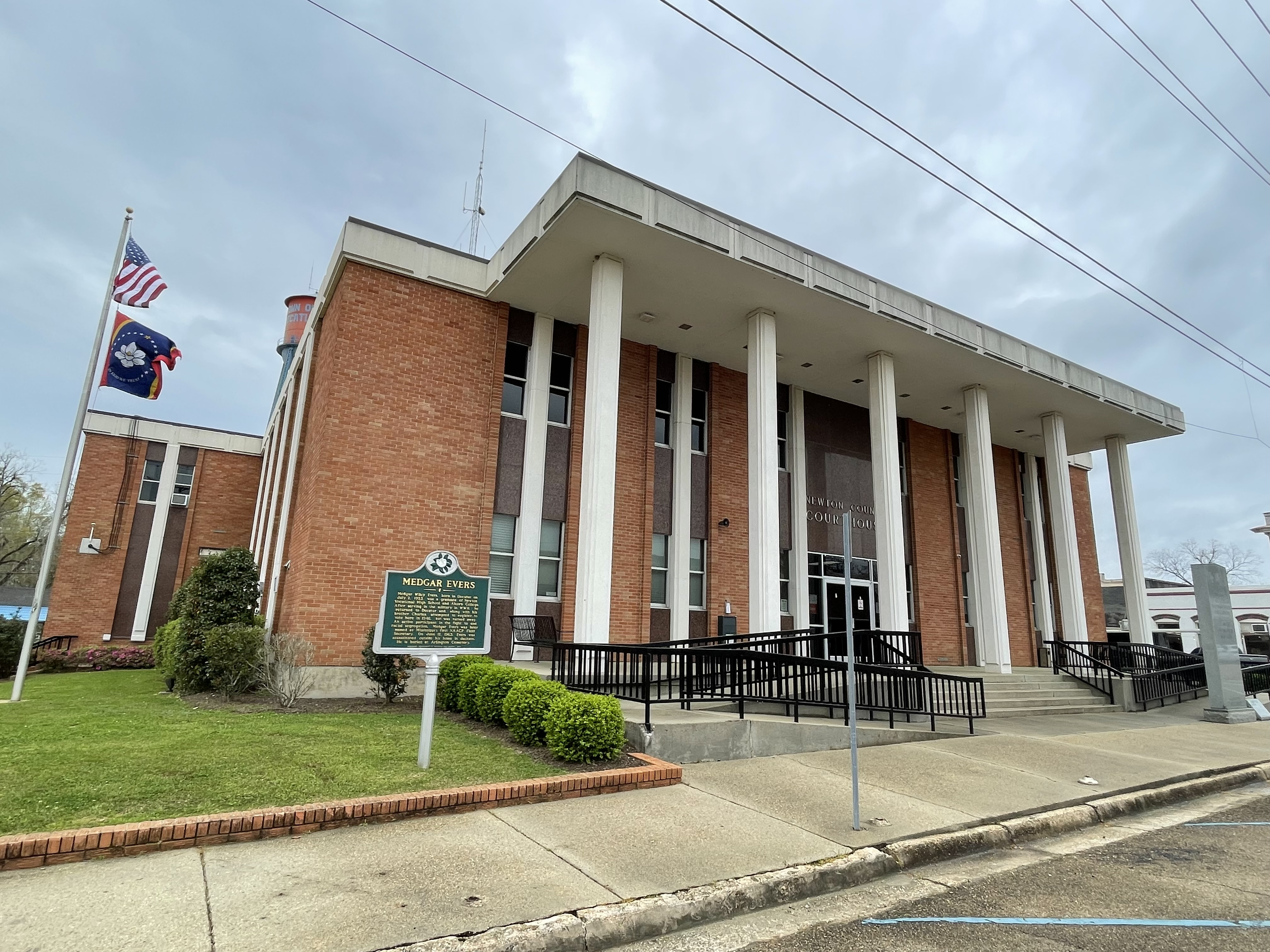
Newton County, Mississippi Court House

Decatur is a town in and the county seat of Newton County, Mississippi. The population was 1,945 in the 2020 census. This town is named after war hero Stephen Decatur Jr.

== History ==
Newton County was created and Decatur established as the county seat in 1836. The Newton County Courthouse was built in Decatur in 1972. It was built by Tatum Concrete Company.

== Geography ==
According to the United States Census Bureau, the town has a total area of 1.0 square mile (2.6 km^{2}), all land.

== Demographics ==
Historical population
Census	Pop.	Note	%±
1880	47		—
1910	283		—
1920	319		12.7%
1930	654		105.0%
1940	773		18.2%
1950	1,225		58.5%
1960	1,340		9.4%
1970	1,311		−2.2%
1980	1,148		−12.4%
1990	1,248		8.7%
2000	1,426		14.3%
2010	1,841		29.1%
2020	1,945		5.6%
U.S. Decennial Census

=== 2020 census ===
As of the 2020 census, Decatur had a population of 1,945. The median age was 21.4 years. 18.2% of residents were under the age of 18 and 10.8% of residents were 65 years of age or older. For every 100 females there were 88.1 males, and for every 100 females age 18 and over there were 87.2 males age 18 and over.

0.0% of residents lived in urban areas, while 100.0% lived in rural areas.

There were 552 households in Decatur, including 385 families. Of all households, 33.7% had children under the age of 18 living in them, 37.3% were married-couple households, 20.5% were households with a male householder and no spouse or partner present, and 38.2% were households with a female householder and no spouse or partner present. About 31.2% of all households were made up of individuals and 13.6% had someone living alone who was 65 years of age or older.

There were 609 housing units, of which 9.4% were vacant. The homeowner vacancy rate was 1.3% and the rental vacancy rate was 6.0%.

Racial composition as of the 2020 census
Race	Number	Percent
White	1,086	55.8%
Black or African American	747	38.4%
American Indian and Alaska Native	27	1.4%
Asian	11	0.6%
Native Hawaiian and Other Pacific Islander	0	0.0%
Some other race	18	0.9%
Two or more races	56	2.9%
Hispanic or Latino (of any race)	40	2.1%

=== 2000 census ===
As of the census of 2000, there were 1,426 people, 407 households, and 269 families residing in the town. The population density was 1,379.9 inhabitants per square mile (532.8/km^{2}). There were 463 housing units at an average density of 448.0 per square mile (173.0/km^{2}). The racial makeup of the town was 66.41% White, 32.54% African American, 0.56% Native American, 0.14% Asian, and 0.35% from two or more races. Hispanic or Latino of any race were 1.05% of the population.

There were 407 households, out of which 31.0% had children under the age of 18 living with them, 44.5% were married couples living together, 18.2% had a female householder with no husband present, and 33.9% were non-families. 30.7% of all households were made up of individuals, and 9.6% had someone living alone who was 65 years of age or older. The average household size was 2.30 and the average family size was 2.85.

In the town, the population was spread out, with 16.5% under the age of 18, 41.8% from 18 to 24, 16.4% from 25 to 44, 14.9% from 45 to 64, and 10.3% who were 65 years of age or older. The median age was 21 years. For every 100 females, there were 100.6 males. For every 100 females age 18 and over, there were 97.3 males.

The median income for a household in the town was $28,333, and the median income for a family was $37,115. Males had a median income of $28,875 versus $20,000 for females. The per capita income for the town was $10,839. About 14.8% of families and 19.4% of the population were below the poverty line, including 28.7% of those under age 18 and 10.3% of those age 65 or over.

== Education ==
Decatur is in the Newton County School District.

East Central Community College has its main campus in Decatur.

== Notable people ==
- Kemp Alderman, Major League Baseball player
- Lamar Blount, former end in the National Football League
- Charles Evers, first post-Reconstruction African American mayor in Mississippi
- Medgar Evers, civil rights activist
- Betsy Harris, basketball coach
- W. H. Johnson Jr., state legislator
- Randy Rushing, member of the Mississippi House of Representatives|url=https://billstatus.ls.state.ms.us

== See also ==
- American Legion Hut (Decatur, Mississippi)
