= John Regan American Legion Hall =

- Regan, John, American Legion Hall
- U.S. National Register of Historic Places
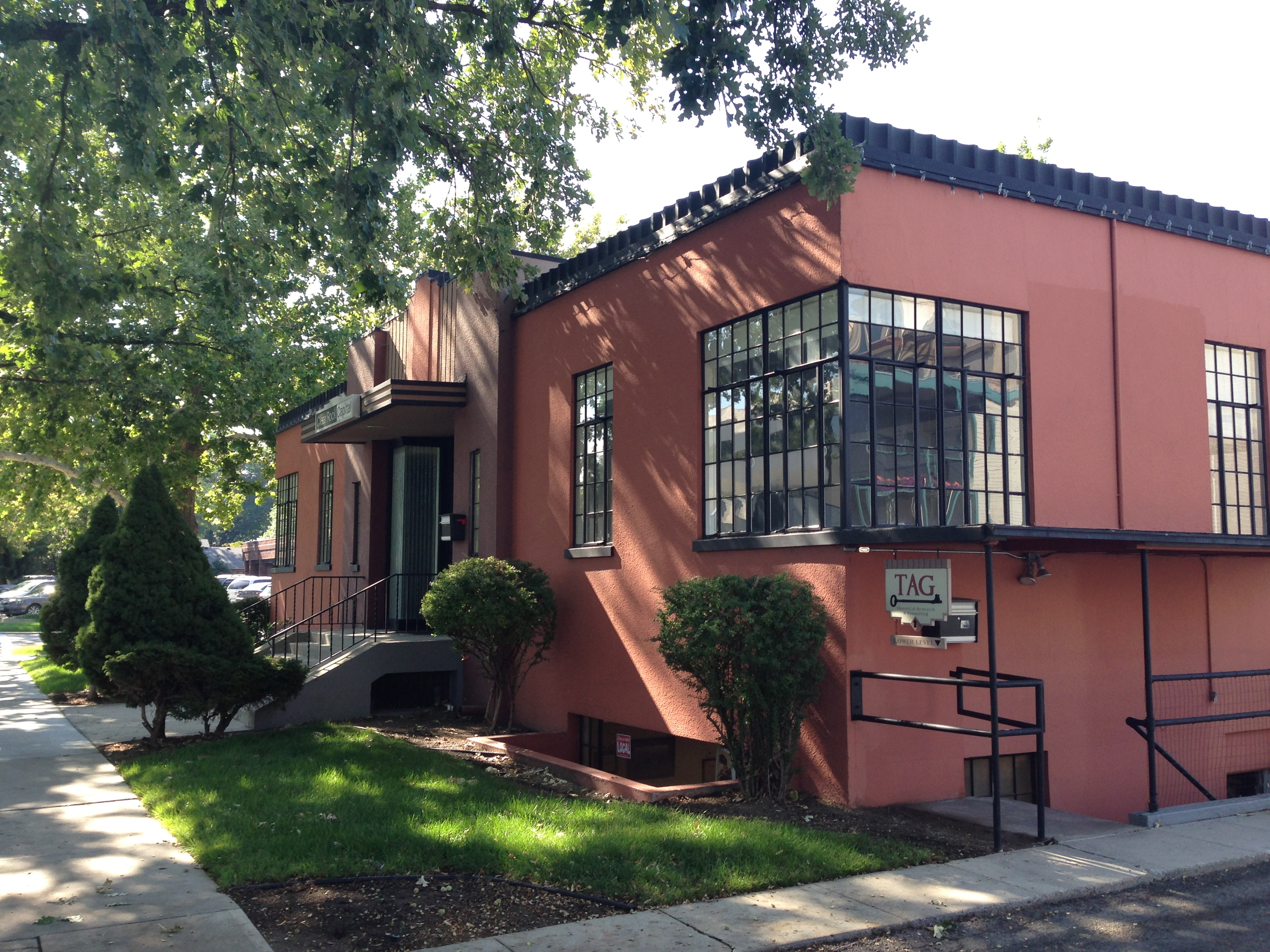

- Location within Idaho Location within the United States
- Location: 401 W. Idaho St., Boise, Idaho
- Coordinates: 43°36′18″N 116°11′51″W
- Area: less than one acre
- Built: 1939
- Architect: Tourtellotte & Hummel; Kloepfer & Cahoon
- Architectural style: Moderne, Modern Movement, Art Deco
- MPS: Tourtellotte and Hummel Architecture TR
- NRHP reference No.: 82000234
- Added to NRHP: November 17, 1982

The John Regan American Legion Hall at 401 W. Idaho St. in Boise, Idaho was built in 1939. It was designed by Tourtellotte & Hummel. Its architecture is a hybrid of Moderne and Art Deco architecture.

It served historically as an American Legion clubhouse. It was listed on the National Register of Historic Places in 1982 for its architecture.

The current tenants are TAG Historical Research (lower level) and ClearRock Capital.

== See also ==
- List of American Legion buildings
- National Register of Historic Places listings in Ada County, Idaho
