= Fillmore American Legion Hall =

- U.S. National Register of Historic Places
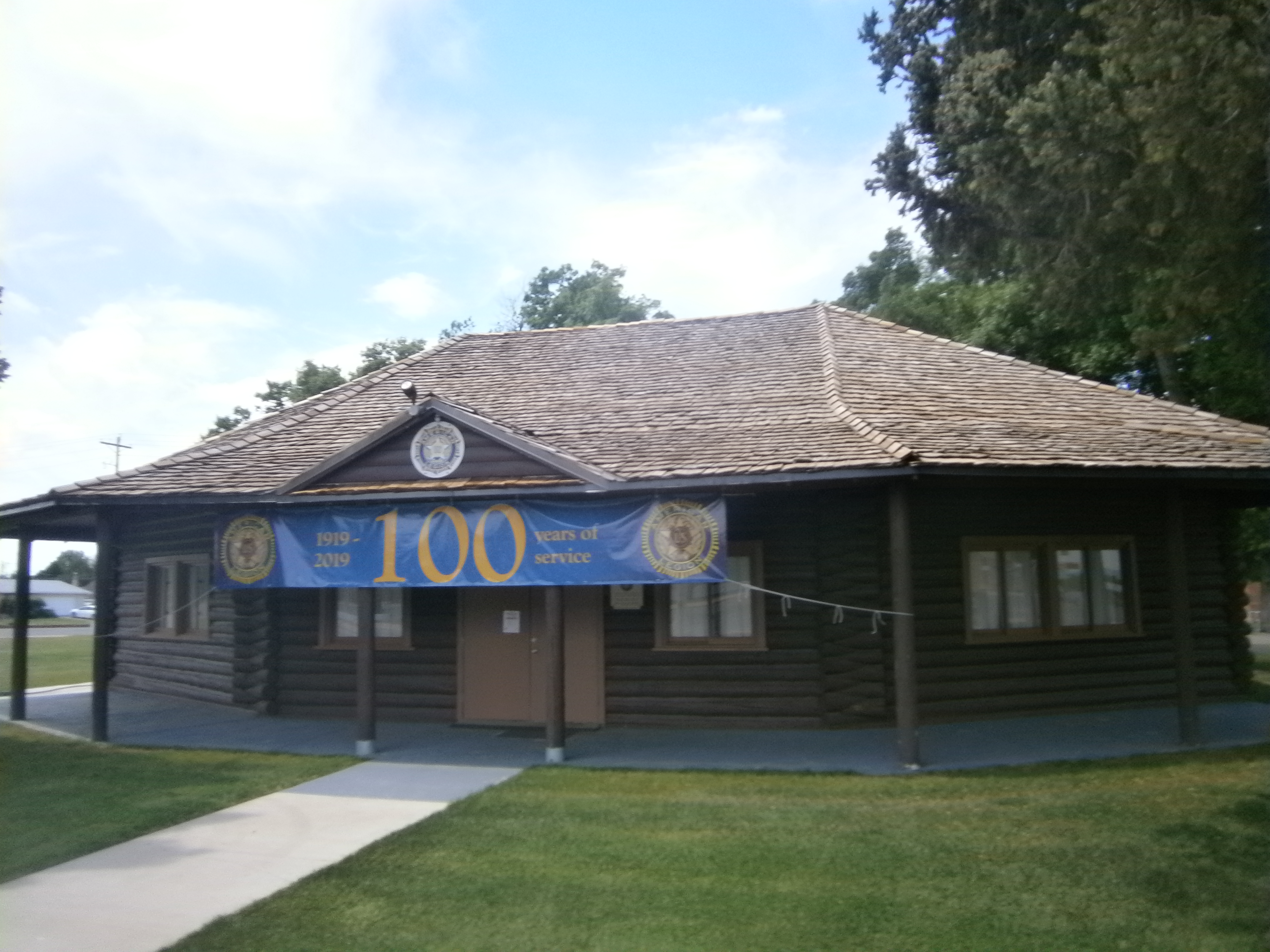

- Location within Utah Location within the United States
- Location: 80 S Main St, Fillmore, Utah
- Coordinates: 38°58′02″N 112°19′26″W
- Area: 0.3 acres (0.12 ha)
- Built: 1924
- Built by: Paulson, P.S.; Hanson, Martin
- NRHP reference No.: 10001174
- Added to NRHP: January 24, 2011

The Fillmore American Legion Hall, at 80 S. Main St. in Fillmore, Utah, was built in 1924. It was listed on the National Register of Historic Places in 2011.

It is home of American Legion Post 61. Millard County had 150 American Legion members in 2019.
