= American Legion Cabin (Potlatch, Idaho) =

- U.S. National Register of Historic Places
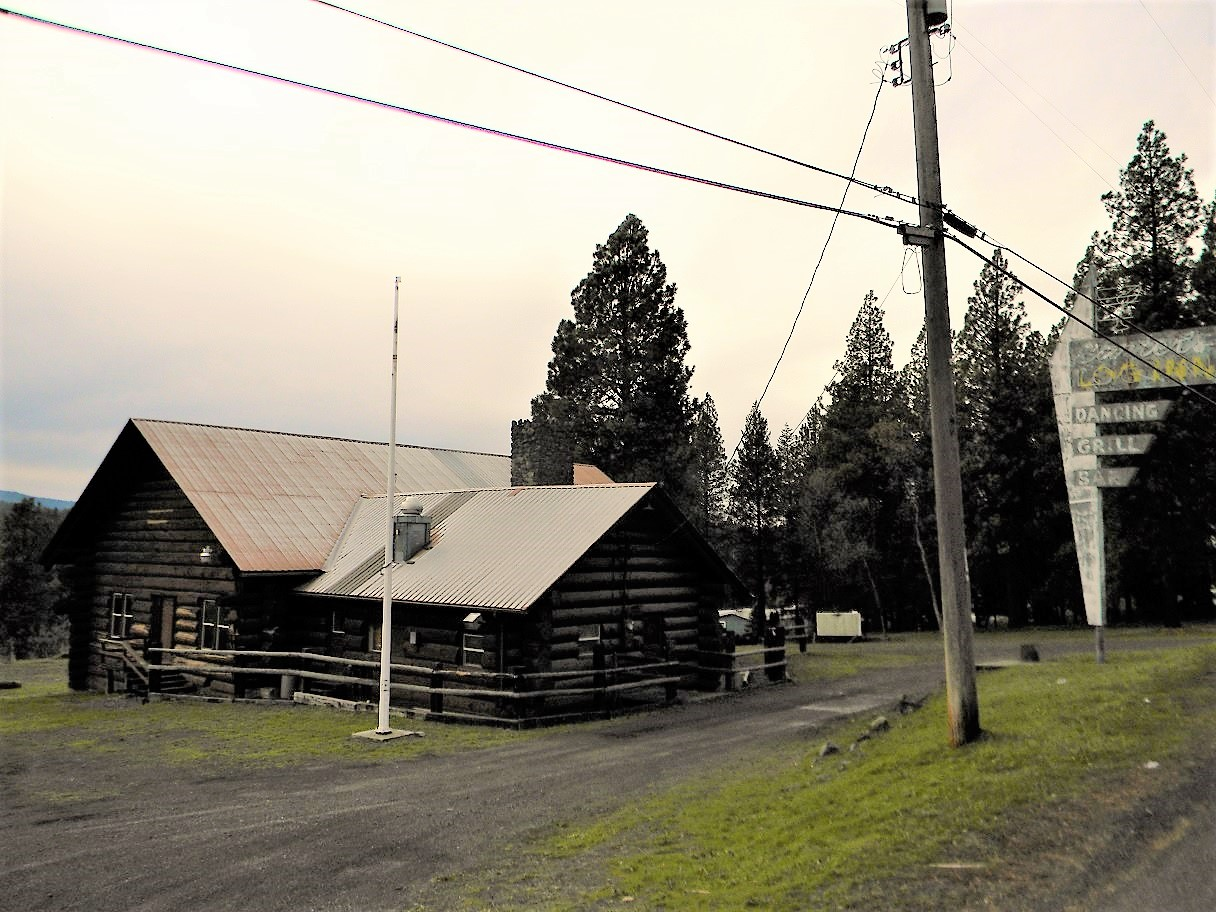

- Location within Idaho Location within the United States
- Location: US Alt. 95, Potlatch, Idaho
- Coordinates: 46°55′16″N 116°53′25″W
- Area: less than one acre
- Built: 1928-29
- Architectural style: Bungalow/Craftsman
- MPS: Potlatch MRA
- NRHP reference No.: 86002197
- Added to NRHP: September 11, 1986

The American Legion Cabin on State Highway 6 in Potlatch, Idaho was constructed in 1928–29. It was listed on the National Register of Historic Places in 1986 because of its historically significant architecture. It was designed as a bungalow with American Craftsman influenceBungalow/Craftsman architecture and served as a clubhouse.

It is a one-and-a-half-story L-shaped log bungalow building. It is significant as one of few privately built buildings in the company town of Potlatch, for its association with the American Legion, and as one of few social settings where company workers and managers interacted. It is a memorial to World War I servicemen from Potlatch. As of 1985 it was owned by the American Legion chapter but was leased out as a restaurant.

== See also ==
- List of American Legion buildings
- National Register of Historic Places listings in Latah County, Idaho
