= American Legion Hut (Tahlequah, Oklahoma) =

- U.S. National Register of Historic Places
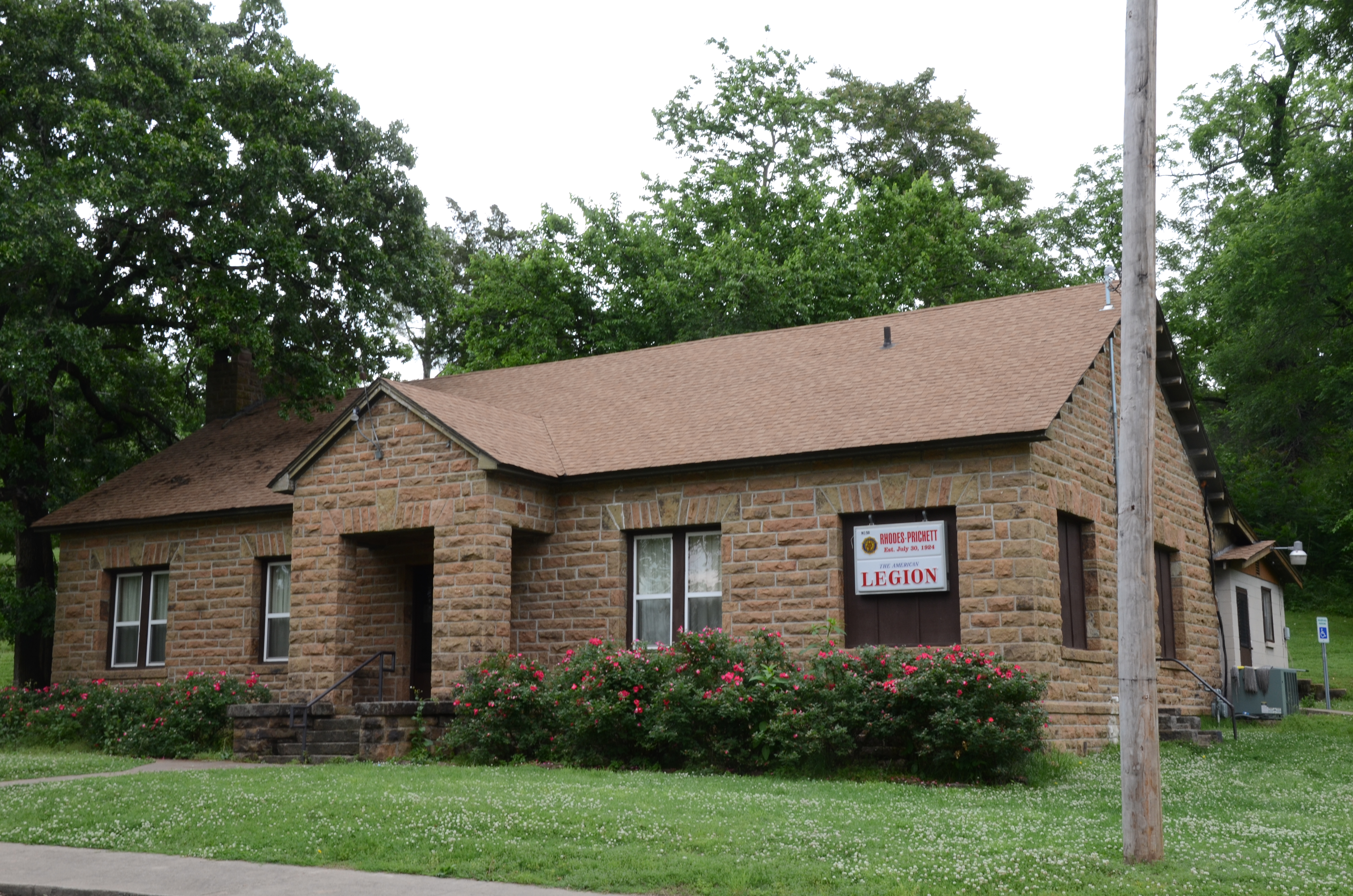

- Location within Oklahoma Location within the United States
- Location: Tehlequah City Park, jct. of E Shawnee St. and N. Brookside Ave., Tahlequah, Oklahoma
- Coordinates: 35°54′47″N 94°58′3″W
- Area: less than one acre
- Built: 1937
- Architect: WPA
- Architectural style: WPA Standardized Style
- NRHP reference No.: 06000798
- Added to NRHP: August 24, 2006

The American Legion Hut in Tahlequah City Park, jct. of E Shawnee St. and N. Brookside Ave., in Tahlequah, Oklahoma was built in 1937 and was listed on the National Register in 2006. It reflects WPA Standardized Style and is also known as Rhodes Pritchett American Legion Hut Post 50 and served as a meeting hall.
