= American Legion Hall (Searcy, Arkansas) =

- U.S. National Register of Historic Places
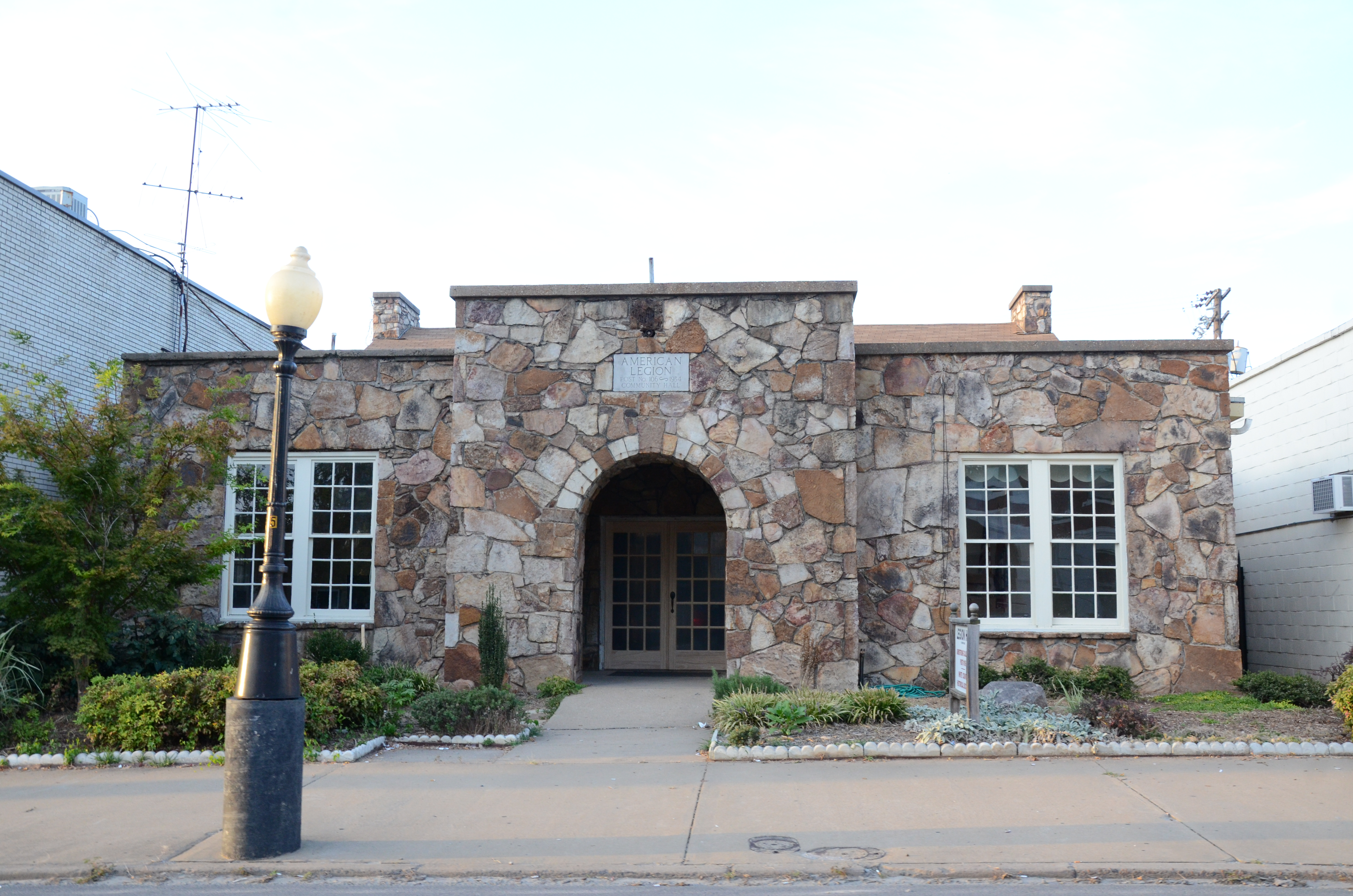

- Location within Arkansas Location within the United States
- Location: Jct. of Race and Spruce Sts., Searcy, Arkansas
- Coordinates: 35°15′4″N 91°44′17″W
- Area: less than one acre
- Built: 1939
- Built by: Works Progress Administration
- Architectural style: WPA architecture
- MPS: White County MPS
- NRHP reference No.: 91001186
- Added to NRHP: September 13, 1991

The American Legion Hall is a historic social meeting hall at Race and Spruce Streets in the center of Searcy, Arkansas. It is a single-story structure, built out of native fieldstone in 1939 with funding support from the Works Progress Administration (WPA). Its main block has a side-facing gable roof, with a projecting flat-roof section in which the entrance is recessed under a rounded archway. The building is typical of rustic-styled buildings constructed by the WPA and other jobs programs of the Great Depression.

The building was listed on the National Register of Historic Places in 1991.

== See also ==
- National Register of Historic Places listings in White County, Arkansas
