= Bunch-Walton Post No. 22 American Legion Hut =

- Bunch-Walton Post #22 American Legion Hut
- U.S. National Register of Historic Places
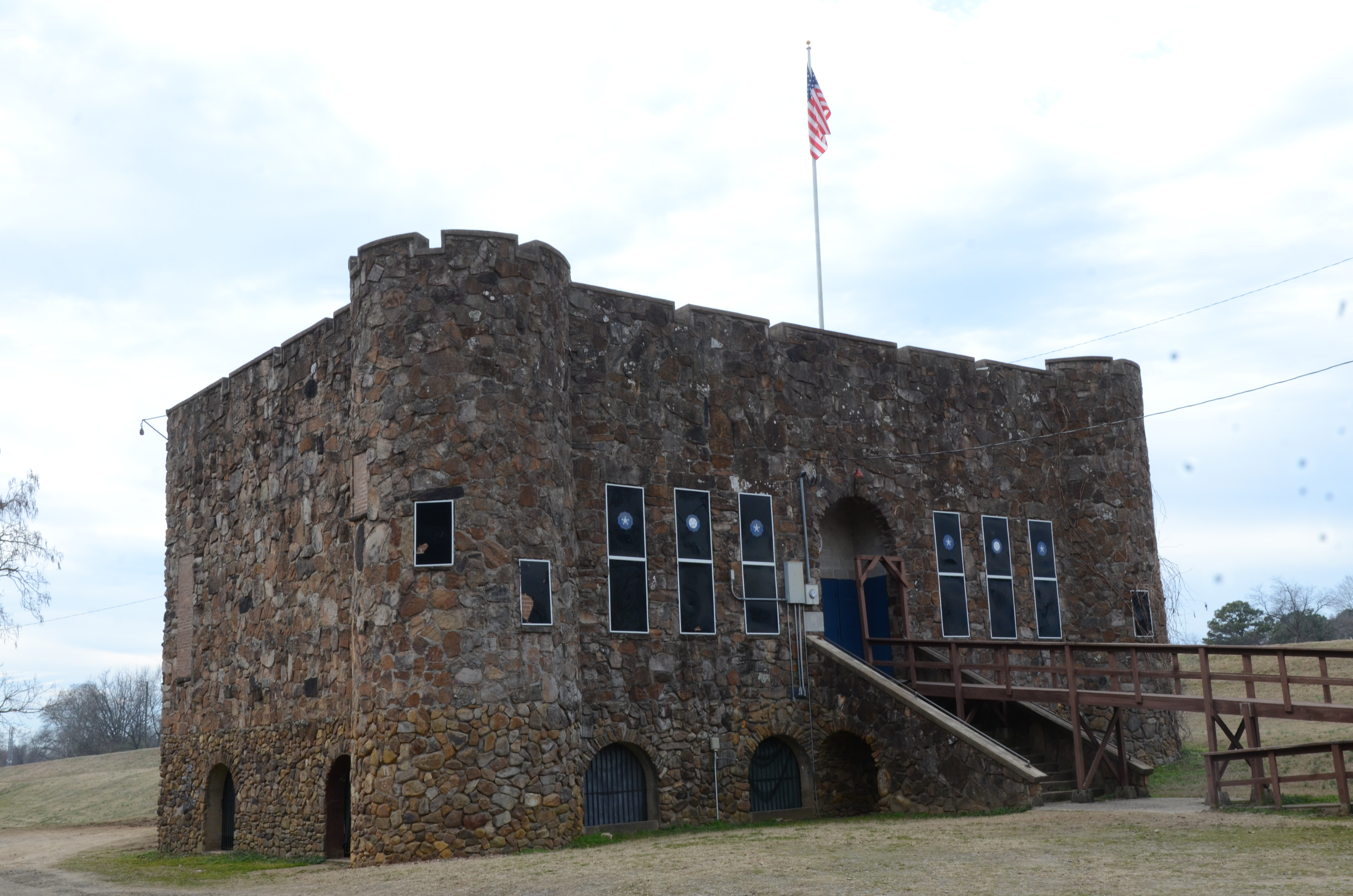

- Location within Arkansas Location within the United States
- Location: 201 Legion St., Clarksville, Arkansas
- Coordinates: 35°28′17″N 93°27′29″W
- Area: less than one acre
- Built: 1934
- Architect: Civil Works Administration
- Architectural style: Normanesque
- MPS: New Deal Recovery Efforts in Arkansas MPS
- NRHP reference No.: 06001269
- Added to NRHP: January 24, 2007

The Bunch-Walton Post No. 22 American Legion Hut is a historic social club meeting hall at 201 Legion Street in Clarksville, Arkansas. It is architecturally unique in the community, built out of native stone in the manner of a Norman castle. It is two stories in height, with rounded projecting corners and a crenellated parapet. Its main entrance is set in a rounded-arch opening at the center of the front facade, and is elevated, with access via flight of stairs. It was built in 1934, and is believed to be the only American Legion hall of this style in the state.

The building was listed on the National Register of Historic Places in 2007.

== See also ==
- National Register of Historic Places listings in Johnson County, Arkansas
