= Site of Ferdinand Branstetter Post No. 1, American Legion =

- U.S. National Register of Historic Places
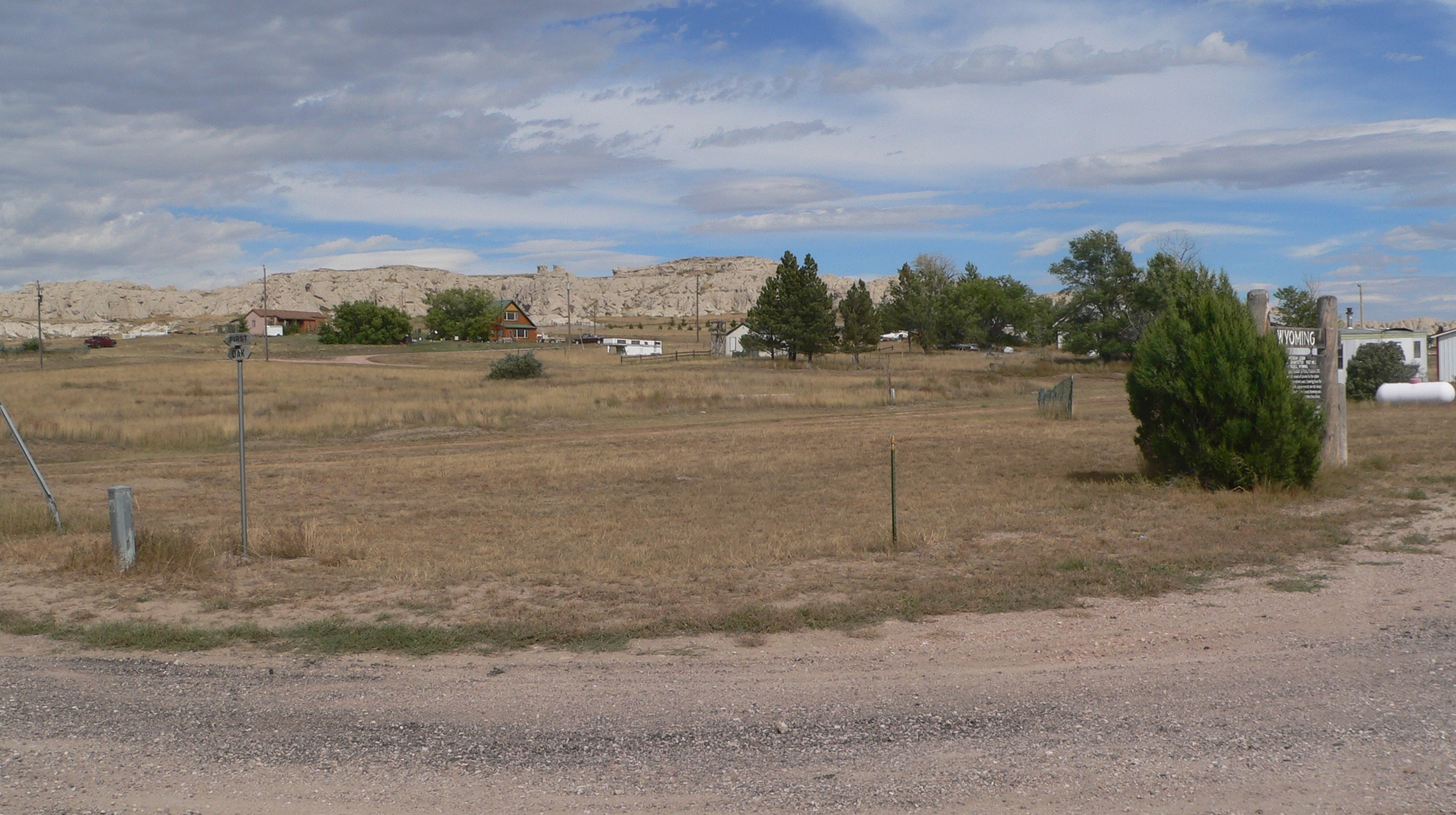
- Post site, seen from the southwest. A sign recounting the site's history is largely concealed by the juniper at right.

- Location within Wyoming Location within the United States
- Location: US 20, Van Tassell, Wyoming
- Coordinates: 42°39′47″N 104°5′25″W
- Built: 1919
- NRHP reference No.: 69000194
- Added to NRHP: September 30, 1969

The Site of Ferdinand Branstetter Post No. 1 of the American Legion is a vacant lot in Van Tassell, Wyoming where one of the first American Legion posts in the United States was established in 1919. The post was named after Ferdinand Branstetter, a Van Tassell resident who died in World War I. The structure housing the post has since been demolished. The site was listed on the National Register of Historic Places in 1969. In 1969, it was hoped that an interpretative sign would be put up, and also possibly that a restored post building would be constructed.

An interpretative sign exists at the site, in 2009.
