= American Legion Post No. 127 Building =

- U.S. National Register of Historic Places
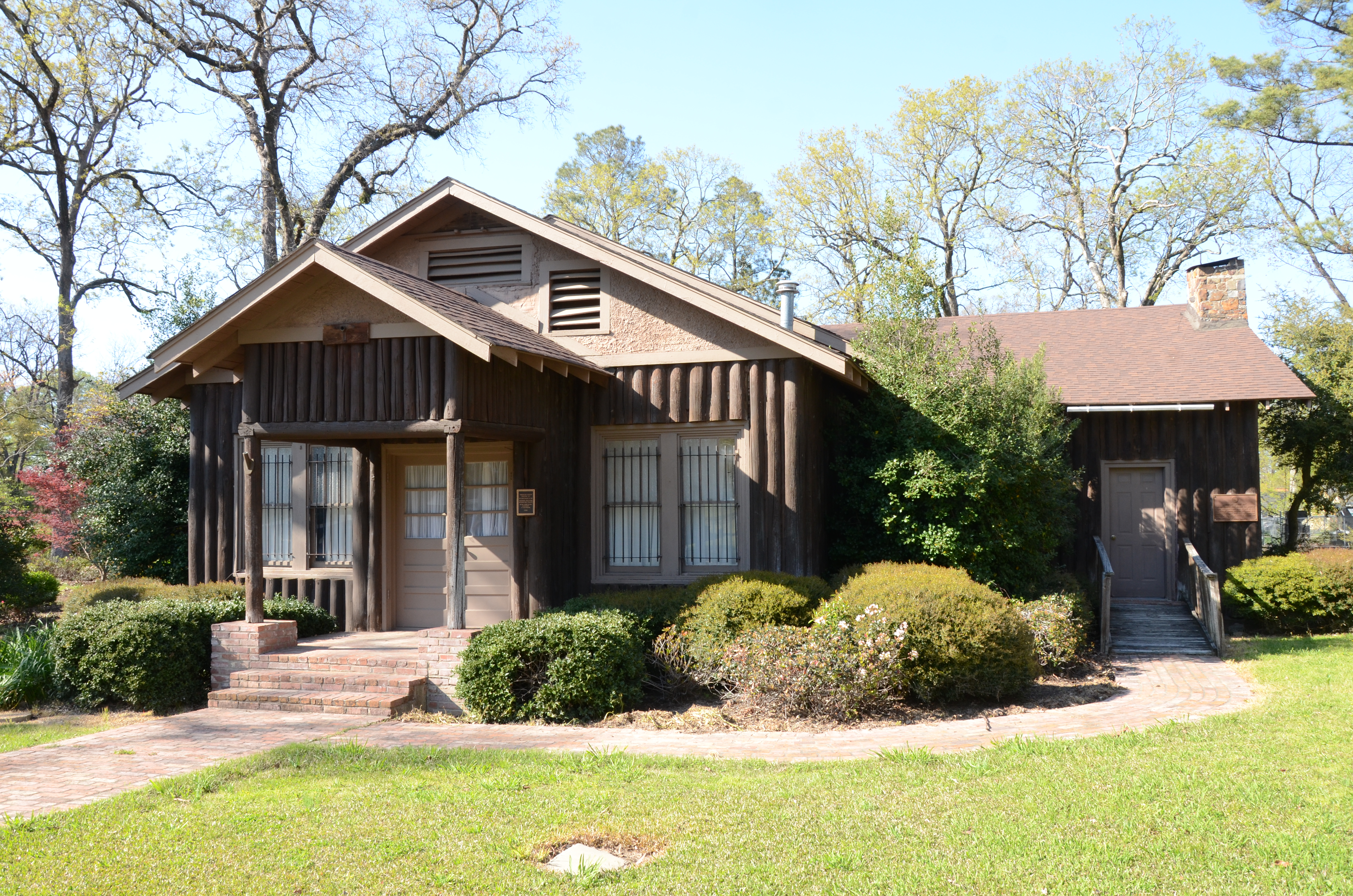

- Location within Arkansas Location within the United States
- Location: Jct. of Cherry and Armstrong Sts., NE corner, Eudora, Arkansas
- Coordinates: 33°6′37″N 91°15′50″W
- Area: less than one acre
- Built: 1934
- Architect: Works Progress Administration
- Architectural style: Rustic
- NRHP reference No.: 92001350
- Added to NRHP: October 8, 1992

The American Legion Post No. 127 Building is a historic meeting hall at the corner of Cherry and Armstrong Streets in Eudora, Arkansas. The single story vertical log building was built in 1934 by the Works Progress Administration in Rustic architecture style. The building has retained much of its interior and exterior finish.

The building was listed on the National Register of Historic Places in 1992.

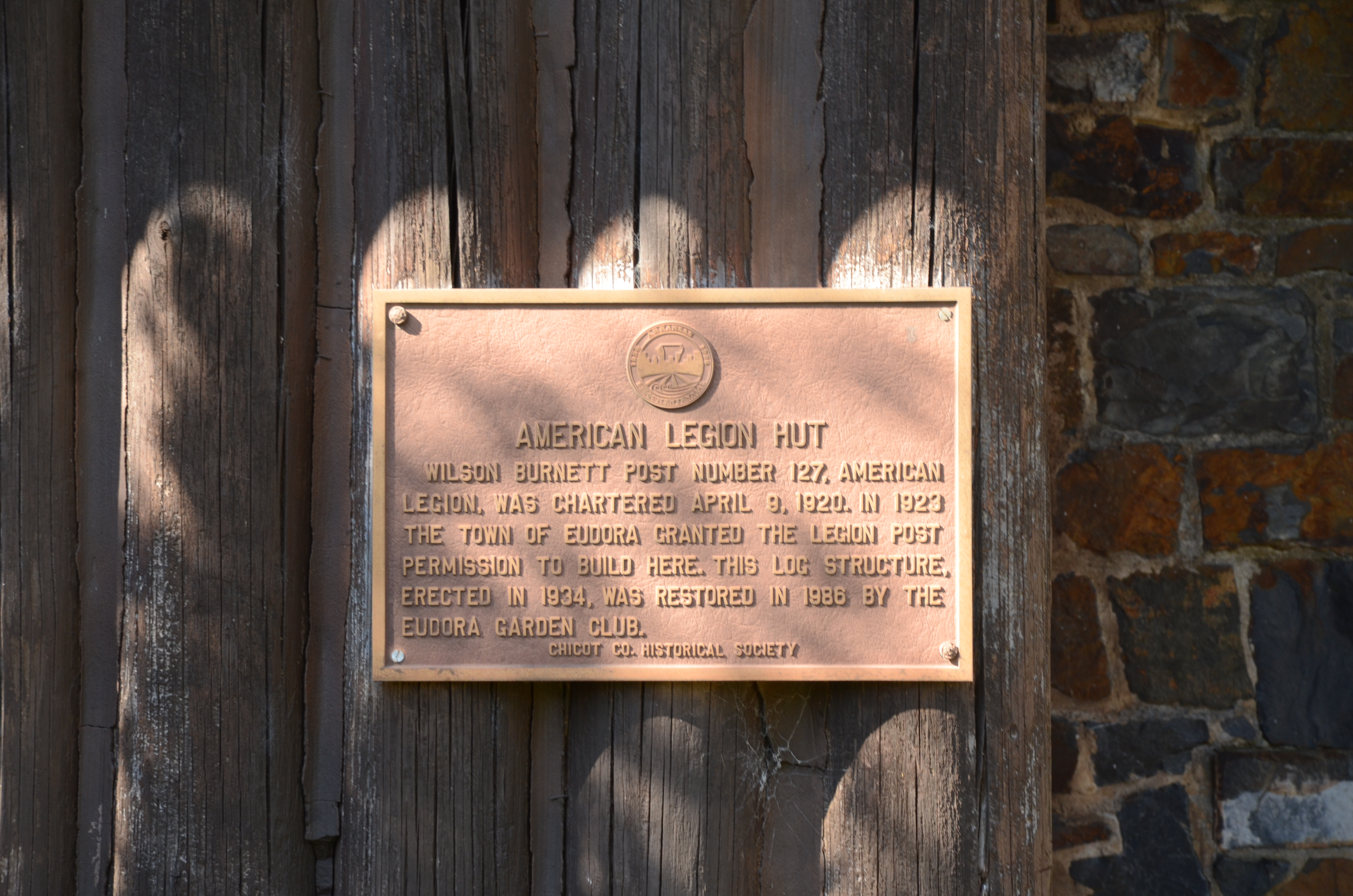
Historical Plaque

== See also ==
- National Register of Historic Places listings in Chicot County, Arkansas
