= Beely-Johnson American Legion Post 139 =

- U.S. National Register of Historic Places
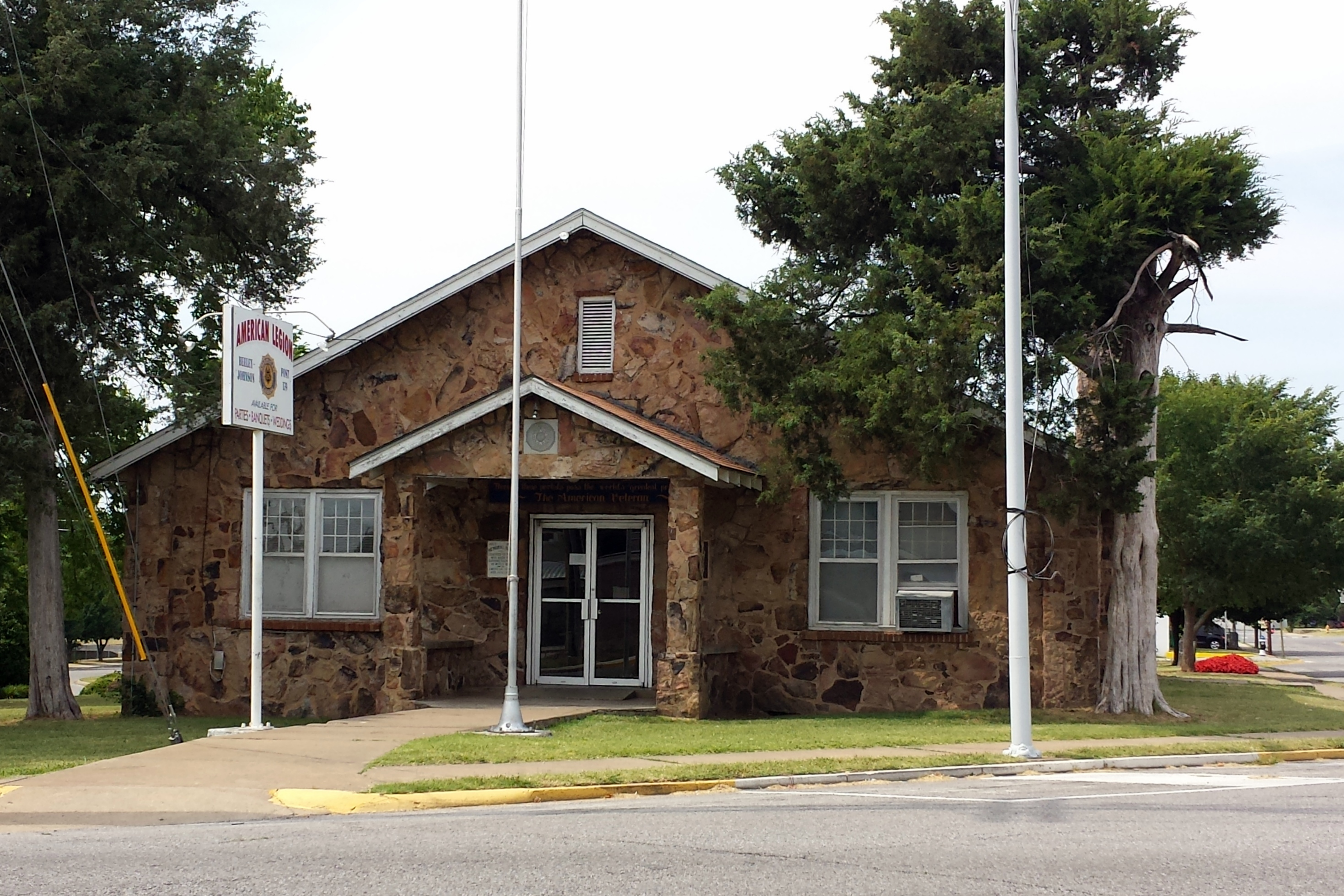

- Location within Arkansas Location within the United States
- Location: 200 N. Spring St., Springdale, Arkansas
- Coordinates: 36°11′11″N 94°7′47″W
- Area: less than one acre
- Built: 1934
- MPS: New Deal Recovery Efforts in Arkansas MPS
- NRHP reference No.: 07000474
- Added to NRHP: May 30, 2007

The Beely-Johnson American Legion Post 139 is a historic meeting hall at 200 North Spring Street in Springdale, Arkansas. It is a single-story vernacular structure, built out of rough-cut stone laid in irregular courses, and topped by a gable roof. The building is one of the few remaining stone buildings on Springdale. It was built in 1934 with locally raised funding after a grant proposal to the Civil Works Administration, a federal government jobs program, was rejected. The building has served as a meeting point for a large number of local civic organizations, and has been used as a polling place.

The building was listed on the National Register of Historic Places in 2007 for its architecture and role in the area's social history.
