= Estes-Williams American Legion Hut No. 61 =

- Estes-Williams American Legion Hut #61
- U.S. National Register of Historic Places
- Location within Arkansas Location within the United States
- Location: AR 62/412, Yellville, Arkansas
- Coordinates: 36°13′34″N 92°40′49″W
- Area: less than one acre
- Built: 1933
- Architect: Cavaness, George; Estes, Ruey
- Architectural style: Rustic
- NRHP reference No.: 01000111
- Added to NRHP: February 16, 2001

The Estes-Williams American Legion Hut #61 is a historic clubhouse on AR 62/412 in Yellville, Arkansas. It is a single-story Rustic-style log building built in 1933-34 by the local chapter of the American Legion, with funding assistance from the Civil Works Administration. The building is roughly T-shaped, with small projecting sections at the front and rear. It has a cross-gable roof with extended eaves and exposed rafter tails supported by large knee braces in the Craftsman style. The building is also used by other veterans' and community groups for meetings and events.

The building was listed on the National Register of Historic Places in 2001.

== See also ==
- National Register of Historic Places listings in Marion County, Arkansas
