= American Legion Post No. 121 Building =

- American Legion Post No. 121
- U.S. National Register of Historic Places
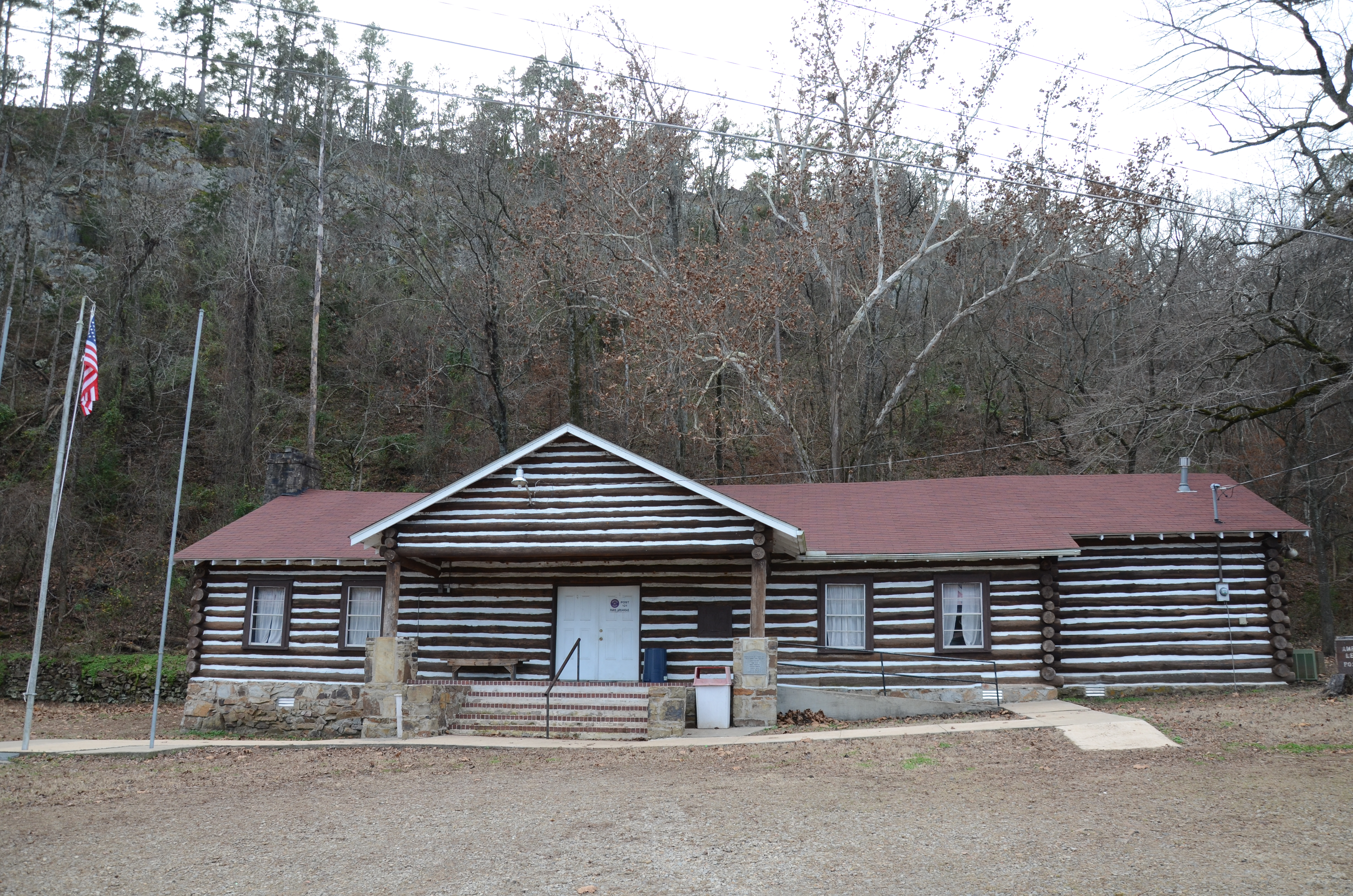

- Location within Arkansas Location within the United States
- Location: Legion Hut Rd., Paris, Arkansas
- Coordinates: 35°16′33″N 93°44′3″W
- Area: less than one acre
- Built: 1934
- Architect: WPA
- Architectural style: WPA Rustic
- NRHP reference No.: 95000758
- Added to NRHP: June 20, 1995

The American Legion Post No. 121 is a historic social hall on Legion Hut Road in southern Paris, Arkansas. It is a single-story L-shaped structure, built out of notched logs on a stone foundation. The logs are painted brown, and are mortared with white cement. It has a gabled roof with exposed rafter ends. A gabled porch shelters the front entrance, supported by square posts set on concrete piers faced in stone. The building was constructed in 1934 with work crews funded by the Works Progress Administration, and is the best local example of WPA Rustic architecture.

The building was listed on the National Register of Historic Places in 1995.

== See also ==
- National Register of Historic Places listings in Logan County, Arkansas
