= Cushing American Legion Building =

- U.S. National Register of Historic Places
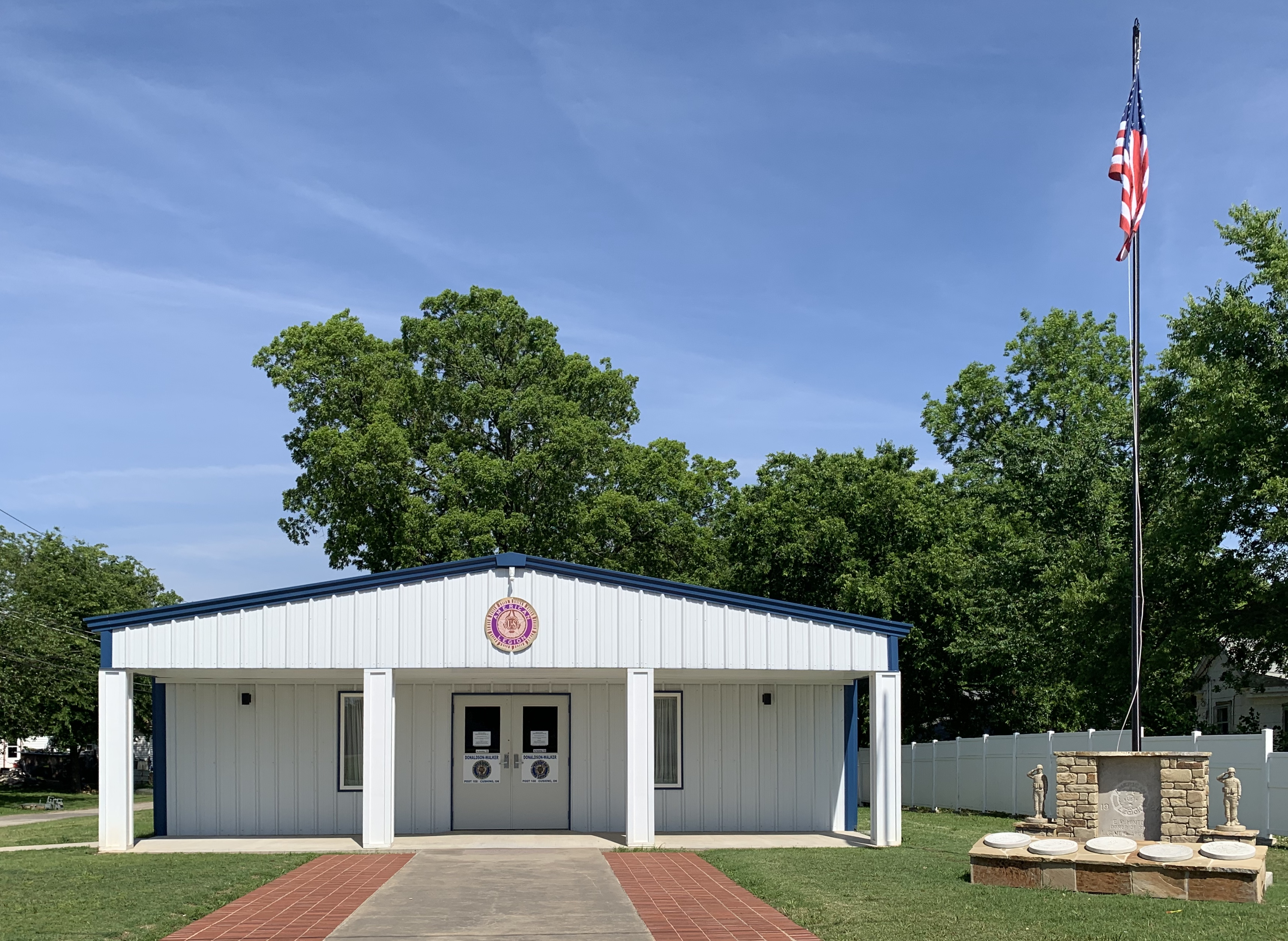

- Location within Oklahoma Location within the United States
- Location: 212 S. Noble, Cushing, Oklahoma
- Coordinates: 35°58′41″N 96°46′10″W
- Area: 0.1 acres (0.040 ha)
- Built: 1924
- Architect: New, L.C.
- Architectural style: Mission Revival
- NRHP reference No.: 03000514
- Added to NRHP: June 05, 2003

The Cushing American Legion Building is an American Legion hall located at 212 S. Noble in Cushing, Oklahoma. The building was built in 1924 to serve as a meeting place for American Legion Post 108, which was organized by World War I veterans. The Mission Revival building features a raised parapet and a colonnade of square columns in front of the entrance. The American Legion Post hosted social events for veterans and sponsored observances on Armistice Day and Memorial Day. The post expanded to include World War II veterans in the 1940s and hosted meetings of other local groups throughout the 1940s and 1950s; the American Legion has continued to meet at the post into the 21st century.

The building was listed on the National Register of Historic Places in 2003. It was demolished in 2017, after suffering serious structural damage during a 5.0 magnitude earthquake that struck Nov. 6, 2017.
