= American Legion Memorial Building =

- U.S. National Register of Historic Places
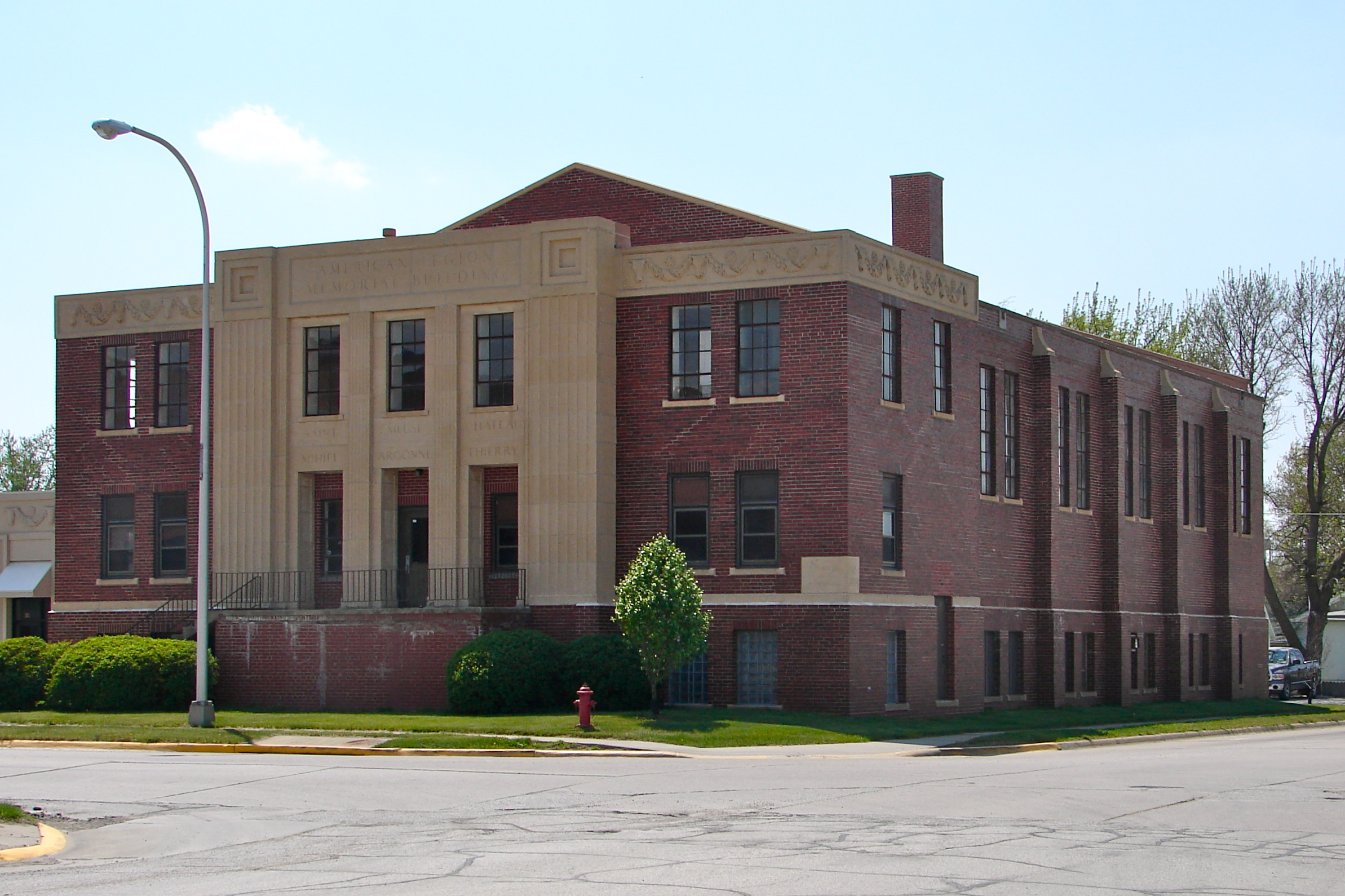

- Location within Iowa Location within the United States
- Location: 201 Poplar St. Atlantic, Iowa
- Coordinates: 41°24′32″N 95°0′50″W
- Area: less than one acre
- Built: 1939
- Built by: G.F. Construction Company
- Architect: George A. Spooner
- Architectural style: Moderne; Art Deco
- NRHP reference No.: 06001121
- Added to NRHP: December 12, 2006

The American Legion Memorial Building, also known as Atlantic National Guard Armory, at 201 Poplar Street in Atlantic, Iowa was built in 1929-30. It was listed on the National Register of Historic Places in 2006. Designed by Council Bluffs architect George A. Spooner, it includes Moderne and Art Deco architecture. It was built by G.F. Construction Company of Exira, Iowa. The building served historically for arms storage, as a military facility, as a meeting hall, and as a sport facility.
