= American Legion Hut (Decatur, Mississippi) =

- Newton County American Legion Post No. 89 Hut
- U.S. National Register of Historic Places
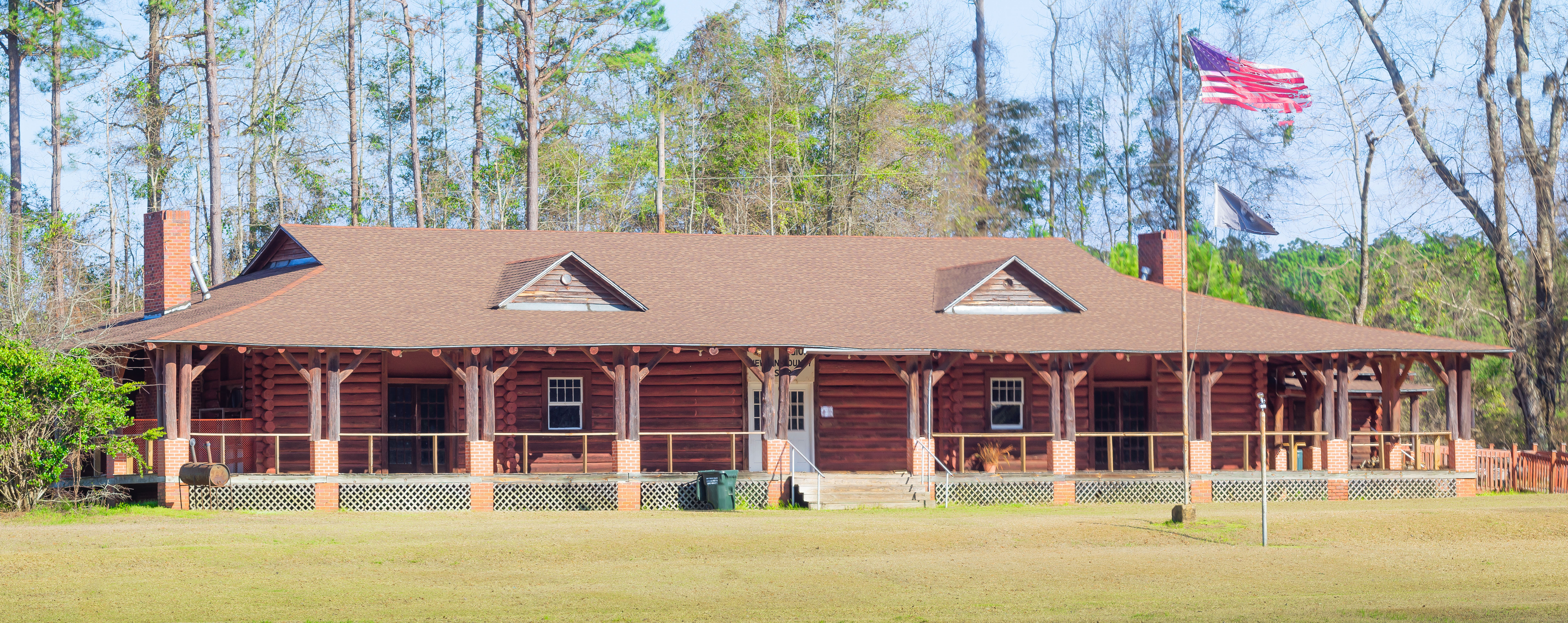
- Newton County American Legion Post No. 89 Hut in Decatur, Mississippi

- Location within Mississippi Location within the United States
- Location: 14051 MS-15 Decatur, Mississippi
- Coordinates: 32.4200°N 89.1102°W
- Area: 24 acres (9.7 ha)
- Built: 1934
- Architectural style: Rustic architecture
- NRHP reference No.: 07000148
- Added to NRHP: March 13, 2007

The American Legion Hut (Decatur, Mississippi), also known as the Newton County American Legion Post No. 89 Hut, was built in 1934. With 24 acres (9.7 ha), it was listed on the U.S. National Register of Historic Places in 2007. It is significant for its Rustic style architecture as applied in Mississippi, which includes use of horizontal log walls, exposed rafters and trusses, and stone fireplaces.

== History ==
The American Legion Post No. 89 was founded in 1920 with eighteen original members, most or all being veterans of World War I. The hut was constructed in 1934, following a fire that destroyed the original building in 1933. The current structure was intended to serve as a memorial for local veterans and as a recreational center for the community. Since its construction, the hut has hosted numerous local social and civic functions, playing a vital role in the community.

== Architecture ==
The hut is a one-story rectangular building constructed with horizontal logs, set on brick piers. It features a dual-pitched hip roof with broad eaves that cover a three-quarter wrap-around gallery. The gallery is supported by double log pillars with Y-braces resting on brick piers. The west facade has 8/1 double-hung sash windows, a half-glazed center door, and flanking multiple-panel French doors. Other elevations feature 6/6 double-hung sash windows.

Inside, the building has exposed log walls, with an open ceiling that reveals roof rafters and Howe trusses. The floors are made of wood planks, and large ironstone fireplaces with fieldstone surrounds and brick fireboxes are located on the north and south walls. The interior layout includes a large stage, a kitchen, and separate restrooms for men and women. Living quarters for onsite caretakers were added during the 1934 reconstruction.

== Significance in Rustic Architecture ==
The Newton County American Legion Post No. 89 Hut is a prime example of Rustic style architecture in Mississippi. The building's use of log construction, exposed rafters, and natural materials is characteristic of the Rustic style, which emphasizes harmony with the natural environment. This style was popularized in park lodges and recreational facilities in the United States during the early 20th century. The hut maintains an organic relationship with its hilltop setting and remains largely unchanged since its construction in 1934.

== Preservation ==
Despite some alterations, such as the addition of vertical cladding and replacement of the lower portions of the log columns with brick pedestals, the hut retains its original character and architectural integrity. These changes do not detract from the building's historic value, and it remains a well-preserved example of Rustic architecture in the state.
