= Hall Morgan Post 83, American Legion Hut =

- Formerly listed on the U.S. National Register of Historic Places
- Location within Arkansas Location within the United States
- Location: 208 Sycamore St., Rison, Arkansas
- Coordinates: 33°57′30″N 92°11′18″W
- Built: 1934
- Architect: CWA-WPA
- Architectural style: Rustic
- NRHP reference No.: 03000399

Significant dates
- Added to NRHP: May 19, 2003
- Removed from NRHP: September 18, 2013

Hall Morgan Post 83, American Legion Hut, in Rison, Arkansas, also known as Rison American Legion Hut, was built in 1934. It was listed on the National Register of Historic Places in 2003 and delisted in 2013.
