= American Legion Hut-Des Arc =

- U.S. National Register of Historic Places
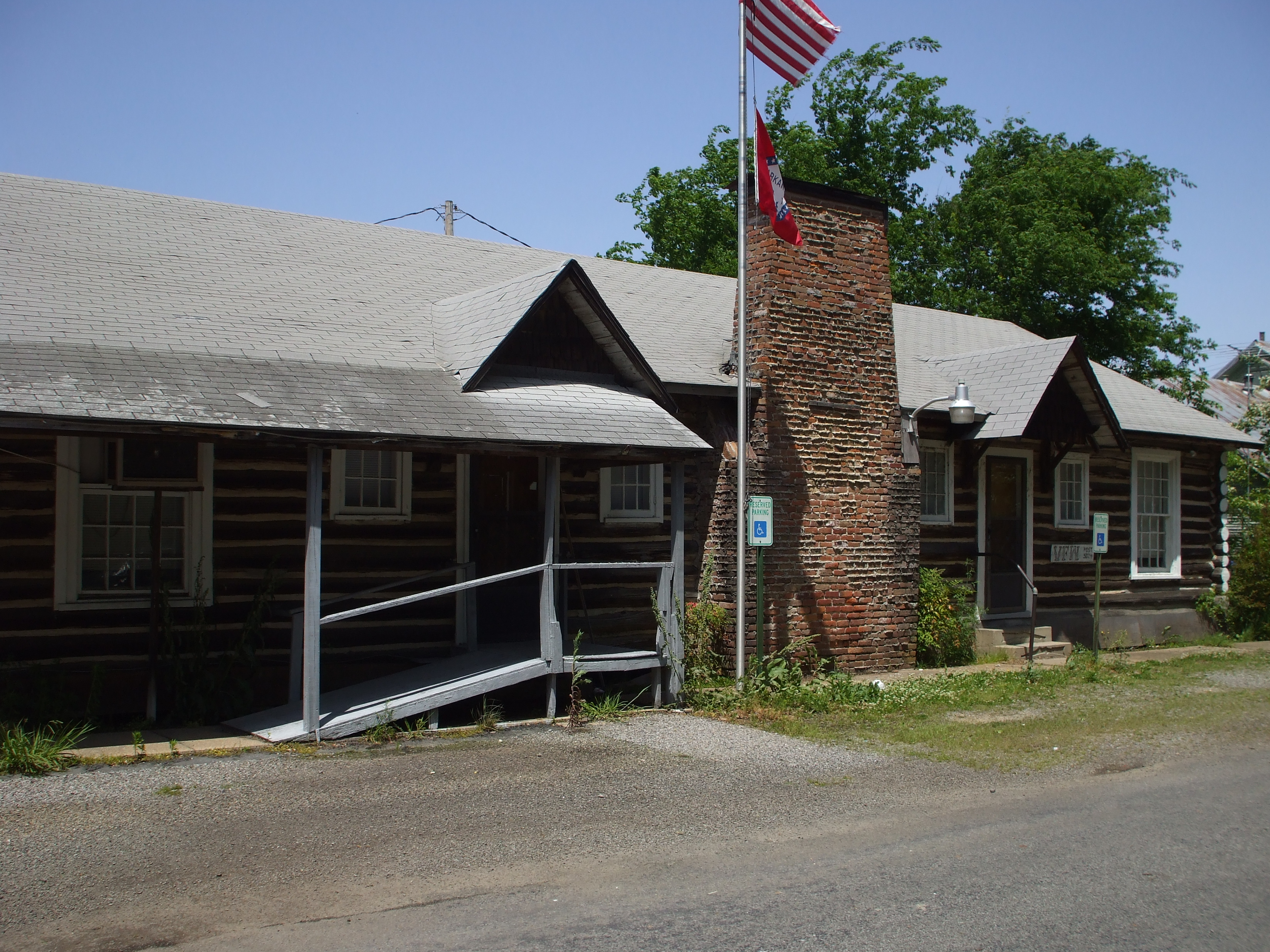

- Location within Arkansas Location within the United States
- Location: 206 Erwin St., Des Arc, Arkansas
- Coordinates: 34°58′34″N 91°29′41″W
- Area: less than one acre
- Built: 1934
- Architect: WPA; Johnson, Charlie
- Architectural style: WPA Rustic
- NRHP reference No.: 95000692
- Added to NRHP: June 09, 1995

The American Legion Hut-Des Arc is a historic fraternal meeting hall at 206 Erwin Street in Des Arc, Arkansas. It is a single story rectangular structure, built of saddle-notched round logs, with a side-gable roof and a foundation of brick piers. The logs are chinked with large amounts of white cement mortar. The main facade is adorned with a massive fieldstone chimney, and has two entrances, each sheltered by gable-roofed hoods. Built in 1934, it is the only local example of the WPA Rustic style.

The building was listed on the National Register of Historic Places in 1995.

== See also ==
- National Register of Historic Places listings in Prairie County, Arkansas
