= Jackson Hole American Legion Post No. 43 =

- U.S. National Register of Historic Places
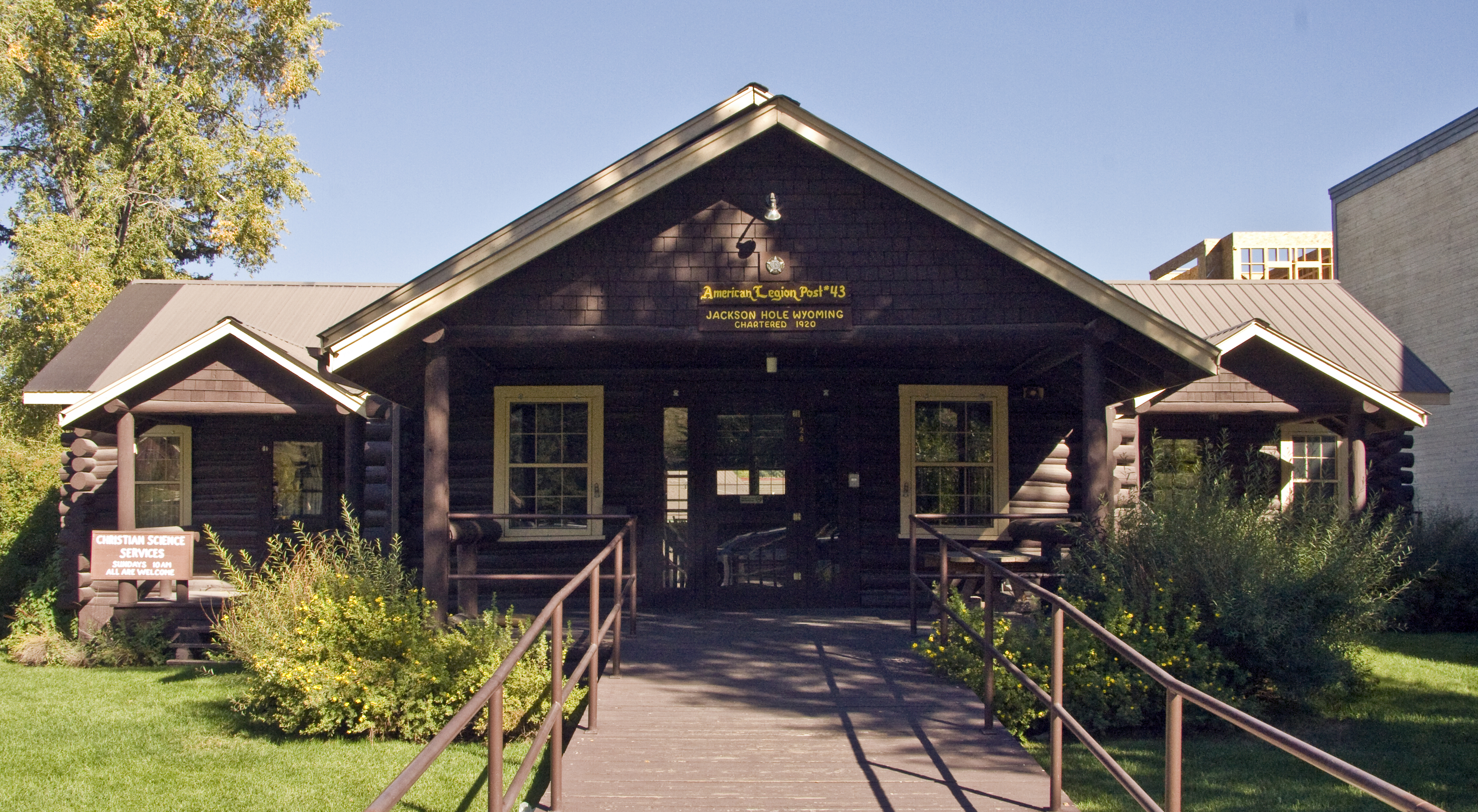

- Location within Wyoming Location within the United States
- Location: Jackson, Wyoming
- Coordinates: 43°28′55″N 110°45′40″W
- Built: 1929
- Architect: Charles Fox
- NRHP reference No.: 03000939
- Added to NRHP: September 12, 2003

The Jackson Hole American Legion Post No. 43 is a log building in Jackson, Wyoming, home to the local post of the American Legion. The post was built in 1928-29 and functioned as a community center. During its period of significance from 1929 to 1953 the post was instrumental in the shift of economic and political interests in Jackson Hole from a rural emphasis to urban interests.
