= Leo Ellis Post No. 22, American Legion Building =

- Leo Ellis Post #22, American Legion Building
- U.S. National Register of Historic Places
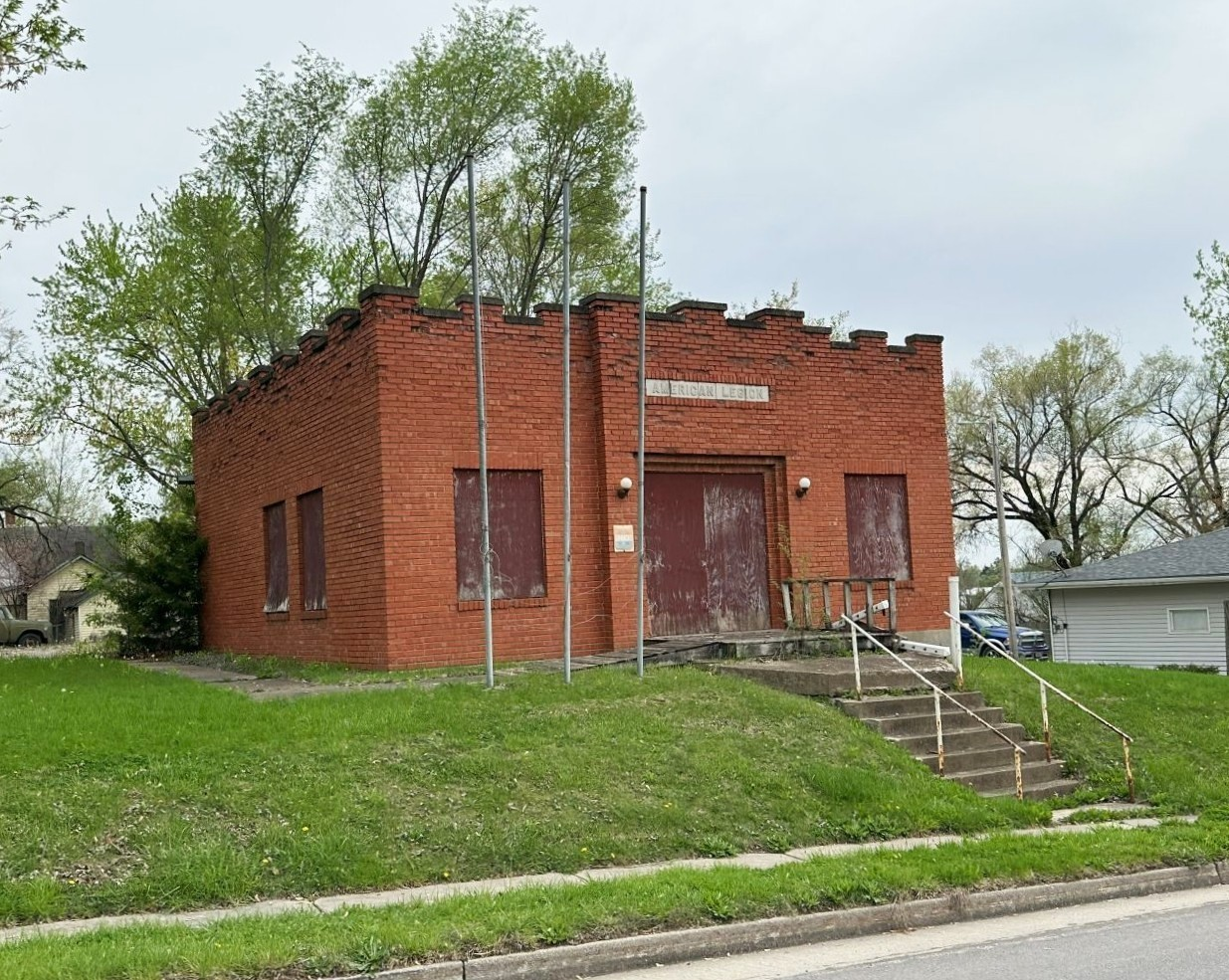
- The building in 2025

- Location within Missouri Location within the United States
- Location: 804 Grant St. Princeton, Missouri
- Coordinates: 40°24′1″N 93°35′3″W
- Area: less than one acre
- Built: 1935
- Architect: Glen Shipley
- NRHP reference No.: 96000478
- Added to NRHP: April 26, 1996

The Leo Ellis Post #22, American Legion Building is a historic American Legion building located at 804 Grant St. in Princeton, Mercer County, Missouri. It was built in 1935, and is a rectangular reinforced concrete structure faced in brick. It measures 30 feet by 32 feet, and features a crenelated parapet is capped by pre-formed concrete blocks.

It was added to the National Register of Historic Places in 1996.
