= American Legion Hall (Eads, Colorado) =

- U.S. National Register of Historic Places
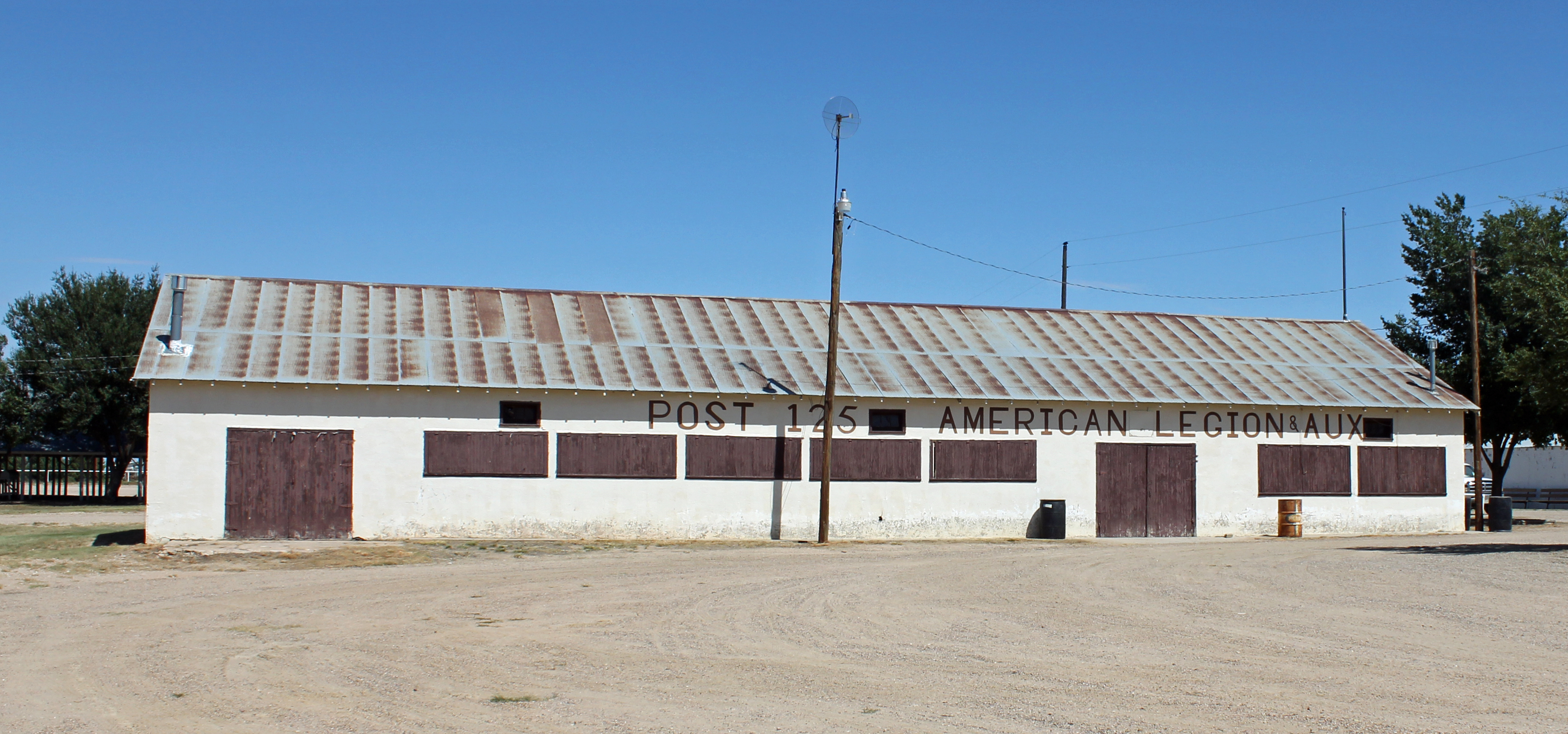
- The hall in 2013.

- Location within Colorado Location within the United States
- Nearest city: Eads, Colorado
- Coordinates: 38°29′6″N 102°47′17″W
- Area: less than one acre
- Built: 1938
- Architect: WPA
- MPS: New Deal Resources on Colorado's Eastern Plains MPS
- NRHP reference No.: 07001248
- Added to NRHP: December 11, 2007

The American Legion Hall near Eads, Colorado was built during 1937-38 under the Works Progress Administration. It is a one-story 95 by 35 feet (29 m × 11 m) building that was listed on the National Register of Historic Places in 2007. Also known as Kiowa County Fairgrounds Community Building, it served as a meeting hall and was NRHP-listed for its architecture. According to its NRHP nomination, it is a "rare surviving example of a simple, vernacular building constructed by the WPA".
