= American Legion Hall (McGill, Nevada) =

- U.S. National Register of Historic Places
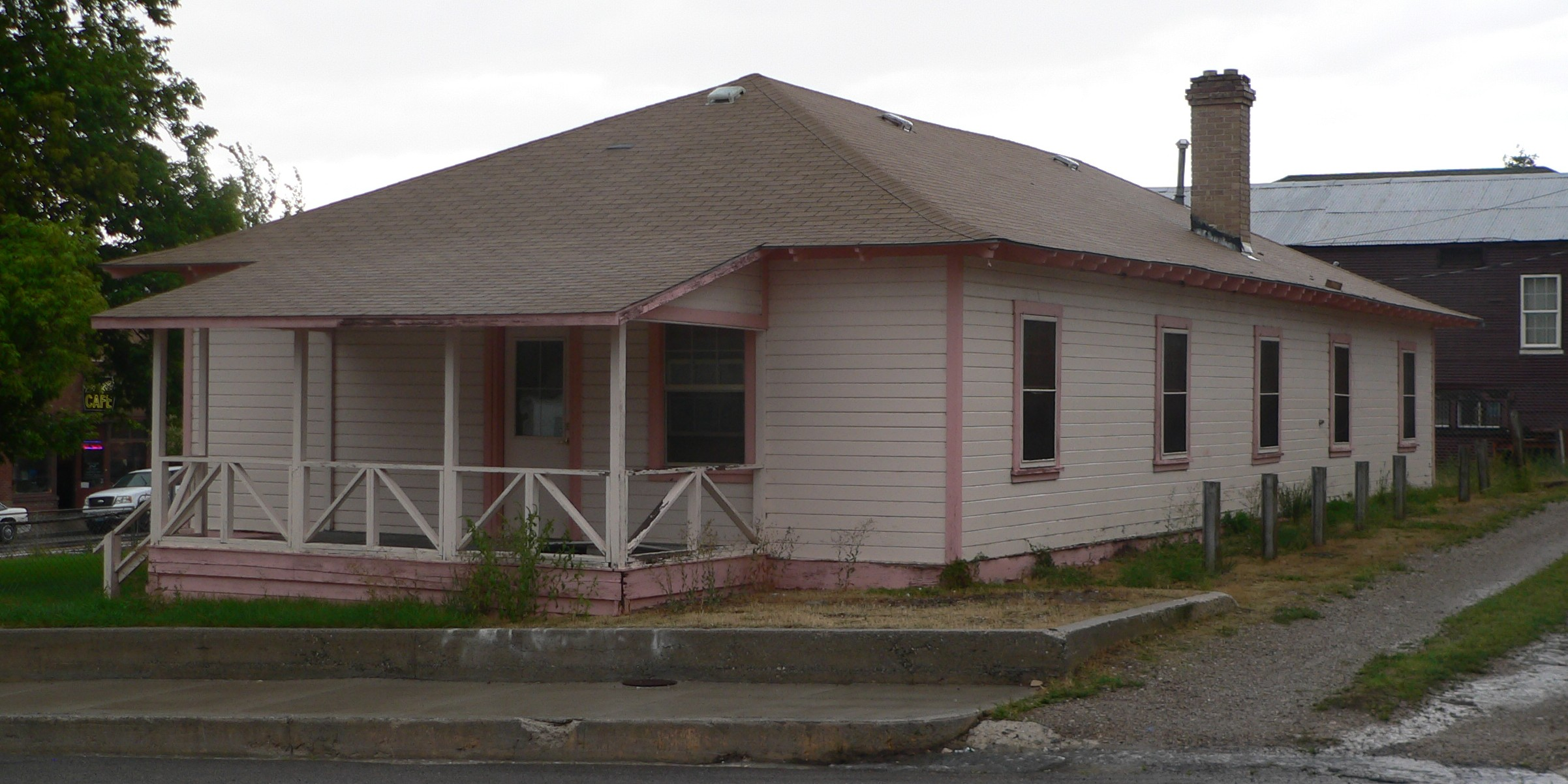
- View from the south, across Avenue J

- Location within Nevada Location within the United States
- Location: 24 Avenue J, McGill, Nevada
- Coordinates: 39°24′13.3″N 114°46′44.55″W
- Built: 1918
- Architect: Nevada Consolidated Copper Co.
- Architectural style: Bungalow/Craftsman
- NRHP reference No.: 94001404
- Added to NRHP: December 1, 1994

The American Legion Hall in McGill, Nevada, United States, was built by the Nevada Consolidated Copper Company circa 1918 as accommodations for single women working at the company's employee boarding house. In 1925 the building was moved to its present location to serve as housing for single male salaried employees.

The company gave the building to the American Legion in 1932. The original building plan of the one story balloon frame building had a central hall with bedrooms on either side. The Legion removed the interior partitions, inserting tie rods to keep the walls from spreading. Toilets and a kitchen were placed at one end, along with a small meeting room with a stone fireplace, while the remainder of the space was left open as a social hall.

The American Legion Hall functioned as a significant center of civic activity in McGill. It was placed on the National Register of Historic Places in 1994.

== See also ==
- National Register of Historic Places listings in White Pine County, Nevada
