= Newport American Legion Community Hut =

- U.S. National Register of Historic Places
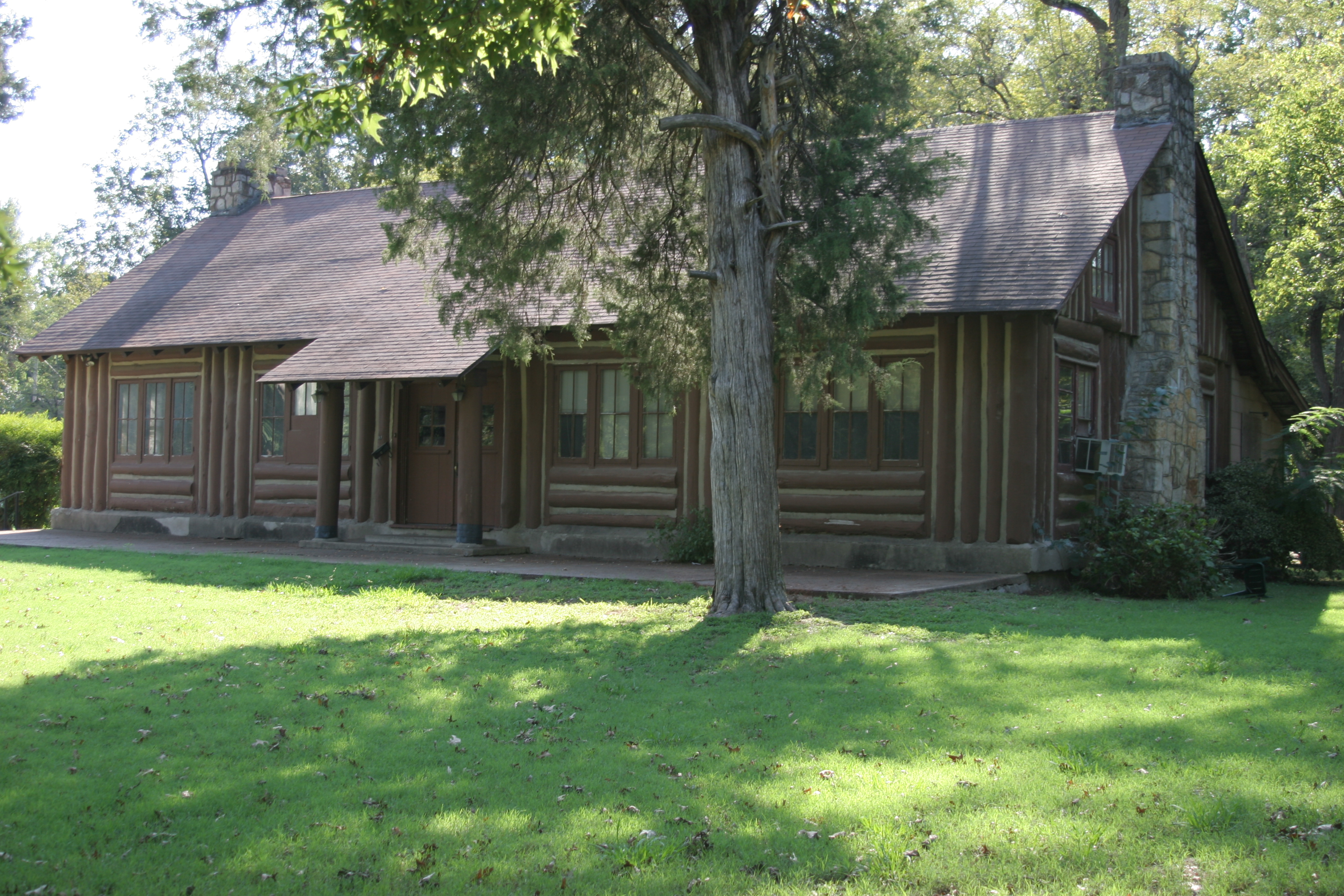

- Location within Arkansas Location within the United States
- Location: Remmel Park, N of Remmel Ave., Newport, Arkansas
- Coordinates: 35°36′3″N 91°16′32″W
- Area: 1.5 acres (0.61 ha)
- Built: 1934
- Architect: Martin, Willis and Curry; Morrow, Franklin H.
- Architectural style: Rustic
- NRHP reference No.: 92001672
- Added to NRHP: December 10, 1992

The Newport American Legion Community Hut is a historic log meeting hall in Remmel Park, north of Remmel Avenue, in Newport, Arkansas. It is a single-story structure, with a gable roof, and a front porch with a shed roof supported by log columns. The interior has retained all of its exposed log framing. A storage building, also built of logs at the same time, stands nearby. The hall was built in 1934 as part of the improvements to Remmel Park, and was designed to serve both the local American Legion chapter and the community.

The building was listed on the National Register of Historic Places in 1992.

== See also ==
- National Register of Historic Places listings in Jackson County, Arkansas
