= Lynn Shelton American Legion Post No. 27 =

- U.S. National Register of Historic Places
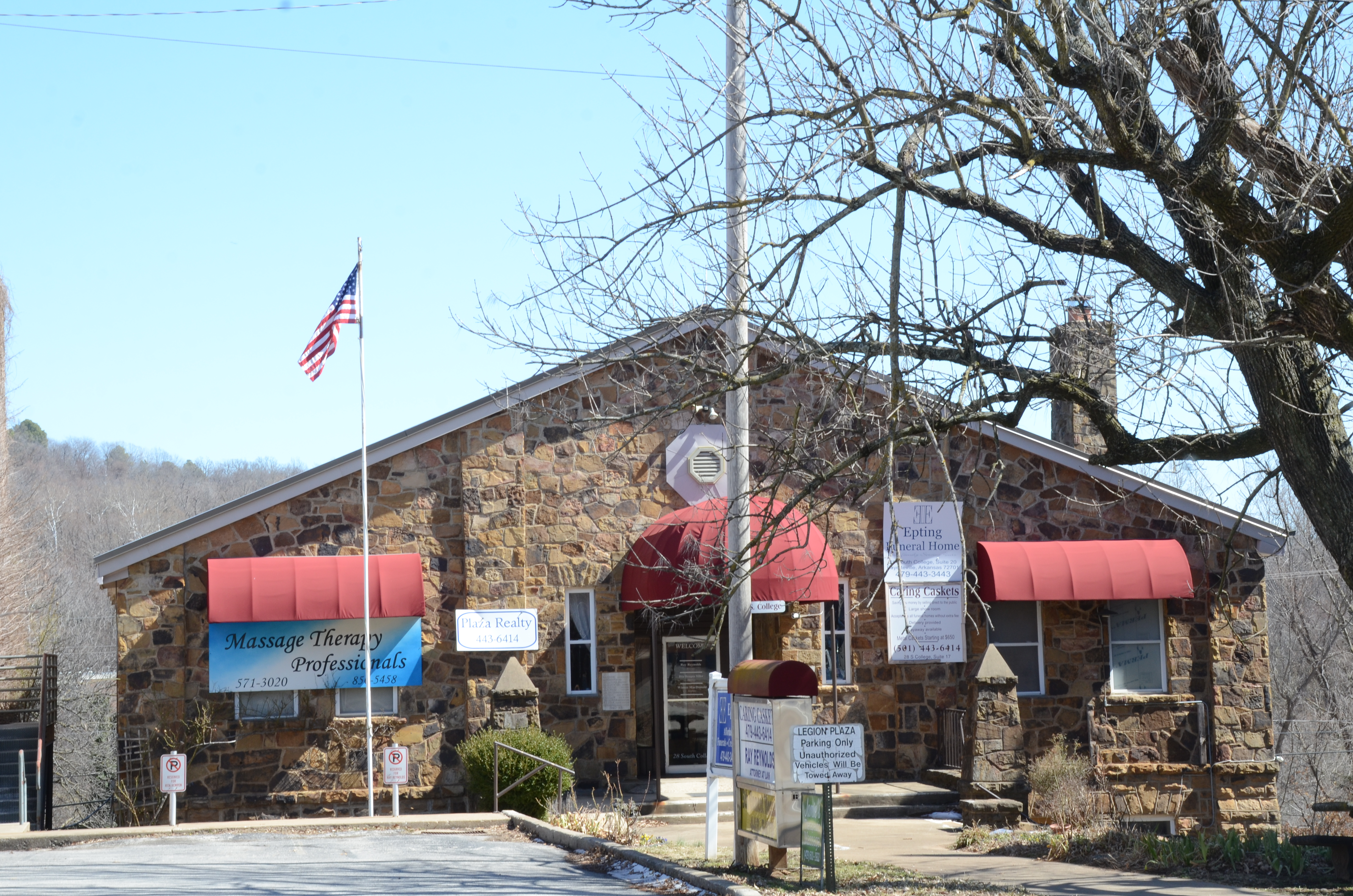

- Location within Arkansas Location within the United States
- Location: 28 S. College Ave., Fayetteville, Arkansas
- Coordinates: 36°03′43″N 94°09′27″W
- Area: less than one acre
- Built: 1940
- Architect: Shelton, T. Ewing
- Architectural style: Plain Traditional
- NRHP reference No.: 95001480
- Added to NRHP: January 4, 1996

The Lynn Shelton American Legion Post No. 27 is a historic clubhouse at 28 South College Avenue in Fayetteville, Arkansas. It is a two-story stone building, designed by local architect T. Ewing Shelton and built in 1939–40. The first floor consists of courses of quarry-faced ashlar stone, while the second consists of rough-cut rubblestone laid in irregular courses. It was built for the local chapter of the American Legion, and sold into private hands in 1994. It now houses office space.

The building was listed on the National Register of Historic Places in 1996.

== See also ==
- National Register of Historic Places listings in Washington County, Arkansas
