= Perryville American Legion Building =

- U.S. National Register of Historic Places
- U.S. Historic district – Contributing property
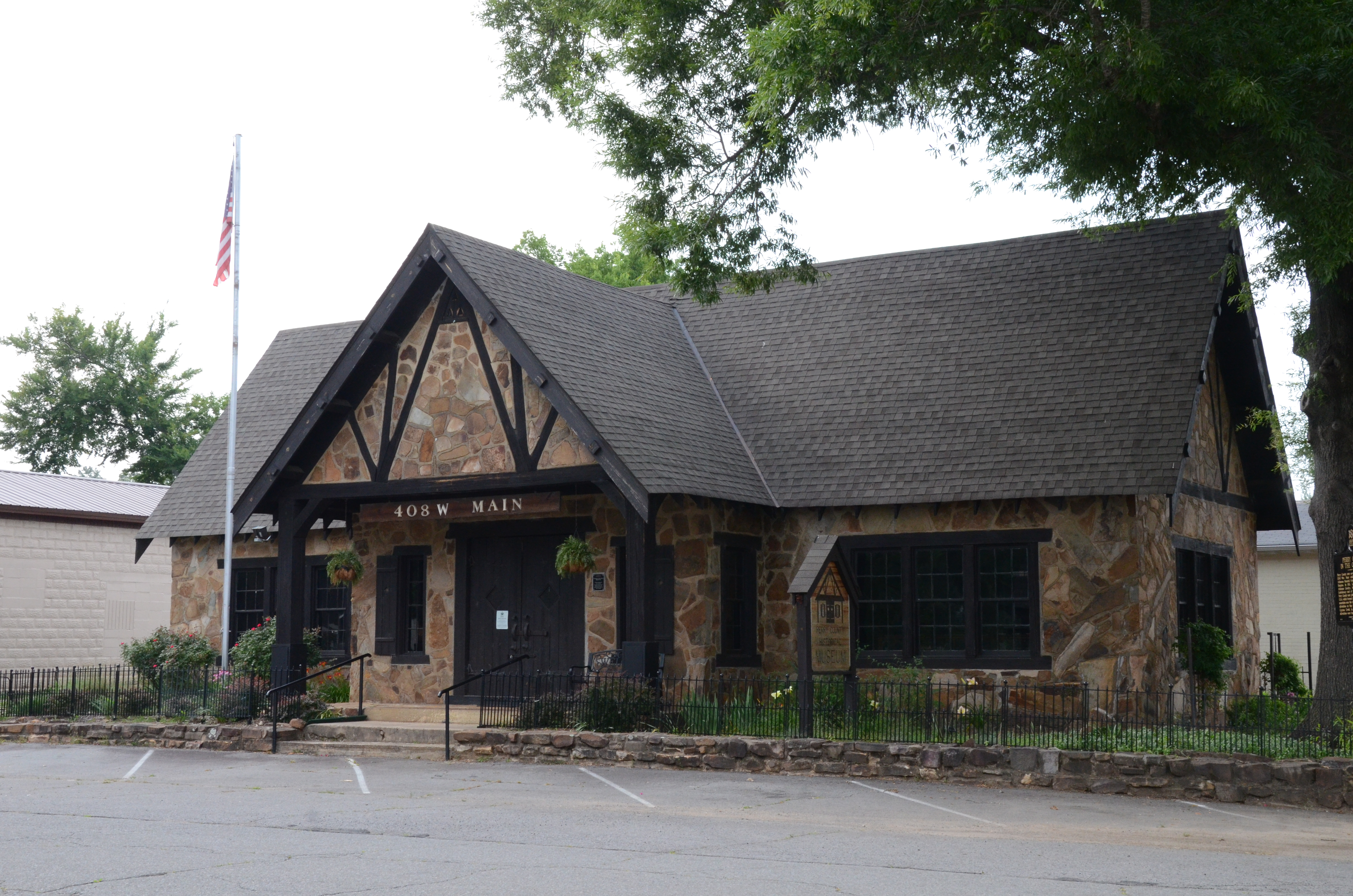

- Location within Arkansas Location within the United States
- Location: 408 W. Main Street; Perryville, Arkansas
- Coordinates: 35°0′18″N 92°48′12″W
- Area: less than one acre
- Built: 1935
- Architectural style: Rustic
- Part of: Perryville Commercial Historic District (ID11001048)
- NRHP reference No.: 90001377

Significant dates
- Added to NRHP: September 05, 1990
- Designated CP: January 26, 2012

The Perryville American Legion Building is a historic fraternal meeting hall at 408 W. Main Street in Perryville, Arkansas. It is a single story masonry building with Rustic and Tudor styling. It has a steeply pitched gable roof, with a projecting gabled entry vestibule facing the street. The gable ends are decorated with half-timbering, and the roof eaves show exposed rafter ends in the Craftsman style. The hall was built in 1935 by the Civilian Conservation Corps, and is the community's best example of the Rustic style.

The building was listed on the U.S. National Register of Historic Places in 1990. It now contains the Perry County Historical Museum.

== See also ==
- National Register of Historic Places listings in Perry County, Arkansas
