= Milton-Myers American Legion Post No. 65 =

- U.S. National Register of Historic Places
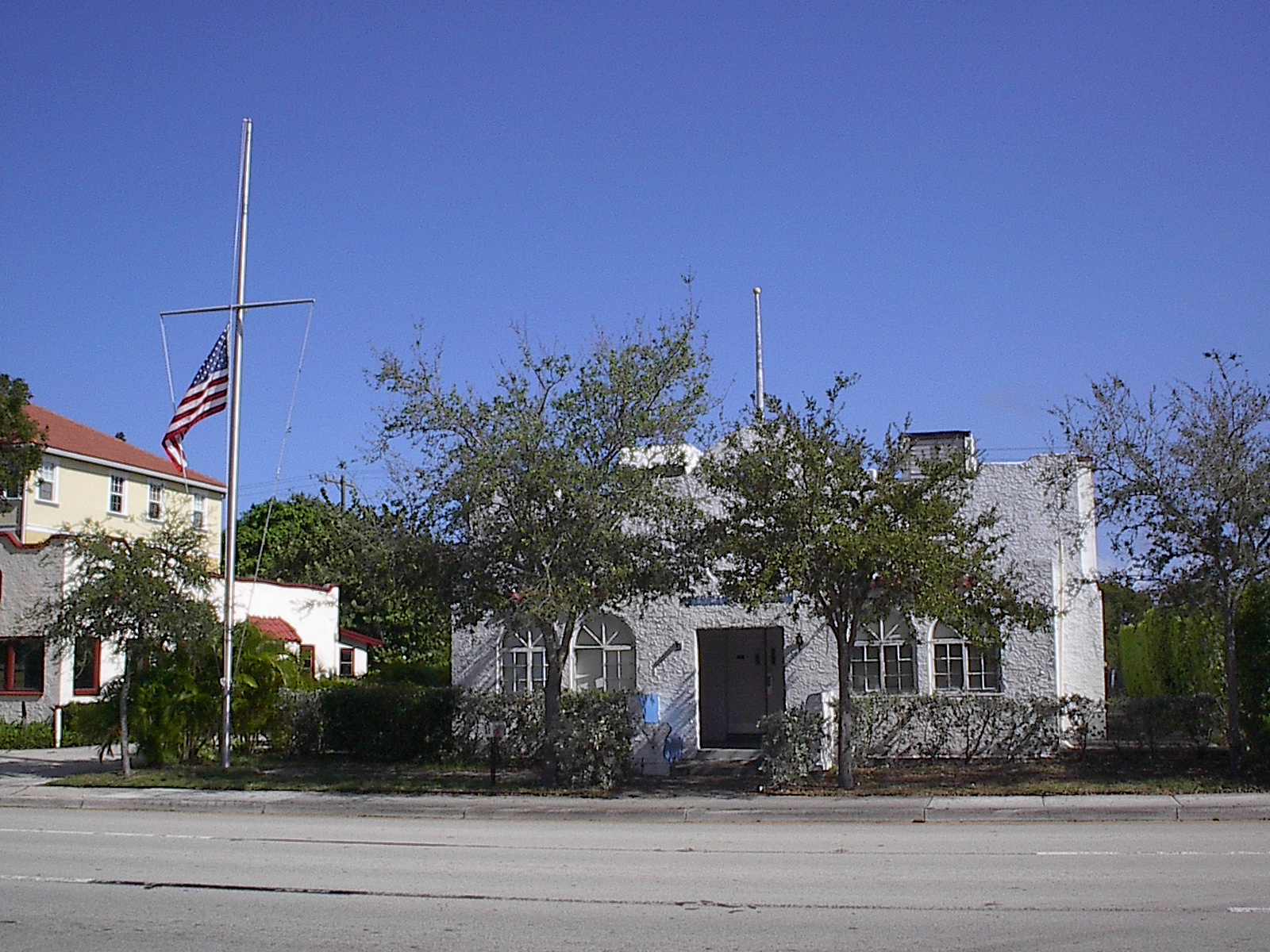
- The Milton-Myers American Legion Hall in Delray Beach houses American Legion, American Legion Auxiliary and Sons of the American Legion functions.

- Location within Florida Location within the United States
- Location: Delray Beach, Florida, United States
- Coordinates: 26°27′57″N 80°4′5″W
- Built: 1921
- Architectural style: Mission Revival
- NRHP reference No.: 95000471
- Added to NRHP: April 20, 1995

The Milton-Myers American Legion Post No. 65 is a historic site in Delray Beach, Florida, United States. It is located at 263 Northeast 5th Avenue. On April 20, 1995, it was added to the U.S. National Register of Historic Places. Some restoration work has been conducted since then on this building, a rectangular masonry and Mission Revival-style structure that has been referred to as "the Little Alamo of Delray Beach" by local residents.

The Milton-Myers Post was chartered by the American Legion in 1920, named in honor of two Delray Beach residents who died while in service during World War I. The post building was constructed the next year and dedicated at 11:00 a.m. on November 11, 1922, four years to the hour after the end of World War I. The building remains in use by the post, making it the oldest post in Florida that has always used the same building.

== History and description ==
Marvin W. Milton and Loney Myers, two soldiers from Delray Beach killed in action during World War I, are the namesake of American Legion Post No. 65. The American Legion was charted by Congress in 1919. By the following year, Florida alone had 68 American Legion posts and a membership of around 4,000 veterans. A post was established in Delray Beach in May 1920, which received full cognition in November. Albert L. Miller, who in 1910 established the city's first Boy Scout troop and later served as mayor of Delray Beach in the early 1940s, was named the post's first commander. Upon the founding of American Legion Post No. 65, they had 15 members.

In 1921, the post purchased land for a building. A local contractor named John I. Thieme was tasked with erecting this structure, although members of the post and their families voluntarily worked on its construction. The post building was dedicated at 11:00, November 11, 1922, four years to the hour after the end of World War I. Located at 263 Northeast 5th Avenue, the structure is a rectangular masonry building with stucco external walls and of Mission Revival-style architecture. Some local residents refer to the building as the "Little Alamo of Delray Beach" due to its design.

At times during its existence, the post sponsored baseball teams, a Boy Scout troop, Boys State activities, scholarships, and firefighter and police departments. On April 20, 1995, the Milton-Myers American Legion Post No. 65 was listed on the National Register of Historic Places. Revitalization work on the building began two years later. The post received a restoration grant from the Florida Department of State's Division of Historical Resources around 2000, but the post ran out of money after spending the $30,000 grant and $14,000 of its own funds. The post received another restoration grant in 2002 from the Delray Beach Redevelopment Agency, valued at $50,000. Between 2009 and 2012, the post had 240 active members, but this number fell to approximately 160 by 2016. The structure remains in use by the post, making it the oldest post in Florida that has always used the same building.

== See also ==
- National Register of Historic Places listings in Palm Beach County, Florida
