= Willie Lamb Post No. 26 American Legion Hut =

- U.S. National Register of Historic Places
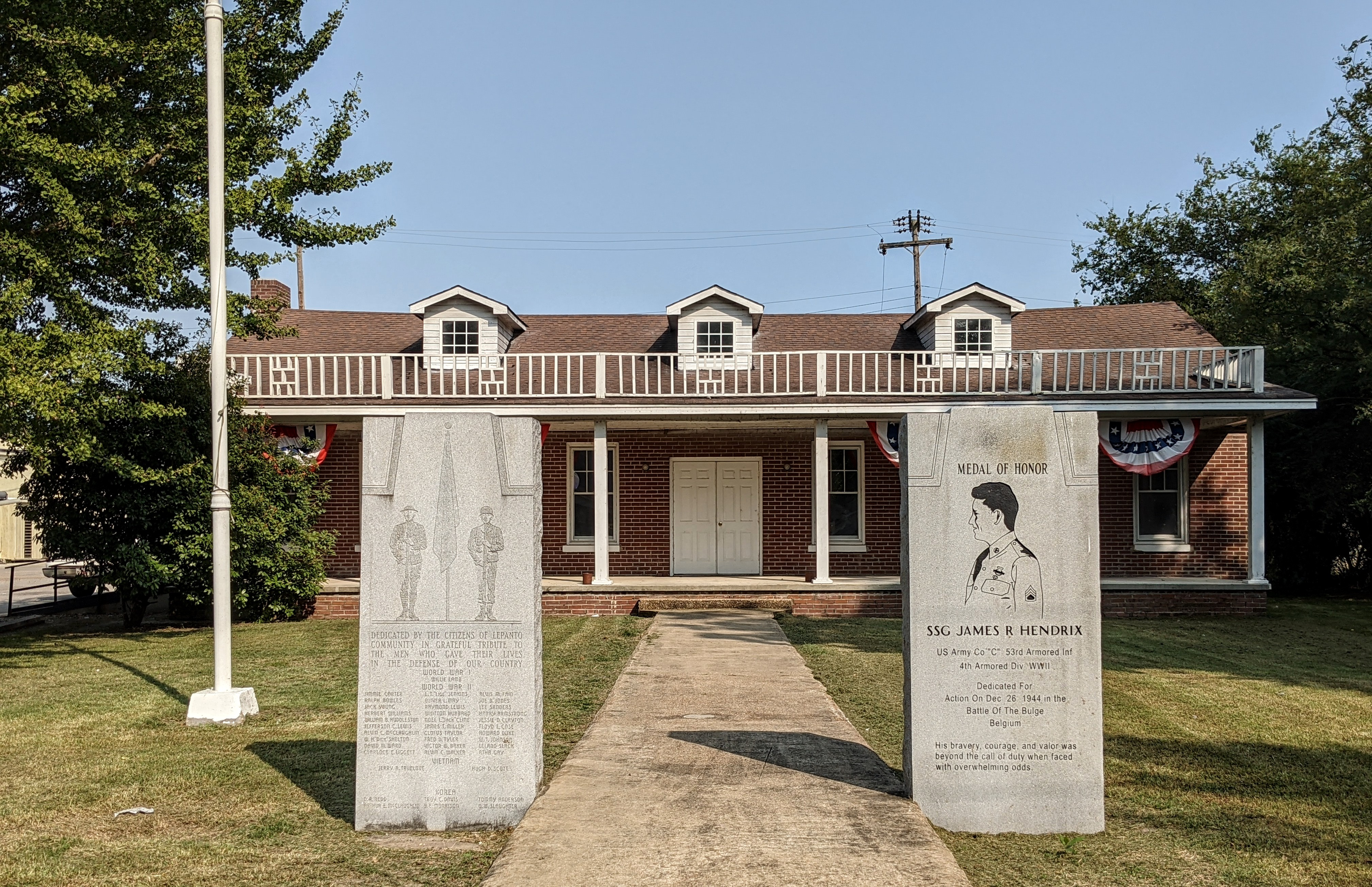

- Location within Arkansas Location within the United States
- Location: 205 Alexander St. Lepanto, Arkansas
- Coordinates: 35°36′44″N 90°19′52″W
- Area: 1 acre (0.40 ha)
- Built: 1938
- Architectural style: Classical Revival
- NRHP reference No.: 02001674
- Added to NRHP: January 8, 2003

The Willie Lamb Post No. 26 American Legion Hut is a historic society meeting hall at 205 Alexander Street in Lepanto, Arkansas. It is a single-story brick building with a side-gable roof, and a full-width shed-roof front porch supported by square posts. It was built in 1937-38 for the local chapter of the American Legion military fraternal organization, replacing an earlier building which had been built with funding assistance from the New Deal Civil Works Administration in 1932 which was flooded and then destroyed by fire. The building has long been a center of social activity in the community, as the site of dances, fundraising events, and other activities.

The building was listed on the National Register of Historic Places in 2003.

== See also ==
- National Register of Historic Places listings in Poinsett County, Arkansas
