= Nashville American Legion Building =

- U.S. National Register of Historic Places
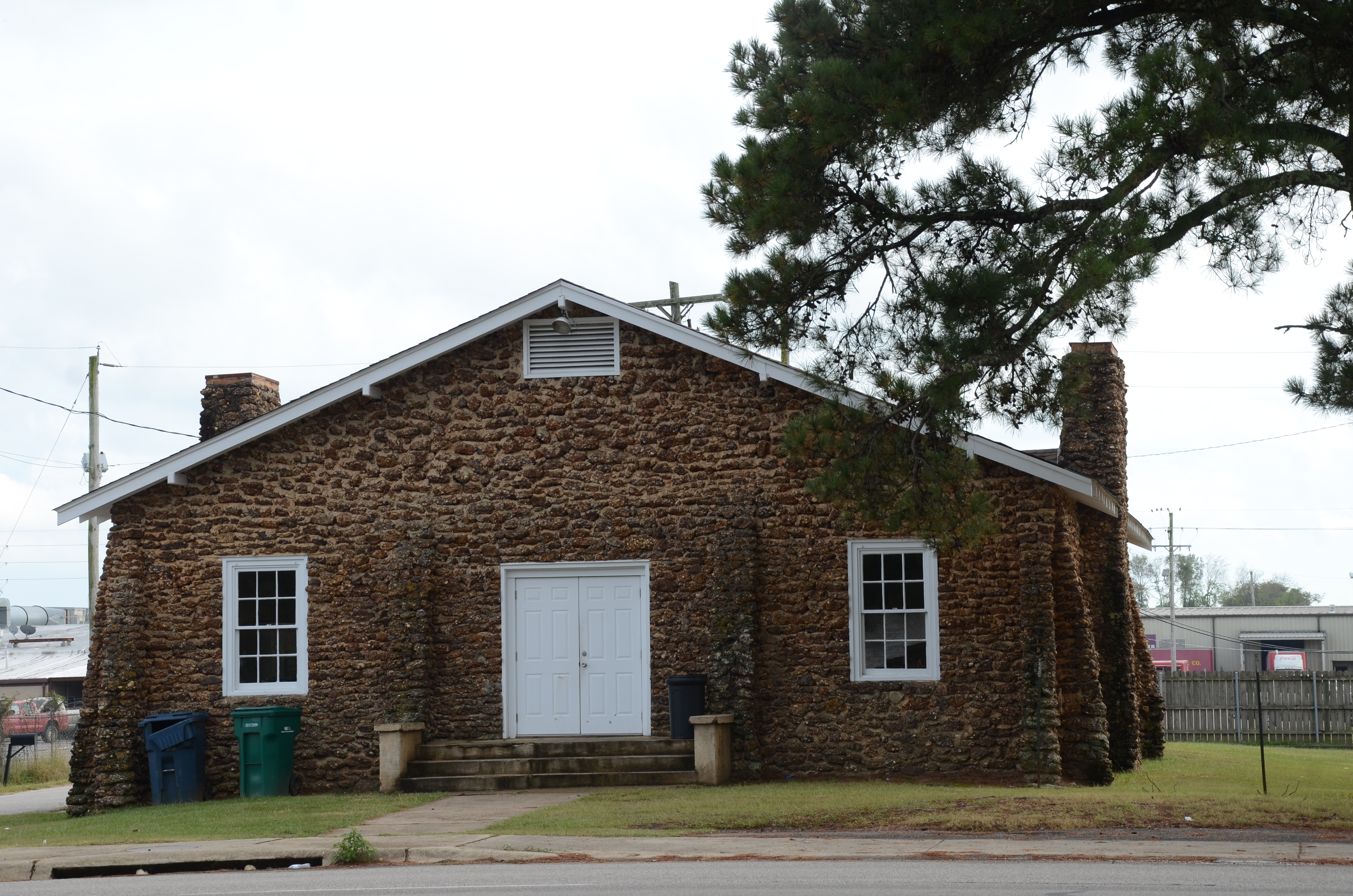

- Location within Arkansas Location within the United States
- Location: AR 27 W of Main St., Nashville, Arkansas
- Coordinates: 33°56′1″N 93°51′1″W
- Area: less than one acre
- Architectural style: Rubble
- NRHP reference No.: 90001463
- Added to NRHP: September 13, 1990

The Nashville American Legion Building is a historic American Legion hall on Arkansas Highway 27 west of Main Street, in Nashville, Arkansas. It is a single-story rubble-stone structure with vernacular Craftsman styling. Notable features include exposed rafters under the eaves, and stone "buttressing" extending from the sides and corners of the building. Built in 1930 by the Civil Works Administration, it is the only building in Nashville made out of this type of building material.

The building was listed on the U.S. National Register of Historic Places in 1990.

== See also ==
- National Register of Historic Places listings in Howard County, Arkansas
