= National Register of Historic Places listings in Lucas County, Iowa =

Location of Lucas County in Iowa

This is a list of the National Register of Historic Places listings in Lucas County, Iowa.

This is intended to be a complete list of the properties and districts on the National Register of Historic Places in Lucas County, Iowa, United States. Latitude and longitude coordinates are provided for many National Register properties and districts; these locations may be seen together in a map.

There are 16 properties listed on the National Register in the county.

This National Park Service list is complete through NPS recent listings posted December 12, 2025.

	Name on the Register	Image	Date listed	Location	City or town	Description
1	Burlington Railroad Overpass		May 15, 1998 (#98000511)	County Road S23 over the Burlington Northern railroad line 41°02′27″N 93°21′57″W	Chariton	
2	Carl L. Caviness Post 102, American Legion	Carl L. Caviness Post 102, American Legion	September 6, 2006 (#06000773)	201 S. Main St. 41°00′47″N 93°18′31″W	Chariton	
3	Chariton Cemetery Historic District	Chariton Cemetery Historic District	March 2, 2010 (#10000054)	929 S. Main St. 41°00′10″N 93°18′38″W	Chariton	
4	Chariton City Hall and Fire Station	Chariton City Hall and Fire Station	September 6, 2006 (#06000775)	115 S. Main St. 41°00′50″N 93°18′31″W	Chariton	
5	Chariton Free Public Library	Chariton Free Public Library	August 24, 2005 (#05000906)	803 Braden; 41°00′57″N 93°18′20″W	Chariton	
6	Chariton Herald-Patriot Building	Chariton Herald-Patriot Building	September 6, 2006 (#06000776)	815 Braden Ave. 41°00′57″N 93°18′22″W	Chariton	
7	Chariton Masonic Temple	Chariton Masonic Temple	September 6, 2006 (#06000777)	821 Armory Ave. 41°00′45″N 93°18′23″W	Chariton	
8	Chicago, Burlington, and Quincy Freight House-Chariton	Chicago, Burlington, and Quincy Freight House-Chariton	August 28, 2003 (#03000836)	Junction of Auburn and Brookdale; 41°01′07″N 93°18′38″W	Chariton	
9	J. T. and Mollie Crozier House	J. T. and Mollie Crozier House	October 6, 2011 (#11000721)	627 Ilion Ave. 41°01′31″N 93°18′11″W	Chariton	Architectural Career of William L. Perkins in Iowa: 1917-1957 MPS
10	First United Methodist Church	First United Methodist Church	January 24, 2002 (#01001485)	923 Roland; 41°01′01″N 93°18′29″W	Chariton	
11	Hotel Charitone	Hotel Charitone	September 6, 2006 (#06000774)	831 Braden Ave. 41°00′57″N 93°18′23″W	Chariton	
12	Lucas County Courthouse	Lucas County Courthouse	July 2, 1981 (#81000254)	Courthouse Sq. 41°00′54″N 93°18′27″W	Chariton	
13	Lucas County Courthouse Square Historic District	Lucas County Courthouse Square Historic District	August 11, 2014 (#14000324)	Braden and Court avenues and Grand and Main streets around the public square 41°00′54″N 93°18′27″W	Chariton	
14	O. E. Payne House	O. E. Payne House	July 17, 1979 (#79000912)	705 E. Auburn Ave. 41°01′06″N 93°18′14″W	Chariton	
15	A. J. Stephens House	A. J. Stephens House	November 16, 1987 (#87002020)	123 17th St. 41°00′56″N 93°19′11″W	Chariton	
16	Williamson School	Williamson School	May 1, 1998 (#98000374)	301 Williamson Ave. 41°05′22″N 93°15′36″W	Williamson	

== See also ==
- List of National Historic Landmarks in Iowa
- National Register of Historic Places listings in Iowa
- Listings in neighboring counties: Clarke, Marion, Monroe, Warren, Wayne
