= Freeman Nickerson =

Military career
- War of 1812
- Allegiance: United States
- Unit: Vermont infantry

Personal details
- Born: February 5, 1779; South Dennis, Massachusetts
- Died: January 22, 1847 (aged 67); Along the banks of the Chariton River in Iowa
- Baptism Date: April 1833
- Known For: Early Mormon missionary
- Monuments: Marker in Chariton Cemetery

Freeman Nickerson (February 5, 1779 – January 22, 1847) was an early missionary in Church of Jesus Christ of Latter Day Saints and a member of Zion's Camp.

== Life ==
Nickerson was born in South Dennis, Barnstable County, Massachusetts. He moved to Vermont in 1800 and shortly after that married Huldah Chapman. During the War of 1812 he served as a lieutenant in the Vermont infantry. After the war, Nickerson moved to Springville, Pennsylvania.

In 1824, Nickerson moved to what was then part of Perrysburgh, New York (in what is now the village of South Dayton). He later worked on the construction of the Erie Canal.

Nickerson was baptized a member of the Latter Day Saint church in April 1833 by Zerubbabel Snow. That fall, he served a mission in western New York and Upper Canada with Joseph Smith, Jr. and Sidney Rigdon. On 12 October 1833, Smith received a revelation at Nickerson's home in Perrysburgh, New York. Smith, Rigdon, and Nickerson travelled to Mount Pleasant, upper Canada, to the home of Nickerson's son.

In 1834, Nickerson was a member of Zion's Camp. In 1835, he served as branch president in Perrysburgh, New York. In the winter of 1835–1836, Nickerson served as a missionary on Cape Cod. In 1839 he and his family moved west: they spent the winter in Pittsburgh, Pennsylvania, where he baptized about 40 people and established the first branch of the church in that city. In 1840 he settled in Nauvoo, Illinois. In 1841, he served a mission to Peoria, Illinois. In 1842 he served a mission in Boston. One of his converts, Abijah Tewkesbury, offered his shipping office located at 82 Commercial St to be used as the meeting place of the first branch of Mormons in Boston, which had about 30 members.

Nickerson died in 1847 along the banks of the Chariton River in Iowa as the Latter-day Saints were moving west. He was the first known non-native to die in Chariton, Iowa.

== Personal life ==
Nickerson married Huldah Chapman (19 August 1780–22 March 1860) on 9 January 1800 in Cavendish, Vermont. They had nine children.

Nickerson was additionally married to Huldah Howes (16 August 1786–8 November 1846) in August 1845; and Eliza Becket Kent (died 28 December 1846) in 1846.
