= Battle of St Albans =

The Battle of St Albans may refer to one of the two battles fought in or near the city of St Albans during the English Wars of the Roses:

- The First Battle of St Albans was the first battle of the war and was fought on 22 May 1455.
- The Second Battle of St Albans was fought on 22 February 1461.

== See also ==
- St. Albans Raid, battle of the American Civil War.
