= J. T. and Mollie Crozier House =

Historic house in Iowa, United States

- U.S. National Register of Historic Places
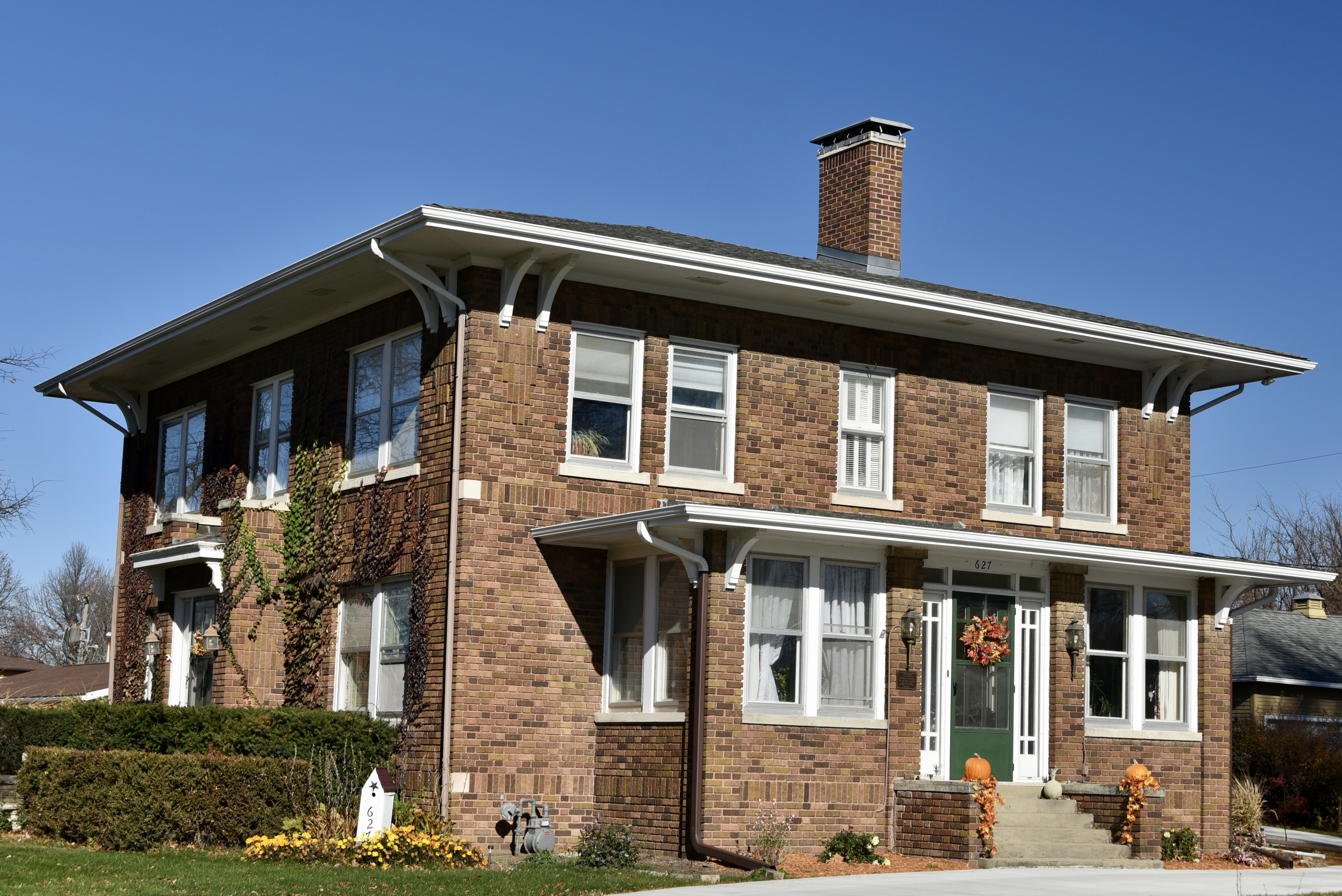

- Location within Iowa Location within the United States
- Location: 627 Ilion Ave. Chariton, Iowa
- Coordinates: 41°01′06″N 93°18′14″W
- Area: Less than one acre
- Built: 1918
- Architect: William L. Perkins
- Architectural style: Late 19th and Early 20th Century American Movements
- MPS: Architectural Career of William L. Perkins in Iowa: 1917-1957
- NRHP reference No.: 11000721
- Added to NRHP: October 6, 2011

The J. T. and Mollie Crozier House is a historic building located in Chariton, Iowa, United States. James Thomas Crozier was a native of Barnsfield, Ohio who settled here in 1878. He clerked in D.D. Waynick's store before he opened his own general store on the town square. The store remained in business until his children retired in 1974. This house replaced the family's former residence that had been destroyed in a March 1918 fire. Crozier hired local architect William L. Perkins to design this house. It is the earliest known residential example of his work. The two-story brick structure shows influences of the American Craftsman and Prairie School styles. The Prairie School is found in the house's horizontal orientation, the lowpitched hip roof, broad eaves, paired windows, the two brick belt courses, and the solarium on the south elevation. The Craftsman influences are found in the French doors, built-in cabinets, and paneling on the interior. Bricks from the house that was destroyed as well as the broad window in the first floor study, its fireplace mantel, and the kitchen windows were reused in this house. It was listed on the National Register of Historic Places in 2011.
