= Lucas County Courthouse =

Lucas County Courthouse may refer to:

- Lucas County Courthouse (Iowa), Chariton, Iowa
- Lucas County Courthouse and Jail, Toledo, Ohio
