= Carl L. Caviness Post 102, American Legion =

- Caviness, Carl L., Post 102, American Legion
- U.S. National Register of Historic Places
- U.S. Historic district – Contributing property
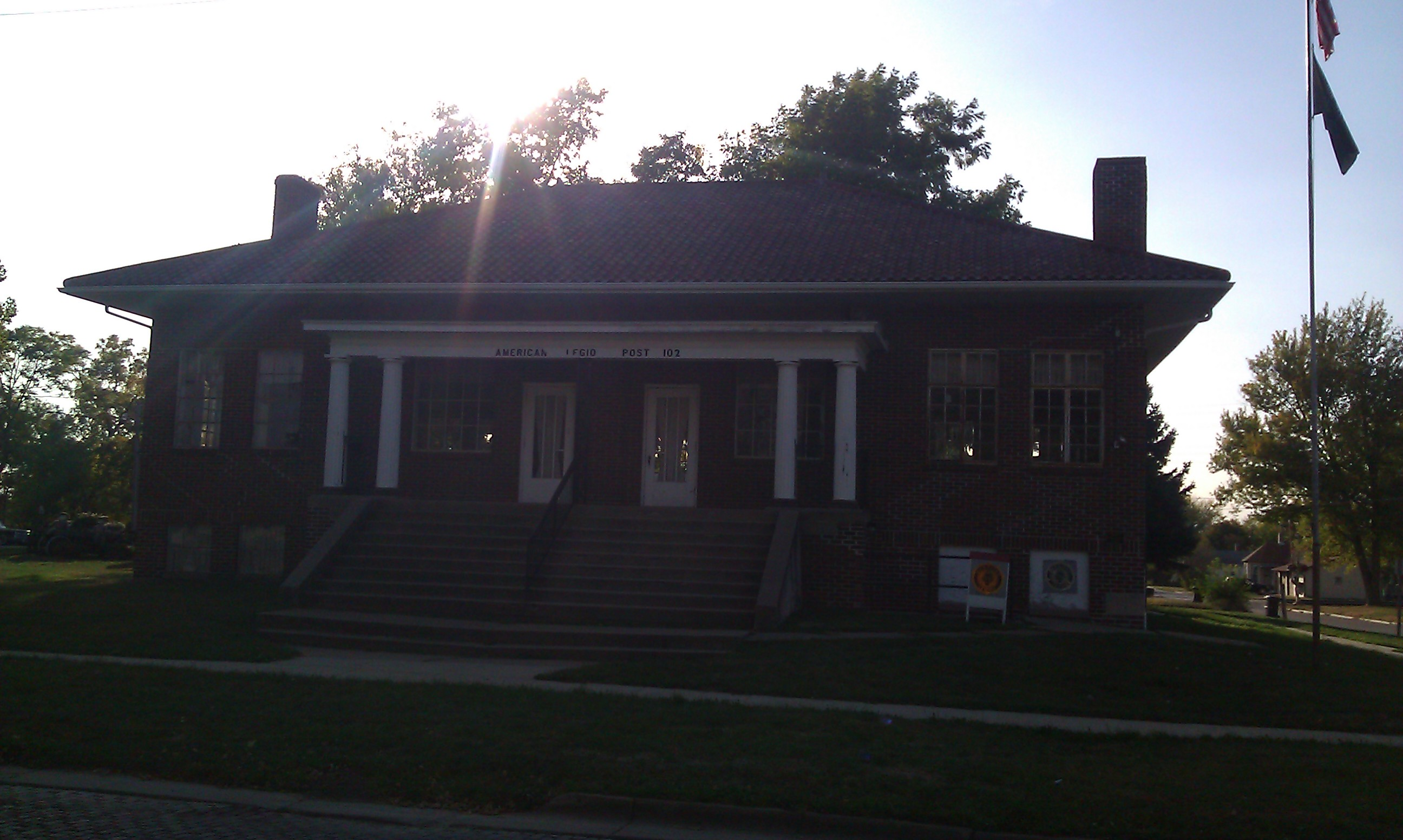

- Location within Iowa Location within the United States
- Location: 201 S. Main St. Chariton, Iowa
- Coordinates: 41°0′53″N 93°18′31″W
- Area: less than one acre
- Built: 1925
- Architect: William L. Perkins
- Architectural style: Late 19th And 20th Century Revivals
- Part of: Lucas County Courthouse Square Historic District (ID14000324)
- MPS: Architectural Career of William L. Perkins in Iowa:1917-1957 MPS
- NRHP reference No.: 06000773
- Added to NRHP: September 06, 2006

The Carl L. Caviness Post 102, American Legion was built in 1925. It reflects Late 19th and 20th Century Revivals architecture and was designed by Chariton architect William L. Perkins. In its National Register of Historic Places nomination, it was deemed "a good example of the Revival styles popular in the 1920s", a well-preserved work by William L. Perkins and an illustration of "the importance of the American Legion in the social life of the community." It was named in honor of Carl L. Caviness who was the first Lucas county resident to be killed in action during World War I.

It was individually listed on the National Register of Historic Places in 2006. The listing included two contributing buildings, the second being an attached Quonset hut that was no longer in use. In 2014 it was included as a contributing property in the Lucas County Courthouse Square Historic District.
