= Hotel Charitone =

- U.S. National Register of Historic Places
- U.S. Historic district – Contributing property
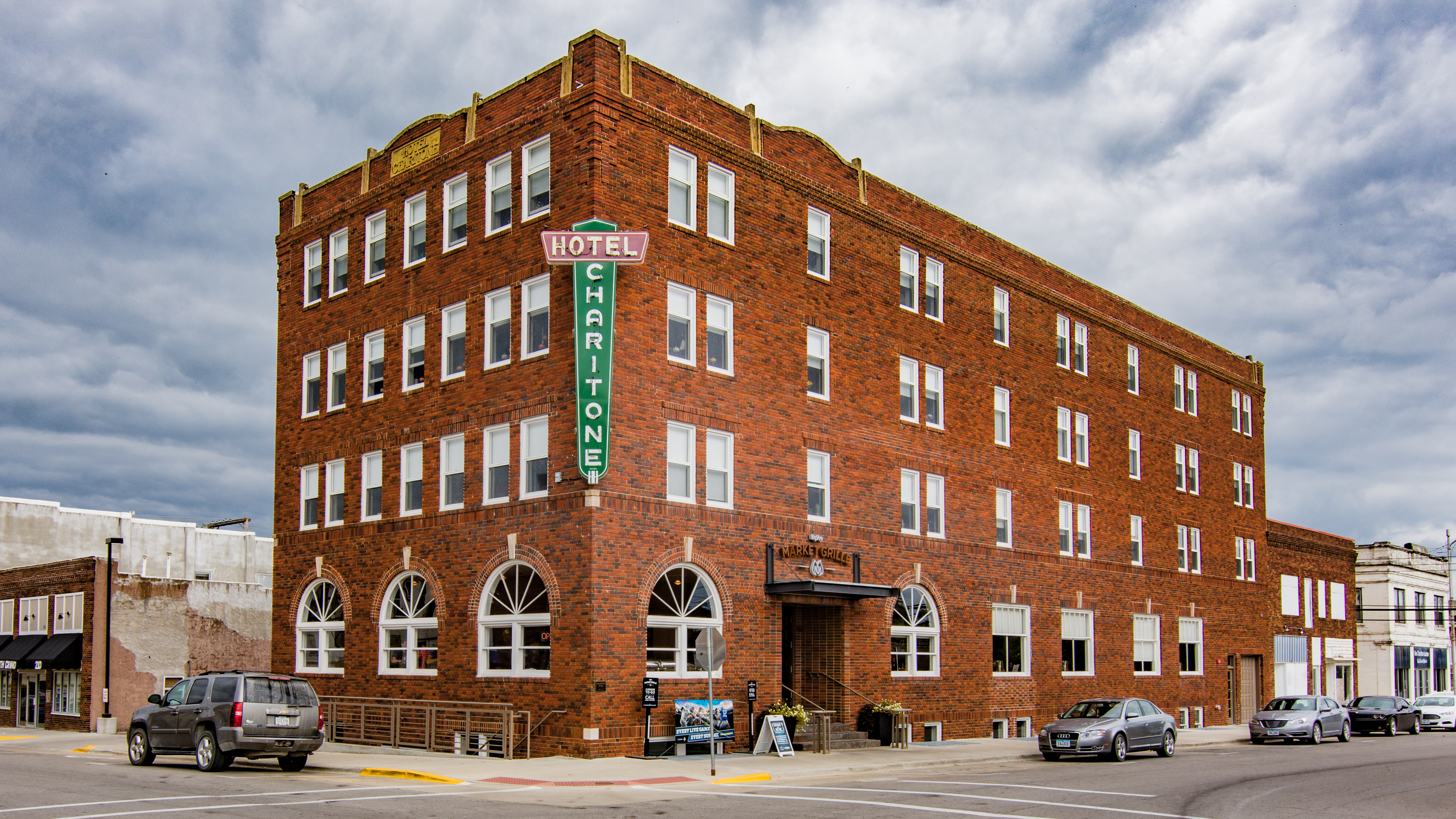

- Location within Iowa Location within the United States
- Location: 831 Braden Ave. Chariton, Iowa
- Coordinates: 41°0′57″N 93°18′23″W
- Area: Less than one acre
- Built: 1923
- Built by: P.E. Johnson
- Architect: William L. Perkins
- Architectural style: Classical Revival
- Part of: Lucas County Courthouse Square Historic District (ID14000324)
- MPS: Architectural Career of William L. Perkins in Iowa:1917-1957 MPS
- NRHP reference No.: 06000774
- Added to NRHP: September 6, 2006

Hotel Charitone is a historic building located in Chariton, Iowa, United States. Local architect William L. Perkins designed the building in the Neoclassical style. It was his second major commission in town after the Chariton Herald-Patriot Building (1918). Local contractor P.E. Johnson constructed the building. It opened on November 5, 1923, and remained in operation as a hotel with some apartments under various owners. The buildings had fallen into disrepair and was vacant when Hy-Vee, a grocery store chain that had been headquartered in Chariton for years spearheaded the renovation of the building as an act of gratitude for the community's support.

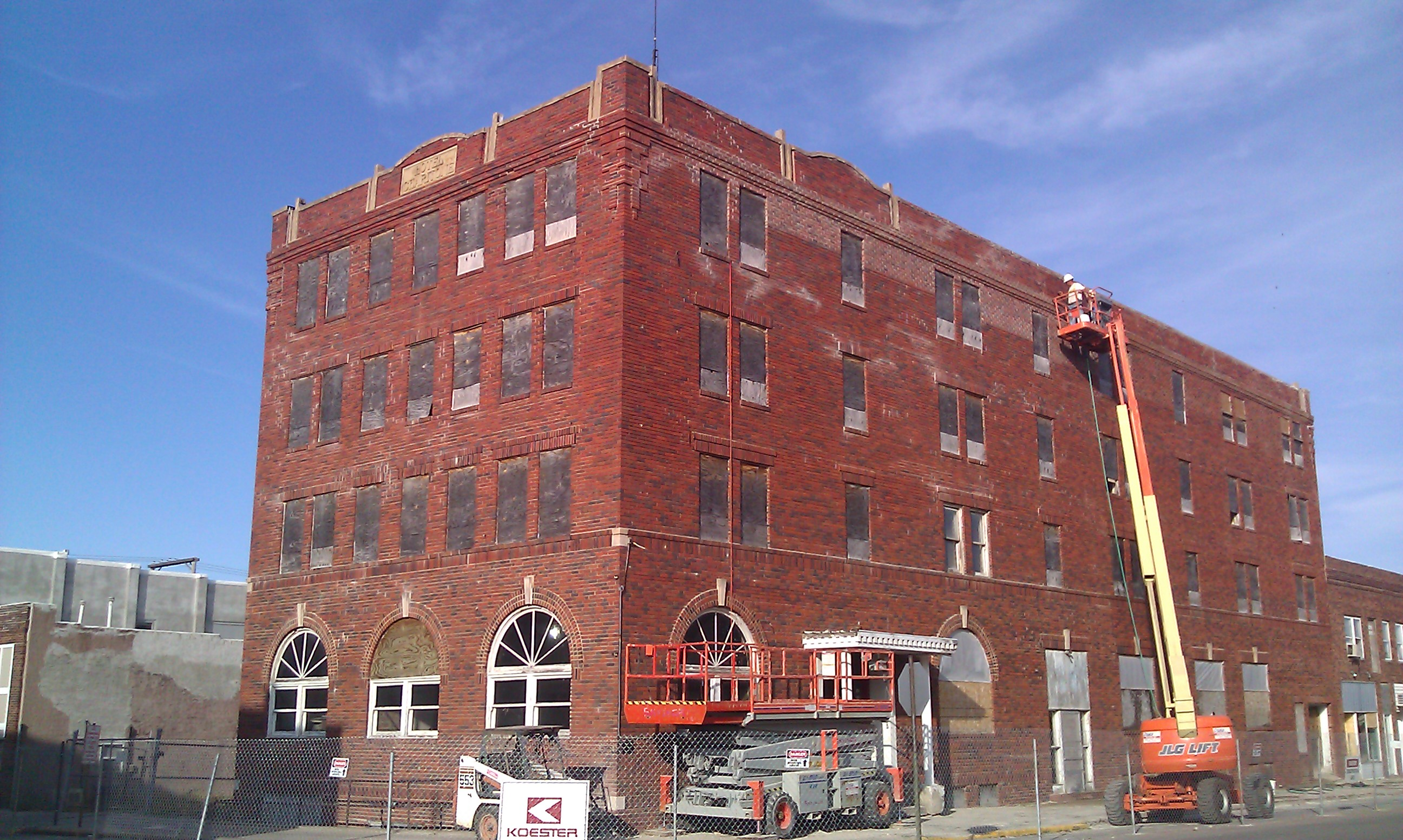
The building being renovated in 2012.

A Hy-Vee Market Grill opened in May 2014, and the upper floors house 12 apartments. The four-story brick structure features three arched windows on the first floor of the west, and two that flank the main entrance on the south elevation. A third window on this side of the building had been converted into a doorway into the hotel's restaurant by 1935. A brick parapet with stone trim caps the structure, and decorative brickwork descends from the cornice on the corners. A neon sign was added in the 1930s. The building was individually listed on the National Register of Historic Places in 2006. In 2014 it was included as a contributing property in the Lucas County Courthouse Square Historic District.
