= O. E. Payne House =

Historic house in Iowa, United States

- U.S. National Register of Historic Places
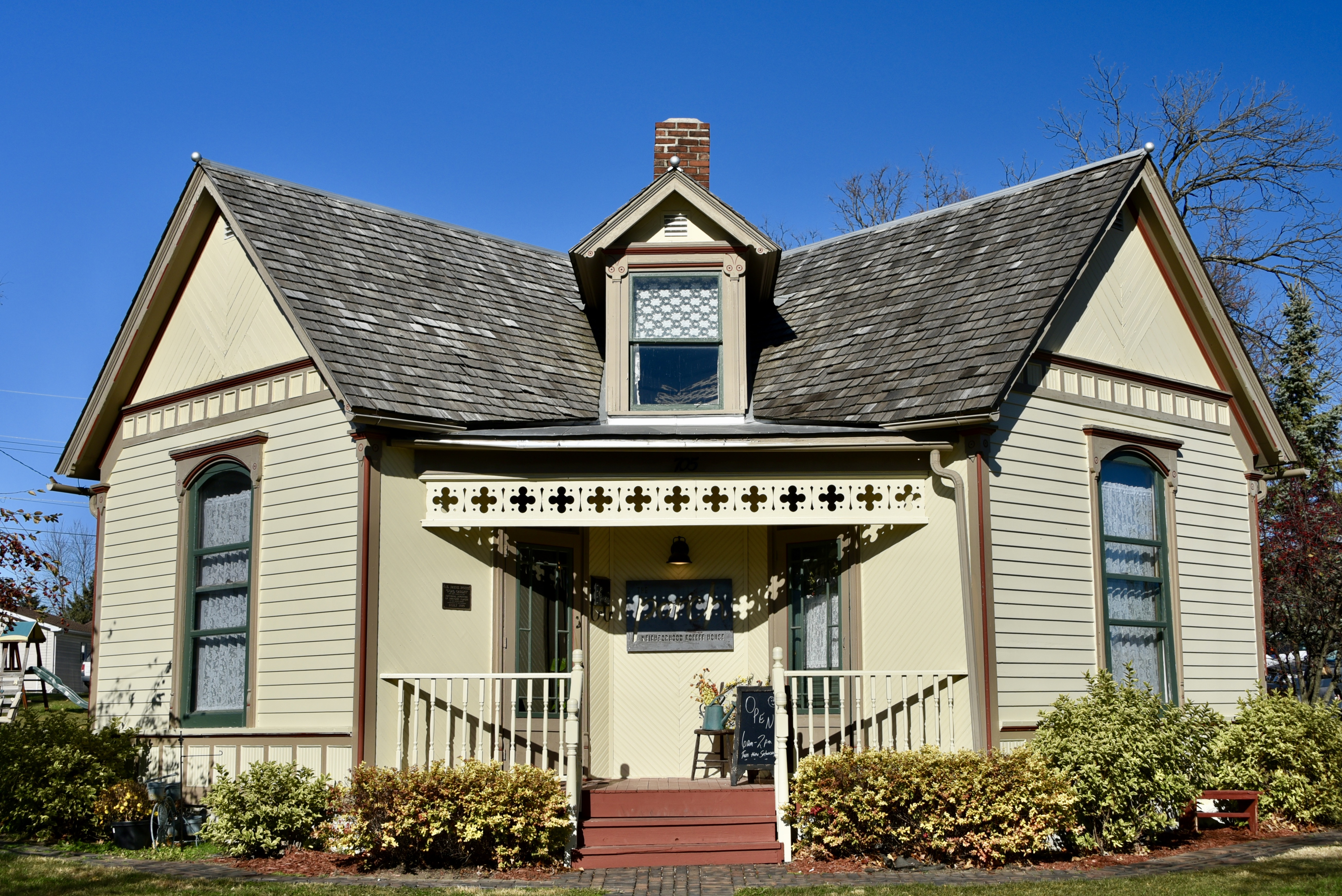

- Location within Iowa Location within the United States
- Location: 705 E. Auburn Ave. Chariton, Iowa
- Coordinates: 41°01′06″N 93°18′14″W
- Area: Less than one acre
- Built: 1889
- NRHP reference No.: 79000912
- Added to NRHP: July 17, 1979

The O. E. Payne House, also known as Dual Gables, is a historic building located in Chariton, Iowa, United States. The single-story frame house was built in 1889. Its significance is derived from its unusual architectural form that originated in the picturesque architectural tradition of the mid-19th century. It follows a Y-shaped plan with two front gables that are set at right angles from each other, and they each sit at a 45° angle to the street. Within the angle is located two entrances, above which is a wooden frieze that features quatrefoil cutouts. On the gable ends the clapboards are set in a diagonal pattern above a frieze of recessed square panels. The stem of the Y extends to the rear of the property. The house was listed on the National Register of Historic Places in 1979.
