= Chariton Public Library =

- Chariton Free Public Library
- U.S. National Register of Historic Places
- U.S. Historic district – Contributing property
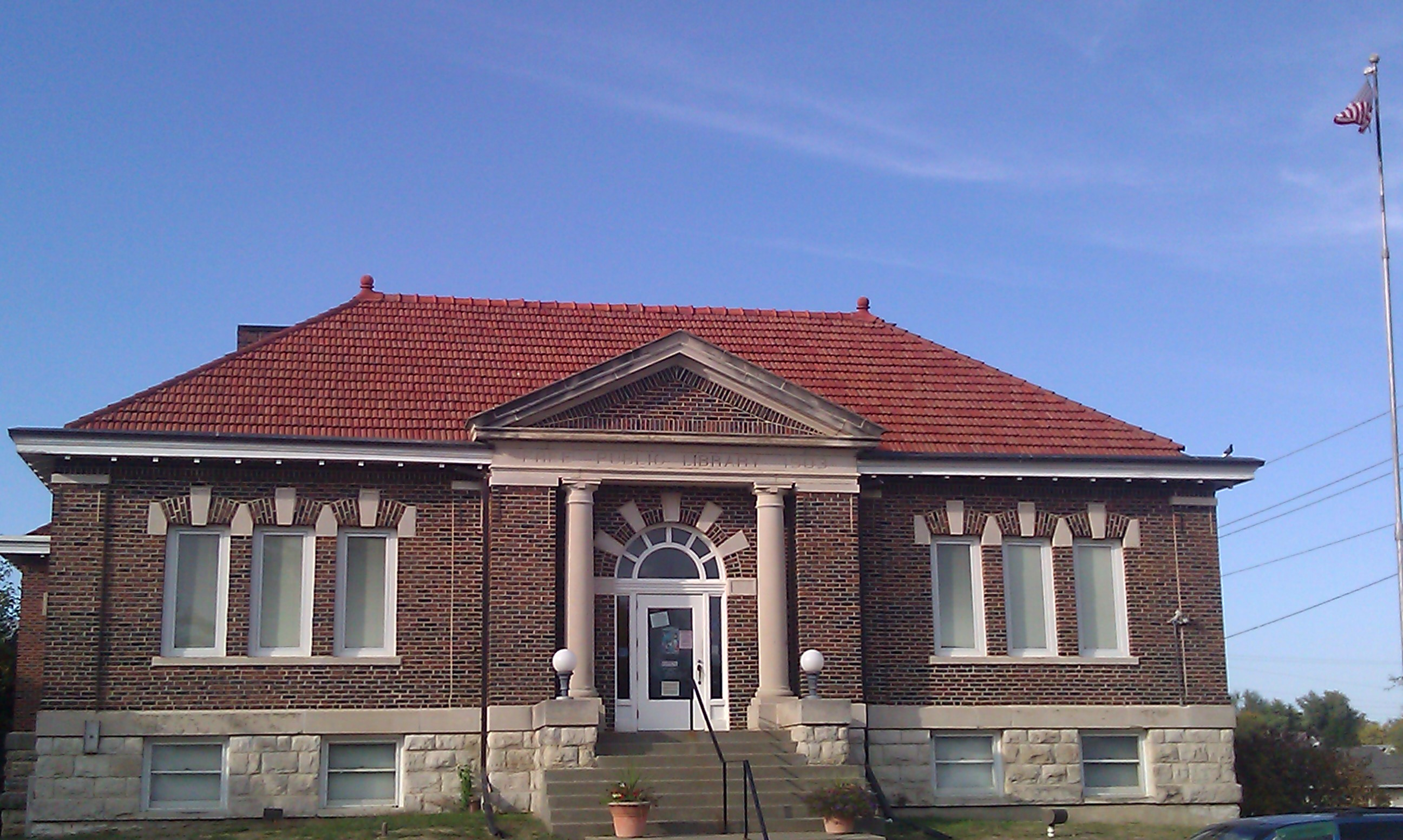

- Location within Iowa Location within the United States
- Location: 803 Braden; Chariton, Iowa
- Coordinates: 41°0′57″N 93°18′20″W
- Area: Less than one acre
- Built: 1904
- Built by: Johnson & Best
- Architect: Patton & Miller
- Architectural style: Classical Revival
- Part of: Lucas County Courthouse Square Historic District (ID14000324)
- NRHP reference No.: 05000906
- Added to NRHP: August 24, 2005

Chariton Public Library is located in Chariton, Iowa, United States. The Library and Reading Room Association was formed in Chariton in 1879, but it was short-lived. The county superintendent of schools started a teachers' library in the courthouse sometime afterward. By this time the community had a library of 800 volumes. There was an effort by study clubs in town in 1898 to raise money and establish a free public library. The Chariton Federation of Women's Clubs took the lead and opened a library with the books from the courthouse in two rooms above Gibbons Drug Store on the town square. Citizens approved a local tax to support the library the following year.

Librarian Margaret Brown and Library Board President Thomas Gay applied to the Carnegie Corporation of New York for a grant to build a library building, and on January 13, 1903, they were awarded $11,000. The Chicago architectural firm of Patton & Miller was chosen to design the new building. It was dedicated on October 28, 1904. The Neoclassical style building is a single-story structure of dark brown rock-faced brick with Bedford stone trim. The symmetrical facade features a projecting portico with stone columns in the Doric order, brick pilasters, a stone cornice, and a triangular brick and stone pediment. The building is capped with a hip roof The interior plan of the building became known as the "Chariton Plan" because it was first used here before it was used for other libraries in Iowa.

In 1993 the Mason City, Iowa architectural firm of Bergland & Cram designed an addition that was added to the rear of the building. The library building was individually listed on the National Register of Historic Places in 2005. In 2014 it was included as a contributing property in the Lucas County Courthouse Square Historic District.
