= A. J. Stephens House =

US historic place located in Chariton, Iowa

- U.S. National Register of Historic Places
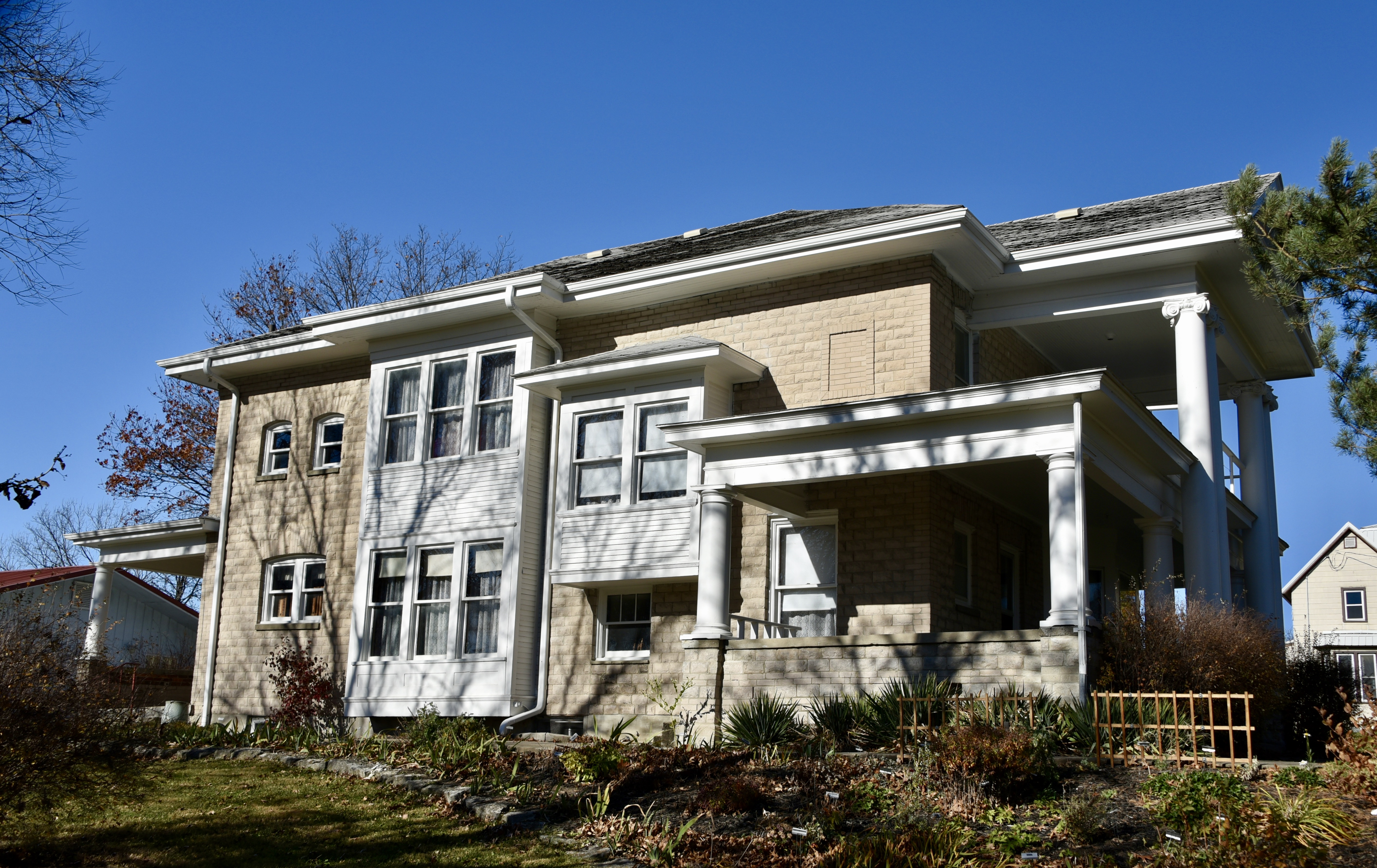

- Location within Iowa Location within the United States
- Interactive map showing the location of A.J. Stephens House
- Location: 123 17th St. Chariton, Iowa
- Coordinates: 41°0′56″N 93°19′11″W
- Area: Less than one acre
- Built: 1908
- Built by: A. J. Stephens
- NRHP reference No.: 87002020
- Added to NRHP: November 16, 1987

The A. J. Stephens House, also known as the Carpenter House and the Lucas County Historical Society Museum, is a historic building located in Chariton, Iowa, United States. The two-story concrete block structure was built by Stephens as his family's home in 1908. He was a local contractor and the house was a showcase for masonry products and his skill in using them. The house is a larger version of the American Foursquare. On the front is a two-story Neoclassical style porch. The Lucas County Historical Society bought the house in 1966 for use as a museum. The house was listed on the National Register of Historic Places in 1987.
