= Williamson School (Williamson, Iowa) =

- U.S. National Register of Historic Places
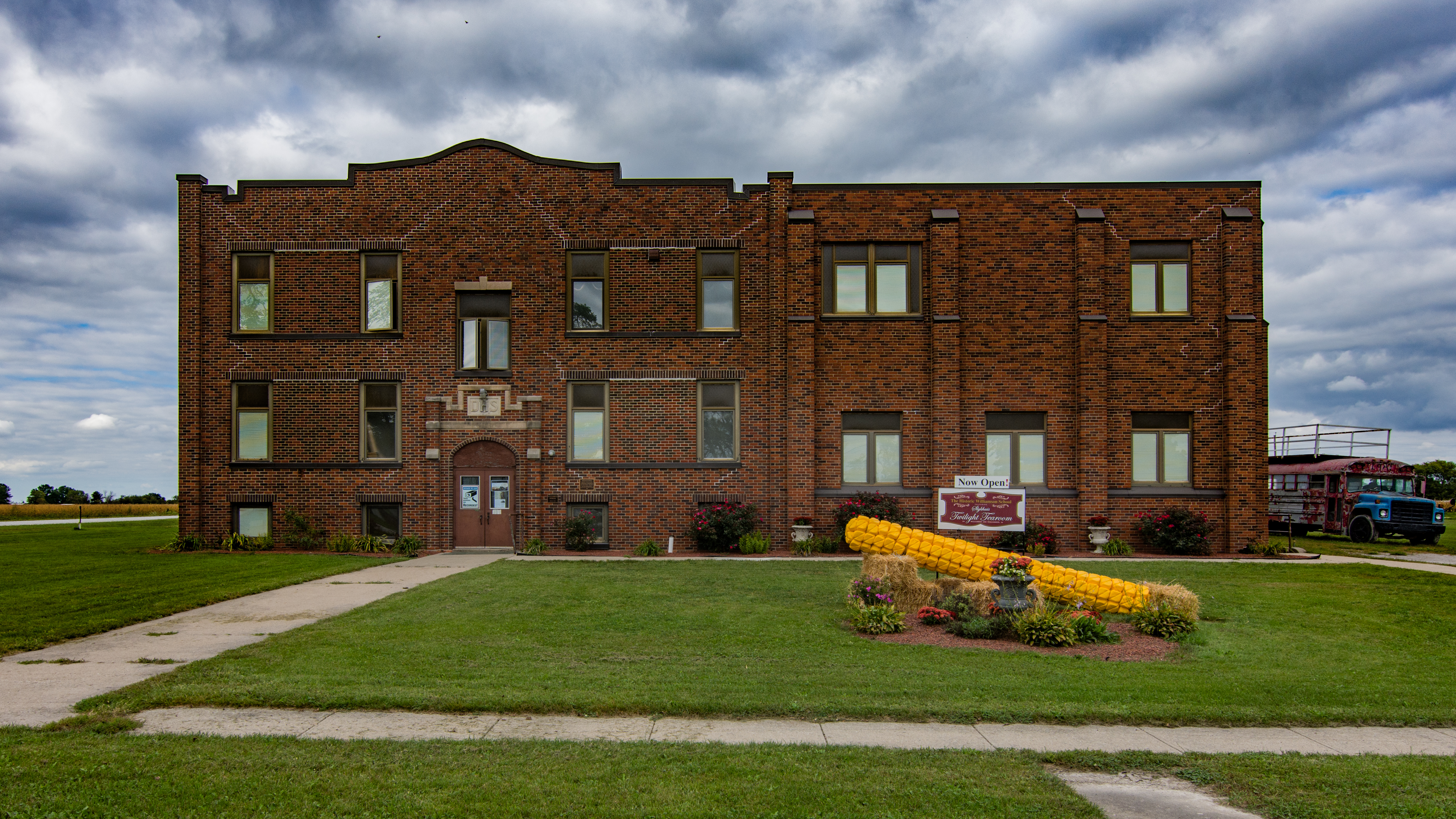

- Location within Iowa Location within the United States
- Location: 301 Williamson Ave. Williamson, Iowa
- Coordinates: 41°05′22″N 93°15′36″W
- Area: 2 acres (0.81 ha)
- Built: 1923
- Built by: D.A. Enslow & Son
- Architect: W.L. Perkins
- Architectural style: Late 19th and 20th Century Revivals
- NRHP reference No.: 98000374
- Added to NRHP: May 1, 1998

Williamson School, also known as District High School, is a historic building located in Williamson, Iowa, United States. George E. Williamson, for whom the town was named, built the first school buildings in town. As they became too small, the local school district decided to build a larger structure. Chariton, Iowa architect W.L. Perkins designed the two-story brick building, and D.A. Enslow & Son, also of Chariton, constructed the building. The school opened with 11 grades in September 1923 and it graduated its first class in 1926. The gymnasium and auditorium were built in 1929.

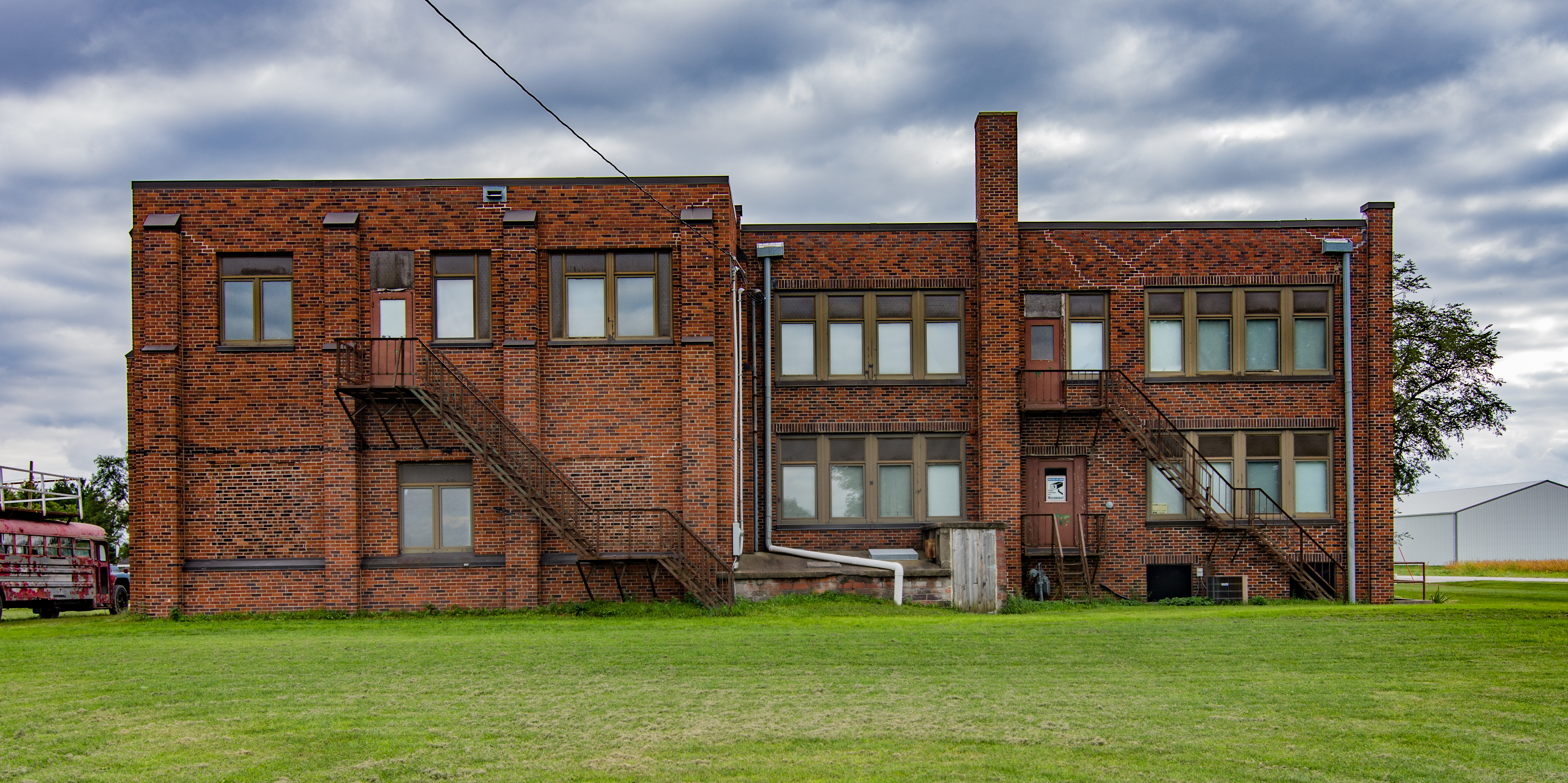
Rear view of building

Because Williamson was a mining town many boys left school to work in the mines when they were physically able. Williamson School Superintendent Kridelbaugh developed what became known as the "Kridelbaugh System" where boys would continue to work in the mines and go to school part-time. Several of the boys eventually graduated from the school. The last graduating class from high school was in 1944, and the building continued to house kindergarten through eighth grade until 1959. At that time the school became a part of the Chariton Community School District and became known as Williamson Elementary School. In June 1995 the school was discontinued. The building was sold to the Williamson Historical Society the following year. It was listed on the National Register of Historic Places in 1998. The building now houses the Slykhuis Twilight Tea Room.
