= Chariton Cemetery =

Historic cemetery in Chariton, Iowa

- Chariton Cemetery Historic District
- U.S. National Register of Historic Places
- U.S. Historic district
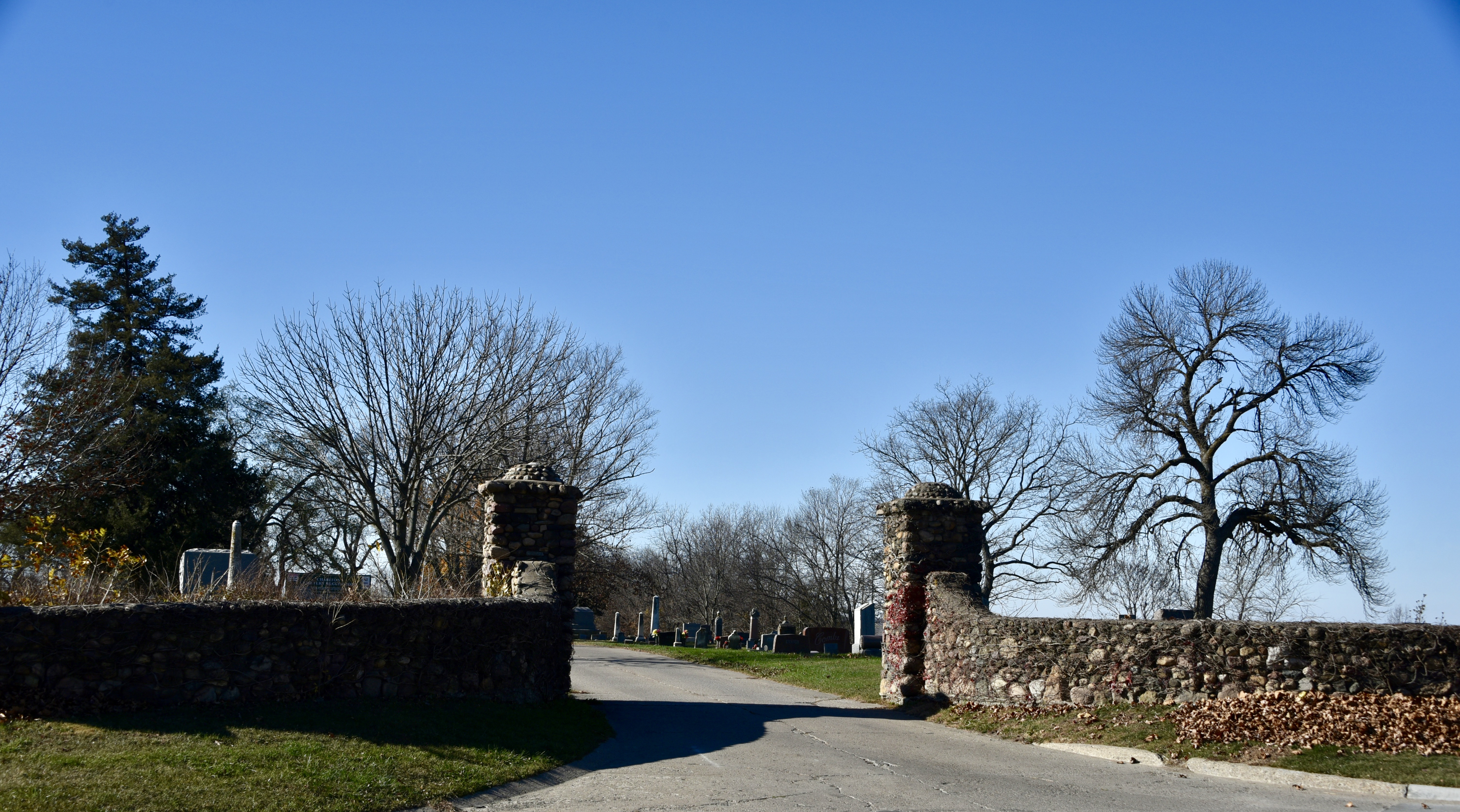
- Main entrance gate and walls (1937)

- Location within Iowa Location within the United States
- Location: 929 S. Main St. Chariton, Iowa
- Coordinates: 41°0′10″N 93°18′38″W
- Area: 45 acres (18 ha)
- Architect: Ray F. Wyrick; E.H. Best
- Architectural style: Bungalow/Craftsman
- NRHP reference No.: 10000054
- Added to NRHP: March 2, 2010

Chariton Cemetery is located in Chariton, Iowa, United States. It was listed as a historic district on the National Register of Historic Places in 2010. At the time of its nomination the district consisted of five resources, including one contributing building, two contributing sites, one contributing structure, and one non-contributing building. The Chariton Cemetery Company was incorporated in 1864 as a private cemetery. It was sold to the city for $10,000 in 1924. That same year they hired Des Moines landscape architect Ray F. Wyrick to plan the landscaping and for future expansion. The plan he came up with was the rural cemetery concept. He replaced its formal garden design with curving roadways and waterways that reflected its natural setting. Babyland for infant burials was created in 1930. He also designed the north entrance gate, which was built with Works Progress Administration funds in 1937. Wyrick continued to work with the cemetery into the 1960s.

An English cottage-style building was built in 1929 as a rest house/chapel. It was designed and built by local contractor E.H. Best. It features a brick exterior with stucco trim, and half-timbering in the gable end. Its exposed rafter ends are elements of the American Craftsman style. Wyrick's entrance gates utilize the same style. A steel maintenance building is the non-contributing building.

== Notable people ==
- Freeman Nickerson (1779–1847) – missionary
