= Chariton City Hall and Fire Station =

Historic building in Iowa, United States

- U.S. National Register of Historic Places
- U.S. Historic district – Contributing property
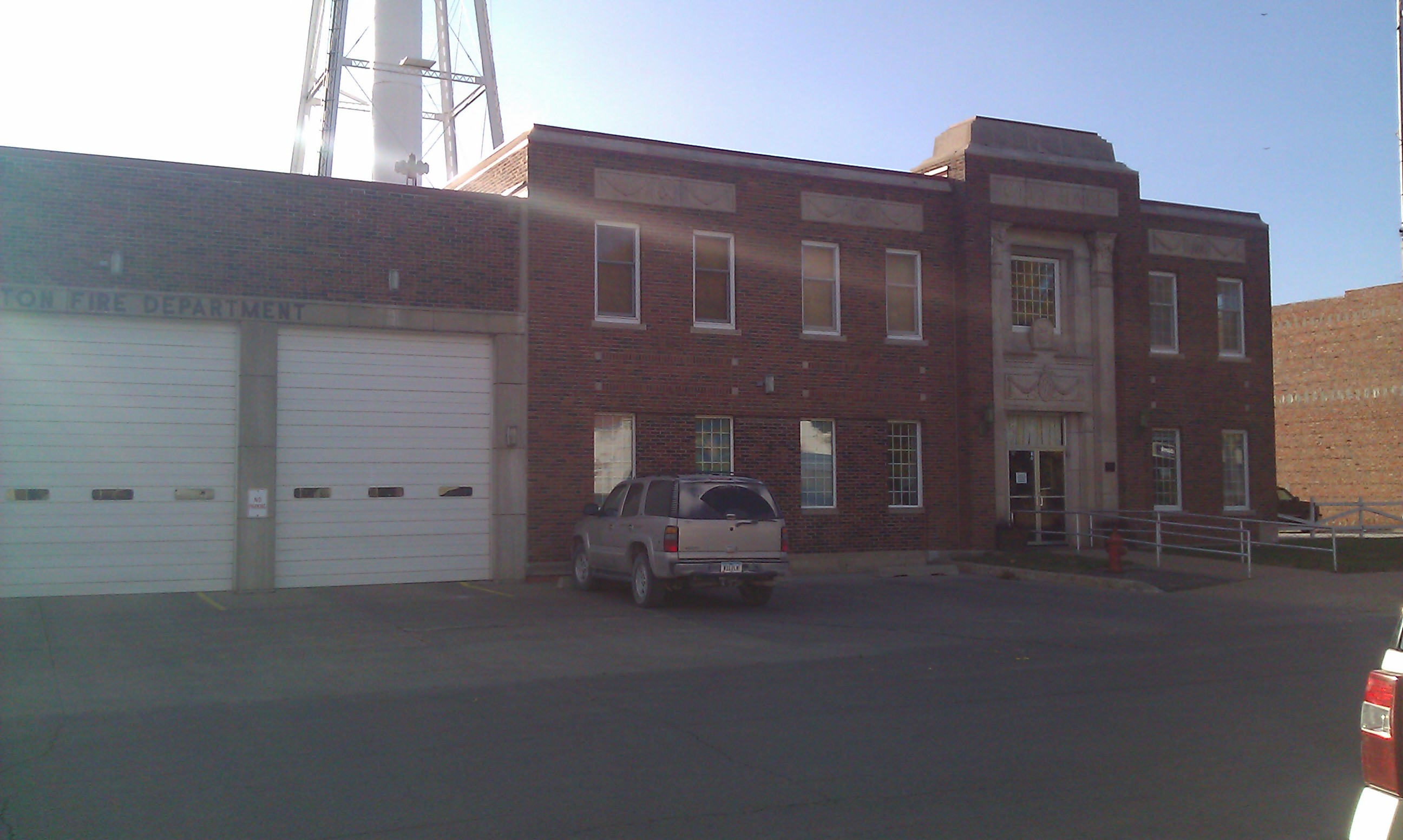

- Location within Iowa Location within the United States
- Location: 115 S. Main St. Chariton, Iowa
- Coordinates: 41°0′50″N 93°18′31″W
- Area: Less than one acre
- Built: 1931
- Built by: E.H. Best and Sons
- Architect: William L. Perkins
- Architectural style: Classical Revival
- Part of: Lucas County Courthouse Square Historic District (ID14000324)
- MPS: Architectural Career of William L. Perkins in Iowa:1917-1957 MPS
- NRHP reference No.: 06000775
- Added to NRHP: September 6, 2006

Chariton City Hall and Fire Station is located in Chariton, Iowa, United States. The combination building was designed by city engineer William L. Perkins, who had become known for designing residential and public buildings. The new facility came about because of the inadequate wood frame facilities they shared, and it was underscored by a fire that destroyed the center section of the south side of the town square in March 1930. While its dedication did not take place until March 1932, the city took possession of the completed facility in December 1931. An addition for the fire department was completed in 1979. While the asymmetrical facade and the recessed limestone surround of the main entrance reflects the Art Deco style that was popular at the time, the building's styling reflects the Neoclassical style. It is primarily found in the pilasters that flank the entrance, and the low relief emblems and festoons on the stone panels. The city hall\fire station was individually listed on the National Register of Historic Places in 2006. In 2014 it was included as a contributing property in the Lucas County Courthouse Square Historic District.
