= Burlington Railroad Overpass =

- U.S. National Register of Historic Places
- Location within Iowa Location within the United States
- Location: County Road S23 over the Burlington Northern railroad line
- Nearest city: Chariton, Iowa
- Coordinates: 41°02′27″N 93°21′57″W
- Built: 1937
- Built by: Ben Cole and Son
- Architect: Iowa State Highway Commission
- Architectural style: Deck arch bridge
- MPS: Highway Bridges of Iowa MPS
- NRHP reference No.: 98000511
- Added to NRHP: May 15, 1998

The Burlington Railroad Overpass is a historic structure northwest of Chariton, Iowa, United States. It spans the BNSF Railway tracks for 322 feet (98 m). The Iowa State Highway Commission (ISHC) designed several steel deck arch bridges in the 1930s to replace grade railroad crossings. The three-hinge arch is supported by concrete arch pedestals and was designed to cross the Chicago, Burlington and Quincy Railroad tracks. ISHC contracted with Ben Cole and Son of Ames, Iowa in 1936 to build the structure, which was completed a year later. The roadway has been widened, and guardrails have been replaced in subsequent years. It is the only example of this bridge type left in the state. It was listed on the National Register of Historic Places in 1998.
