= Theodore Heck =

American Roman Catholic cleric

Fr. Theodore Heck, OSB (born Henry John Heck in Chariton, Iowa on January 16, 1901; died 29 April 2009) was a Benedictine serving at St. Meinrad Archabbey from 1922 onward. He was ordained to the priesthood on May 21, 1929. He helped found the American Benedictine Academy and served as its President from 1947 to 1957. He played an important role in improving education among the monks and remained active after he turned 100. At his death he was believed to be the longest lived Benedictine in the world.
