= Chariton Herald-Patriot Building =

Historic building in Iowa, United States

- U.S. National Register of Historic Places
- U.S. Historic district – Contributing property
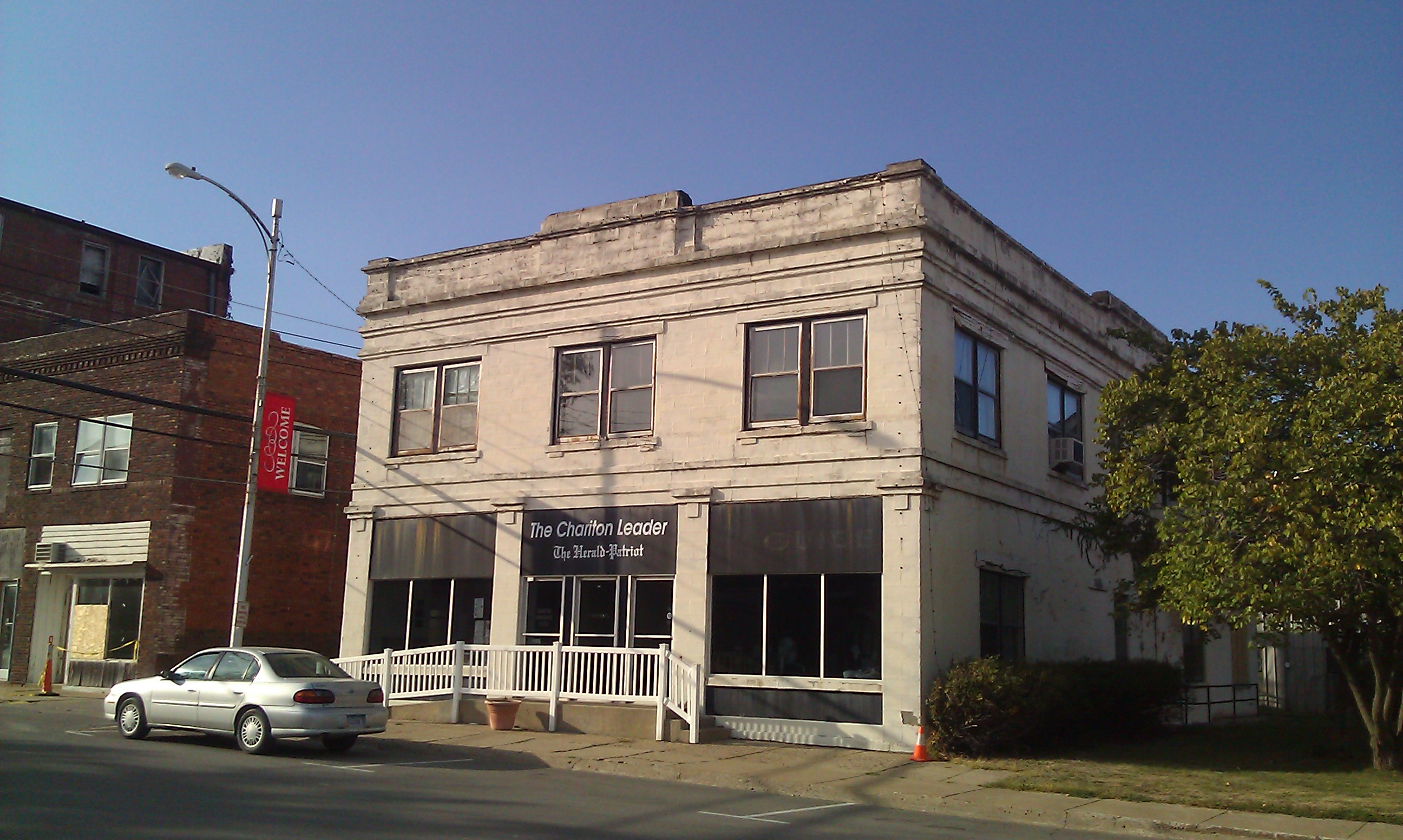

- Location within Iowa Location within the United States
- Location: 815 Braden Ave. Chariton, Iowa
- Coordinates: 41°0′57″N 93°18′22″W
- Area: Less than one acre
- Built: 1918
- Built by: P.E. Johnson
- Architect: William L. Perkins
- Architectural style: Classical Revival; American Craftsman
- Part of: Lucas County Courthouse Square Historic District (ID14000324)
- MPS: Architectural Career of William L. Perkins in Iowa:1917-1957 MPS
- NRHP reference No.: 06000776
- Added to NRHP: September 6, 2006

The Chariton Herald-Patriot Building is located in Chariton, Iowa, United States. This is the earliest known building designed by Local architect William L. Perkins, who had arrived in town the year before the building was completed in 1918. The two-story hydro-stone block structure features a three bay, symmetrical facade, a simple classical cornice, and simple pilasters on the first floor with plain capitals that divide the bays. The significance of the hydro-stone, which is a type of concrete block, is its use as a then new building material. The building was individually listed on the National Register of Historic Places in 2006. In 2014 it was included as a contributing property in the Lucas County Courthouse Square Historic District.
