= Chariton freight station =

Historic building in Iowa, United States

- Chicago, Burlington, and Quincy Freight House-Chariton
- U.S. National Register of Historic Places
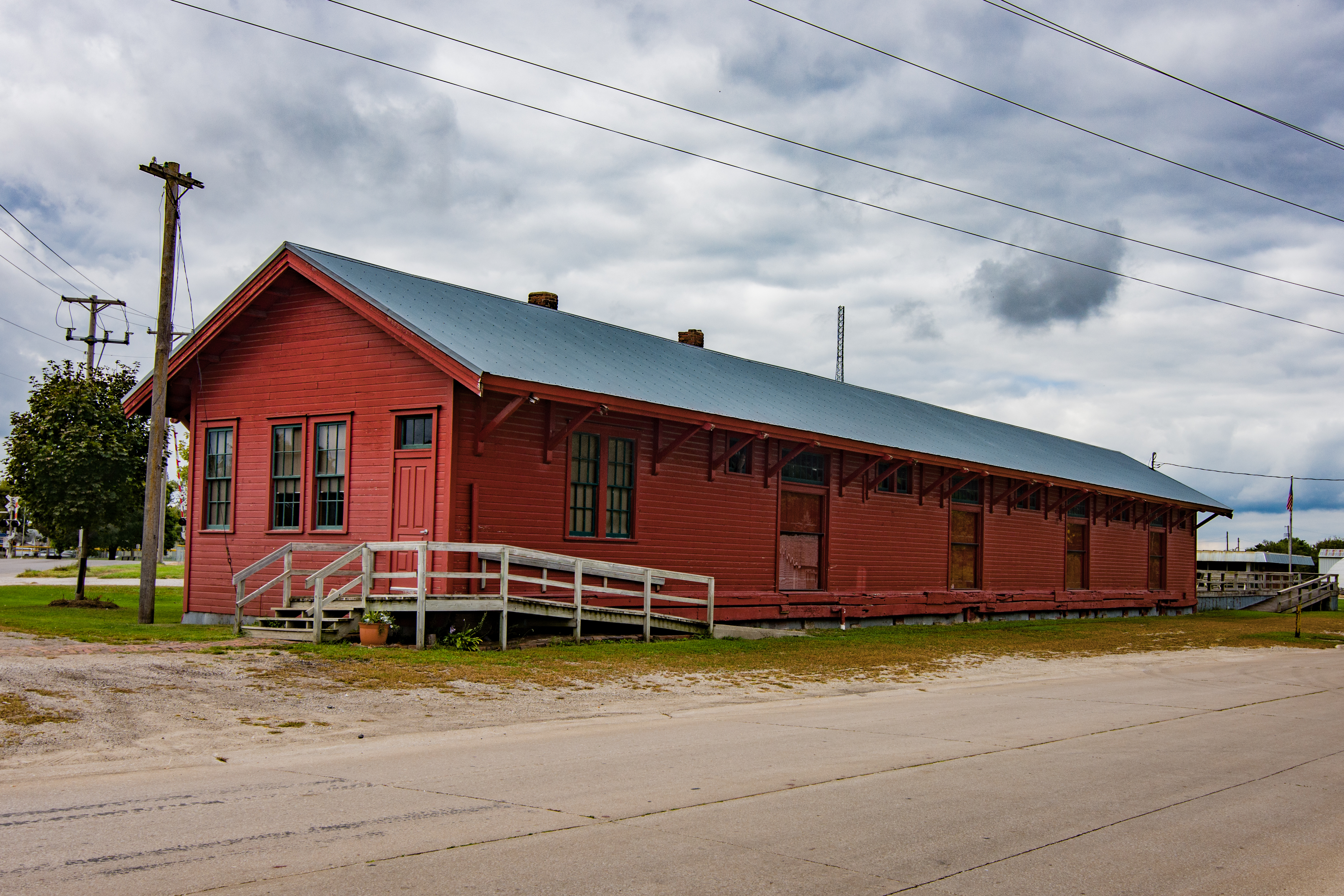

- Location within Iowa Location within the United States
- Location: NW Junction of Auburn and Brookdale, Chariton, Iowa
- Coordinates: 41°1′6.59″N 93°18′31.14″W
- Area: 3700 ft²
- Built: 1904
- NRHP reference No.: 03000836
- Added to NRHP: 28 August 2003

Chariton freight station is an historic building located in Chariton, Iowa, United States. Chariton was a wholesale and distribution center for southern Iowa when the Chicago, Burlington, and Quincy Railroad built the freight house in 1904. It reflected the town's importance as a division point for the railroad. The structure contains 3,700 square feet (340 m^{2}) of interior space. The depot was listed on the National Register of Historic Places in 2003 as the Chicago, Burlington, and Quincy Freight House-Chariton.

== Photo gallery ==
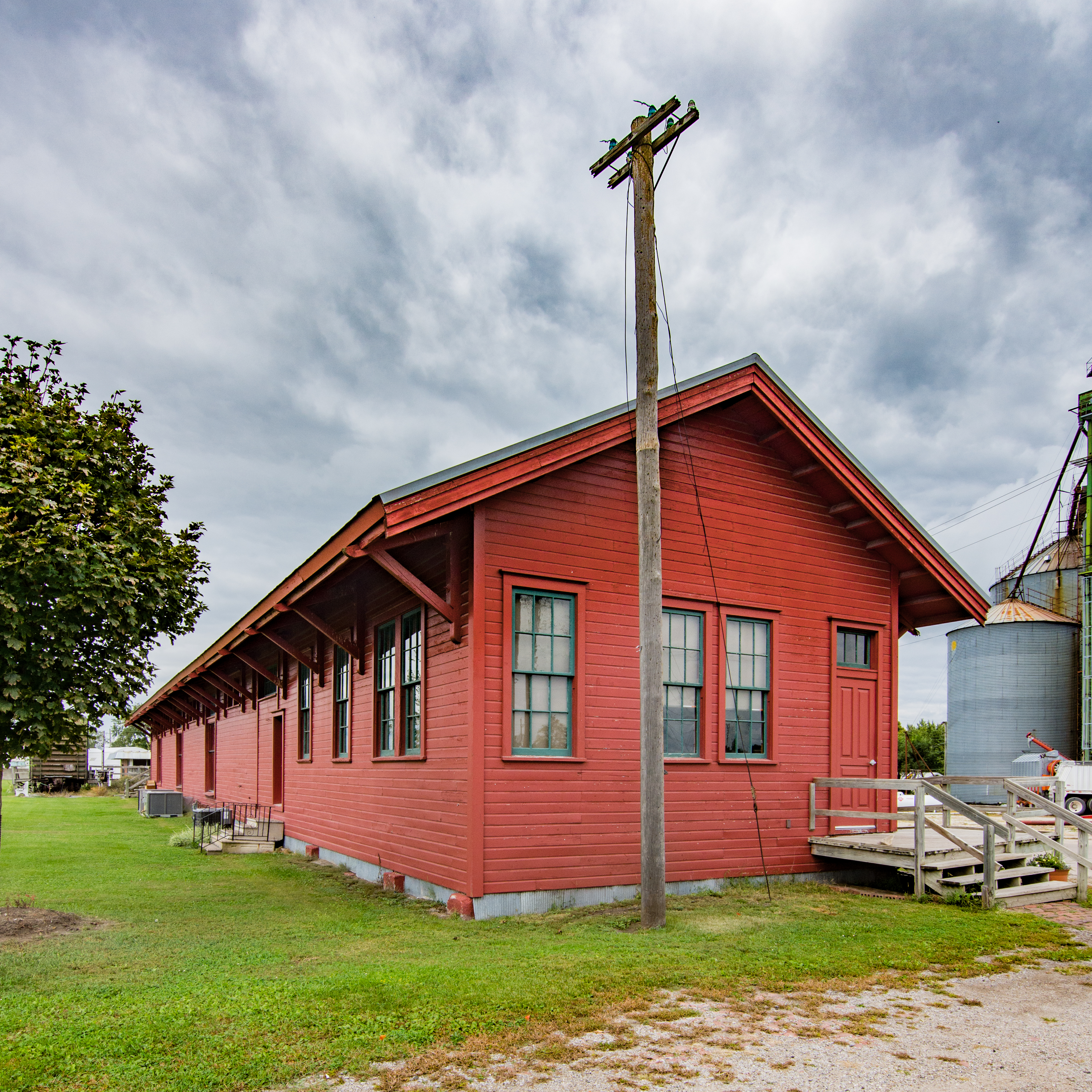

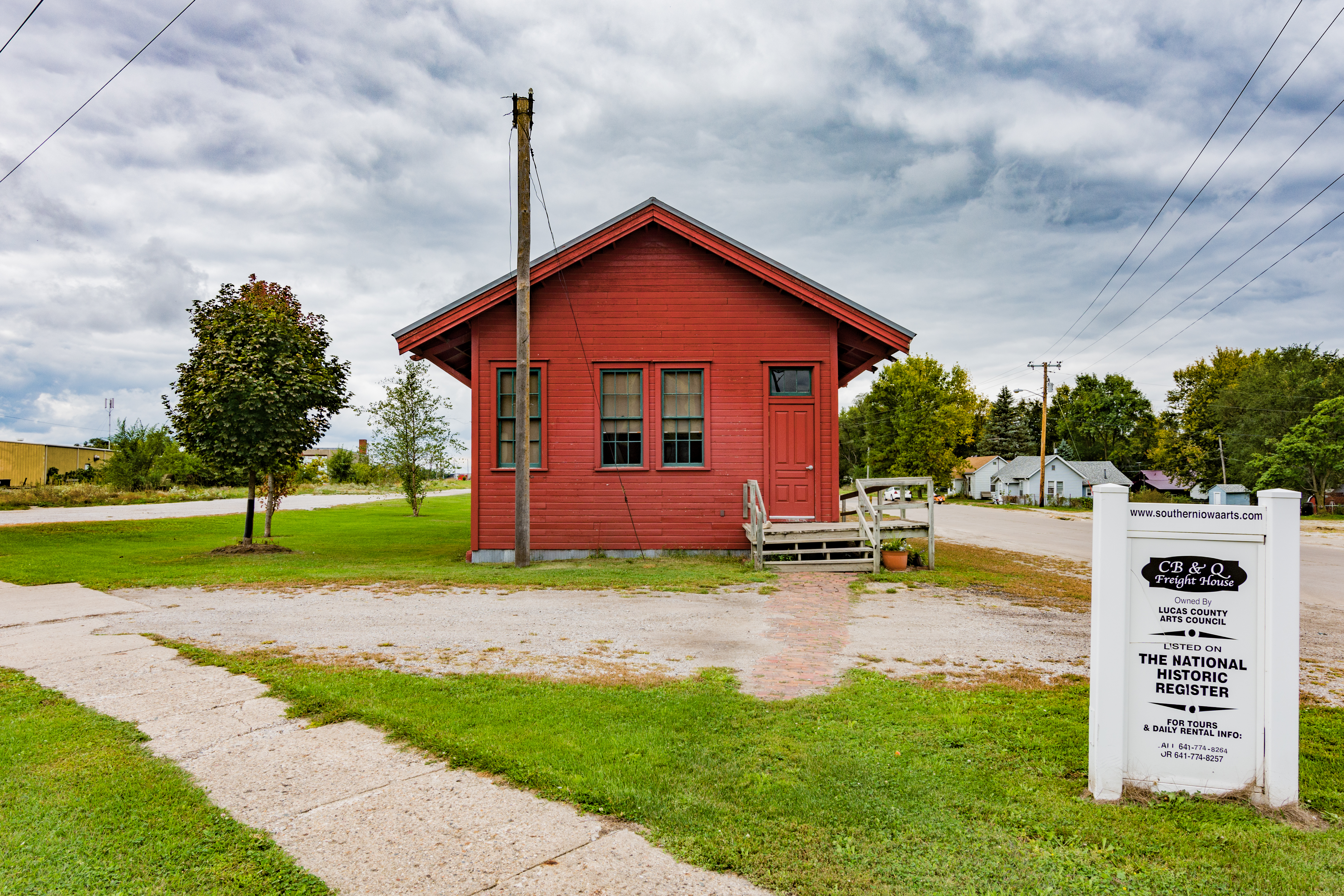

Preceding station	Burlington Route	Following station
Indianola toward Denver	Main Line	Albia toward Chicago
