= Chariton Masonic Temple =

Historic building in Iowa, United States

- U.S. National Register of Historic Places
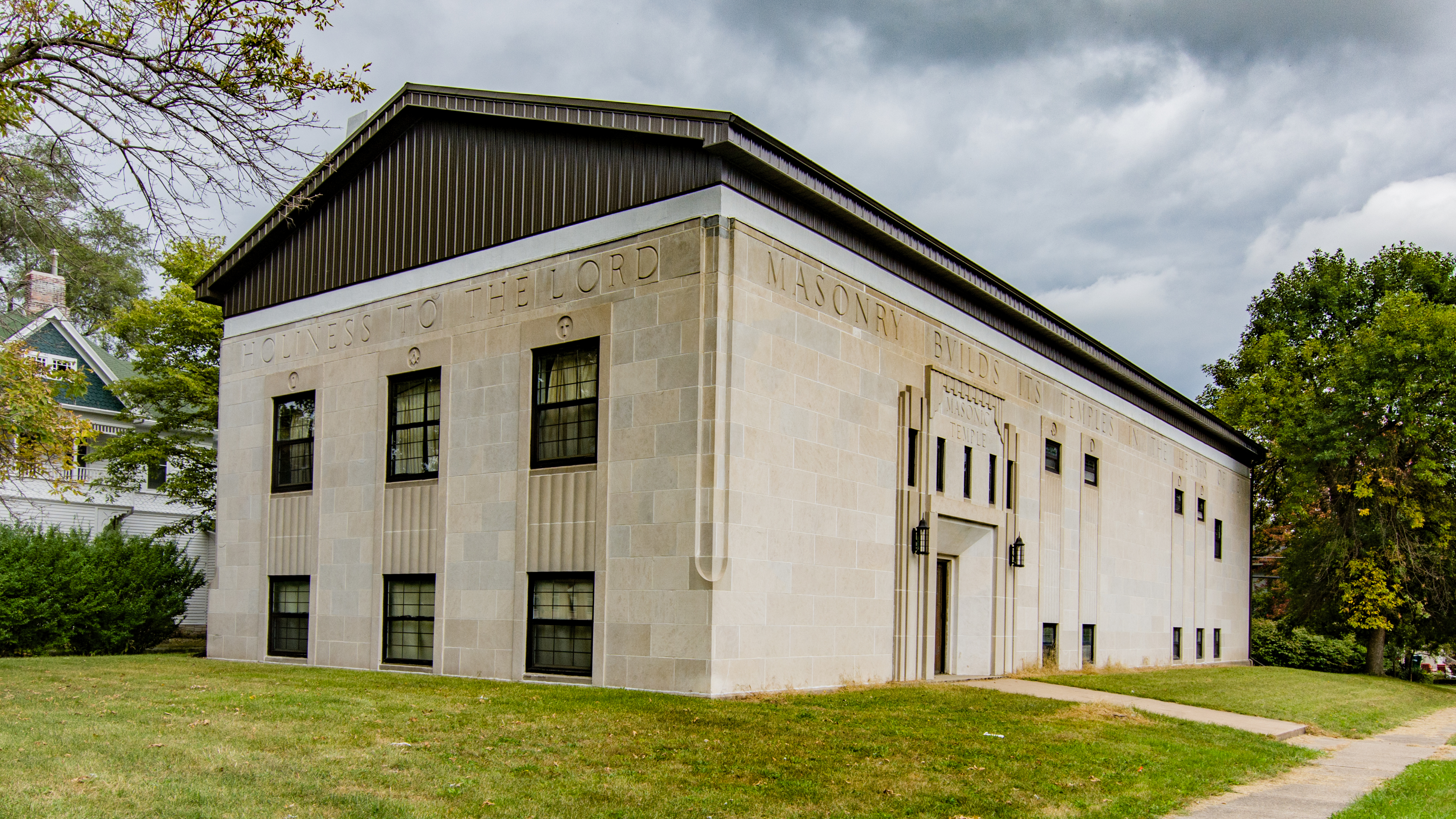

- Location within Iowa Location within the United States
- Location: 821 Armory Ave. Chariton, Iowa
- Coordinates: 41°0′51″N 93°18′24″W
- Area: less than one acre
- Built: 1937
- Architect: Perkins, William L.; Best, E.H. and Sons
- Architectural style: Art Deco, Masonic Temple
- MPS: Architectural Career of William L. Perkins in Iowa:1917-1957 MPS
- NRHP reference No.: 06000777
- Added to NRHP: September 06, 2006

The Chariton Masonic Temple in Chariton, Iowa, is an Art Deco–style building from 1937 designed by William L. Perkins.

It was listed on the National Register of Historic Places in 2006. It was deemed significant as the last major Chariton work by William L. Perkins, and "as a fine example of Art Deco design executed in stone and brick."

== Photo gallery ==
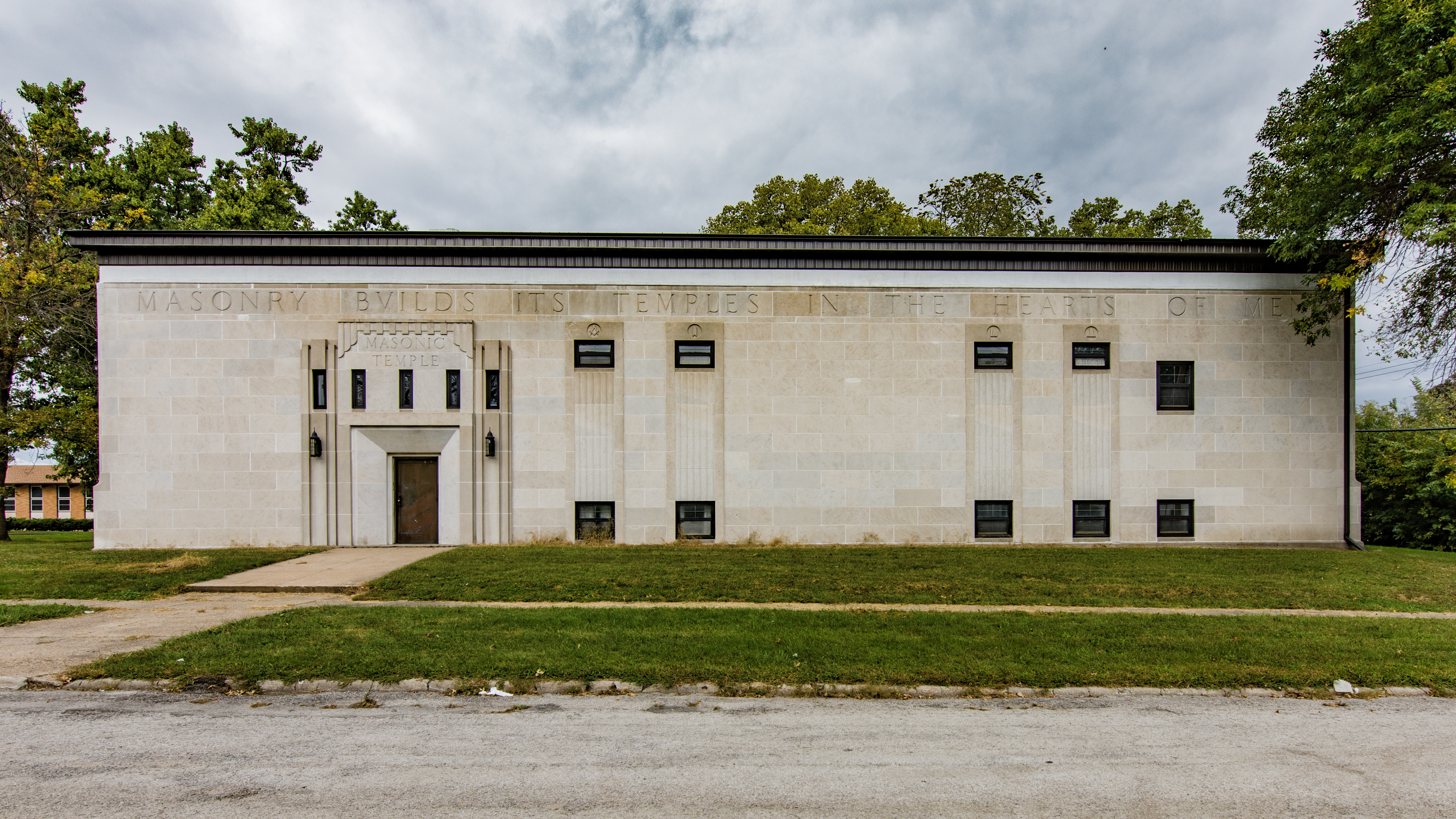

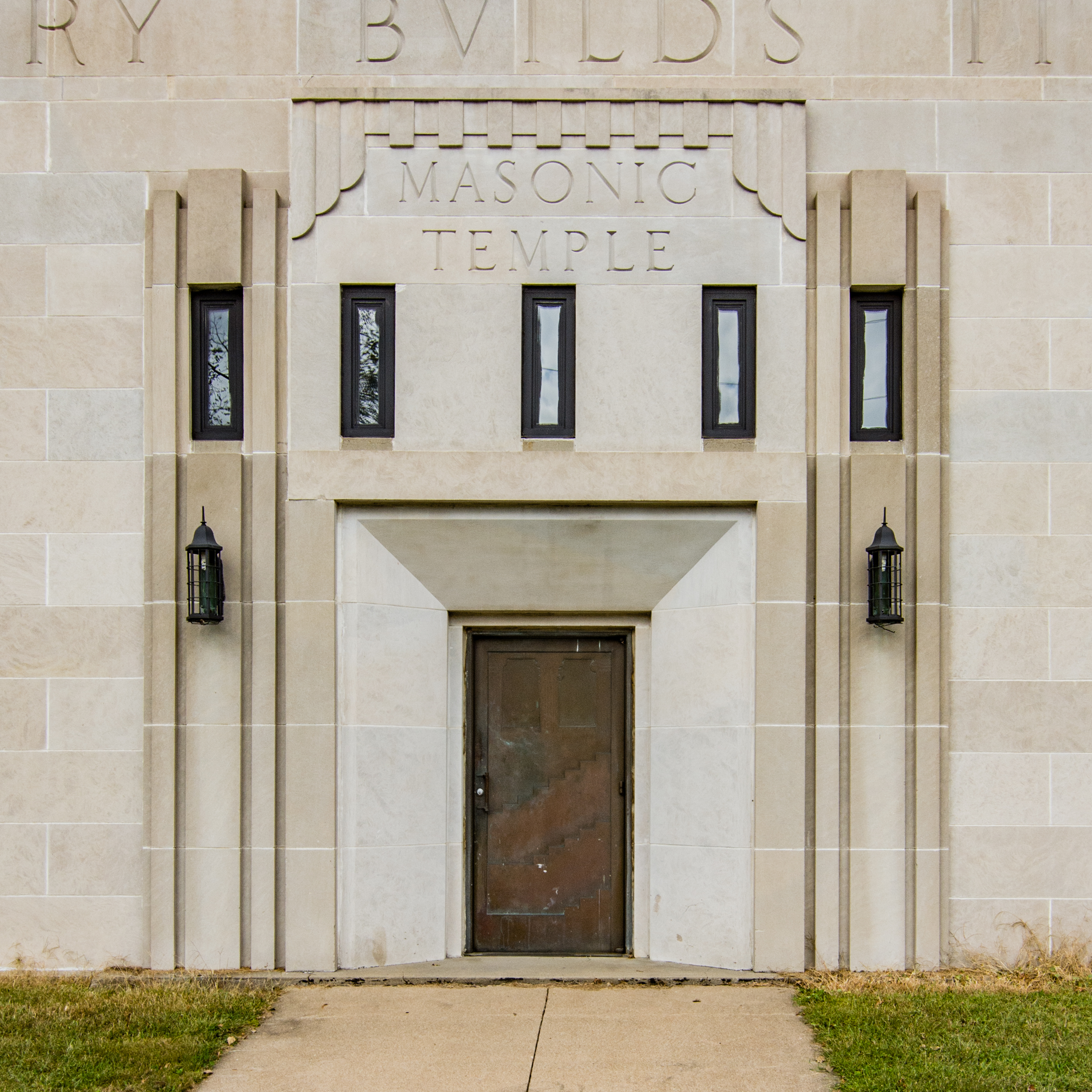
