= William L. Perkins =

American architect

William L. Perkins (died 1957) was an American architect of Chariton, Iowa. His career is documented in a National Park Service study, "Architectural Career of William L. Perkins in Iowa:1917-1957 MPS".

Among his works are:

- Carl L. Caviness Post 102, American Legion, 201 S. Main St., Chariton, Iowa, NRHP-listed
- Chariton City Hall and Fire Station, 115 S. Main St., Chariton, Iowa, NRHP-listed
- Chariton Herald-Patriot Building, 815 Braden Ave., Chariton, Iowa, NRHP-listed
- Chariton Masonic Temple, 821 Armory Ave., Chariton, Iowa, NRHP-listed
- Hotel Charitone, 831 Braden Ave., Chariton, Iowa, NRHP-listed
- Williamson School, 301 Williamson Ave., Williamson, Iowa, NRHP-listed
