= Military history of Vermont =

Military history of the American state of Vermont

The military history of Vermont covers the military history of the American state of Vermont, as part of French colonial America; as part of Massachusetts, New Hampshire and New York during the British colonial period and during the French and Indian Wars; as the independent New Connecticut and later Vermont during the American Revolution; and as a state during the War of 1812 and the American Civil War.

In 1666, Fort Sainte Anne was established as the first permanent European settlement, by the French, at Isle La Motte, Vermont. This was done to protect Canada from the Iroquois.

== Pre-revolutionary battles ==
At the time of the arrival of Europeans early in the 17th century, the territory of Vermont was home to the Abenaki peoples and was frequently raided by the Iroquois and their allies. These Indian nations regularly fought each other in this area. Zadock Thompson wrote "several powerful tribes who were incessantly at war with each other, it became the bloody theatre of their battles." Then, when the English and French occupied North America, the area became a battleground between these colonial powers and their Indian allies. In King William's War and Queen Anne's War raiding parties crossed the territory to attack targets in New England and New France. These notably included the 1704 Raid on Deerfield, Massachusetts, and the 1708 Raid on Haverhill, Massachusetts, both conducted by combined French and Indian forces departing from the Saint Lawrence River valley.

=== Father Rale's War ===
Father Rale's War (1722–1725) (the Fourth Indian War) took place in present-day Maine, New Hampshire, Vermont, New Brunswick, and Nova Scotia. Fort Dummer was established in Vermont.

== American Revolution ==
=== Battle of Valcour Island ===
Considered the first naval battle of the Revolutionary War, was fought on Lake Champlain with the American side being commanded by Benedict Arnold.

=== Battle of Hubbardton ===
The Battle of Hubbardton was fought on 7 July 1777, near Hubbardton, Vermont. An engagement between General Simon Fraser of Great Britain and American forces retreating following the Siege Fort Ticonderoga, it was the only battle properly fought on the soil of what would become the state of Vermont. The battle was a victory for the British, due to the arrival of Hessian forces under the command of General Friedrich Adolf Riedesel; however the cost of the victory was sufficient to discourage pursuit of the retreating American forces.

=== Battle of Bennington ===
The Battle of Bennington was fought 16 August 1777 in what is now Walloomsac, New York. The territory at the time disputed between New York and Vermont, was fought over supplies and troops based in Bennington. Brigadier General John Stark's brigade of New Hampshire militia was based at Bennington, Vermont.

The battle is commemorated by the Bennington Battle Monument, located in Bennington, Vermont; the monument is the tallest man-made structure in the state of Vermont.

=== Royalton Raid ===
In October 1780 British commanders led an Indian raid against various towns along the White River Valley.

== War of 1812 ==
Although Vermont was not the scene of any major battles during the War of 1812, its position as a border state with British North America, and the demands by the federal government for the recruitment of troops dictated the state's involvement in the war. Several regiments of U. S. Army troops were raised, as were militia companies for the defense of the state's northern border areas. Vermont troops served primarily in the military campaigns in northern New York.

== American Civil War ==
=== St. Albans Raid ===
- St. Albans Raid was the northernmost land action of the American Civil War, taking place in St. Albans, Vermont on 19 October 1864.
