= St. Albans Raid =

Raid during the American Civil War

- Part of the American Civil War
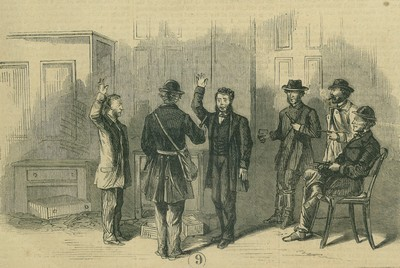
- St. Albans bank tellers being forced to pledge allegiance to the Confederacy, Unknown author
Date	October 19, 1864
Location	St. Albans, Vermont 44°48′37″N 73°09′08″W
Result	Confederate victory

Belligerents
Confederate States	United States

Commanders and leaders
Bennett H. Young	George P. Conger

Strength
21	Local police officers 1 Vermont militia officer, several civilians

Casualties and losses
1 wounded	1 killed 2 wounded

The St. Albans Raid was the northernmost land action of the American Civil War. Taking place in St. Albans, Vermont, on October 19, 1864, it was a raid conducted out of the Province of Canada by 21 Confederate soldiers who had recently failed in engagements with the Union Army and evaded subsequent capture in the United States. The mission of the raid was to rob banks to raise money, and to trick the Union Army into diverting troops to defend their northern border against further raids. The Confederates obtained the money, killed a local, set the town on fire, and escaped back to Canada. This raid marked the northernmost point reached by Confederate land forces during the Civil War.

== Background ==
Kentuckian Bennett H. Young led the Confederate forces in the raid. Young had been captured after the Battle of Salineville in Ohio ended Morgan's Raid the year before. He managed to escape to Canada, which had not yet federated with the Maritime provinces. After meeting with Confederate agents there, he returned to the Confederacy, where he proposed raids on the Union from the Canada–US border to build the Confederate treasury and force the Union Army to divert troops from the South. Young was commissioned as a lieutenant and returned to Canada, where he recruited other escaped Confederates for a raid on St. Albans, Vermont, a quiet city just 15 miles (24 km) from the border.

== Lead-up and planning ==
The first two raiders arrived in Philipsburg, Canada East, on the morning of October 11, where they stayed at the Lafayette Hotel. More people joined them at the hotel throughout the day; the city served as an ideal starting point because it was within 1 mile (1.6 km) of the Canada–United States border. Young was planning for a series of raids beginning with St. Albans, which was chosen first because it was close to the border and well-connected by roads, railways, and waterways. It also had three banks in close proximity and was a "prosperous market town". Young was the first of the raiders to arrive at St. Albans, on October 12. Upon arrival he began to inspect the city, particularly the three banks.

The twenty-two young raiders planned to rob three banks—the First National, St. Albans, and Franklin County Banks—and then set fire to the town using incendiaries. They reached the town in pairs after Young, posing as part of a hunting and fishing club. Young was forced to postpone the raid, initially set for October 18, because the town would be too busy, instead settling on the next day, a Wednesday, as it would be "the dullest [day] of the week."

== Raid ==
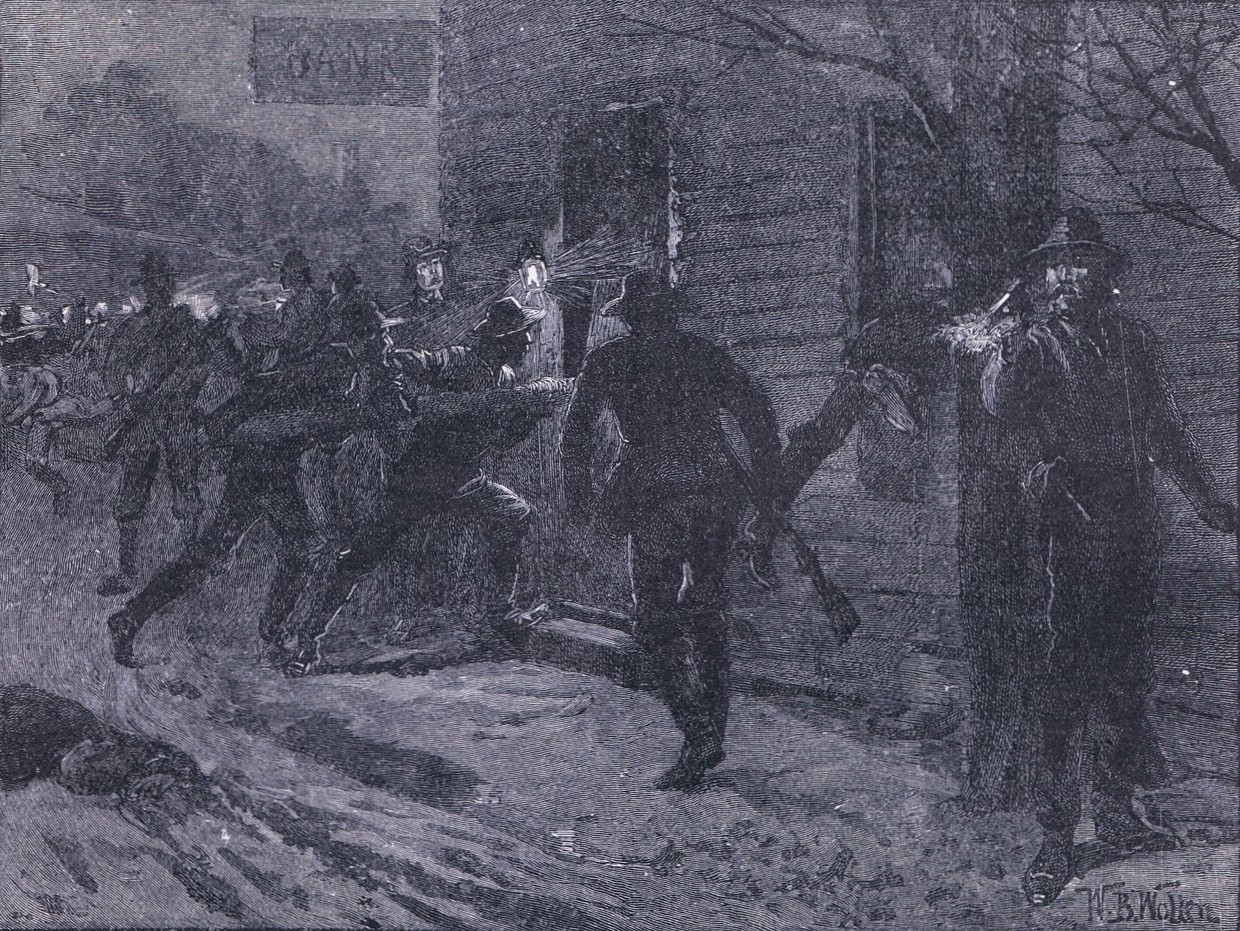
William Barnes Wollen, Confederate raid into Vermont

The engagement began on Wednesday afternoon as Young set a gun off. Most townspeople "believed it was a joke or a prank", but one of the raiders soon announced "we are Confederate soldiers and you are my prisoners." They robbed the St. Albans Bank first. They took cash from several people who came in to make deposits as well as cash in the bank, but left uncut bank notes and coins behind. The prisoners were forced to swear allegiance to the Confederate States of America before being locked in the bank. After twelve minutes, the robbers moved on.

Nine raiders were delegated to take the town as the robberies were ongoing, moving inhabitants onto the village green. Soon, resistance emerged in the form of Captain George Conger, a member of the 1st Vermont Infantry Regiment on leave, who began alerting the rest of the town and raised a group to fight back. In the face of resistance, Young and his group retreated, attempting to light fires in the town as they went. Elinus J. Morrison was shot, dying two days later from his wounds, while Collins H. Huntington was wounded, both civilians. A raider, Charles Higby, was wounded by gunfire as armed citizenry arrived on the scene, but escaped with the rest of the Confederates. They reached Canada around 9:00 p.m. after crossing the Missisquoi River. While they planned to return to Montreal, the Canadian police captured or otherwise held thirteen of the men. Young soon resolved to give himself up.

He boarded at a house near Philipsburg. The home's owner alerted Conger, who had pursued the raiders into Canada. Conger's group took Young prisoner. He attempted to escape, but was recaptured quickly by the mob, who began attacking him. The fight was broken up by a British officer who saw that Conger's entourage returned to Vermont and that Young and seven other captured raiders were soon brought to Saint-Jean-sur-Richelieu, where "they were treated as heroes".

The raiders escaped to Canada, despite a delayed pursuit. In response to American demands, the Canadian authorities arrested the raiders, recovering US$88,000 (equivalent to $1,811,489 in 2025). However, a Canadian court ruled that because they were soldiers acting under military orders, an officially neutral Canada could not extradite them. Their defense was partly led by future Canadian Prime Minister John Abbott. Canada freed the raiders but returned the recovered money to St. Albans.

== Aftermath ==
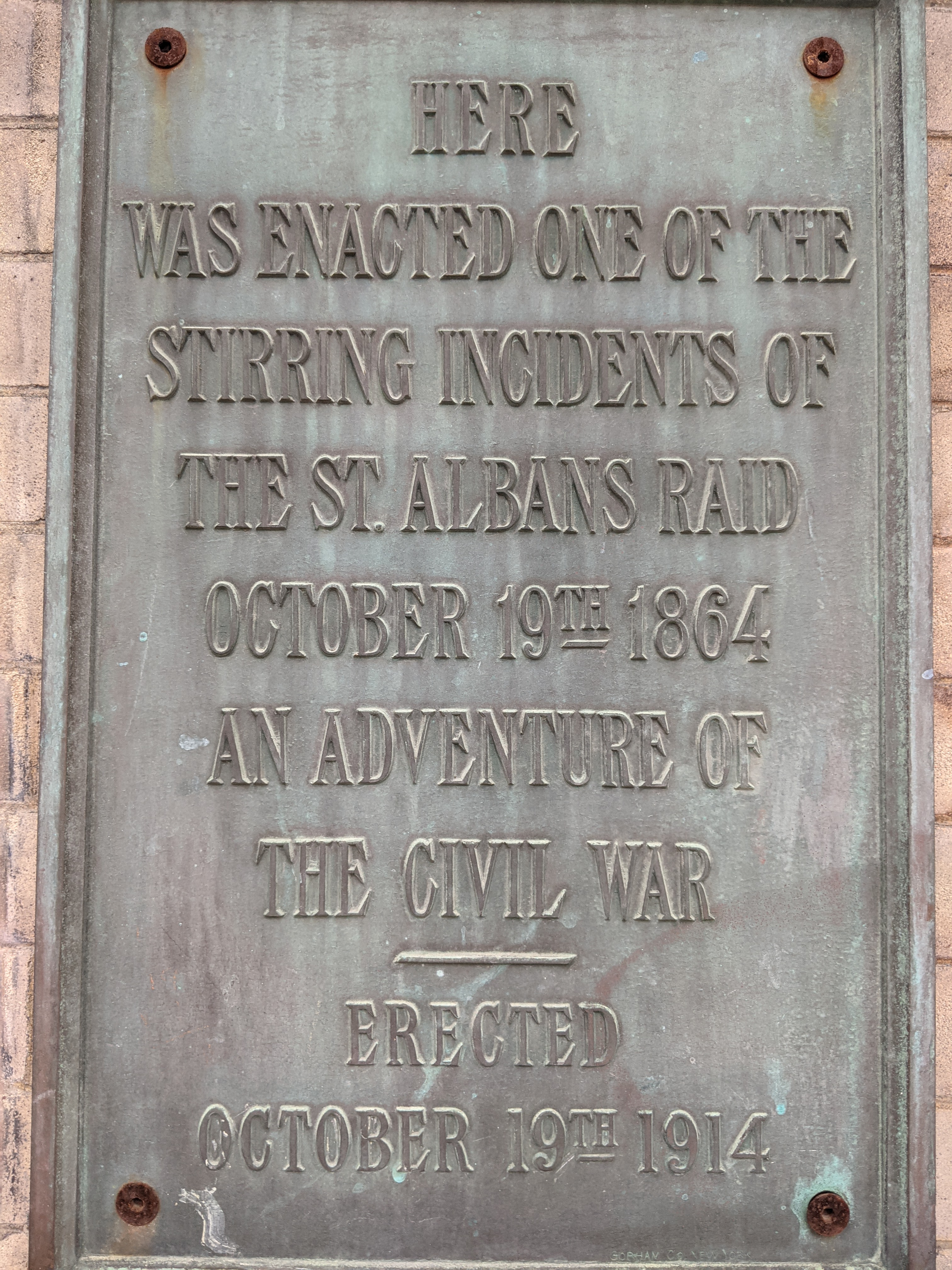
Plaque in St. Albans memorializing the St. Albans Raid

The release of the raiders angered Americans. As U.S. Secretary of State William H. Seward informed his counterparts in London, "it is impossible to consider those proceedings as either legal, just or friendly towards the United States." In Europe, news of the raid and subsequent speculation of war between Britain and the U.S. raised the price of Confederate gold bonds.

As an unintended consequence, the raid turned many Canadians against the Confederacy since they felt that Canada was being drawn into the conflict without its consent. The Confederate agents in Canada realized that, and so no further raids were made.

None of the three banks still exist. Surviving sites are Taylor Park and the American House, where some of the raiders stayed.

== In popular culture ==
The 1954 film The Raid was loosely based on this incident.

== See also ==
- Canada in the American Civil War
- Military history of Vermont
- Ann Eliza Smith
