= Lucas County Courthouse Square Historic District =

Historic district in Iowa, United States

- U.S. National Register of Historic Places
- U.S. Historic district
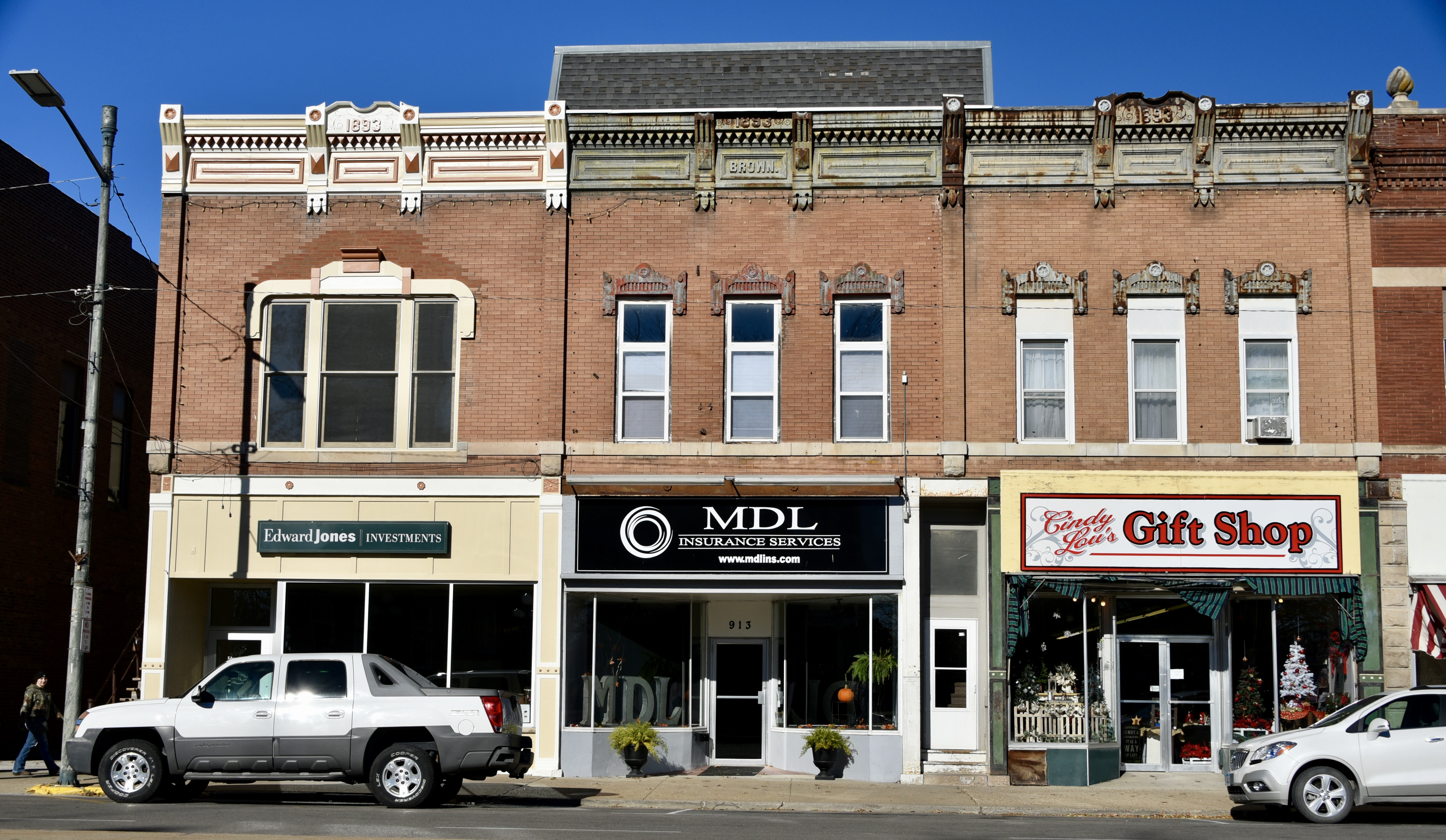

- Location within Iowa Location within the United States
- Location: Braden and Court avenues and Grand and Main streets around the public square, Chariton, Iowa
- Coordinates: 41°0′54″N 93°18′27.4″W
- Area: 21.2 acres (8.6 ha)
- Architect: William Foster & Henry Liebbe
- Architectural style: Italianate; Classical Revival
- NRHP reference No.: 14000324
- Added to NRHP: August 11, 2014

Lucas County Courthouse Square Historic District is a nationally recognized historic district located in Chariton, Iowa, United States. It was listed on the National Register of Historic Places in 2014. At the time of its nomination the district consisted of 76 resources, including 56 contributing buildings, one contributing site, one contributing structure, three contributing objects, 14 noncontributing buildings, one noncontributing structure, and one noncontributing object. The historic district covers the city's central business district in the original town plat. The buildings were either built or remodeled between 1867 and 1963, and range from one to three stories in height. They all have brick exteriors. Of the older buildings, the commercial Italianate style is dominant.

While the vast majority of the buildings are commercial buildings, there are five public buildings in the district: the Lucas County Courthouse (1893), Chariton Free Public Library (1904), the former Lucas County Sheriffs Residence and Jail (1916), the U.S. Post Office (1918), and Chariton City Hall and Fire Station (1931). Three fraternal buildings are included in the district: the Knights of Pythias Hall (1894), the IOOF Building (1904), and the American Legion (1925). Two commercial buildings that are individually listed on the National Register include the Chariton Herald-Patriot Building (1918), Hotel Charitone (1923).
