= Williamson, Iowa =

- City
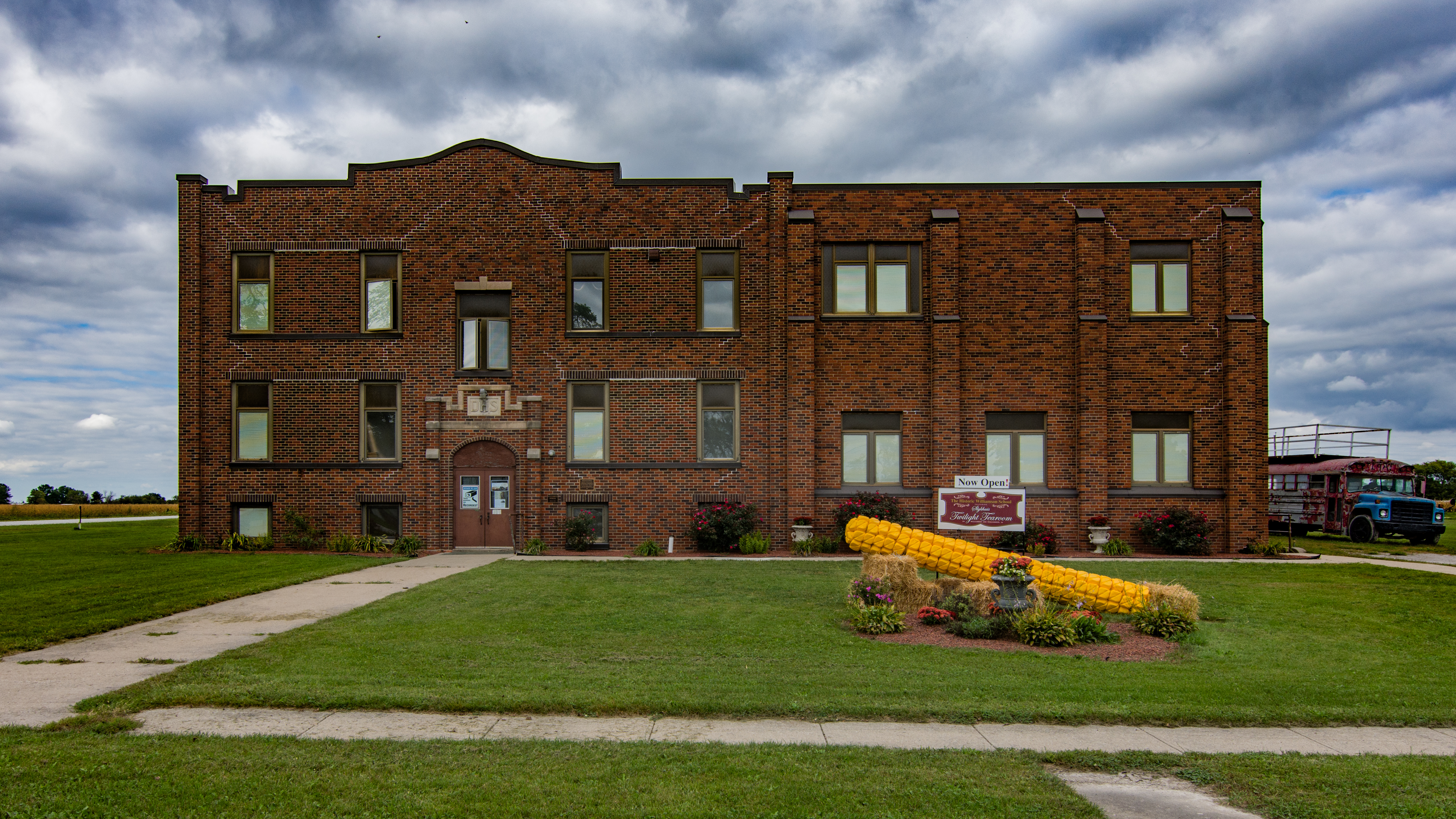
- The former Williamson School

- Location of Williamson, Iowa
- Coordinates: 41°05′18″N 93°15′25″W
- Country: USA
- State: Iowa
- County: Lucas

Area
  - Total: 0.38 sq mi (0.99 km^{2})
  - Land: 0.38 sq mi (0.99 km^{2})
  - Water: 0 sq mi (0.00 km^{2})
- Elevation: 1,024 ft (312 m)

Population (2020)
  - Total: 120
  - Density: 314.7/sq mi (121.49/km^{2})
- Time zone: UTC-6 (Central (CST))
  - Summer (DST): UTC-5 (CDT)
- ZIP code: 50272
- Area code: 641
- FIPS code: 19-85935
- GNIS feature ID: 2397320

Williamson is a city in Lucas County, Iowa, United States. The population was 120 at the time of the 2020 census.

== History ==
Williamson is named for its founder, George E. Williamson.

== Geography ==
According to the United States Census Bureau, the city has a total area of 0.32 square miles (0.83 km^{2}), all land.

== Demographics ==
Historical populations
Year	Pop.	±%
1930	814	—
1940	616	−24.3%
1950	294	−52.3%
1960	262	−10.9%
1970	216	−17.6%
1980	210	−2.8%
1990	166	−21.0%
2000	163	−1.8%
2010	152	−6.7%
2020	120	−21.1%
Source:"U.S. Census website". United States Census Bureau. and Iowa Data Center; Source: U.S. Decennial Census

=== 2020 census ===
As of the 2020 Census, the total population was 120 people. The population density was 375 people per square mile, spread over 0.32 miles. Of those 120 people, the median age was 29.5 years old, with 41.8% of the town's population under the age of 18, 52.8% between the ages of 18 and 64, and 5.4% of the population over the age of 65. There were a total of 57 households, with an average of 4.67 people per household.

51% of the town's population was male, with the remaining 49% of the population female. The racial makeup of the town was 96.6% White, 2.5% Hispanic, and the remaining 0.9% identified as other.

61.9% of the population of the town is identified as currently married.

90.4% of the Williamson population has received a high school degree, which is 2.2 percentage points lower than the rest of the state. Williamson has a lower-than-average percentage of the population having received college degrees, with only 1% of the town's population having received a bachelor's degree compared to the state average of 30.5%.

6.5% of the town's population were veterans.

=== 2010 census ===
As of the census of 2010, there were 152 people, 63 households, and 40 families living in the city. The population density was 475.0 inhabitants per square mile (183.4/km^{2}). There were 82 housing units at an average density of 256.3 per square mile (99.0/km^{2}). The racial makeup of the city was 96.1% White, 0.7% African American, and 3.3% from other races. Hispanic or Latino of any race were 4.6% of the population.

There were 63 households, of which 28.6% had children under the age of 18 living with them, 34.9% were married couples living together, 14.3% had a female householder with no husband present, 14.3% had a male householder with no wife present, and 36.5% were non-families. 25.4% of all households were made up of individuals, and 11.1% had someone living alone who was 65 years of age or older. The average household size was 2.41 and the average family size was 2.85.

The median age in the city was 40 years. 25% of residents were under the age of 18; 7.3% were between the ages of 18 and 24; 20.4% were from 25 to 44; 30.2% were from 45 to 64; and 17.1% were 65 years of age or older. The gender makeup of the city was 55.9% male and 44.1% female.

=== 2000 census ===
As of the census of 2000, there were 163 people, 71 households, and 46 families living in the city. The population density was 510.3 inhabitants per square mile (197.0/km^{2}). There were 84 housing units at an average density of 263.0 per square mile (101.5/km^{2}). The racial makeup of the city was 100.00% White.

There were 71 households, out of which 25.4% had children under the age of 18 living with them, 43.7% were married couples living together, 8.5% had a female householder with no husband present, and 35.2% were non-families. 31.0% of all households were made up of individuals, and 14.1% had someone living alone who was 65 years of age or older. The average household size was 2.30 and the average family size was 2.76.

In the city, the population was spread out, with 23.3% under the age of 18, 7.4% from 18 to 24, 27.0% from 25 to 44, 25.2% from 45 to 64, and 17.2% who were 65 years of age or older. The median age was 39 years. For every 100 females, there were 132.9 males. For every 100 females age 18 and over, there were 115.5 males.

The median income for a household in the city was $20,000, and the median income for a family was $25,833. Males had a median income of $23,750 versus $22,083 for females. The per capita income for the city was $10,456. About 28.6% of families and 26.2% of the population were below the poverty line, including 40.0% of those under the age of eighteen and 18.8% of those 65 or over.

== Education ==
Chariton Community School District serves the community. The district operates Chariton High School.
