= Lucas County Courthouse (Iowa) =

- U.S. National Register of Historic Places
- U.S. Historic district – Contributing property
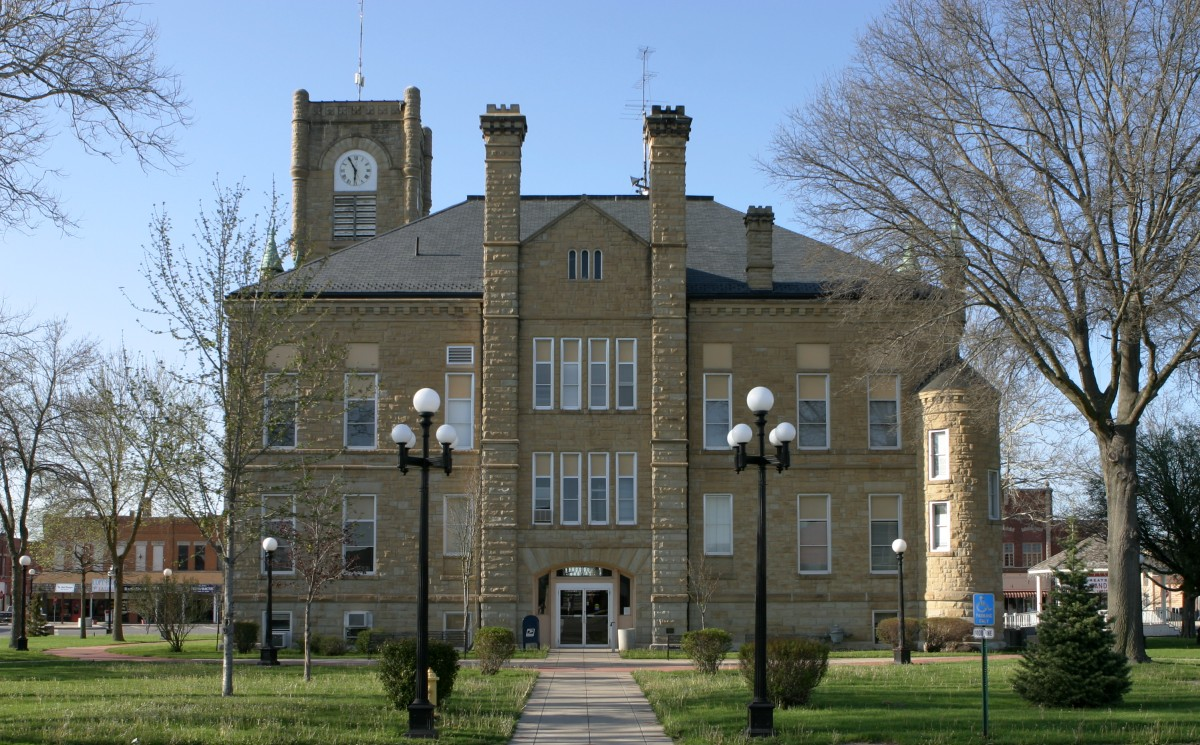

- Location within Iowa Location within the United States
- Location: Courthouse Square; Chariton, Iowa
- Coordinates: 41°0′55″N 93°18′25″W
- Area: less than one acre
- Built: 1893
- Built by: G.J. Stewart & Co
- Architect: Foster & Liebbe
- Architectural style: Romanesque Revival
- Part of: Lucas County Courthouse Square Historic District (ID14000324)
- MPS: County Courthouses in Iowa TR
- NRHP reference No.: 81000254
- Added to NRHP: July 2, 1981

The Lucas County Courthouse located in Chariton, Iowa, United States, was built in 1893. It was listed on the National Register of Historic Places in 1981 as a part of the County Courthouses in Iowa Thematic Resource. In 2014 it was included as a contributing property in the Lucas County Courthouse Square Historic District. The courthouse is the third building the county has used for court functions and county administration.

== History ==
Lucas County's first courthouse was constructed of oak logs in 1850. The 1½-story building was built for $374, and paid for from the Chariton town lot fund. It measured 22 by 18 feet (6.7 by 5.5 m) and lime and sand filled the space between the logs. The second courthouse was a 50-square-foot (4.6 m^{2}) building that cost between $15,000 and $20,000 to build. Its foundation was made of logs. After ten years multiple cracks appeared in the logs and Judge Guard ordered the sheriff to secure a church for court proceedings. As the building did not collapse, court returned to the courthouse for several more years. The present courthouse was approved by county voters in 1885. It was completed in 1894, and the clock in the tower has been in operation since then.

== Architecture ==
The courthouse was built of rusticated sandstone in the Richardsonian Romanesque style. It was designed by the Des Moines architectural firm of Foster & Liebbe, and built by G.J. Stewart & Company of Chariton. The building features both round and segmental arches, turrets with conical roofs, and finials. The windows are vertical and narrow. The tower was originally topped by a spire, with minor caps that flanked it. The building is similar in style to the Wapello County Courthouse in Ottumwa, which was also designed by Foster & Liebbe and completed the year before. The square the courthouse sits on was included as a contributing site in the Lucas County Courthouse Square Historic District. Besides the courthouse, the square is also the location for the Civil War Memorial (1916-contributing object), the Mormon Trail Marker (1923-contributing object), a bandstand (c. 2000), and Veteran's Memorial (c. 2000). The significance of the courthouse is derived from its association with county government, and the political power and prestige of Chariton as the county seat.
