= Chariton, Iowa =

City in Iowa, United States

- City
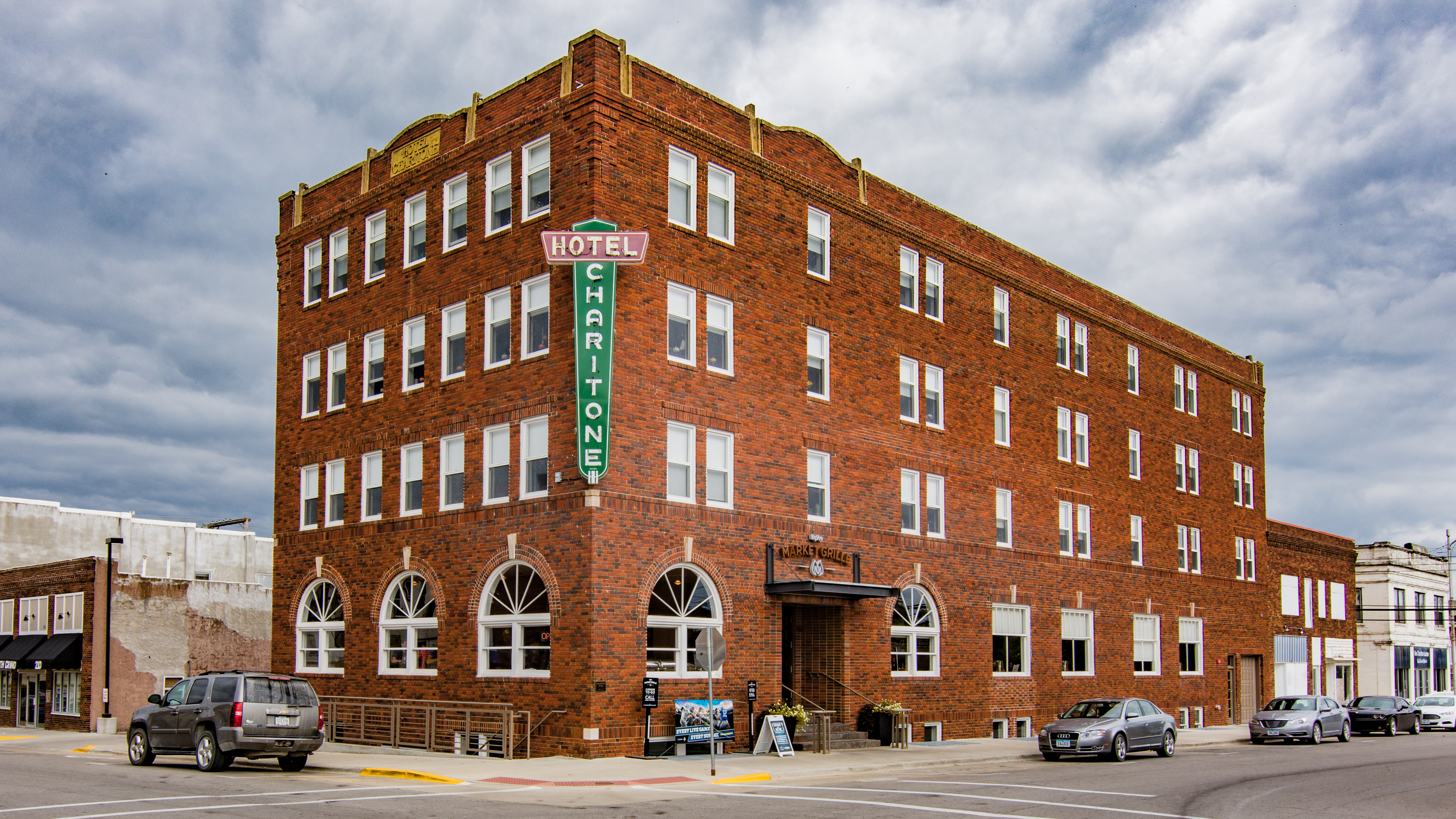
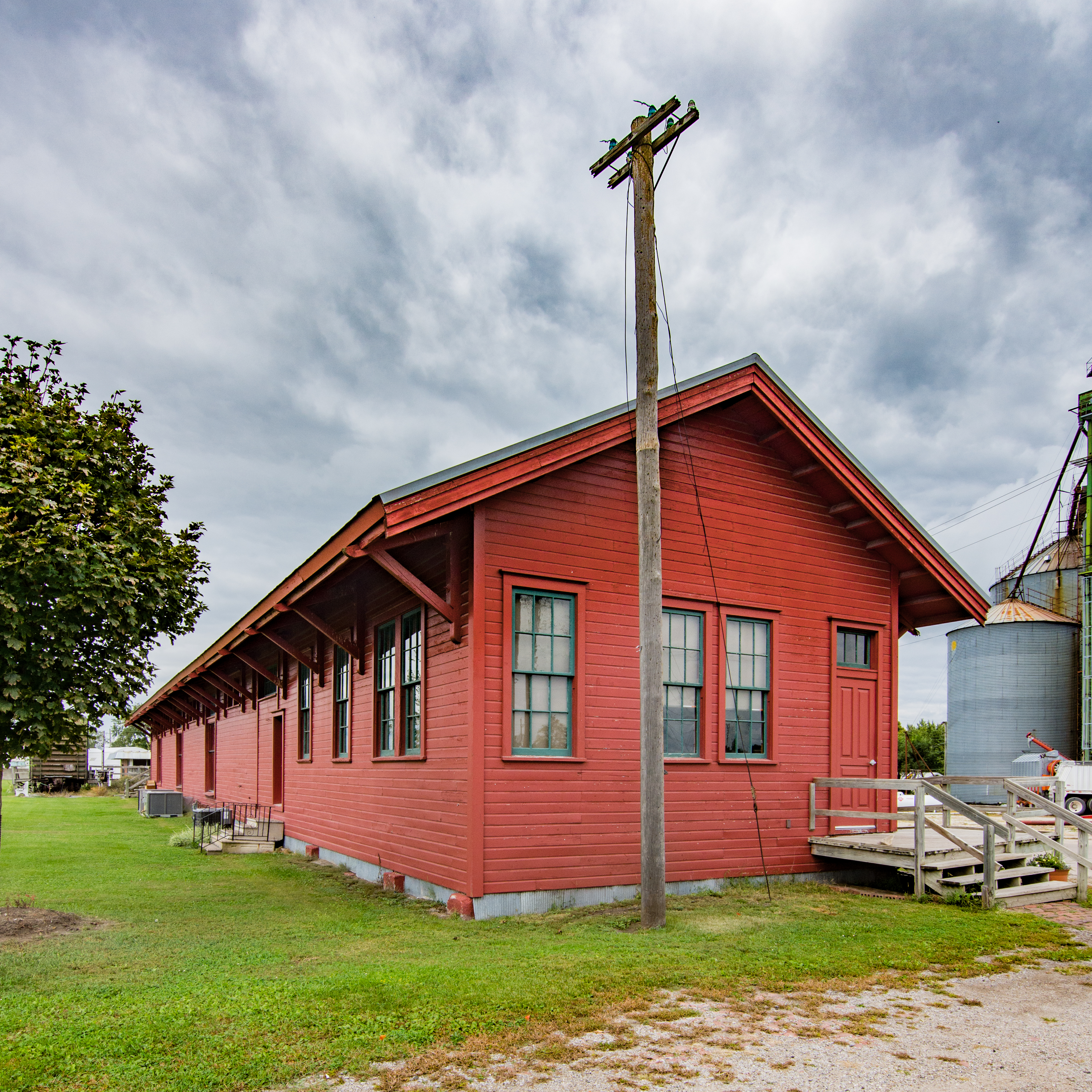
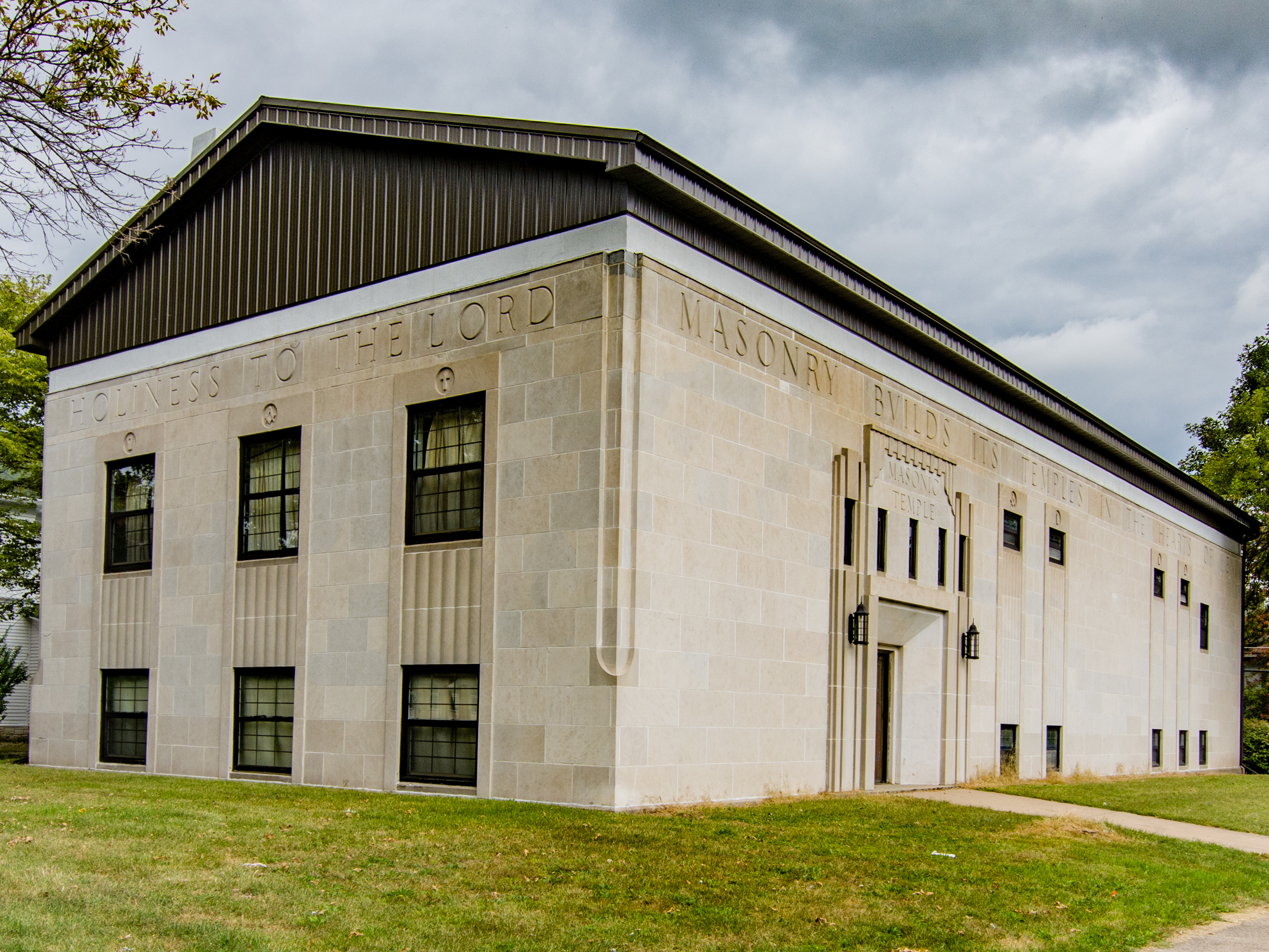
- Hotel Charitone on the Lucas County Courthouse Square Historic District CB&Q Freight Station Chariton Masonic Temple
- Motto: "Pride in Community"
- Location of Chariton, Iowa
- Coordinates: 41°00′23″N 93°18′08″W
- Country: USA
- State: Iowa
- County: Lucas

Area
  - Total: 3.77 sq mi (9.76 km^{2})
  - Land: 3.77 sq mi (9.76 km^{2})
  - Water: 0 sq mi (0.00 km^{2})
- Elevation: 1,040 ft (320 m)

Population (2020)
  - Total: 4,193
  - Density: 1,112.7/sq mi (429.61/km^{2})
- Time zone: UTC-6 (Central (CST))
  - Summer (DST): UTC-5 (CDT)
- ZIP code: 50049
- Area code: 641
- FIPS code: 19-12720
- GNIS feature ID: 467591
- Website: www.chariton.org

Chariton (/ˈʃɛərɪtən/ SHAIR-it-ən) is a city in and the county seat of Lucas County, Iowa, United States. The population was 4,193 at the 2020 census. Chariton is the primary distribution center for and the former corporate headquarters of the Hy-Vee supermarket chain.

== History ==
Chariton was platted in 1850. Chariton was the name of a French trader.

=== Lucas County Courthouse Square Historic District ===
Some of the contributing properties are individually listed on the National Register of Historic Places

- Chariton Public Library
- Hotel Charitone

Designed by local architect William L. Perkins and listed on the National Register of Historic Places for its role in the development of Chariton as a county seat, the Hotel Charitone is listed by the Iowa Historic Preservation Alliance as one of the most endangered sites in Iowa. The hotel is currently undergoing restoration with the majority of the hotel being converted into apartments.

== Geography ==
According to the United States Census Bureau, the city has a total area of 3.82 square miles (9.89 km^{2}), all land.

The Lucas County Courthouse is the highest point of elevation in the whole town.

=== Climate ===
According to the Köppen Climate Classification system, Chariton has a hot-summer humid continental climate, abbreviated "Dfa" on climate maps.

Climate data for Chariton, Iowa, 1991–2020 normals, extremes 1895–present
Month	Jan	Feb	Mar	Apr	May	Jun	Jul	Aug	Sep	Oct	Nov	Dec	Year
Record high °F (°C)	68 (20)	78 (26)	88 (31)	91 (33)	104 (40)	105 (41)	113 (45)	114 (46)	103 (39)	95 (35)	83 (28)	74 (23)	114 (46)
Mean maximum °F (°C)	54.0 (12.2)	59.2 (15.1)	73.4 (23.0)	81.3 (27.4)	85.6 (29.8)	90.7 (32.6)	94.7 (34.8)	93.9 (34.4)	89.8 (32.1)	83.5 (28.6)	69.9 (21.1)	58.7 (14.8)	95.8 (35.4)
Mean daily maximum °F (°C)	31.0 (−0.6)	35.7 (2.1)	48.5 (9.2)	61.0 (16.1)	70.7 (21.5)	80.3 (26.8)	84.5 (29.2)	83.1 (28.4)	76.1 (24.5)	63.8 (17.7)	48.6 (9.2)	36.5 (2.5)	60.0 (15.5)
Daily mean °F (°C)	20.8 (−6.2)	24.7 (−4.1)	36.6 (2.6)	48.0 (8.9)	58.7 (14.8)	68.7 (20.4)	73.0 (22.8)	71.1 (21.7)	62.9 (17.2)	50.8 (10.4)	37.4 (3.0)	26.4 (−3.1)	48.3 (9.0)
Mean daily minimum °F (°C)	10.6 (−11.9)	13.7 (−10.2)	24.7 (−4.1)	35.0 (1.7)	46.6 (8.1)	57.1 (13.9)	61.5 (16.4)	59.0 (15.0)	49.8 (9.9)	37.8 (3.2)	26.1 (−3.3)	16.2 (−8.8)	36.5 (2.5)
Mean minimum °F (°C)	−12.0 (−24.4)	−6.3 (−21.3)	4.9 (−15.1)	19.5 (−6.9)	31.2 (−0.4)	43.2 (6.2)	49.8 (9.9)	48.4 (9.1)	34.4 (1.3)	22.0 (−5.6)	9.8 (−12.3)	−3.4 (−19.7)	−16.9 (−27.2)
Record low °F (°C)	−35 (−37)	−38 (−39)	−32 (−36)	8 (−13)	18 (−8)	34 (1)	39 (4)	35 (2)	20 (−7)	0 (−18)	−13 (−25)	−31 (−35)	−38 (−39)
Average precipitation inches (mm)	0.96 (24)	1.40 (36)	1.90 (48)	4.15 (105)	5.39 (137)	4.92 (125)	4.21 (107)	4.40 (112)	3.71 (94)	2.98 (76)	2.03 (52)	1.27 (32)	37.32 (948)
Average snowfall inches (cm)	7.9 (20)	6.5 (17)	3.5 (8.9)	0.8 (2.0)	0.0 (0.0)	0.0 (0.0)	0.0 (0.0)	0.0 (0.0)	0.0 (0.0)	0.3 (0.76)	2.0 (5.1)	3.1 (7.9)	24.1 (61.66)
Average precipitation days (≥ 0.01 in)	7.2	7.6	9.4	12.0	14.7	12.2	9.7	10.7	9.0	9.0	7.4	7.8	116.7
Average snowy days (≥ 0.1 in)	3.4	3.7	1.6	0.5	0.0	0.0	0.0	0.0	0.0	0.3	0.9	3.1	13.5
Source 1: NOAA
Source 2: National Weather Service

== Demographics ==
Historical populations
Year	Pop.	±%
1860	641	—
1870	1,728	+169.6%
1880	2,977	+72.3%
1890	3,122	+4.9%
1900	3,989	+27.8%
1910	3,794	−4.9%
1920	5,175	+36.4%
1930	5,365	+3.7%
1940	5,754	+7.3%
1950	5,320	−7.5%
1960	5,042	−5.2%
1970	5,009	−0.7%
1980	5,116	+2.1%
1990	4,616	−9.8%
2000	4,573	−0.9%
2010	4,321	−5.5%
2020	4,193	−3.0%
Source:"U.S. Census website". United States Census Bureau. and Iowa Data Center; Source: U.S. Decennial Census

=== 2020 census ===
As of the 2020 census, there were 4,193 people, 1,834 households, and 1,048 families residing in the city. The population density was 1,112.7 inhabitants per square mile (429.6/km^{2}). There were 2,072 housing units at an average density of 549.8 per square mile (212.3/km^{2}).

The median age was 41.0 years. 22.7% of residents were under the age of 18 and 21.5% were 65 years of age or older. 5.5% of residents were between the ages of 20 and 24, 23.7% were from 25 to 44, and 24.6% were from 45 to 64. The gender makeup of the city was 48.8% male and 51.2% female. For every 100 females there were 95.2 males, and for every 100 females age 18 and over there were 94.4 males age 18 and over.

0.0% of residents lived in urban areas, while 100.0% lived in rural areas.

Of the 1,834 households, 26.8% had children under the age of 18 living with them. 42.9% were married-couple households, 6.4% were cohabiting-couple households, 21.1% had a male householder with no spouse or partner present, and 29.6% had a female householder with no spouse or partner present. About 42.9% of all households were non-families, 37.6% were made up of individuals, and 18.5% had someone living alone who was 65 years of age or older.

Of the city's housing units, 11.5% were vacant. The homeowner vacancy rate was 3.0% and the rental vacancy rate was 13.5%.

Racial composition as of the 2020 census
Race	Number	Percent
White	3,904	93.1%
Black or African American	15	0.4%
American Indian and Alaska Native	5	0.1%
Asian	23	0.5%
Native Hawaiian and Other Pacific Islander	0	0.0%
Some other race	83	2.0%
Two or more races	163	3.9%
Hispanic or Latino (of any race)	155	3.7%

=== 2010 census ===
As of the census of 2010, there were 4,321 people, 1,861 households, and 1,109 families living in the city. The population density was 1,131.2 inhabitants per square mile (436.8/km^{2}). There were 2,114 housing units at an average density of 553.4 per square mile (213.7/km^{2}). The racial makeup of the city was 98.7% White, 0.2% African American, 0.2% Asian, 0.1% Pacific Islander, 0.2% from other races, and 0.6% from two or more races. Hispanic or Latino of any race were 1.2% of the population.

There were 1,861 households, of which 28.6% had children under the age of 18 living with them, 46.1% were married couples living together, 9.6% had a female householder with no husband present, 4.0% had a male householder with no wife present, and 40.4% were non-families. 35.9% of all households were made up of individuals, and 19.1% had someone living alone who was 65 years of age or older. The average household size was 2.28 and the average family size was 2.99.

The median age in the city was 42.1 years. 24.6% of residents were under the age of 18; 7.4% were between the ages of 18 and 24; 21.5% were from 25 to 44; 24.8% were from 45 to 64; and 21.9% were 65 years of age or older. The gender makeup of the city was 47.9% male and 52.1% female.

=== 2000 census ===
As of the census of 2000, there were 4,573 people, 1,936 households, and 1,192 families living in the city. The population density was 1,238.2 inhabitants per square mile (478.1/km^{2}). There were 2,155 housing units at an average density of 583.5 per square mile (225.3/km^{2}). The racial makeup of the city was 98.88% White, 0.15% African American, 0.09% Native American, 0.15% Asian, 0.26% from other races, and 0.46% from two or more races. Hispanic or Latino of any race were 0.87% of the population.

There were 1,936 households, out of which 27.4% had children under the age of 18 living with them, 49.1% were married couples living together, 9.6% had a female householder with no husband present, and 38.4% were non-families. 34.6% of all households were made up of individuals, and 18.7% had someone living alone who was 65 years of age or older. The average household size was 2.27 and the average family size was 2.92.

Age spread: 24.6% under the age of 18, 7.5% from 18 to 24, 24.8% from 25 to 44, 20.4% from 45 to 64, and 22.6% who were 65 years of age or older. The median age was 40 years. For every 100 females, there were 90.2 males. For every 100 females age 18 and over, there were 81.8 males.

The median income for a household in the city was $27,844, and the median income for a family was $37,935. Males had a median income of $32,265 versus $21,981 for females. The per capita income for the city was $15,553. About 6.6% of families and 12.7% of the population were below the poverty line, including 14.5% of those under age 18 and 10.5% of those age 65 or over.

== Education ==
The Chariton School District is the only school district in the county since 2008, when the Russell School District closed. There are two elementary schools, Columbus Elementary (K-2 grades) and Van Allen Elementary (3–5 grades); one middle school, Chariton Middle School (6–8 grades); and one high school, Chariton High School (9–12). The high school athletic teams are called the Chargers.

== Infrastructure ==
=== Transportation ===
==== Air Service ====
Owned by the City of Chariton and located 3 miles west of Chariton on US Highway 34, the Chariton Municipal Airport has served the city and Lucas County since April 1947.

==== Highways ====
Chariton is located on U.S. Route 34, which runs east and west to each side of the state. The city is also served by Iowa Highway 14.

== Notable people ==
- Paul Engebretsen, National Football League player
- Everett Gendler, rabbi, social activist, and author
- Theodore Heck, Catholic Benedictine priest, academy president, educator
- T. J. Hockenson, National Football League player for the Minnesota Vikings
- Leo Hoegh, former governor
- Lyle Tuttle, tattoo artist and tattoo historian
- Easter Walters, silent film actress
- Gordon Willey, anthropologist
- Mortimer Wilson, composer

== See also ==
- White Breast Creek
