= List of U.S. places named after non-U.S. places =

There are many places in the United States that are named after places in another country. By far, the majority of the names came from immigrants naming their new home after their former home. As such, they reflect the pattern of immigration to the United States. Immigrants did not just settle in random locations, but rather congregated with others who spoke the same language and had the same religion. Three examples:

- An area in western Michigan centered on Holland in southern Ottawa County was settled by religious refugees from the Netherlands. After a split from the state church in the Netherlands, they were unhappy with the restrictions the Dutch government placed on their religious practices. There are several villages in that region named after villages in the old country.
- A number of Belgian names are found clustered in the Green Bay area of northeastern Wisconsin. This reflects the high concentration of Belgian immigrants in that area.
- Ellis County, Kansas was the destination of a group of Volga Germans who moved there in the 1870s. Their settlements were mostly given the names of the villages they left behind in Russia.

Less concentrated groupings of foreign place names are Norwegian names throughout Minnesota, Czech names in southeast Texas and Dutch names in the Hudson Valley of New York. The Hudson Valley locations are so named because the area was a Dutch colony before it became an English colony.

But not all the immigrants concentrated so heavily. Germans, for example, are one of the largest immigrant groups and places named after German cities are widespread across the United States. However, there is still a general concentration of them in the Midwestern United States, especially in Missouri.

Other sources of foreign names transferred to the U.S. are the Bible and ancient history. Biblically sourced names are widespread and are sometimes the result of naming a settlement after its church. Names from ancient history can also be found in a number of places, although a concentration of them can be found in upstate New York. Names from these two sources can be found in the Ancient World section below the list of countries.

Battle sites are also a source for foreign names. The Mexican–American War is the most common source, but other wars such as the Napoleonic Wars and World War I are also represented.

There is a small number of names whose origins do not fall into the above categories: some were given by railroad companies or taken from books the people naming the town had been reading. Names with yet other unusual sources include Madras, Oregon, which was named after a bolt of Madras cloth seen in the general store, and Poland, Maine, which was named after a medieval song that its first settler liked.

Not all towns whose names are the same as a foreign city or country are named after that city. For example, there is only one US place that is known to be named for the Boston in England. That is Boston, Massachusetts. The Bostons in Indiana, Missouri, New York, and Highland and Summit Counties in Ohio, as well as Boston Corner, New York and South Boston, Virginia are named after Boston, Massachusetts; those in Georgia and Texas are named after people; most other places with the name do not have a known etymology. Also note that places named after people are not on this list, even if that person's name can be traced back to a city. For this reason, cities such as New York, Baltimore, New Orleans and Albuquerque are not on the list. Places named for people can be found at List of places in the United States named after people.

Some places have an indeterminate etymology, where it is known that they are named after a city in a particular country, but there is more than one place with that name and the etymology does not distinguish which one. These entries have "needs disambiguation" in their notes section.

== Afghanistan ==
Place	Namesake	Notes
Kabul	Cabool, Missouri	

== Albania ==
Place	Namesake	Notes
Vlorë	Valona, Georgia	

== Algeria ==
Place	Namesake	Notes
Algiers	Algiers, Louisiana	
Algiers	Algiers, Indiana	
Oran	Oran, Missouri	

== Angola ==
Place	Namesake	Notes
Angola	Angola, Indiana	
Angola	Angola, New York	

== Argentina ==
Place	Namesake	Notes
La Plata	La Plata, Missouri	
La Plata	La Plata, Maryland	

== Armenia ==
Place	Namesake	Notes
Armenia	Armenia, Wisconsin	
Armenia	Armenia Gardens Estates, Florida	
Armenia	Armenia Township, Pennsylvania	
Armenia	Little Armenia, Los Angeles, California	
Armenia	Old Armenian Town, Fresno, California	
Armenia	Armenia, Chester County, South Carolina	

== Australia ==
Place	Namesake	Notes
Ballarat, Victoria	Ballarat, California	
Brisbane, Queensland	Brisbane, California	
Melbourne, Victoria	Melbourne, Florida	
Melbourne, Victoria	Melbourne, Kentucky	
Melbourne, Victoria	Melbourne, Arkansas	
Rockhampton, Queensland	Rockham, South Dakota	

== Austria ==
Place	Namesake	Notes
Deutsch-Wagram	Wagram, North Carolina	named for the Battle of Wagram
Freistadt	Freistatt, Missouri	
Vienna	Vienna, Illinois	
Vienna	Vienna, Indiana	
Vienna	Vienna, Missouri	
Vienna	Vienna, New York	
Vienna	Vienna, Virginia	
Vienna	Vienna, West Virginia	
Wels	New Wells, Missouri	

== Bangladesh ==
Place	Namesake	Notes
Bangladesh	Little Bangladesh, Los Angeles	

== Belgium ==
Place	Namesake	Notes
Antwerp	Antwerp, New York	
Antwerp	Antwerp, Ohio	
Bastogne	Bastogne Gables, North Carolina	
Brussels	Brussels, Wisconsin	
Brussels	Brussels, Illinois	
Belgium	Belgium, Wisconsin	
Charleroi	Charleroi, Pennsylvania	
Ghent	Ghent, Minnesota	
Ghent	Ghent, Kentucky	
Ghent	Ghent, New York	
Ghent	Ghent, West Virginia	
Hoboken	Hoboken, New Jersey	The original name Hoebuck was changed to Hoboken.
Liège	Liege, Missouri	Liege, Missouri was annexed by Bellflower, Missouri in 1960
Namur	Namur, Wisconsin	
Rosières	Rosiere, Wisconsin	
Walhain	Walhain, Wisconsin	
Waterloo	Waterloo, New York	named for the Battle of Waterloo
Waterloo	Waterloo, Indiana	
Waterloo	Waterloo, Illinois	named for the Battle of Waterloo
Waterloo	Waterloo, Iowa	
Watervliet	Watervliet, New York	
Watervliet	Watervliet, Michigan	

== Bolivia ==
Place	Namesake	Notes
Bolivia	Bolivia, North Carolina	
La Paz	La Paz, Indiana	
Potosí	Potosi, Missouri	
Potosí	Potosi, Texas	
Potosí	Potosi, Wisconsin	

== Brazil ==
Place	Namesake	Notes
Brazil	Brazil, Indiana	

== Bulgaria ==
Place	Namesake	Notes
Pleven	Plevna, Montana	
Pleven	Plevna, Kansas	
Shumen (formerly: Shumla)	Shumla, Texas	
Sofia	Sofia, New Mexico	
Varna	Varna, Illinois	

== Canada ==
Place	Namesake	Notes
Acton, Ontario	Acton Township, Minnesota	
Alma, Ontario	Alma, North Dakota	
Amherst, Nova Scotia	Amherst, Wisconsin	
Annapolis Valley, Nova Scotia	Annapolis, California	
Ardoch, Ontario	Ardoch, North Dakota	
Auburn, Ontario	Auburn, North Dakota	
Aylmer, Ontario	Alymer, North Dakota	
Ayr, Ontario	Ayr, Michigan	
Beaverton, Ontario	Beaverton, Michigan	
Belleville, Ontario	Belleville, Wisconsin	
Brampton, Ontario	Brampton, North Dakota	
Brantford, Ontario	Brantford, North Dakota	
Calgary, Alberta	Kalgary, Texas	
Chatham-Kent, Ontario	Chatham, Michigan	
Cobourg, Ontario	Coburg, Indiana	
Conway, Ontario	Conway, North Dakota	
Devizes, Ontario	Devizes, Kansas	
Dundas, Ontario	Dundas, Minnesota	
Fenwick, Ontario	Fenwick, Michigan	
Fingal, Ontario	Fingal, North Dakota	
Galt, Ontario	Galt, California	Galt, ON was amalgamated into Cambridge in 1973
Gentilly, Quebec	Gentilly Township, Minnesota	
Glenburn, Ontario	Glenburn, North Dakota	
South Glengarry, Ontario	Glengary, Idaho	possibly named by David Thompson after his hometown
Guelph, Ontario	Guelph, North Dakota	
Halifax, Nova Scotia	Halifax, Missouri	
Hamilton, Ontario	Hamilton, North Dakota	
Hatley, Quebec	Hatley, Wisconsin	
Hemmingford, Quebec	Hemingford, Nebraska	
Holyrood, Ontario	Holyrood, Kansas	
Inglewood, Ontario	Inglewood, California	
Joliette, Quebec	Joliette, North Dakota	
Kenmore, Ontario	Kenmore, Washington	
Keswick Ridge, New Brunswick	Keswick, Michigan	
Kingston, Ontario	Kingston, Wisconsin	
Kinloss, Ontario	Kinloss Township, Walsh County, North Dakota	
Lindsay, Ontario	Lindsay, Nebraska	
Minto, Ontario	Minto, North Dakota	
Moncton, New Brunswick	Monkton, Maryland	
Montreal, Quebec	Montreal, Missouri	
Napanee, Ontario	Naponee, Nebraska	
Omemee, Ontario	Omemee, North Dakota	
Ontario, Canada	Ontario, California	
Ontario, Canada	Ontario, Ohio	
Ontario, Canada	Ontario, Oregon	
Orillia, Ontario	Orillia, Washington	
Oshawa, Ontario	Oshawa, Minnesota	
Osnabruck, Ontario	Osnabrock, North Dakota	Osnabruck ON (which was named for Osnabruck in Germany) was merged with Cornwall to form South Stormont in 1998
Perth, Ontario	Perth, North Dakota	
Pictou, Nova Scotia	Pictou, Colorado	
Quebec City, Quebec	Quebec, Montana	
Regina, Saskatchewan	Regina, New Mexico	
Saint-Jean-sur-Richelieu, Quebec	Saint John, North Dakota	
St. Thomas, Ontario	St. Thomas, North Dakota	
Sarnia, Ontario	Sarnia, North Dakota	
Sherbrooke, Quebec	Sherbrooke, North Dakota	
Sydney, Nova Scotia	Sidney, North Dakota	
Simcoe, Ontario	Simcoe, North Dakota	
Strabane, Ontario	Strabane, North Dakota	
Terrebonne, Quebec	Terrebonne Township, Minnesota	
Thedford, Ontario	Thedford, Nebraska	
Toronto, Ontario	Toronto, Kansas	
Toronto, Ontario	Toronto, Ohio	
Truro, Nova Scotia	Truro Township, Ohio	
Uxbridge, Ontario	Uxbridge, North Dakota	
Watford, Ontario	Watford City, North Dakota	Watford, ON was merged into Warwick in 2001
Windsor, Ontario	Windsor, North Dakota	

== Chile ==
Place	Namesake	Notes
Valparaíso	Valparaiso, Indiana	

== China ==
Place	Namesake	Notes
Beijing	Pekin, Illinois	
Beijing	New Pekin, Indiana	
China	China, New York	
Guangzhou	Canton, Georgia	
Guangzhou	Canton, New York	
Guangzhou	Canton, Ohio	
Guangzhou	Canton, Massachusetts	
Guangzhou	Canton, Michigan	
Jilin City	Kiron, Iowa	Jilin was formerly romanized as Kirin
Nanjing	Nankin Township, Michigan	
Shanghai	Shanghai, West Virginia	
Shanghai	Shanghai City, Illinois	
Wusong	Woosung, Illinois	

== Colombia ==
Place	Namesake	Notes
Bogotá	Bogota, Illinois	
Bogotá	Bogota, Tennessee	
Bogotá	Bogata, Texas	

== Cuba ==
Place	Namesake	Notes
Cuba	Cuba, Missouri	
Cuba	Cuba, Illinois	
Cuba	Cuba Township, Lake County, Illinois	
Cuba	Cuba, New York	
Havana	Havana, Illinois	
Havana	Havana, Arkansas	
Matanzas	Matanzas, Kentucky	
Matanzas	Matanzas Beach, Illinois	
Miramar, Havana	Miramar, Florida	
Yara	Yara, Minnesota	

== Czech Republic ==
Place	Namesake	Notes
Beroun	Beroun, Minnesota	
Brno	Bruno, Nebraska	
Dolní Loučky	Loucky, Nebraska	
Domažlice (German: Taus)	Taus, Wisconsin	
Frenštát pod Radhoštěm	Frenstat, Texas	
Frýdek-Místek	Frydek, Texas	
Horní Loučky	Loucky, Nebraska	
Hostýn	Hostyn, Texas	
Hradec Králové	New Hradec, North Dakota	
Karlín	Karlin, Michigan	
Karlín	Karlin, Missouri	
Karlovy Vary (German: Karlsbad)	Carlsbad, New Mexico	
Karlovy Vary (German: Karlsbad)	Carlsbad, California	
Kolín	Kolin, Louisiana	
Malín (part of Kutná Hora)	Malin, Oregon	
Lidice	Lidice, Illinois	renamed from Stern Park Gardens in July, 1942 in response to the Lidice Massacre; now part of Crest Hill, Illinois
Litice Castle	Lititz, Pennsylvania	
Mělník	Melnik, Wisconsin	
Nechanice	Nechanitz, Texas	
Olomouc (German: Olmütz)	Olmitz, Kansas	
Pacov (German: Patzau)	Patzau, Wisconsin	
Písek	Pisek, North Dakota	
Plzeň (German: Pilsen)	Pilsen, Kansas	
Prague	New Prague, Minnesota	
Prague	Prague, Oklahoma	
Prague	Praha, Texas	
Protivín	Protivin, Iowa	
Rožnov pod Radhoštěm	Roznov, Texas	
Roztoky	Rostok, Wisconsin	
Slavkov u Brna (German: Austerlitz)	Austerlitz, New York	named after the Battle of Austerlitz
Tábor	Tabor Township, Minnesota	
Veselí nad Lužnicí	Veseli, Minnesota	
Vodňany	Vodnany, South Dakota	
Vsetín	Vsetin, Texas	

== Denmark ==
Place	Namesake	Notes
Copenhagen	Copenhagen, New York	
Denmark	Denmark, Maine	
Denmark	Denmark, South Carolina	
Helsingør	Elsinore, Utah	
Nysted	Nysted, Nebraska	
Odense	Odense, Kansas	
Ringsted	Ringsted, Iowa	
Torning	Torning Township, Minnesota	
Viborg	Viborg, South Dakota	

== Ecuador ==
Place	Namesake	Notes
Quito	Quito, Tennessee	

== Egypt ==
For more cities in Egypt, see the Ancient world section below.

Place	Namesake	Notes
Cairo	Cairo, Illinois	
Cairo	Cairo, West Virginia	
Cairo	Cairo, Ohio	
Cairo	Cairo, Georgia	
Cairo	Cairo, New York	
Egypt	Egypt, Texas	
Luxor	Luxor, Pennsylvania	
Memphis	Memphis, Tennessee	
Memphis	Memphis, Florida	
Memphis	Memphis, Missouri	
Memphis	Memphis, Texas	
Memphis	Memphis, Michigan	
Memphis	Memphis, New York	
Memphis	Memphis, Indiana	
Memphis	West Memphis, Arkansas	
Suez	Suez Township, Illinois	

== Finland ==
Place	Namesake	Notes
Finland	Finland, Minnesota	
Liminka	Liminga, Michigan	
Oulu	Oulu, Wisconsin	
Paavola	Paavola, Michigan	
Pori	Pori, Michigan	
Salo	Salo Township, Minnesota	
Tapiola	Tapiola, Michigan	
Toijala	Toivola, Michigan	
Toijala	Toivola Township, Minnesota	
Vaasa	Wasas, Michigan	
Vaasa	Waasa Township	

== France ==
Place	Namesake	Notes
Abbeville	Abbeville, Louisiana	
Aix-en-Provence	Aix, Indiana	
Avallon	Avalon, Missouri	
Bayonne	Bayonne, Nebraska	
Bayonne	Bayonne, New Jersey	
Beaufort-en-Anjou	Beaufort, South Carolina	
Belfort	Belfort, Ohio	
Bethune	Bethune, Colorado	
Bordeaux	Bardo, Kentucky	
Bordeaux	Bordeaux, South Carolina	
Boulogne-sur-Mer	Boulogne, Florida	
Calais	Calais, Maine	
Calais	Calais, Vermont	
Château de la Grange-Bléneau	LaGrange, Georgia	home of Gilbert du Motier, Marquis de Lafayette
Châteaugay	Chateaugay, New York	
Chantilly, Oise	Chantilly, Missouri	
Cherbourg	Cherbourg, North Carolina	
Clermont-Ferrand	Clermont, Florida	
Colmar	Colmar, Illinois	
Dunkirk	Dunkirk, New York	
Exermont	Exermont, Illinois	
Ferney-Voltaire	Ferney, South Dakota	
Grenoble	Grenoble, Pennsylvania	
Guyencourt	Guyencourt, Delaware	
La Rochelle	New Rochelle, New York	
Le Havre	Havre de Grace, Maryland	
Lille	Lisle, New York	
Lourdes	Lourdes, Iowa	
Lyon	Lyons, New York, with -s by confusion with Lyons-la-Forêt	
Lyon	Lyon, Mississippi	
Marseille	Marseilles, Illinois	
Menton	Mentone, Texas	
Metz	Metz, Missouri	named for the Siege of Metz (1870)
Montpellier	Montpelier, Vermont	
Montpellier	Montpelier, Ohio	
Montpellier	Montpelier, Indiana	
Nice	Nice, California	
Orléans	Orleans, New York	
Paris	Paris, Arkansas	
Paris	Paris, Idaho	
Paris	Paris, Illinois	
Paris	Paris, Kentucky	
Paris	Paris, Maine	
Paris	Paris, Missouri	
Paris	Paris, New York	
Paris	Paris, Tennessee	
Paris	Paris, Texas	
Roanne	Roann, Indiana	
Roubaix	Roubaix, South Dakota	
Saint-Cloud	St. Cloud, Minnesota	
Sainte-Mère-Église	Ste. Mere Eglise, North Carolina	
Saint-Omer	Saint Omer, Indiana	
Sedan	Sedan, Kansas	resemblance of the town site to that of the Battle of Sedan in the Franco-Prussian War
Strasbourg	Strasburg, Pennsylvania	
Toulon	Toulon, Kansas	
Valmy	Valmy, Nevada	named for the Battle of Valmy
Vaucluse	Vaucluse, South Carolina	
Verdun	Verdunville, West Virginia	named for the Battle of Verdun
Versailles, Yvelines	Versailles, Kentucky	
Versailles, Yvelines	North Versailles Township, Pennsylvania	
Versailles, Yvelines	Versailles, Missouri	
Vichy	Vichy, Missouri	
Vincennes	Vincennes, Indiana	
Wissembourg, Alsace	Weisenberg Township, Pennsylvania	

== Georgia (country) ==
Place	Namesake	Notes
Tbilisi	Tiflis, Washington	

== Germany ==
Place	Namesake	Notes
Altona, Hamburg	Altona, New York	
Amelith, Lower Saxony	Amelith, Michigan	
Arnsberg, North Rhine-Westphalia	Arnsberg, Missouri	
Augsburg, Bavaria	Augsburg, Illinois	
Baden-Baden, Baden-Württemberg	Baden, Pennsylvania	
Bad Pyrmont, Lower Saxony	Pyrmont, Ohio	
Benzen, Lower Saxony	Bensenville, Illinois	
Bergholz, Mecklenburg-Vorpommern	Bergholz, New York	
Berlin	Berlin, Connecticut	
Berlin	Berlin, Alabama	
Berlin	Berlin, Georgia	
Berlin	Berlin, New Hampshire	
Berlin	Berlin, New York	
Berlin	Berlin, Pennsylvania	
Berlin	Berlin, Wisconsin	
Berlin	Berlin, Vermont	
Berlin	East Berlin, Pennsylvania	
Berlin	New Berlin, Pennsylvania	
Berlin	New Berlin, Wisconsin	
Bingen am Rhein, Rhineland-Palatinate	Bingen, Washington	
Blindheim, Bavaria	Blenheim, New Jersey	probably named for the Battle of Blenheim
Bonn, North Rhine-Westphalia	Bonn, Ohio	
Braunfels Castle, Hesse	New Braunfels, Texas	
Braunschweig, Lower Saxony	Brunswick, Indiana	
Bremen, Free Hanseatic City of Bremen	Bremen, Georgia	
Bremen, Free Hanseatic City of Bremen	Bremen, Indiana	
Brilon, North Rhine-Westphalia	Brillion, Wisconsin	
Coburg, Bavaria	Coburg, Oregon	named for a horse that had been imported from Coburg, Germany
Cologne, North Rhine-Westphalia	Cologne, Minnesota	
Cottbus, Brandenburg	Cottbus, Missouri	
Crivitz	Crivitz, Wisconsin	
Darmstadt, Hesse	Darmstadt, Indiana	
Dissen, Lower Saxony	Dissen, Missouri	
Dolberg, North Rhine-Westphalia	Dolberg, Oklahoma	
Dresden, Saxony	Dresden, Kansas	
Durlach, Baden-Württemberg	Dorloo, New York	
Dutzow, Mecklenburg-Vorpommern	Dutzow, Missouri	
Eitzen, Lower Saxony	Eitzen, Minnesota	
Elberfeld, Wuppertal, North Rhine-Westphalia	Elberfeld, Indiana	
Emden, Lower Saxony	Emden, Illinois	
Emmerich am Rhein, North Rhine-Westphalia	Emrick, North Dakota	
Ettersburg, Thuringia	Ettersburg, California	
Flensburg, Schleswig-Holstein	Flensburg, Minnesota	
Frankfurt, Hesse	Frankfort, Illinois	
Freiburg, Lower Saxony	Friberg Township, Minnesota	
Fulda, Hesse	Fulda, Minnesota	
Glandorf, Lower Saxony	Glandorf, Ohio	
Gotha, Thuringia	Gotha, Florida	
Hamburg	Hamburg, New York	
Hanover, Lower Saxony	Hanover, Pennsylvania	
Heidelberg, Baden-Württemberg	Heidelberg, Pennsylvania	
Hohenlinden, Bavaria	Lynden, Washington	named for the poem Hohenlinden by Thomas Campbell which is about the Battle of Hohenlinden
Jena, Thuringia	Jena, Alabama	
Jena, Thuringia	Jena, Louisiana	
Karlsruhe, Baden-Württemberg	Karlsruhe, North Dakota	
Kiel, Schleswig-Holstein	Kiel, Wisconsin	
Landau, Rhineland-Palatinate	Lando, South Carolina	
Lastrup, Lower Saxony	Lastrup, Minnesota	
Leipzig, Saxony	Leipsic, Ohio	
Lennep, North Rhine-Westphalia	Lennep, Montana	
Lübeck, Schleswig-Holstein	Lubec, Maine	
Lützen, Saxony-Anhalt	Lutsen Township, Minnesota	named for the Battle of Lützen (1632)
Mannheim, Baden-Württemberg	Manheim, Pennsylvania	
Mainz, Rhineland-Palatinate	Mentz, New York	
Marne, Schleswig-Holstein	Marne, Iowa	
Marne, Schleswig-Holstein	Marne, Michigan	
Melle, Lower Saxony	New Melle, Missouri	
Meppen, Lower Saxony	Meppen, Illinois	
Minden, North Rhine-Westphalia	Minden, Louisiana	
Münster, North Rhine-Westphalia	Muenster, Texas	
Munich, Bavaria	Munich, North Dakota	
Neuburg an der Donau, Bavaria	Newberg, Oregon	
Neu-Ulm, Bavaria	New Ulm, Minnesota	
Niederfrohna, Saxony	Frohna, Missouri	
Norden, Lower Saxony	Norden, Nebraska	
Offenburg, Baden-Württemberg	New Offenburg, Missouri	
Oldenburg, Lower Saxony	Oldenburg, Indiana	
Olpe, North Rhine-Westphalia	Olpe, Kansas	
Paderborn, North Rhine-Westphalia	Paderborn, Illinois	
Paitzdorf, Thuringia	Uniontown, Missouri	original name of Uniontown was Paitzdorf
Potsdam, Brandenburg	Potsdam, New York	
Rheinberg, North Rhine-Westfalia	Reinbeck, Iowa	
Rheydt, North Rhine-Westphalia	Rheiderland Township, Minnesota	
Riegel am Kaiserstuhl, Baden-Württemberg	New Riegel, Ohio	
Seelitz, Saxony	Seelitz, Missouri	
Stendal, Saxony-Anhalt	Stendal, Indiana	
Stuttgart, Baden-Württemberg	Stuttgart, Arkansas	
Trier, Rhineland-Palatinate	New Trier, Minnesota	
Ulm, Baden-Württemberg	New Ulm, Texas	
Wartburg Castle, Thuringia	Wartburg, Tennessee	
Weimar, Thuringia	Weimar, Texas	
Weingarten, Württemberg	Weingarten, Missouri	
Weinsberg, Baden-Württemberg	Winesburg, Ohio	
Welda, North Rhine-Westphalia	Welda, Kansas	
Wittenberg, Saxony-Anhalt	Wittenberg, Missouri	
Worms, Rhineland-Palatinate	Worms, Nebraska	
Zell am Harmersbach, Baden-Württemberg	Zell, Missouri	

== Greece ==
For more cities in Greece, see the Ancient world section below.

Place	Namesake	Notes
Athens	Athens, Alabama	
Athens	Athens, Georgia	
Athens	Athens, Ohio	
Athens	Athens, New York	
Athens	Athens, Texas	
Athens	Athens, Illinois	
Athens	New Athens, Illinois	
Crete	Crete, Illinois	Named after the island where Saint Paul stopped on his way to Rome.
Greece	Greece, New York	
Larissa	Larissa, Texas	
Larissa	Larissa, Arizona	
Nafpaktos (Venetian: Lepanto)	Lepanto, Arkansas	named for the Battle of Lepanto
Tempe	Tempe, Arizona	
Thessaloniki	Salona, Pennsylvania	
Volos	Volo, Illinois	
Rhodes	Rhode Island	There is probably no direct connection between the two locations despite some debate on the matter. The name appears to derive from the ancient Italian word "Rode," meaning "red," as part of the state was discovered by the Italian explorer Giovanni da Verrazzano, who discovered island of Aquidneck and called it "Rode". However, due to the similarity in the names, the possibility that the name was inspired by the Greek island remains a topic of ongoing discussion.

== Honduras ==
Place	Namesake	Notes
Copán	Copan, Oklahoma	Maya city, now an archaeological site

== Hungary ==
Place	Namesake	Notes
Buda	Buda, Illinois	named before the merger with Pest
Budapest	Budapest, Georgia	
Budapest	Budapest, Missouri	
Szombathely (Latin: Savaria or Sabaria)	Siberia, Indiana	originally meant to be Sabaria, the post office changed the name, apparently thinking it was an error
Tokaj	Tokaj, Georgia	

== Iceland ==
Place	Namesake	Notes
Akranes	Akra Township, North Dakota	
Þingvellir	Thingvalla Township, North Dakota	

== India ==
Place	Namesake	Notes
Almora, Kumaon	Almora, Illinois	
Chennai (Madras), Tamil Nadu	Madras, Oregon	named for a bolt of Madras cloth
Delhi, National Capital Territory	Delhi Township, Michigan	
Delhi, National Capital Territory	Delhi, New York	
Delhi, National Capital Territory	Delhi, California	
Delhi, National Capital Territory	Delhi, Colorado	
Golkonda, Telangana	Golconda, Illinois	
Kolkata, West Bengal	Calcutta, Ohio	
Lucknow, Uttar Pradesh	Lucknow, Pennsylvania	
Mumbai (Bombay), Maharashtra	Bombay, New York	
Shimla, Himachal Pradesh	Simla, Colorado	
Vadodara, Gujarat	Baroda, Michigan	
Vrindavan, Uttar Pradesh	New Vrindaban, West Virginia	

== Indonesia ==
Place	Namesake	Notes
Jakarta (Batavia)	Batavia, Illinois	
Jakarta (Batavia)	Batavia, New York	

== Iran ==
For cities in Iran, see the Ancient world section below.

== Iraq ==
For more cities in Iraq, see the Ancient world section below.

Place	Namesake	Notes
Baghdad	Bagdad, Arizona	
Baghdad	Bagdad, Florida	
Baghdad	Bagdad, Kentucky	

== Ireland ==
Place	Namesake	Notes
County Antrim	Antrim County, Michigan	
County Antrim	Antrim, New Hampshire	
Ardmore, County Waterford	Ardmore, Pennsylvania	
Athlone, County Westmeath	Athlone, California	
Avoca, County Wicklow	Avoca, Pennsylvania	
Bandon, County Cork	Bandon, Oregon	
Bantry, County Cork	Bantry, North Dakota	
Carbury, County Kildare	Carbury, North Dakota	
Carrick-on-Suir, County Tipperary	Carrick (Pittsburgh), Pennsylvania	
Cashel, County Tipperary	Cashel Township, Minnesota	
Castlefin, County Donegal	Castle Fin, Illinois	
County Clare	Clare, Michigan	
Clonmel, County Tipperary	Clonmel, Kansas	
Clontarf, Dublin	Clontarf, Minnesota	
Cork	Cork, Georgia	
Croom, County Limerick	Croom, Maryland	
Dollymount, Dublin	Dollymount Township, Minnesota	
County Donegal	Donegal, Pennsylvania	
Donnybrook, Dublin	Donnybrook, North Dakota	
Dromore, County Down	Drumore Township, Pennsylvania	
Dublin	Dublin, California	
Dublin	Dublin, Georgia	
Dublin	Dublin, New Hampshire	
Dublin	Dublin, Ohio	
Dublin	Dublin, Texas	
Duncannon, County Wexford	Duncannon, Pennsylvania	
Dundalk, County Louth	Dundalk, Maryland	
Greencastle, County Donegal	Greencastle, Pennsylvania	
Ireland	Ireland, Indiana	
Kenmare, County Kerry	Kenmare, North Dakota	
Kildare	Kildare, Wisconsin	
Kilkenny	Kilkenny, Minnesota	
Killarney, County Kerry	Killarney, Florida	
Kinsale, County Cork	Kinsale, Virginia	
Letterkenny, County Donegal	Letterkenny Township, Pennsylvania	
Limerick	Limerick, Maine	
Lismore, County Waterford	Lismore, Minnesota	
Lucan, Dublin	Lucan, Minnesota	
Menlo, County Galway	Menlo Park, California	
Monaghan	Monaghan Township, Pennsylvania	
Moville, County Donegal	Moville, Iowa	
Rathdrum, County Wicklow	Rathdrum, Idaho	
County Roscommon	Roscommon, Michigan	
Sligo	Sligo, Pennsylvania	
Tralee, County Kerry	Tralee, West Virginia	
County Tyrone	Tyrone Township, Kent County, Michigan	
County Tyrone	Tyrone Township, Livingston County, Michigan	
Waterford	Waterford, Connecticut	
Waterford	Waterford, Virginia	
Westport, County Mayo	Westport, Wisconsin	
County Wexford	Wexford County, Michigan	
County Wexford	Wexford, Pennsylvania	

== Israel ==
For cities in Israel, see the Ancient world section below.

- Bethel — Bethel, Alaska
- Bethel — Bethel, Connecticut

== Italy ==
For more cities in Italy, see the Ancient world section below.

Place	Namesake	Notes
Aosta Valley	Valdosta, Georgia	
Ancona	Ancona, Illinois	
Anzio	Anzio Acres, North Carolina	
Arcole	Arcola, Missouri	named for the Battle of Arcole
Assisi	Assisi, Illinois	
Asti	Asti, California	
Carrara	Carrara, Nevada	
Como	Como, Missouri	
Cremona	Cremona, Maryland	
Florence	Florence, Alabama	There are many cities in the US named Florence, but this is the only one named after the Italian city. All the others were named after people.
Genoa	Genoa, New York	
Genoa	Genoa, Nebraska	
Genoa	Genoa, Nevada	
Genoa	Genoa, Wisconsin	
Imola	Imola, California	
Italy	Italia, Florida	
Italy	Italy, New York	
Italy	Italy, Texas	
La Verna	Alverno, Wisconsin	
Lido di Venezia	Lido Beach, New York	
Lodi	Lodi, New Jersey	
Lodi	Lodi, New York	
Lodi	Lodi, California	
Lodi	Lodi, Wisconsin	
Loreto, Marche	Loretto, Pennsylvania	
Mantua	Mantua, Alabama	
Mantua	Mantua, Ohio	named for the Siege of Mantua (1796–97)
Milan	Milan, Illinois	
Milan	Milan, Michigan	
Milan	Milan, Missouri	
Milan	Milan, New Hampshire	(Potentially named after the Italian city)
Milan	Milan, Ohio	named for the nearby Milan River, which was named after the Italian city
Milan	Milan, Tennessee	
Milan	Milan, Indiana	
Modena	Modena, Missouri	
Modena	Modena, Pennsylvania	
Modena	Modena, Utah	
Mondovì	Mondovi, Wisconsin	named for the Battle of Mondovì
Naples	Naples, Florida	
Naples	Naples, Idaho	
Naples	Naples, New York	
Orvieto	Orvieto, California	
Padua	Padua, Ohio	
Palermo	Palermo, California	
Parma	Parma, Ohio	
Parma	Parma, Idaho	
Pavia	Pavia, Pennsylvania	
Perugia	Perugia, Pennsylvania	
Ravenna	Ravenna, Ohio	
Rome	Rome, Georgia	
Rome	Rome, Illinois	
Rome	Rome, New York	
Rome	Rome City, Indiana	
Roseto Valfortore	Roseto, Pennsylvania	
Salerno	Port Salerno, Florida	
Salina	Salina, New York	
Savona	Savona, New York	
Sorrento	Sorrento, Louisiana	
Spinetta Marengo	Marengo, Illinois	named for the Battle of Marengo
Subiaco, Lazio	Subiaco, Arkansas	
Syracuse	Syracuse, New York	
Taranto	Tarentum, Pennsylvania	
Tivoli, Lazio	Tivoli, Texas	
Trento	Trent, Minnesota	
Turin	Turin, Georgia	
Venice	Venice Beach, California	
Venice	Venice, Florida	
Venice	Venice, Illinois	
Venice	Venice, Missouri	
Venice	Venice, Los Angeles	
Verona	Verona, Missouri	
Verona	Verona, New Jersey	
Verona	Verona, Pennsylvania	
Verona	Verona, Wisconsin	

== Japan ==
Place	Namesake	Notes
Tokyo	Jeddo, Pennsylvania	Jeddo is an anglicization of Edo, the former name of Tokyo
Tokyo	Tokio, North Dakota	Potentially after Tokyo, Japan
Tokyo	Tokio, Texas (Terry County)	Likely, but not certain to be named after Tokyo, Japan
Tokyo	Tokio, Texas (McLennan County)	Name changed to Wiggins during WWII; reverted to Tokio in the late 1980s
Japan	Japan, Missouri	Named after local Church of the Holy Martyrs of Japan.

== Jordan ==
For cities in Jordan, see the Ancient world section below.

== Latvia ==
Place	Namesake	Notes
Riga	Riga, Michigan	
Livonia	Livonia, Indiana	
Livonia	Livonia, Michigan	

== Lebanon ==
For more cities in Lebanon, see the Ancient world section below.

Place	Namesake	Notes
Lebanon	Lebanon, Tennessee	
Lebanon	Lebanon, Missouri	
Lebanon	Lebanon, Connecticut	
Lebanon	Lebanon, Indiana	
Lebanon	Lebanon, New Hampshire	Named for Lebanon, CT
Lebanon	Lebanon, Maine	
Lebanon	Lebanon, Ohio	
Lebanon	Lebanon, Oregon	
Baalbek	Balbec, Indiana	
Mount Lebanon	Mt. Lebanon, Pennsylvania	

== Libya ==
Place	Namesake	Notes
Tripoli	New Tripoli, Pennsylvania	

== Lithuania ==
Place	Namesake	Notes
Vilnius (Polish: Wilno)	Wilno, Minnesota	

== Luxembourg ==
Place	Namesake	Notes
Luxembourg (German: Luxemburg)	Luxemburg, Wisconsin	

== Malta ==
Place	Namesake	Notes
Malta	Malta, Montana	

== Mali ==
Place	Namesake	Notes
Timbuktu	Timbuctoo, California	

== Mexico ==
Place	Namesake	Notes
Acala Municipality, Chiapas	Acala, Texas	
Alvarado, Veracruz	Alvarado, Texas	Mexican–American War reference
Arizpe, Sonora	Arispie Township, Illinois	
Atlixco, Jalisco	Atrisco Land Grant, New Mexico	
Buena Vista, Coahuila	Buena Vista, Michigan	named for the Battle of Buena Vista
Buena Vista, Coahuila	Buena Vista, Mississippi	also named for the Battle of Buena Vista
Buena Vista, Coahuila	Buena Vista Township, New Jersey	named for the Battle of Buena Vista; the neighboring borough of Buena is named for the township
Camargo, Chihuahua	Camargo, Illinois	
Camargo Municipality, Tamaulipas	Camargo, Kentucky	
Chalco de Díaz Covarrubias, state of Mexico	Chalco, Nebraska	
Churubusco, Federal District	Churubusco, Indiana	named for the Battle of Churubusco
Córdoba, Veracruz	Cordova, Alabama	
Durango City, Durango	Durango, Colorado	
La Paz, Baja California Sur	La Paz, Arizona	
León, Guanajuato	Leon, Monroe County, Wisconsin	
Magdalena Contreras, Federal District	Contreras, Indiana	named after the Battle of Contreras
Matamoros, Tamaulipas	Matamoras, Ohio	Mexican–American War reference
Matamoros, Tamaulipas	Matamoras, Pennsylvania	
Mexico	Mexico, Maine	
Mexico	Mexico, Missouri	
Ciudad Mier, Tamaulipoas	Mier, Indiana	
Monterrey, Nuevo León	Monterey, Indiana	named for Battle of Monterrey
Parral, Chihuahua	Parral, Ohio	
Perote, Veracruz	Perote, Alabama	
Saltillo, Coahuila	Saltillo, Indiana	Mexican–American War reference
Talpa de Allende, Jalisco	Talpa, New Mexico	
Tampico, Tamaulipas	Tampico, Washington	
Taxco, Guerrero	Tasco, Kansas	
Toluca, state of Mexico	Toluca, Illinois	
Veracruz, Veracruz	Vera Cruz, Indiana	
Xalapa, Veracruz	Jalapa, Tennessee	

== Morocco ==
Place	Namesake	Notes
Essaouira	Mogadore, Ohio	
Casablanca	Casablanca, North Carolina	
Morocco	Morocco, Indiana	
Tangier	Tangier, Virginia	

== Myanmar ==
Place	Namesake	Notes
Inwa	Ava, New York	
Mandalay	Mandalay, Louisiana	

== Netherlands ==
Place	Namesake	Notes
Almelo	New Almelo, Kansas	
Amsterdam	Amsterdam, Georgia	
Amsterdam	Amsterdam, Missouri	
Amsterdam	Amsterdam, Montana	
Amsterdam	Amsterdam, New Jersey	
Amsterdam	Amsterdam (city), New York	
Amsterdam	Amsterdam (town), New York	
Amsterdam	Amsterdam, Ohio	
Amsterdam	Amsterdam, Pennsylvania	
Amsterdam	Amsterdam, Texas	
Amsterdam	Amsterdam, Virginia	
Amsterdam	New Amsterdam, Indiana	
Amsterdam	New Amsterdam, Wisconsin	
Arnhem	Arnheim, Michigan	
Bergen (North Holland) or Bergen-op-Zoom	Bergenfield, New Jersey	may just have meant "hills"
Bergen (North Holland) or Bergen-op-Zoom	North Bergen, New Jersey	may just have meant "hills"
Borculo	Borculo, Michigan	
Breukelen	Brooklyn, New York	
Breda	Breda, Iowa	
Brielle	Brielle, New Jersey	
Delft	Delft, Minnesota	
Drenthe	Drenthe, Michigan	
Friesland	Friesland, Wisconsin	
Friesland	Vriesland, Michigan	
Gelderland	Guilderland, New York	
's-Gravenzande	Gravesend, New York	see also Gravesend, England
Groningen	Groningen, Minnesota	
Haarlem	Harlem, New York	
The Hague	Hague, New York	
The Hague	Hague, North Dakota	
Harlingen	Harlingen, New Jersey	
Harlingen	Harlingen, Texas	
Heemstede	Hempstead, New York	
Leiden	Leyden, Massachusetts	
Leiden	Leyden, New York	
Leiden	Leyden, Wisconsin	
Middelburg	Middleborough, Massachusetts	
Middelburg	Middleburgh, New York	
The Netherlands	Nederland, Texas	
Nijmegen	Nijmegen, North Carolina	
Noordeloos	Noordeloos, Michigan	
Oostburg	Oostburg, Wisconsin	
Overijssel	Overisel, Michigan	
Rotterdam	Rotterdam (town), New York	
Rotterdam	Rotterdam (CDP), New York	
South Holland (Zuid-Holland)	South Holland, Illinois	
Utrecht	New Utrecht, New York	
Venlo	Venlo, North Dakota	
Vlissingen	Flushing, New York	
Zeeland	Zeeland, Michigan	
Zeeland	Zeeland, North Dakota	
Zutphen	Zutphen, Michigan	
Zwolle	Zwolle, Louisiana	

== Norway ==
Place	Namesake	Notes
Arendal	Arendal Township, Minnesota	
Aurdal	Aurdal Township, Minnesota	
Bergen	Bergen, New Jersey	may be Bergen op Zoom, Netherlands
Bergen	Bergen, New York	
Bygland	Bygland Township, Minnesota	
Dovre	Dovray, Minnesota	
Drammen	Drammen, Wisconsin	
Eidsvoll	Eidsvold Township, Minnesota	
Folden	Folden Township, Minnesota	
Fossum, Telemark	Fossum Township, Minnesota	
Fron	Frohn Township, Minnesota	
Hamar	Hamar, North Dakota	
Hammerfest	Hammerfest, North Dakota	
Heddal	Hitterdal, Minnesota	
Hoffland	Hovland, Minnesota	
Kongsberg	Kongsberg, North Dakota	
Lier, Buskerud	Leer, Michigan	
Nedstrand	Nerstrand, Minnesota	
Norway	Norway, Maine	
Norway	Norway, Illinois	
Norum Parish, Vestland	Norum, North Dakota	
Oslo	Oslo, Minnesota	
Paulsbo (a farm)	Poulsbo, Washington	
Sandnes	Sandnes Township, Minnesota	
Solum	New Solum Township, Minnesota	
Solør	Soler Township, Minnesota	
Stavanger	Stavanger, Illinois	
Sundal	Sundal Township, Minnesota	
Trondheim (formerly Nidaros)	Nidaros Township, Minnesota	
Trysil	Trysil, North Dakota	
Tynset	Tynsid Township, Minnesota	

== Pakistan ==
Place	Namesake	Notes
Kalat	Kelat, Kentucky	T. J. Smith, local school teacher, suggested the name of the capital of Balochistan when asked for a unique name
Lahore	Lahore, Virginia	

== Palestine ==
Place	Namesake	Notes
Palestine	Palestine, Illinois	The city of Palestine, Texas was named after Palestine, Illinois.
Palestine	Palestine, Ohio	
Palestine	East Palestine, Ohio	Named "East Palestine" because another Palestine in Ohio was already incorporated.

For cities in Palestinian territory, see the Ancient world section below.

== Panama ==
Place	Namesake	Notes
Colón	Colon, Michigan	
Panama City	Panama City, Florida	
Portobelo, Colón	Portobello, Maryland	

== Peru ==
Place	Namesake	Notes
Callao	Callao, Utah	
Callao	Callao, Missouri	
Cerro de Pasco	Pasco, Washington	
Cusco	Cuzco, Indiana	
Lima	Lima, Ohio	
Peru	Peru, Nebraska	
Peru	Peru, Illinois	
Peru	Peru, New York	
Peru	Peru, Indiana	
Peru	Peru, Kansas	
Peru	Peru, Pennsylvania	
Peru	Peru, Vermont	
Peru	Peru, Maine	
Peru	Peru, Iowa	
Peru	Peru, West Virginia	
Peru	Peru, Massachusetts	
Peru	Peru Township, Morrow County, Ohio	

== Philippines ==
Place	Namesake	Notes
Manila	Manila, Arkansas	
Manila	Manila, Utah	
Pateros	Pateros, Washington	

== Poland ==
Place	Namesake	Notes
Częstochowa	Cestohowa, Texas	
Elbląg (German: Elbing)	Elbing, Kansas	
Gdańsk (German: Danzig)	Danzig, North Dakota	
Gniezno	Gnesen Township, Minnesota	
Kłodzko (German: Glatz)	New Glatz, Maryland	
Kraków	Krakow, Wisconsin	
Lublin	Lublin, Wisconsin	
Miasteczko Krajeńskie (German: Friedheim)	Friedheim, Missouri	
Opole	Opole, Minnesota	
Poznań (German: Posen)	Posen, Illinois	
Poznań (German: Posen)	Posen, Michigan	
Radom	Radom, Illinois	
Szczecin (German: Stettin)	Stettin, Wisconsin	
Tarnów	Tarnov, Nebraska	
Toruń	Torun, Wisconsin	
Warsaw	Warsaw, Illinois	
Warsaw	Warsaw, Indiana	
Warsaw	Warsaw, Missouri	
Warsaw	Warsaw, Minnesota	
Warsaw	Warsaw, New York	
Wrocław (German: Breslau)	Breslau, Texas	
Poland	Poland, Herkimer County, New York	There are several U.S. places named Poland, but this is the only one named after the country. The rest are named after people, Poland, Ohio (named after a person), or in Poland, Maine's very unusual case, a song.

== Portugal ==
Place	Namesake	Notes
Lisbon	Lisbon, Connecticut	
Lisbon	Lisbon, Florida	
Lisbon	Lisbon, Illinois	
Lisbon	Lisbon, Indiana	
Lisbon	Lisbon, Iowa	
Lisbon	Lisbon, Louisiana	
Lisbon	Lisbon, Maine	
Lisbon	Lisbon, Maryland	
Lisbon	Lisbon, Missouri	
Lisbon	Lisbon, New Hampshire	
Lisbon	Lisbon, New York	
Lisbon	Lisbon, North Dakota	
Lisbon	Lisbon, Columbiana County, Ohio	
Lisbon	Lisbon, Clark County, Ohio	
Lisbon	Lisbon, Waukesha County, Wisconsin	
Lisbon	Lisbon, Juneau County, Wisconsin	
Lisbon	New Lisbon, Henry County, Indiana	
Lisbon	New Lisbon, Randolph County, Indiana	
Lisbon	New Lisbon, New Jersey	
Lisbon	New Lisbon, New York	
Lisbon	New Lisbon, Wisconsin	

== Romania ==
Place	Namesake	Notes
Transylvania	Transylvania County, North Carolina	

== Russia ==
Place	Namesake	Notes
Arkhangelsk	Sitka, Alaska	original name of Sitka was New Arkhangelsk
Borodino	Borodino, New York	named for the Battle of Borodino
Moscow Kremlin	Kremlin, Oklahoma	
Liebental (Lubonironvka)	Liebenthal, Kansas	Volga German settlement
Marks (Katharinenstadt)	Catharine, Kansas	Volga German settlement
Moscow	Moscow, Alabama (Lamar County)	
Moscow	Moscow, Alabama (Marengo County)	
Moscow	Moscow, Arkansas	
Moscow	Moscow, Idaho	Biggest settlement with this name in US
Moscow	Moscow, Indiana	
Moscow	Moscow, Iowa	Was referenced by Boris Akunin in one of his works
Moscow	Moscow, Kansas	The name was assiged by a mistake
Moscow	Moscow, Kentucky	
Moscow	Moscow, Maine	Had various Cold War-era installations
Moscow	Moscow, Michigan	
Moscow	Moscow, Mississippi	
Moscow	Moscow Mills, Missouri	Became the site of now de-classified contamination in 1970's
Moscow	Leicester, New York	Earlier known as Moscow, renamed in 1917
Moscow	Moscow Mills, Ohio	
Moscow	Moscow, Ohio	
Moscow	Moscow, Pennsylvania	
Moscow	Moscow, Tennessee	Founder was a Confederate representative to the Russian Emperor
Moscow	Moscow, Texas	
Moscow	Moscow, Vermont	
Moscow	Moscow, Wisconsin	
Obermunjor (Kriwowskoje)	Munjor, Kansas	Volga German settlement
Pfeifer (Gnilushka)	Pfeifer, Kansas	Volga German settlement
Russia	Russia, Ohio	
Saint Petersburg	St. Petersburg, Florida	The name was decided by a coin flip
Schoenchen (Paninskaja)	Schoenchen, Kansas	Volga German settlement
Sovetsk, Kaliningrad Oblast	Tilsit, Missouri	

== Saudi Arabia ==
Place	Namesake	Notes
Mecca	Mecca, California	
Mecca	Mecca, Ohio	
Medina	Medina, Ohio	
Medina	Medina, Minnesota	

== Serbia ==
Place	Namesake	Notes
Belgrade	Belgrade, Maine	
Belgrade	Belgrade, Montana	
Belgrade	Belgrade, Missouri	
Belgrade	Belgrade, Nebraska	

== Singapore ==
Place	Namesake	Notes
Singapore	Singapore, Michigan	

== Slovakia ==
Place	Namesake	Notes
Nitra	Nitra, Georgia	
Slovak	Slovak, Arkansas	Named after the country.

== Slovenia ==
Place	Namesake	Notes
Idrija	New Idria, California	
Travnik, Loški Potok	Traunik, Michigan	

== South Africa ==
Place	Namesake	Notes
Johannesburg	Johannesburg, California	
Kimberley, Northern Cape	Kimberly, Missouri	
Ladysmith, KwaZulu-Natal	Ladysmith, Virginia	
Pretoria	Pretoria, Georgia	
Randburg	Randsburg, California	

== Spain ==
Place	Namesake	Notes
A Coruña	Corunna, Michigan	
Aledo, Murcia	Aledo, Illinois	chosen from a geographical dictionary
Alhambra (a building)	Alhambra, California	
Alhambra (a building)	Alhambra, Illinois	
Almadén	New Almaden, California	
Altura, Castellón	Altura, Minnesota	
Ávila	Avilla, Indiana	
Barcelona	Barcelona, New York	
Cádiz	Cadiz, Indiana	
Cádiz	Cadiz, Kentucky	
Cádiz	Cadiz, Ohio	
Cartagena	Carthagena, Ohio	
Córdoba, Andalusia	Cordova, Nebraska	
Galisteo, Cáceres, Extremadura	Galisteo, New Mexico	
Granada	Granada, Minnesota	
Iberia	Iberia, Minnesota	
Iberia	Iberia, Missouri	
Iberia	Iberia, Ohio	
Iberia	New Iberia, Louisiana	
Laredo, Cantabria	Laredo, Texas	
León	Leon, New York	
León	Leon, Oklahoma	
Loja, Granada	Loxa, Illinois	
Madrid	Madrid, Alabama	
Madrid	Madrid, Colorado	
Madrid	Madrid, Maine	
Madrid	Madrid, Nebraska	
Madrid	Madrid, New Mexico	
Madrid	Madrid, New York	
Madrid	New Madrid, Missouri	
Málaga	Malaga, New Jersey	
Málaga	Malaga, New Mexico	
Mahón	Port Mahon, Delaware	
Oviedo	Oviedo, Florida	
Palos de la Frontera	Palos Park, Illinois	
Segovia	Segovia, Texas	
Seville	Seville, Florida	
Seville	Seville, Ohio	
Toledo	Toledo, Ohio	
Valencia	Valencia, New Mexico	
Valencia	Valencia, Pennsylvania	
Valencia	Valencia West, Arizona	
Valencia	Valencia, California	
Zaragoza	Saragossa, Alabama	

== Sudan ==
Place	Namesake	Notes
Dongola	Dongola, Illinois	
Khartoum	Khartoum, California	
Sudan	Sudan, Texas	
Wadi Halfa	Halfa, Iowa	

== Sweden ==
Place	Namesake	Notes
Alsen	Alsen, South Dakota	
Älvsborg fortress	Elsinboro Township, New Jersey	
Arboga	Arboga, California	
Borgholm	Borgholm Township, Minnesota	
Boxholm	Boxholm, Iowa	
Dannemora	Dannemora, New York	
Falun	Falun Township, Minnesota	
Forsby	Forsby, North Dakota	
Gothenburg	Gothenburg, Nebraska	
Gävle	Galva, Illinois	
Kalmar	Calmar, Iowa	
Karlstad	Karlstad, Minnesota	
Karlsborg	Carlsborg, Washington	
Linsell	Linsell Township, Minnesota	
Lund	Lund, Wisconsin	
Malmö	Malmo, Nebraska	
Malung	Malung Township, Minnesota	
Mora	Mora, Minnesota	
Nora	Nora, Indianapolis, Indiana	
Ronneby	Ronneby, Minnesota	
Skåne	Skanee, Michigan	
Stockholm	Stockholm, New York	
Sweden	Sweden, Maine	
Sweden	Sweden, New York	
Taberg	Taberg, New York	
Uppsala	Upsala, Minnesota	

== Switzerland ==
Place	Namesake	Notes
Altdorf	Altorf, Illinois	
Bern	Berne, Indiana	
Bern	New Bern, North Carolina	
Geneva	Geneva, Idaho	
Geneva	Geneva, Illinois	
Geneva	Geneva, New York	
Geneva	Geneva, Pennsylvania	
Geneva	Geneva Lake, Wisconsin	
Geneva	Lake Geneva, Wisconsin	
Glarus	New Glarus, Wisconsin	
Hallau	Hallam, Nebraska	clerical error by post office changed the proposed name
Interlaken	Interlaken, California	
Kloten	Kloten, Wisconsin	
Langnau im Emmental	Langnau, Kentucky	
Lausanne	Lausanne Township, Pennsylvania	
Lenzburg	Lenzburg, Illinois	
Lucerne	Lucerne, Indiana	
Maienfeld	Mayfield, Wisconsin	
Metzerlen-Mariastein	Maria Stein, Ohio	
Neuchâtel	Neuchatel, Kansas	
Rütli	Gruetli-Laager, Tennessee	
Switzerland	Switzerland County, Indiana	
Vevey	Vevay, Indiana	
Winterthur	Winterthur, Delaware	
Zurich	Zurich, Kansas	

== Syria ==
For cities in Syria, see the Ancient world section below.

== Tunisia ==
For cities in Tunisia, see the Ancient world section below.

== Turkey ==
For more cities in Turkey, see the Ancient world section below.

Place	Namesake	Notes
Ankara	Angora, Minnesota	

== Ukraine ==
Place	Namesake	Notes
Balta	Balta, North Dakota	
Kyiv	Kief, North Dakota	
Odesa	Odessa, Delaware	
Odesa	Odessa, Texas	
Odesa	Odessa, Washington	
Selz (now Lymanske)	Selz, North Dakota (Emmons County)	
Sevastopol	Sebastopol, California	
Sevastopol	Sebastopol, Michigan	
Sevastopol	Sevastopol, Wisconsin	The town clerk incorrectly registered a "v" instead of a "b" and it was never changed
Straßburg (now Kuchurhan, Rozdilna Raion)	Strasburg, North Dakota	Straßburg was named after the city in Alsace

== United Kingdom ==
=== British Overseas Territories ===
Place	Namesake	Notes
Longwood, Saint Helena	Longwood, Missouri	Place where Napoleon lived during his second exile.

=== Crown Dependencies ===
Place	Namesake	Notes
Saint Clement, Jersey	Clements, Maryland	

=== England ===
Place	Namesake	Notes
Abingdon-on-Thames, Oxfordshire	Abingdon, Maryland	
Acton, London	Acton, Maine	
Alton, Hampshire	Alton, New Hampshire	
Amesbury, Wiltshire	Amesbury, Massachusetts	
Great and Little Amwell, Hertfordshire	East Amwell Township, New Jersey	
Andover, Hampshire	Andover, Massachusetts	
Ashburnham, East Sussex	Ashburnham, Massachusetts	
Ashton	Ashton, South Dakota	needs disambiguation
Aston, Oxfordshire	Aston Township, Pennsylvania	
Attleborough, Norfolk	Attleboro, Massachusetts	
Barnstaple, Devon	Barnstable, Massachusetts	
Barton-upon-Humber, Lincolnshire	Barton, Maryland	
Bath, Somerset	Bath, Maine	
Bath, Somerset	Bath, New York	
Battle, East Sussex	Battle, Maryland	
Beddington, Greater London	Beddington, Maine	
Bedminster, Bristol	Bedminster, New Jersey	
Beenham, Berkshire	Beenham, New Mexico	
Berwick-upon-Tweed, Northumberland	Berwick, Maine	
Beverley, East Riding of Yorkshire	Beverly, Massachusetts	
Bexley, Greater London	Bexley, Ohio	
Bideford, Devon	Biddeford, Maine	
Billericay, Essex	Billerica, Massachusetts	
Birmingham, West Midlands	Birmingham, Alabama	
Birmingham, West Midlands	Birmingham, Iowa	
Birmingham, West Midlands	Birmingham, Michigan	
Birmingham, West Midlands	Birmingham, Missouri	
Blenheim Palace, Oxfordshire	Blenheim, South Carolina	
Boothby, Lincolnshire	Boothbay, Maine	
Boston, Lincolnshire	Boston, Massachusetts	There are several towns and cities named Boston in the US, but this is the only one named after the one in England. All the others were named after this city or a person named Boston.
Bowdon, Greater Manchester	Bowdon, North Dakota	
Boxford, Suffolk	Boxford, Massachusetts	
Bradford, West Yorkshire	Bradford, Massachusetts	
Braintree, Essex	Braintree, Massachusetts	
Brampton, Carlisle, Cumbria	Brampton, Michigan	
Brentford, Greater London	Branford, Connecticut	
Brentwood, Essex	Brentwood, California	
Brentwood, Essex	Brentwood, New Hampshire	
Brentwood, Essex	Brentwood, New York	
Bridgwater, Somerset	Bridgewater Township, New Jersey	
Bridgwater, Somerset	Bridgewater, Massachusetts	Taunton and Bridgewater in Massachusetts are about 8.5 miles (13.7 km) apart, which is the same separation as Taunton and Bridgwater in Somerset.
Bridlington, East Riding of Yorkshire	Burlington, New Jersey	
Brighton, East Sussex	Brighton, Alabama	
Brighton, East Sussex	New Brighton, Pennsylvania	
Brimfield, Herefordshire	Brimfield, Massachusetts	
Brinklow, Warwickshire	Brinklow, Maryland	
Bristol	Bristol, Tennessee	
Bristol	Bristol, Indiana	
Bromley, Greater London	Bromley, Kentucky	
Broseley, Shropshire	Broseley, Missouri	
Brunswick (Hove), East Sussex	Brunswick, Missouri	
Buckingham, Buckinghamshire	Buckingham, Pennsylvania	
Bude, Cornwall	Bude, Mississippi	
Burton upon Trent, Staffordshire	Burton, Illinois	
Bury, Greater Manchester	Woodbury, New Jersey	
Buxton, Norfolk	Buxton, Maine	
Calne, Wiltshire	Caln Township, Pennsylvania	
Cambridge, Cambridgeshire	Cambridge, Massachusetts	
Canterbury, Kent	Canterbury, Connecticut	
Carlisle, Cumbria	Carlisle, Pennsylvania	
Chalfont St Giles, Buckinghamshire	Chalfont, Pennsylvania	
Chatham, Kent	Chatham, Massachusetts	
Chatsworth, Derbyshire	Chatsworth, Illinois	
Chelmsford, Essex	Chelmsford, Massachusetts	
Chelsea, London	Chelsea, Massachusetts	
Cheltenham, Gloucestershire	Cheltenham, Maryland	
Chester, Cheshire	Chester, Illinois	
Chesterfield, Derbyshire	Chesterfield Township, New Jersey	
Chichester, West Sussex	Upper Chichester Township, Pennsylvania	
Chilham/Chilham Castle, Kent	Chillum, Maryland	
Chilmark, Wiltshire	Chilmark, Massachusetts	
Chipping Barnet, Greater London	Barnet, Vermont	
Claremont (country house), Surrey	Claremont, Virginia	
Clifton, Bristol	Clifton, North Dakota	
Coalville, Leicestershire	Coalville, Utah	
Cobham, Surrey	Cobham, Albemarle County, Virginia	
Colchester, Essex	Colchester, Connecticut	
Coventry, West Midlands	Coventry, Connecticut	
Crewe, Cheshire	Crewe, Virginia	
Croydon, Greater London	Croydon, New Hampshire	
Danbury, Essex	Danbury, Connecticut	
Danby, North Yorkshire	Danby, Vermont	
Darlington, County Durham	Darlington, Indiana	
Dartmouth, Devon	Dartmouth, Massachusetts	
Deal, Kent	Deal, New Jersey	
Dedham, Essex	Dedham, Massachusetts	
Deptford, Greater London	Deptford Township, New Jersey	
Derby, Derbyshire	Derby, Connecticut	
Derby, Derbyshire	Derby, Vermont	
Dorchester, Dorset	Dorchester, Boston, Massachusetts	
Dover, Kent	Dover, Delaware	
Dover, Kent	Dover, New Jersey	
Dunstable, Bedfordshire	Dunstable, Massachusetts	
Durham, County Durham	Durham, Connecticut	
Duxbury Hall, Lancashire	Duxbury, Massachusetts	
East Ardsley, West Yorkshire	Ardsley, New York	
Easton Neston, Northamptonshire	Easton, Pennsylvania	
Easton Neston, Northamptonshire	Easton, Massachusetts	
East Raynham, Norfolk	Raynham, Massachusetts	
Edgeley, Greater Manchester	Edgeley, North Dakota	
Edgmond, Shropshire	Edgmont Township, Pennsylvania	
Enfield Town, Greater London	Enfield, Connecticut	
Epping, Essex	Epping, New Hampshire	
Epsom, Surrey	Epsom, New Hampshire	
Epworth, Lincolnshire	Epworth, Iowa	
Eton, Berkshire	Eton, Georgia	
Evesham, Worcestershire	Evesham Township, New Jersey	
Exeter, Devon	Exeter, New Hampshire	
Falmouth, Cornwall	Falmouth, Massachusetts	
Farmington, Gloucestershire	Farmington, Connecticut	
Farnham, Surrey	Farnham, Virginia	
Foxhall, Suffolk	Foxton, Colorado	
Framlingham, Suffolk	Framingham, Massachusetts	
Glastonbury, Somerset	Glastonbury, Connecticut	
Gloucester, Gloucestershire	Gloucester, Massachusetts	
Gravesend, Kent	Gravesend, New York	see also 's-Gravenzande, Netherlands
Great Barrington, Gloucestershire	Great Barrington, Massachusetts	
Great Wilbraham, Cambridgeshire	Wilbraham, Massachusetts	
Great Yarmouth, Norfolk	Yarmouth, Massachusetts	
Greenwich, Greater London	Greenwich, Connecticut	
Groton, Suffolk	Groton, Massachusetts	
Guildford, Surrey	Guilford, Connecticut	
Much Hadham and Little Hadham, Hertfordshire	Haddam, Connecticut	
Hadleigh, Suffolk	Hadley, Massachusetts	
Halifax, West Yorkshire	Halifax, Massachusetts	
Hampstead, Greater London	Hampstead, New Hampshire	
Hampton, London	Hampton, New Hampshire	
Harpswell, Lincolnshire	Harpswell, Maine	
Harrogate, North Yorkshire	Harrogate, Tennessee	
Harwich, Essex	Harwich Port, Massachusetts	
Hastings, East Sussex	Hastings-on-Hudson, New York	
Hatfield, Hertfordshire	Hatfield, Massachusetts	needs disambiguation
Haverhill, Suffolk	Haverhill, Massachusetts	
Haworth, West Yorkshire	Haworth, New Jersey	
Hemel Hempstead, Hertfordshire	Hempstead, New York	
Hereford, Herefordshire	Hereford, South Dakota	named for the breed of cattle, which originated in Herefordshire
Hertford, Hertfordshire	Hartford, Connecticut	
Highgate, Greater London	Highgate, Vermont	
Hillington, Norfolk	Hillington, Wisconsin	neighborhood in Madison, Wisconsin
Hingham, Norfolk	Hingham, Massachusetts	
Huntingdon, Cambridgeshire	Huntingdon, Pennsylvania	
Ilchester, Somerset	Ilchester, Maryland	
Ipswich, Suffolk	Ipswich, Massachusetts	
Islip, Northamptonshire	Islip, New York	
Kennett, Cambridgeshire	Kennett Square, Pennsylvania	
Kenilworth, Warwickshire	Killingworth, Connecticut	
Kensington, Greater London	Kensington, Maryland	
Keswick, Cumbria	Keswick, California	
Kimbolton, Cambridgeshire	Kimbolton, Ohio	
King's Lynn, Norfolk	Lynn, Massachusetts	
Kingston upon Hull, East Riding of Yorkshire	Hull, Massachusetts	
Lancaster, Lancashire	Lancaster, Pennsylvania	
Langley, Berkshire	Langley, South Carolina	
Laxton, Nottinghamshire	Lexington, Massachusetts	
Leamington Spa, Warwickshire	Leamington, Utah	
Leeds, West Yorkshire	Leeds, Alabama	
Leominster, Herefordshire	Leominster, Massachusetts	
Lewes, East Sussex	Lewes, Delaware	
Limington, Somerset	Limington, Maine	
Lincoln, Lincolnshire	Lincoln, Massachusetts	
Lichfield, Staffordshire	Litchfield, Connecticut	
Liverpool, Merseyside	Liverpool, New York	
London	New London, Connecticut	
London	London, Kentucky	
London	New London, Missouri	
London	New London, Wisconsin	
Longton, Staffordshire	Longton, Kansas	
Ludlow, Shropshire	Ludlow, Massachusetts	
Lyme Regis, Dorset	Lyme, Connecticut	
Maidstone, Kent	Maidstone, Vermont	
Maldon, Essex	Malden, Massachusetts	
Malvern, Worcestershire	Malverne, New York	
Malvern, Worcestershire	Malvern Hill, Virginia	Site of The Battle of Malvern Hill, an American Civil war battle
Malvern, Worcestershire	Malvern, Pennsylvania	
Manchester	North Manchester, Indiana	
Manchester	Manchester, Missouri	
Manchester	Manchester, New Hampshire	
Mansfield, Nottinghamshire	Mansfield Township, New Jersey	
Margate, Kent	Margate City, New Jersey	
Marlborough, Wiltshire	Marlborough, Massachusetts	
Marlow, Buckinghamshire	Marlow, New Hampshire	
Matfield, Kent	Matfield Green, Kansas	
Matlock, Derbyshire	Matlock, Iowa	
Mendham, Suffolk	Mendon, Massachusetts	
Meriden, West Midlands	Meriden, Connecticut	
Middlesbrough, North Yorkshire	Middlesboro, Kentucky	
Middlesex, London	West Middlesex, Pennsylvania	
Milford	Milford, Connecticut	needs disambiguation
Modbury, Devon	Madbury, New Hampshire	
Needham Market, Suffolk	Needham, Massachusetts	
Nether Winchendon, Buckinghamshire	Winchendon, Massachusetts	
Newark-on-Trent, Nottinghamshire	Newark, New Jersey	
Newbury, Berkshire	Newbury, Massachusetts	
Newcastle upon Tyne, Tyne and Wear	Newcastle, Texas	
Newcastle upon Tyne, Tyne and Wear	New Castle, Pennsylvania	
Newmarket, Suffolk	Newmarket, New Hampshire	
Newstead Abbey, Nottinghamshire	Newstead, New York	
Northampton, Northamptonshire	Northampton, Massachusetts	
Norton, Oxfordshire	Norton, Massachusetts	needs disambiguation
Norwich, Norfolk	Norwich, Connecticut	
Nottingham, Nottinghamshire	Nottingham, New Jersey	
Oakham, Rutland	Oakham, Massachusetts	
Oldham, Greater Manchester	Oldham, South Dakota	
Olney, Buckinghamshire	Olney, Maryland	
Oxford, Oxfordshire	Oxford, Mississippi	
Oxford, Oxfordshire	Oxford, Ohio	
Penn, Buckinghamshire	Penn, North Dakota	
Petersham, London	Petersham, Massachusetts	
Plaistow	Plaistow, New Hampshire	needs disambiguation
Plymouth, Devon	Plymouth, Massachusetts	
Plymouth, Devon	Plymouth, Indiana	
Plymouth, Devon	Plymouth, Minnesota	
Pontefract, West Yorkshire	Pomfret, Connecticut	
Portland, Dorset	Portland, Indiana	
Portland, Dorset	Portland, Maine	
Portland, Dorset	Portland, Oregon	
Portsmouth, Hampshire	Portsmouth, Virginia	
Preston, Lancashire	Preston, Connecticut	
Raynham, Norfolk	Raynham, Massachusetts	
Reading, Berkshire	Reading, Pennsylvania	
Reigate, Surrey	Ryegate, Vermont	
Reydon, Suffolk	Reydon, Oklahoma	
Richmond, London	Richmond, Virginia	
Ridley, Cheshire	Ridley Park, Pennsylvania	
Ripon, North Yorkshire	Ripon, Wisconsin	
Rochdale, Greater Manchester	Rochdale Village, Queens New York	
Rochester, Kent	Rochester, Massachusetts	
Rowley, East Riding of Yorkshire	Rowley, Massachusetts	
Royal Tunbridge Wells, Kent	Tunbridge, North Dakota	
Rugby, Warwickshire	Rugby, North Dakota	
Runnymede, Surrey	Runnymede, Kansas	
Ryde, Isle of Wight	Ryde, California	
Rye, East Sussex	Rye, New Hampshire	
St Albans, Hertfordshire	St. Albans, Vermont	
Salisbury, Wiltshire	Salisbury, Maryland	
Sandown, Isle of Wight	Sandown, New Hampshire	
Sandwich, Kent	Sandwich, Massachusetts	
Scarborough, North Yorkshire	Scarborough, Maine	
Shadwell, Greater London	Shadwell, Virginia	
Sheffield, South Yorkshire	Sheffield, Massachusetts	
Shrewsbury, Shropshire	Shrewsbury, Massachusetts	
Skelton	Skelton, West Virginia	needs disambiguation
Smithfield, London	Smithfield, Rhode Island	
Somerset	Somerset County, Pennsylvania	
Sotterley, Suffolk	Sotterley (Hollywood, Maryland)	
Southampton, Hampshire	Southampton, New York	
South Norwood, Greater London	Norwood, Massachusetts	
Southwark, London	Southwark, Philadelphia, Pennsylvania	
Springfield, Essex	Springfield, Massachusetts	
Stamford, Lincolnshire	Stamford, Connecticut	
Staplehurst, Kent	Staplehurst, Nebraska	
Stockbridge, Hampshire	Stockbridge, Massachusetts	
Stockport, Greater Manchester	Stockport, Ohio	
Stockton-on-Tees, County Durham	Stockton Springs, Maine	
Stourbridge, West Midlands	Sturbridge, Massachusetts	
Stow	Stow, Massachusetts	needs disambiguation
Stratford-upon-Avon, Warwickshire	Stratford, Connecticut	
Sudbury, Suffolk	Sudbury, Massachusetts	
Sunbury-on-Thames, Greater London	Sunbury, Pennsylvania	
Sutton Scarsdale, Derbyshire	Scarsdale, New York	
Taunton, Somerset	Taunton, Massachusetts	Taunton and Bridgewater in Massachusetts are about 8.5 miles (13.7 km) apart, which is the same separation as Taunton and Bridgwater in Somerset.
Tewkesbury, Gloucestershire	Tewksbury, Massachusetts	
Thornbury, Gloucestershire	Thornbury Township, Pennsylvania	
Teignmouth, Devon	Tinmouth, Vermont	
Tisbury, Wiltshire	Tisbury, Massachusetts	
Tolland, Somerset	Tolland, Connecticut	
Toppesfield, Essex	Topsfield, Massachusetts	
Topsham, Devon	Topsham, Maine	
Trafford, Greater Manchester	Trafford, Pennsylvania	
Truro, Cornwall	Truro, Massachusetts	
Turton, Lancashire	Turton, South Dakota	
Ventnor, Isle of Wight	Ventnor City, New Jersey	
Wakefield, West Yorkshire	Wakefield, New Hampshire	
Wallingford, Oxfordshire	Wallingford, Pennsylvania	
Wantage, Oxfordshire	Wantage Township, New Jersey	
Wareham, Dorset	Wareham, Massachusetts	
Warminster, Wiltshire	Warminster, Pennsylvania	
Warwick, Warwickshire	Warwick, Pennsylvania	
Wellingborough, Northamptonshire	Willingboro Township, New Jersey	
Wells, Somerset	Wells, Maine	
Wenham Magna, Suffolk	Wenham, Massachusetts	
Westminster, Greater London	Westminster, California	named for the Westminster Assembly
Weymouth, Dorset	Weymouth, Massachusetts	
Wickford, Essex	Wickford, Rhode Island	
Willoughby, Lincolnshire	Williba, Kentucky	
Wilmington, Kent	New Wilmington, Pennsylvania	
Wilmington, Kent	Wilmington, North Carolina	
Wilton, Wiltshire	Wilton, New Hampshire	
Wimbledon, London	Wimbledon, North Dakota	
Winchester, Hampshire	Winchester, Virginia	
Windsor, Berkshire	Windsor, Maine	
Woburn, Bedfordshire	Woburn, Massachusetts	
Woodstock, Oxfordshire	Woodstock, Alabama	
Woolwich, London	Woolwich, Maine	
Worcester, Worcestershire	Worcester, Massachusetts	
Wrentham, Suffolk	Wrentham, Massachusetts	
Wylam, Northumberland	Wylam, Alabama	neighbourhood of Birmingham, AL, also named after a place in England
Wymondham, Norfolk	Windham, Maine	
York, North Yorkshire	York, Pennsylvania	

=== Northern Ireland ===
Place	Namesake	Notes
Antrim, County Antrim	Antrim, Ohio	
Armagh	Armagh, Pennsylvania	
Belfast	Belfast, Maine	
Charlemont, County Armagh	Charlemont, Massachusetts	
Coleraine	Colerain, North Carolina	
Derry	Derry, New Hampshire	
Derry	Londonderry, New Hampshire	
Derry	Derry, New Mexico	
Derry	Londonderry, Guernsey County, Ohio	
Derry	Londonderry, Ross County, Ohio	
Derry	Derry, Pennsylvania	
Dungannon	Dungannon, Virginia	
Glenarm, County Antrim	Glenarm, Kentucky	
Lisburn	Lisburn, Pennsylvania	
Lurgan	Lurgan Township, Pennsylvania	
Newry	Newry, Maine	
Rostrevor, County Down	Rostraver Township, Pennsylvania	
Strabane	Straban Township, Pennsylvania	
Ulster	Ulster Township, Pennsylvania	

=== Scotland ===
Place	Namesake	Notes
Aberdeen	Aberdeen, Washington	
Aldie Castle, Kinross-shire	Aldie, Virginia	
Alloa	Alloway, New York	
Alloway	Alloway, Maryland	
Ancrum	Ancram, New York	
Ayr, Ayrshire	Mount Ayr, Iowa	
Bannockburn	Bannockburn, Illinois	
Bathgate, West Lothian	Bathgate, North Dakota	
Blair Atholl	Athol, Massachusetts	
Braemore, Highlands	Bremo Bluff, Virginia	
Caledonia, the Roman Empire's name for Scotland	Caledonia, Missouri Caledonia, Wisconsin	There are four places named Caledonia in Wisconsin.
Currie	Currie, Minnesota	
Dumbarton	Dunbarton, New Hampshire	
Dumfries	Dumfries, Virginia	
Dundee	Dundee, Florida	
Dunfermline	Dunfermline, Illinois	
Edinburgh	Edina, Minnesota	
Edinburgh	Edina, Missouri	
Edinburgh	Edinburg, Texas	
Elcho Castle	Elcho, Wisconsin	
Elderslie	Ellerslie, Maryland	
Elgin, Moray	Elgin, Minnesota	
Ettrick, Scottish Borders	Ettrick, Virginia	
Glamis Castle	Glamis, California	
Glasgow	Glasgow, Kentucky	
Glasgow	Glasgow, Missouri	
Glasgow	Glasgow, Virginia	
Glen Coe	Glencoe, Missouri	
Glencoe, Highland	Glencoe, Minnesota	
Glendale, Skye	Glendale, Utah	
Glenelg, Highland	Glenelg, Maryland	
Grampian Mountains	Grampian, Pennsylvania	
Gretna Green	Gretna, Louisiana	
Inverness	Inverness Township, Michigan	
Kelso, Scottish Borders	Kelso, Washington	
Kilmarnock	Kilmarnock, Virginia	
Kilsyth	Kilsyth, West Virginia	
Kilwinning	Kilwinning, Missouri	
Kinross	Kinross Charter Township, Michigan	
Lanark	Lanark, Illinois	
Leith	Leith, North Dakota	
Leven, Fife	Leven Township, Minnesota	
Linlithgow, West Lothian	Lithgow, New York	
Lochbuie, Mull	Lochbuie, Colorado	
Lochgelly, Fife	Lochgelly, West Virginia	
Loudoun, East Ayrshire	Loudoun County, Virginia	
Lower Largo	Largo, Maryland	
Melrose, Scottish Borders	Melrose, Massachusetts	
Montrose, Angus	Montrose, Minnesota	
Muirkirk, East Ayrshire	Muirkirk, Maryland	
Newburgh, Fife	Newburgh (city), New York	
Paisley, Renfrewshire	Paisley, Oregon	
Perth	Perth, New York	
Rothesay, Bute	Rothsay, Minnesota	
Rutherglen	Ruther Glen, Virginia	
Skibo Castle, Sutherland	Skibo, Minnesota	
Stirling	Mount Sterling, Kentucky	
Tantallon Castle, East Lothian	Tantallon, Maryland	
Upper Largo	Largo, Maryland	
Wanlockhead	Wanlock, Illinois	

=== Wales ===
Place	Namesake	Notes
Bala	Bala Cynwyd, Pennsylvania	
Bangor	Bangor, Maine	
Bangor	Bangor, New York	
Bangor	Bangor, Pennsylvania	
Brecon	Beacon, Iowa	
Caernarfon	Arvon Township, Michigan	
Caernarfon	Caernarvon Township, Pennsylvania	
Cardiff	Cardiff, Maryland	
Cynwyd	Bala Cynwyd, Pennsylvania	
Gwynedd	Upper Gwynedd Township	
Haverfordwest	Haverford, Pennsylvania	
Hawarden Castle	Hawarden, Iowa	
Lampeter	Lampeter, Pennsylvania	
Landore	Landore, Idaho	former mining town; now a ghost town
Llandovery	Landover, Maryland	
Milford Haven	Milford, Pennsylvania	
Nantmel	Nantmeal Village, Pennsylvania	
Narberth	Narberth, Pennsylvania	
New Radnor	Radnor, Pennsylvania	
Pembroke	Pembroke, Massachusetts	
Penrhyn Quarry	Penryn, California	
Swansea	Swansea, Massachusetts	
Wales	Wales, Utah	

== Uruguay ==
Place	Namesake	Notes
Montevideo	Montevideo, Minnesota	

== Uzbekistan ==
Place	Namesake	Notes
Samarkand	Samarcand, North Carolina	

== Ancient world ==
Cities that have namesakes because they are biblical or prominent in ancient history are in this section.

Place	Civilization	Modern location	Namesake	Notes
Aleppo	Halaf	Aleppo, Syria	Aleppo, Pennsylvania	
Antioch	Hellenistic	ruins near Antakya, Turkey	Antioch, California	
Antioch	Hellenistic	ruins near Antakya, Turkey	Antioch, Illinois	
Arbela	Assyrian	Erbil, Iraq	Arbela, Missouri	named for the Battle of Arbela, where Alexander decisively defeated the Persian Empire
Argos	Greek	Argos, Greece	Argos, Indiana	
Ashkelon	Canaanite	Ashkelon, Israel	Ascalon, Georgia	
Babylon	Babylonian	ruins at Hillah, Iraq	Babylon, New York	
Beersheba		Beersheba	Beersheba Springs, Tennessee	
Berea	Macedonian	Veria, Greece	Berea, Kentucky	
Bethesda	Judaean	Jerusalem, Israel	Bethesda, Maryland	
Bethany	Hebrew	al-Eizariya, West Bank	Bethany, Missouri	
Bethany	Hebrew	al-Eizariya, West Bank	Bethany, Oklahoma	
Bethany	Hebrew	al-Eizariya, West Bank	Bethany, Oregon	
Bethany	Hebrew	al-Eizariya, West Bank	Bethany, West Virginia	
Bethlehem	Hebrew	Bethlehem, West Bank	Bethlehem, Pennsylvania Bethlehem, Connecticut Bethlehem, Georgia ||	
Bethphage	Hebrew	Bethphage, Israel	Bethpage, New York	
Bozrah	Hebrew	Bouseira, Jordan	Bozrah, Connecticut	
Carthage	Punic, Berber	Carthage, Tunisia	Carthage, Missouri	
Carthage	Punic, Berber	Carthage, Tunisia	Carthage, Tennessee	Notes: Per the Carthage, Mississippi page, Carthage MS is named for Carthage, TN, and Carthage, TX is named for Carthage, MS... "Carthage[, Mississippi] was established in 1834, and became the county seat. The Harris family were early settlers, and named the town after their former home of Carthage, Tennessee." "When [Carthage, Texas] established in 1848, it was named after Carthage, Mississippi."
Carthage	Punic, Berber	Carthage, Tunisia	Carthage, Indiana	
Corinth (ancient)	Greek	Corinth, Greece	Corinth, Mississippi	
Damascus	Aramaean	Damascus, Syria	Damascus, Maryland	
Damascus	Aramaean	Damascus, Syria	Damascus, Virginia	
Delphi	Greek	Delphi, Greece	Delphi, Indiana	
Dothan	Hebrew	Tell Dothan – 10 km SW of Jenin, West Bank	Dothan, Alabama	
Egypt	Egyptian		Egypt, Wharton County, Texas	Genesis 42:1--3
Ekron	Philistine	Kibbutz Revadim, Israel	Ekron, Kentucky	
Emmaus	Hebrew	There are several candidates in modern Israel as the name is generic for "warm springs"	Emmaus, Pennsylvania	
Endor	Canaanite	Jezreel Valley	Indore, West Virginia	spelling error for the village where the Witch of Endor lived
Ephesus	Greek	3 km SW of Selçuk, Turkey	Ephesus, Georgia	
Galilee	Hebrew	Northern Israel and Southern Lebanon	New Galilee, Pennsylvania	
Gaza	Philistine	Gaza City, Gaza Strip	Gaza, New Hampshire	
Hebron	Hebrew	Hebron, West Bank	Hebron, Nebraska	
Hebron	Hebrew	Hebron, West Bank	Hebron, KentuckyHebron, Connecticut Hebron, North Dakota	
Herculaneum	Samnite	Ercolano, Campania, Italy	Herculaneum, Missouri	
Ikónion	Phrygian	Konya, Turkey	Iconium, Iowa	
Ithaca	Greek	Ithaca, Greece	Ithaca, New York	
Jericho	Natufian	Tell es-Sultan, West Bank	Jerico Springs, MO	
Jericho	Natufian	Tell es-Sultan, West Bank	Jericho, Vermont	
Jericho	Natufian	Tell es-Sultan, West Bank	Jericho, New York	
Jerusalem	Hebrew	Jerusalem, Israel	Jerusalem, New York	
Jerusalem	Hebrew	Jerusalem, Israel	Salem, Massachusetts	
Jerusalem	Hebrew	Jerusalem, Israel	Salem, Oregon	
Jaffa	Canaanite	Tel Aviv-Yafo, Israel	Joppa, Maryland	
Jaffa	Canaanite	Tel Aviv-Yafo, Israel	Joppa, Illinois	
Karnak	Egyptian	Luxor, Egypt	Karnak, Illinois	
Laurium	Greek	Laurium, Greece	Laurium, Michigan	
Marathon	Greek	Marathon, Greece	Marathon, New York	
Memphis	Egyptian	ruins near Mit Rahina, Egypt	Memphis, Missouri	
Memphis	Egyptian	ruins near Mit Rahina, Egypt	Memphis, Tennessee	
Mount Carmel			Carmel-by-the-Sea, California	
Mount Carmel			Carmel, Indiana	
Mycenae	Mycenaean Greece	11 km N of Argos, Greece	Mycenae, New York	
Nazareth	Hebrew	Nazareth, Israel	Nazareth, Pennsylvania Nazareth, Texas	
Nineveh	Neo-Assyrian	Mosul, Iraq	Nineveh, New York	
Palmyra	Amorite	Tadmur, Syria	Palmyra, New Jersey	
Pompeii	Oscan	Pompei, Italy	Pompeii, Michigan	
Philippi	Macedonian	near Filippoi, Greece	Philippi, Tennessee	
Rehoboth		Rehovot, Israel	Rehoboth Beach, Delaware	
Rehoboth		Rehovot, Israel	Rehoboth, Massachusetts	
Samaria	Canaanite	Samaria mountains, West Bank	Samaria, Indiana	
Sardis	Lydian	Sart, Turkey	Sardis, Alabama	
Sharon Plain			Sharon, Massachusetts	
Sharon Plain			Sharon, Pennsylvania	
Shiloh	Hebrew	Shiloh, West Bank	Shiloh, Georgia	
Shiloh	Hebrew	Shiloh, West Bank	Shiloh, New Jersey	
Shiloh	Hebrew	Shiloh, West Bank	Shiloh, Ohio	
Sidon	Phoenician	Sidon, Lebanon	Sidon, Mississippi	
Smyrna	Greek	İzmir, Turkey	Smyrna, Georgia	
Sparta	Greek	Sparta, Greece	Sparta, Georgia	
Sparta	Greek	Sparta, Greece	Sparta, Wisconsin	
Susa	Persian	Shush, Iran	Shushan, New York	
Swenett	Egyptian	Aswan	Syene, Wisconsin	
Syracuse	Greek	Syracuse, Italy	Syracuse, New York	
Taranto	Greek	Taranto, Italy	Tarentum, Pennsylvania	
Thebes	Egyptian	Luxor, Egypt	Thebes, Illinois	
Timonium	Egyptian	Antirhodos island, Alexandria harbor, Egypt	Timonium, Maryland	incomplete palace built by Mark Antony
Troy	(unknown)	Hisarlik, Turkey	Troy, Alabama	
Troy	(unknown)	Hisarlik, Turkey	Troy, Illinois	
Troy	(unknown)	Hisarlik, Turkey	Troy, Michigan	
Troy	(unknown)	Hisarlik, Turkey	Troy, Missouri	
Troy	(unknown)	Hisarlik, Turkey	Troy, New York	
Troy	(unknown)	Hisarlik, Turkey	Troy, Wisconsin	
Troy	(unknown)	Hisarlik, Turkey	East Troy, Wisconsin	
Tekoa	Hebrew	Tuqu', West Bank	Tekoa, Washington	
Tyre	Phoenician	Tyre, Lebanon	Tyre, New York	
Utica	Phoenician	Bizerte Governorate, Tunisia	Utica, New York	

== See also ==
- List of places named after people in the United States
- List of places named after places in the United States
- Lists of places by language of origin
  - List of place names of Czech origin in the United States
  - List of place names of Dutch origin in the United States
  - Locations in the United States with an English name
  - List of place names of French origin in the United States
  - List of Irish place names in other countries
  - List of place names of Scottish origin in the United States
  - List of place names of Spanish origin in the United States
  - List of Swedish place names in the United States
  - List of place names of Welsh origin in the United States
