= Krohns Lake =

Lake in Wisconsin, United States

- Location within Wisconsin Location within the United States
- Location: Kewaunee County, Wisconsin
- Coordinates: 44.583610°N 87.488699°W
- Primary inflows: springs
- Basin countries: United States
- Surface area: 21 acres (8.5 ha)
- Average depth: 21 ft (6.4 m)
- Max. depth: 38 ft (12 m)
- Surface elevation: 665 ft (203 m)

Krohns Lake, is a spring-fed lake southwest of Algoma, Wisconsin, in Kewaunee County. The lake is part of the Tri-Lakes Association, who are in charge of this lake, East Alaska Lake, and West Alaska Lake.

== Fish species ==
- Bluegill
- Brook trout
- Brown trout
- Largemouth bass
- Rainbow trout
