= Aleppo Township, Pennsylvania =

Aleppo Township is the name of two townships in the state of Pennsylvania, U.S.A.:

- Aleppo Township, Allegheny County, Pennsylvania
- Aleppo Township, Greene County, Pennsylvania

== See also ==
- Aleppo, Pennsylvania, in Greene County
