= Pictou (disambiguation) =

Pictou is a Canadian town in Nova Scotia.

Pictou may also refer to:

- Pictou County, Nova Scotia, one of Nova Scotia's 18 counties
- HMCS Pictou (K146), a Flower-class corvette
- Pictou, a coastal steamship, formerly USS Fahkee
- Pictou (federal electoral district), a federal electoral district in Nova Scotia
- Pictou (provincial electoral district), a provincial electoral district in Nova Scotia
- Pictou Academy, a secondary school in the town of Pictou
- Pictou, Colorado, a community in the United States
