= Rostok, Wisconsin =

- Unincorporated community
- Location within Wisconsin Location within the United States
- Coordinates: 44°30′06″N 87°30′05″W
- Country: United States
- State: Wisconsin
- County: Kewaunee
- Town: Pierce
- Elevation: 686 ft (209 m)
- Time zone: UTC-6 (Central (CST))
  - Summer (DST): UTC-5 (CDT)
- Area code: 920
- GNIS feature ID: 1572627

Rostok is an unincorporated community in the town of Pierce, Kewaunee County, Wisconsin, United States. It is on Wisconsin Highway 42, 3 miles (5 km) north of Kewaunee.

The community was named after a city in Bohemia.
