= West Alaska Lake =

Lake in Wisconsin, United States

- Location within Wisconsin Location within the United States
- Location: Kewaunee County, Wisconsin
- Coordinates: 44.540555°N 87.505365°W
- Basin countries: United States
- Surface area: 27 acres (11 ha)
- Average depth: 15 ft (4.6 m)
- Max. depth: 41 ft (12 m)
- Surface elevation: 696 ft (212 m)
- Settlements: Alaska, Wisconsin

West Alaska Lake, is a small lake in Central Kewaunee County, Wisconsin. The lake is home to bluegill, brook trout, largemouth bass and rainbow trout. The lake shares the area with its larger neighbor, East Alaska Lake because of that the lake is a popular fishing destination.
