= Alaska, Wisconsin =

- Unincorporated community
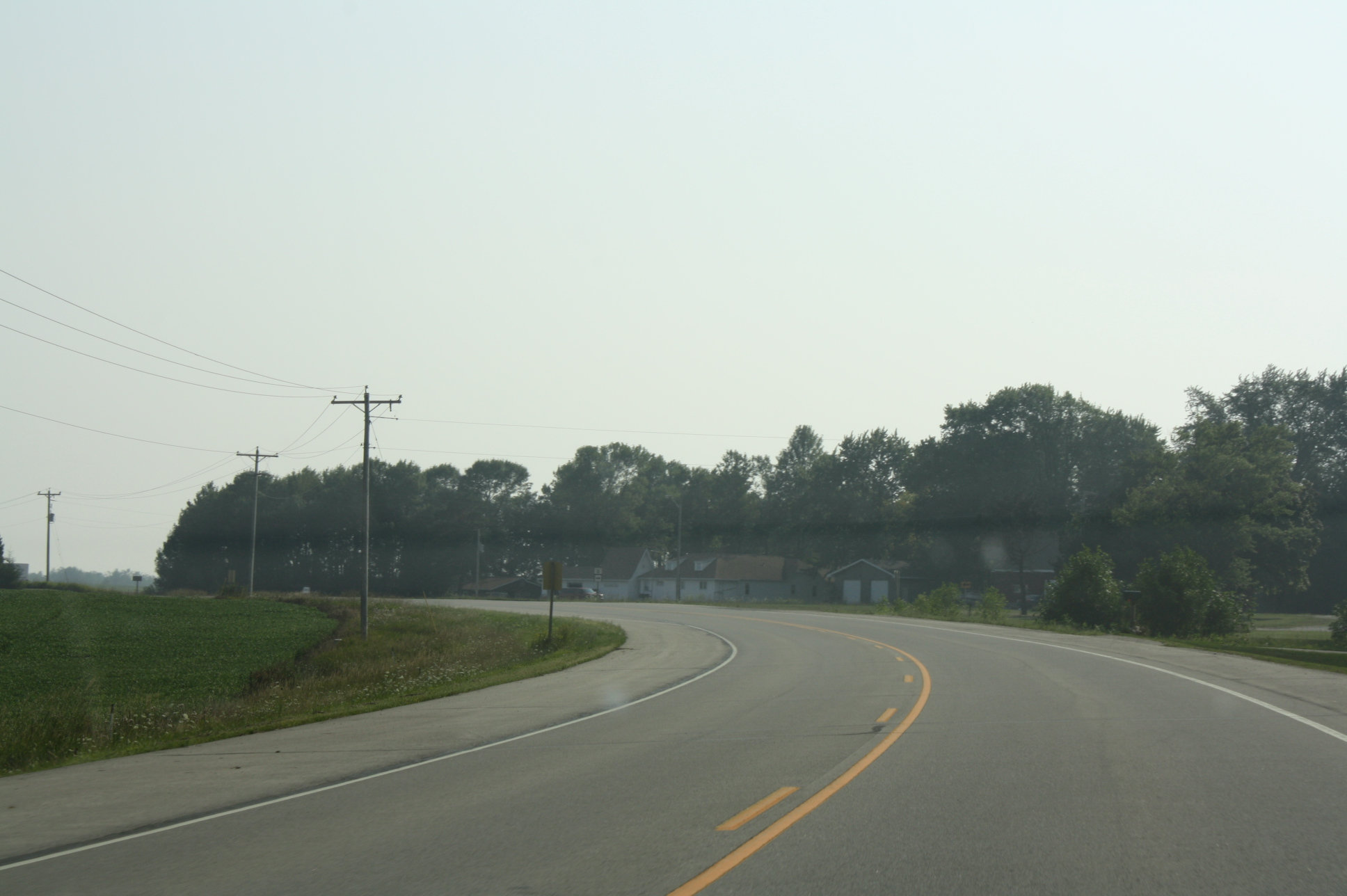
- Looking southeast along WIS 42

- Location within Wisconsin Location within the United States
- Coordinates: 44°32′26″N 87°30′04″W
- Country: United States
- State: Wisconsin
- County: Kewaunee
- Town: Pierce
- Elevation: 722 ft (220 m)
- Time zone: UTC-6 (Central (CST))
  - Summer (DST): UTC-5 (CDT)
- Area code: 920
- GNIS feature ID: 1560724

Alaska is an unincorporated community located on Wisconsin Highway 42 in the town of Pierce, Kewaunee County, Wisconsin, United States. Alaska falls between East Alaska Lake and West Alaska Lake and is an important tourist and fishing spot. As well as home to Troop 3 Alaska in the area, it is also home to the Alaskan Golf Club, a public course located on East Alaska Lake.

== Etymology ==
The community was named after the Alaska Territory, and was done so because the community's post office was established the same year that the United States acquired Alaska from Russia.

== History ==
Alaska was formed sometime between 1867 and 1870, with the United States’ purchase of Alaska occurring in 1867 opening of the post office occurring in 1870. Not much is known about the early history of Alaska, however. The historic schoolhouse in Alaska was opened in 1917, and is currently a private house.

== Gallery ==
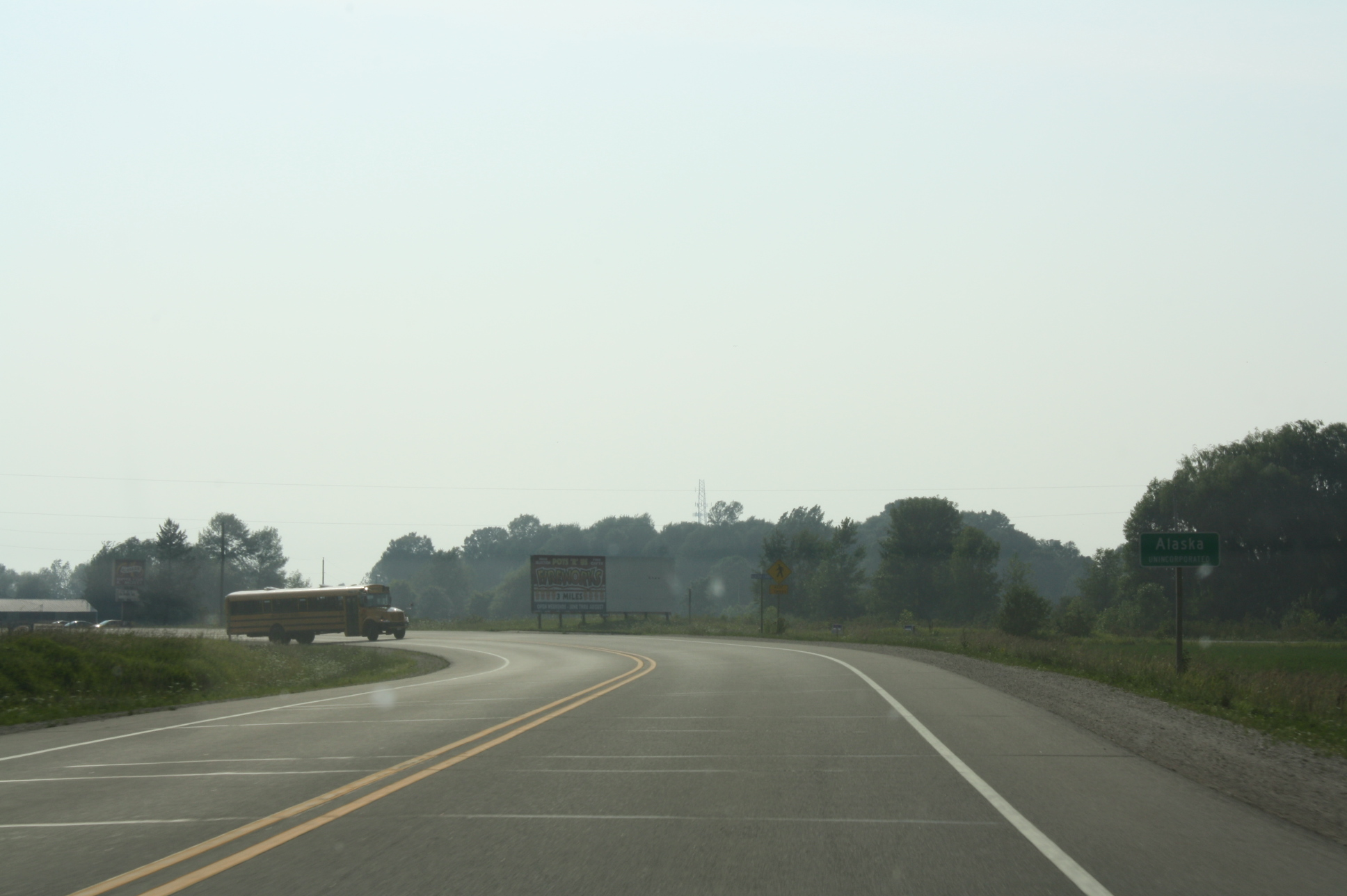
Sign on WIS 42 in August

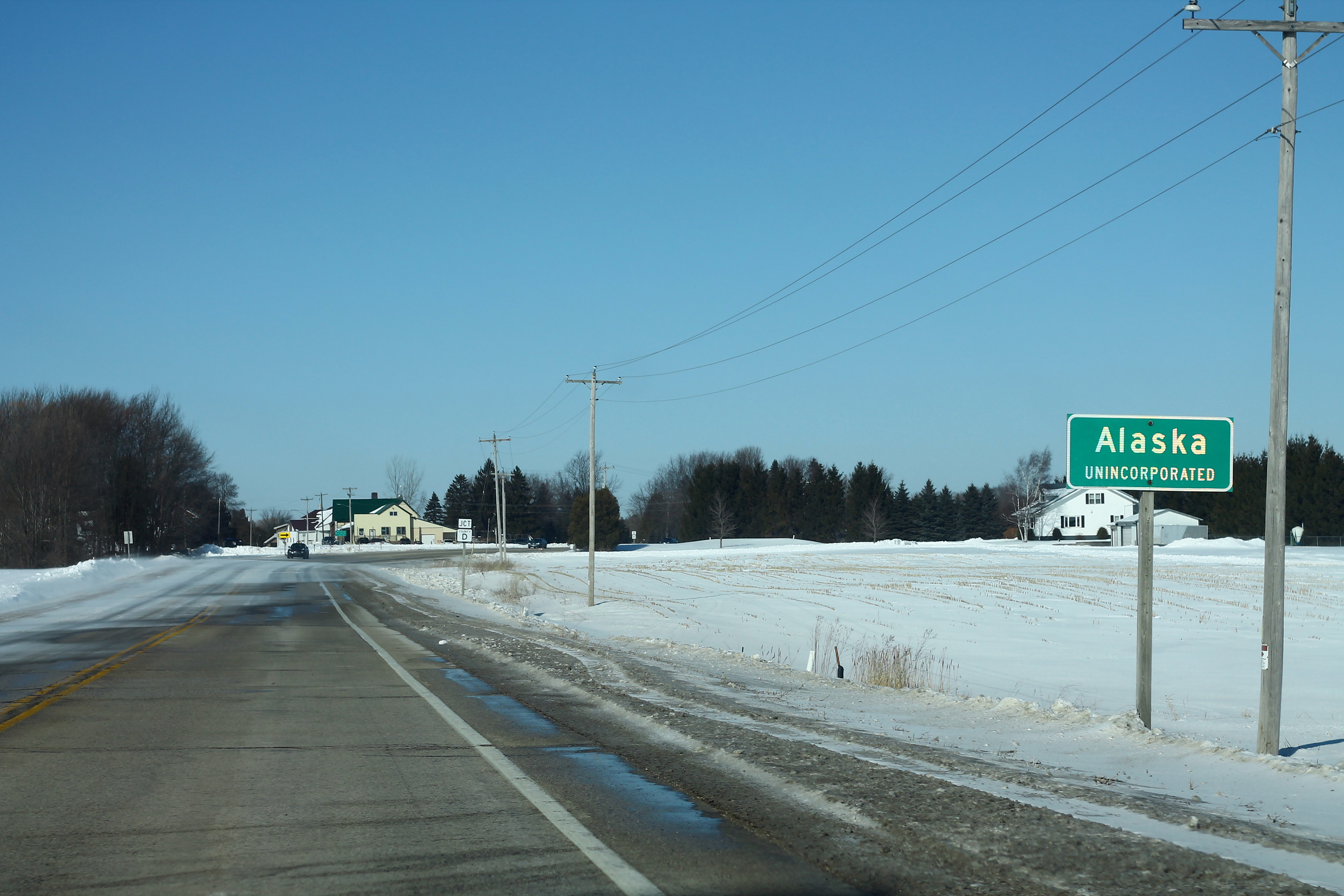
Sign on WIS 42 in February

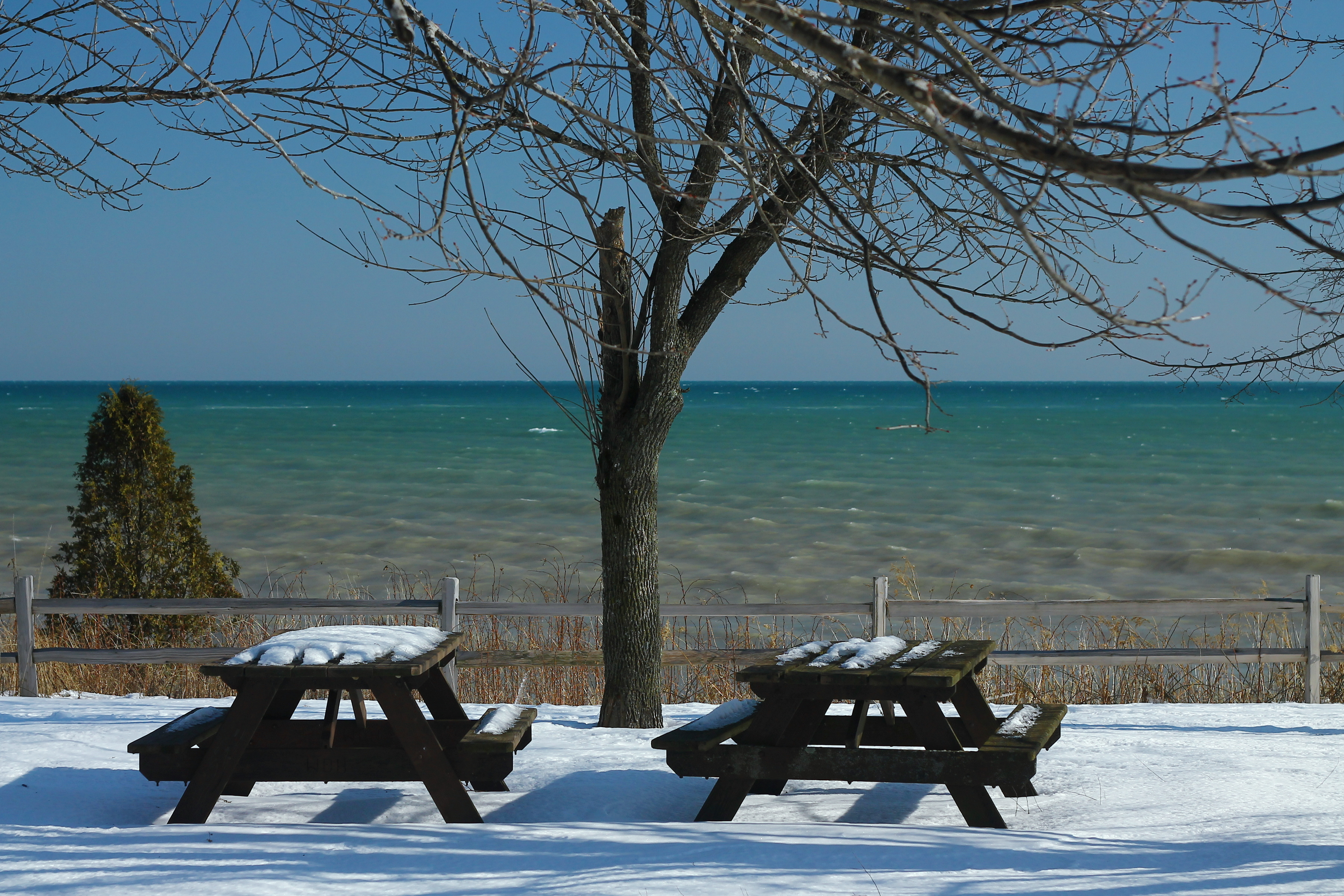
Lakeside picnic tables in February
