= Caledonia, Wisconsin (disambiguation) =

Caledonia is the name of some places in the U.S. state of Wisconsin:

- Caledonia, Wisconsin, a village in Racine County
- Caledonia, Columbia County, Wisconsin, a town in Columbia County
- Caledonia, Trempealeau County, Wisconsin, a town in Trempealeau County
- Caledonia, Waupaca County, Wisconsin, a town in Waupaca County
