= Caledonia, Trempealeau County, Wisconsin =

Caledonia, Wisconsin
- Town
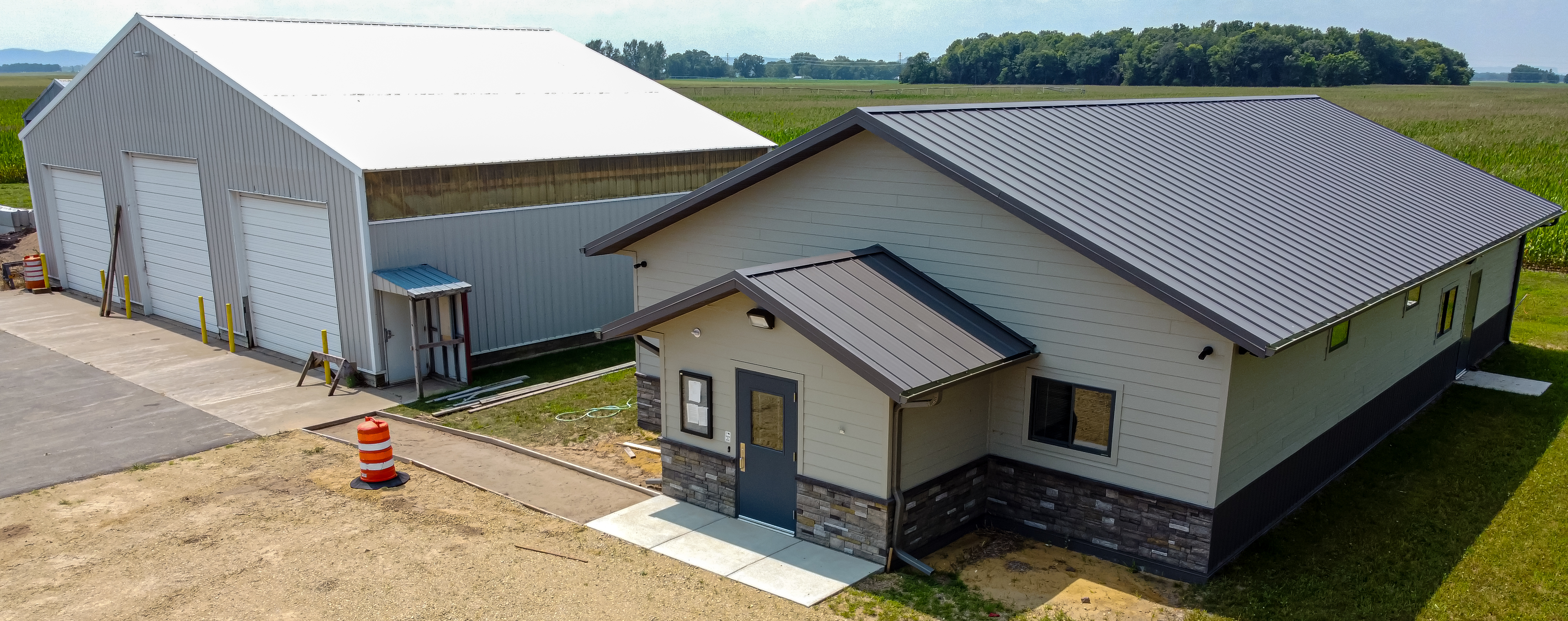
- Caledonia Town Hall

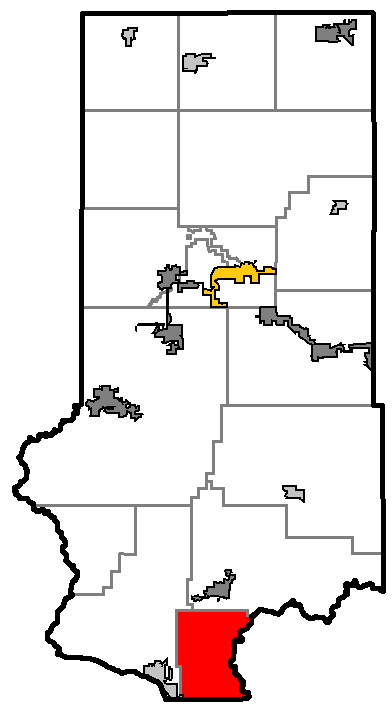
- Location of Caledonia, Trempealeau County, Wisconsin

- Location of Trempealeau County, Wisconsin
- Coordinates: 44°1′13″N 91°21′30″W
- Country: United States
- State: Wisconsin
- County: Trempealeau

Area
  - Total: 21.3 sq mi (55.2 km^{2})
  - Land: 20.9 sq mi (54.1 km^{2})
  - Water: 0.42 sq mi (1.1 km^{2})
- Elevation: 735 ft (224 m)

Population (2020)
  - Total: 928
  - Density: 44.4/sq mi (17.2/km^{2})
- Time zone: UTC-6 (Central (CST))
  - Summer (DST): UTC-5 (CDT)
- FIPS code: 55-11975
- GNIS feature ID: 1582905
- Website: https://towncaledonia.org/

Caledonia (/ˌkæləˈdoʊniə/ KAL-ə-DOH-nee-ə) is a town in Trempealeau County, Wisconsin, United States. The population was 928 at the 2020 census.

== Geography ==
According to the United States Census Bureau, the town has a total area of 21.3 square miles (55.2 km^{2}), of which 20.9 square miles (54.1 km^{2}) is land and 0.4 square mile (1.1 km^{2}) (2.02%) is water.

== Demographics ==
As of the census of 2000, there were 759 people, 262 households, and 204 families residing in the town. The population density was 36.4 people per square mile (14.0/km^{2}). There were 285 housing units at an average density of 13.7 per square mile (5.3/km^{2}). The racial makeup of the town was 99.34% White, 0.40% Native American, 0.13% Asian, and 0.13% from two or more races. Hispanic or Latino of any race were 1.05% of the population.

There were 262 households, out of which 44.3% had children under the age of 18 living with them, 63.7% were married couples living together, 8.0% had a female householder with no husband present, and 22.1% were non-families. 19.1% of all households were made up of individuals, and 7.6% had someone living alone who was 65 years of age or older. The average household size was 2.90 and the average family size was 3.33.

The population was 32.7% under the age of 18, 6.9% from 18 to 24, 32.0% from 25 to 44, 20.8% from 45 to 64, and 7.6% who were 65 years of age or older. The median age was 34 years. For every 100 females, there were 105.7 males. For every 100 females age 18 and over, there were 106.9 males.

The median income for a household in the town was $47,292, and the median income for a family was $51,063. Males had a median income of $28,824 versus $21,908 for females. The per capita income for the town was $17,025. About 3.6% of families and 4.2% of the population were below the poverty line, including 4.7% of those under age 18 and none of those age 65 or over.
