= Pierce, Wisconsin =

- Town
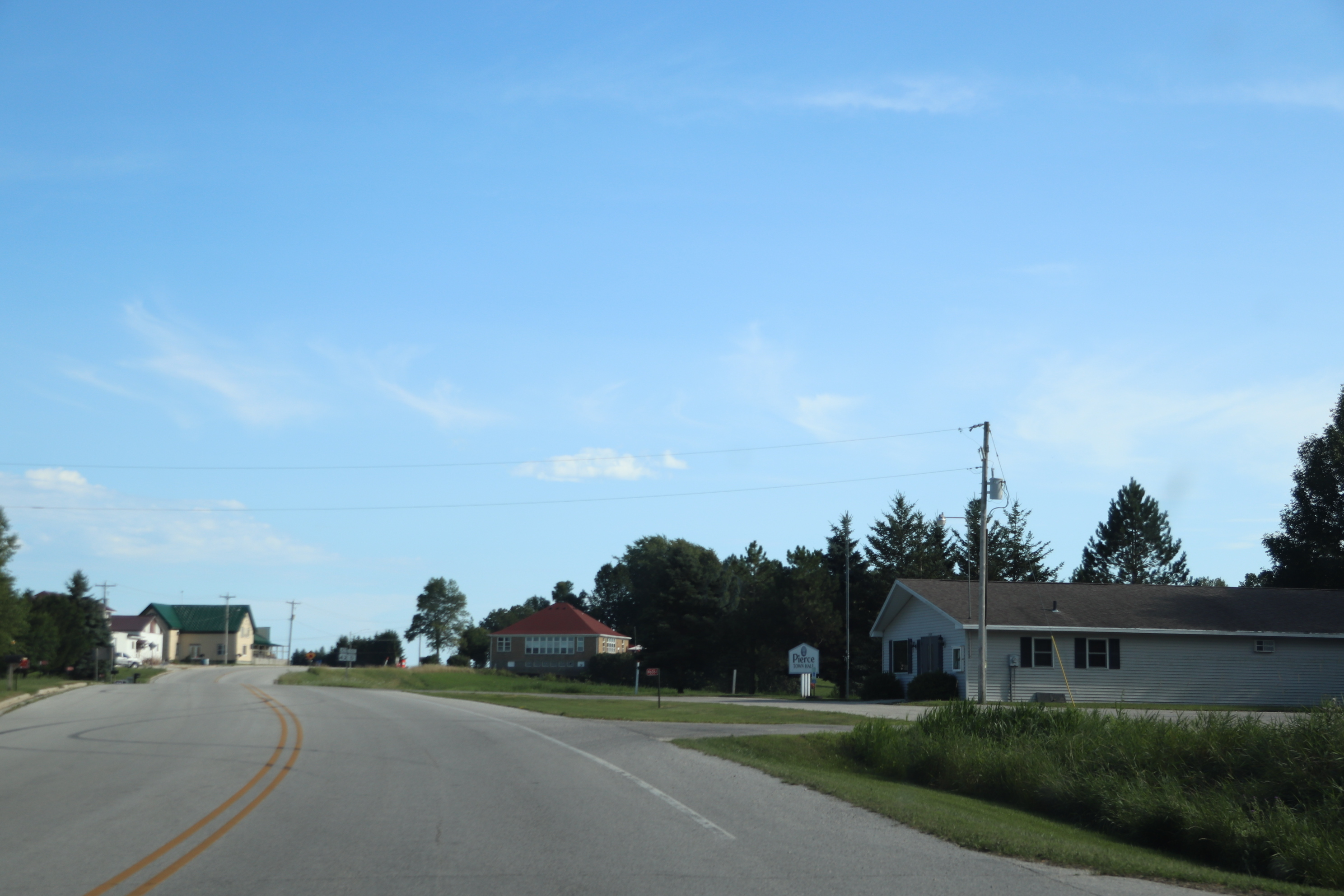
- Town hall (right)

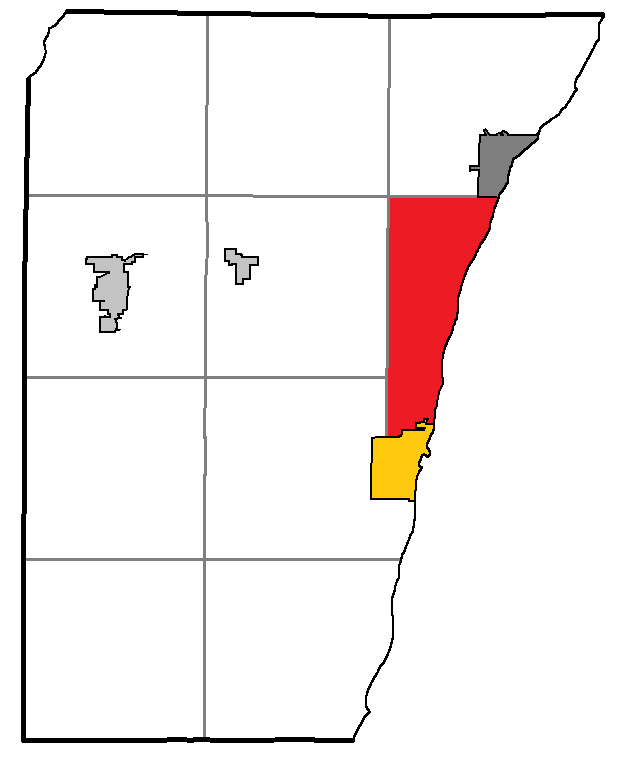
- Location of Pierce, within Kewaunee County
- Coordinates: 44°32′10″N 87°29′27″W
- Country: United States
- State: Wisconsin
- County: Kewaunee

Area
  - Total: 21.67 sq mi (56.13 km^{2})
  - Land: 18.48 sq mi (47.87 km^{2})
  - Water: 3.19 sq mi (8.26 km^{2})
- Elevation: 690 ft (210 m)

Population (2020)
  - Total: 772
  - Density: 41.8/sq mi (16.1/km^{2})
- Time zone: UTC-6 (Central (CST))
  - Summer (DST): UTC-5 (CDT)
- Area code: 920
- FIPS code: 55-62625
- GNIS feature ID: 1583920
- Website: townofpierce.com

Pierce is a town in Kewaunee County, Wisconsin, United States. The population was 772 at the 2020 census.

== Communities ==
- Alaska is an unincorporated community located mostly along County Road D, north of its terminus at WIS 42. The community was named after the Alaskan Territory.
- Rostok is an unincorporated community also located along WIS 42, but near the southern part of the town at the highway's intersection with 1st Road. The community was named after a city in Bohemia.

== Geography ==
Pierce is in eastern Kewaunee County and is bordered by the city of Algoma to the north, Kewaunee to the south, and Lake Michigan to the east. According to the United States Census Bureau, the town has a total area of 21.7 square miles (56.1 km^{2}), of which 18.5 square miles (47.9 km^{2}) are land and 3.2 square miles (8.3 km^{2}), or 14.71%, are water.

== Demographics ==
At the 2000 census there were 897 people, 329 households, and 261 families in the town. The population density was 48.3 people per square mile (18.6/km^{2}). There were 407 housing units at an average density of 21.9 per square mile (8.5/km^{2}). The racial makeup of the town was 98.10% White, 0.11% African American, 1.00% Native American, 0.11% Asian, 0.22% from other races, and 0.45% from two or more races. Hispanic or Latino of any race were 1.00%.

Of the 329 households 33.4% had children under the age of 18 living with them, 67.5% were married couples living together, 7.6% had a female householder with no husband present, and 20.4% were non-families. 16.7% of households were one person and 5.2% were one person aged 65 or older. The average household size was 2.72 and the average family size was 3.05.

The age distribution was 27.6% under the age of 18, 5.7% from 18 to 24, 26.9% from 25 to 44, 29.4% from 45 to 64, and 10.4% 65 or older. The median age was 38 years. For every 100 females, there were 108.1 males. For every 100 females age 18 and over, there were 109.4 males.

The median household income was $43,000 and the median family income was $46,364. Males had a median income of $31,667 versus $23,750 for females. The per capita income for the town was $18,384. About 10.9% of families and 15.2% of the population were below the poverty line, including 26.1% of those under age 18 and 2.2% of those age 65 or over.

== Gallery ==
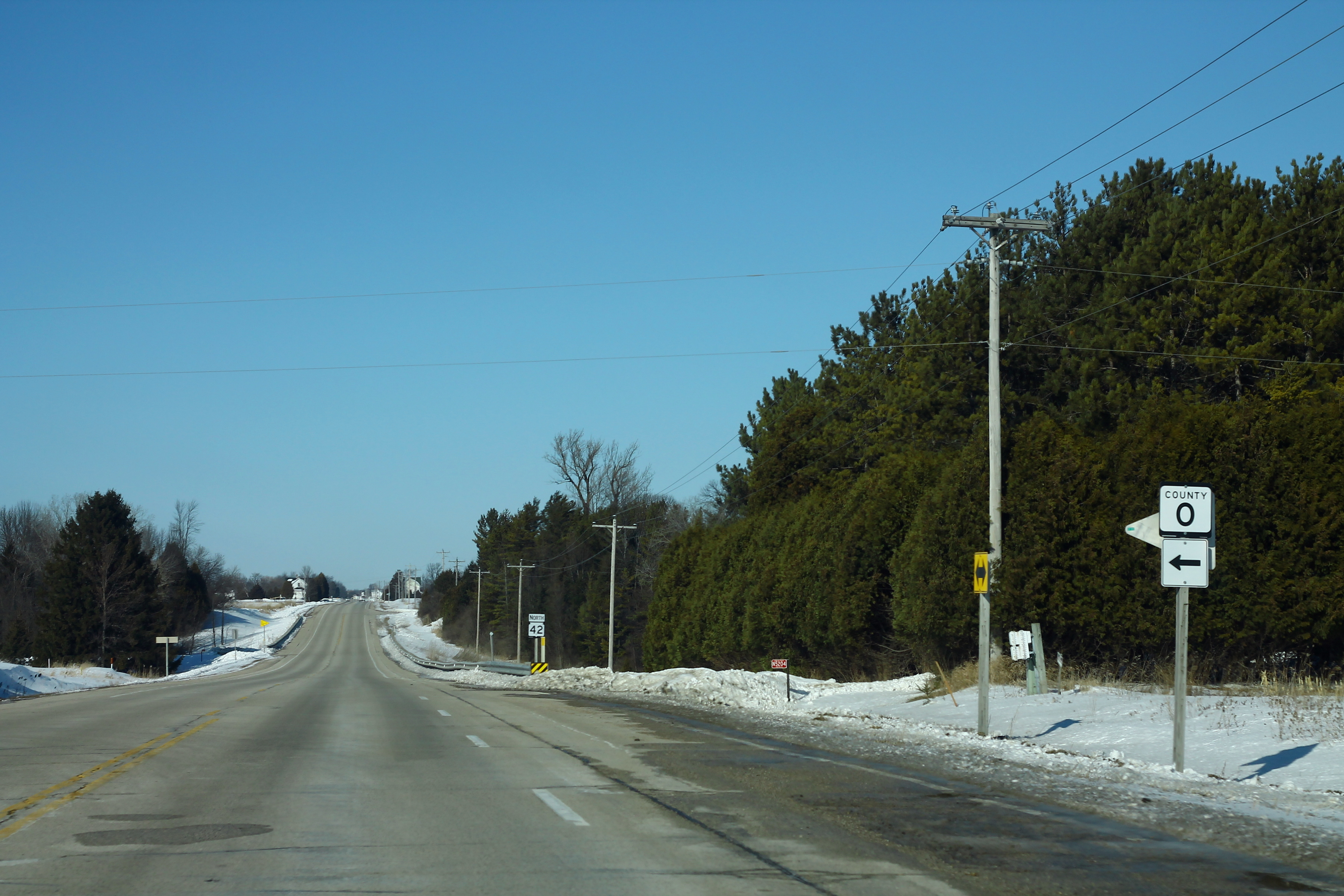
Looking north on Wisconsin Highway 42 at the junction with County Trunk O in the Town of Pierce
