= Valencia, New Mexico =

Two communities share the name Valencia in the U.S. state of New Mexico:

- Valencia, Santa Fe County, New Mexico
- Valencia, Valencia County, New Mexico
