= Benzen (Walsrode) =

- Ortschaft of Walsrode
- Interactive map of Benzen
- Location within Germany Location within Lower Saxony
- Coordinates: 52°50′0.67″N 9°34′35.31″E
- Country: Germany
- State: Lower Saxony
- District: Heidekreis
- Town: Walsrode

Area
  - Total: 8.1 km^{2} (3.1 sq mi)
- Elevation: 38 m (125 ft)

Population
  - Total: 240
  - Density: 30/km^{2} (77/sq mi)
- Time zone: UTC+01:00 (CET)
  - Summer (DST): UTC+02:00 (CEST)
- Postal codes: 29664
- Dialling codes: 05161

Benzen is a village and Ortschaft in the town of Walsrode in the Heidekreis district, Lower Saxony, north Germany.

== Location ==
The village lies south of the town of Walsrode on the River Böhme in the Lüneburg Heath. Benzen is only separated from Walsrode by a wood. Northeast of the village runs at a distance of 1 km the B 27 motorway, to the east is the L 190, also 1 km away.

== History ==
The name of the village probably comes from the Old German word Bendeffen, which means Burg or castle. Near the village is the magistrate's stone (Gerichtsstein). At this spot there was a thingstead, at which a court (Holting) met on 17 June 1491 to determine forest rights. The village of Bensenville, Illinois, in the United States, is named after the village.
