= Samaria, Indiana =

- Unincorporated community
- Location within Indiana Location within the United States
- Coordinates: 39°24′14″N 86°11′11″W
- Country: United States
- State: Indiana
- County: Johnson
- Township: Hensley
- Elevation: 801 ft (244 m)
- ZIP code: 46181
- FIPS code: 18-67680
- GNIS feature ID: 442947

Samaria is an unincorporated community in Hensley Township, Johnson County, Indiana.

== History ==
Samaria was originally called Newburg and was platted as Newburg in 1852. The name was officially changed to Samaria in 1869. The community was named after the ancient city of Samaria.
