= Aleppo Township, Greene County, Pennsylvania =

Township in Pennsylvania, US

Coordinates: 39°49′23″N 80°26′44″W

- Township
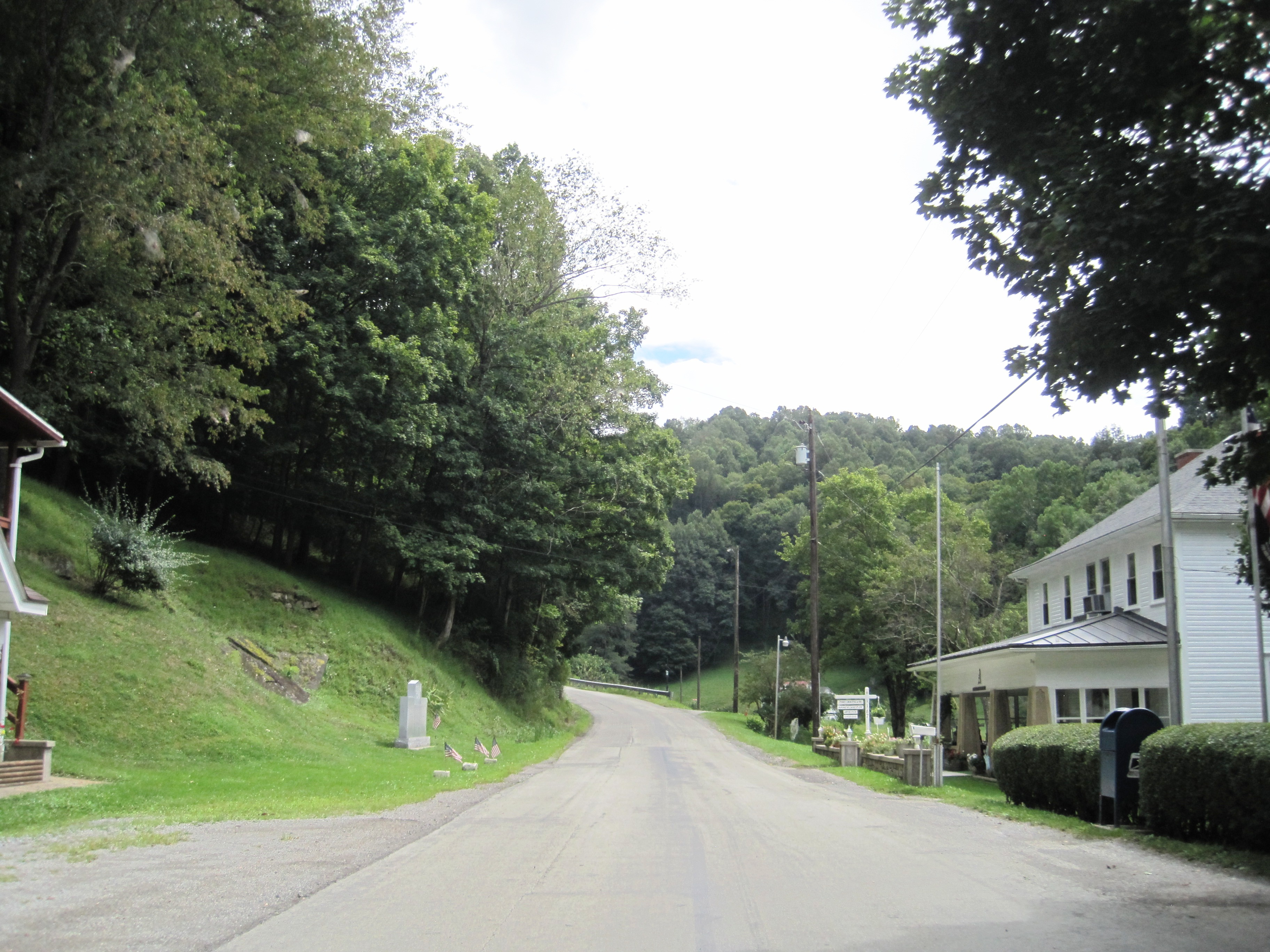
- Village of Aleppo within the township

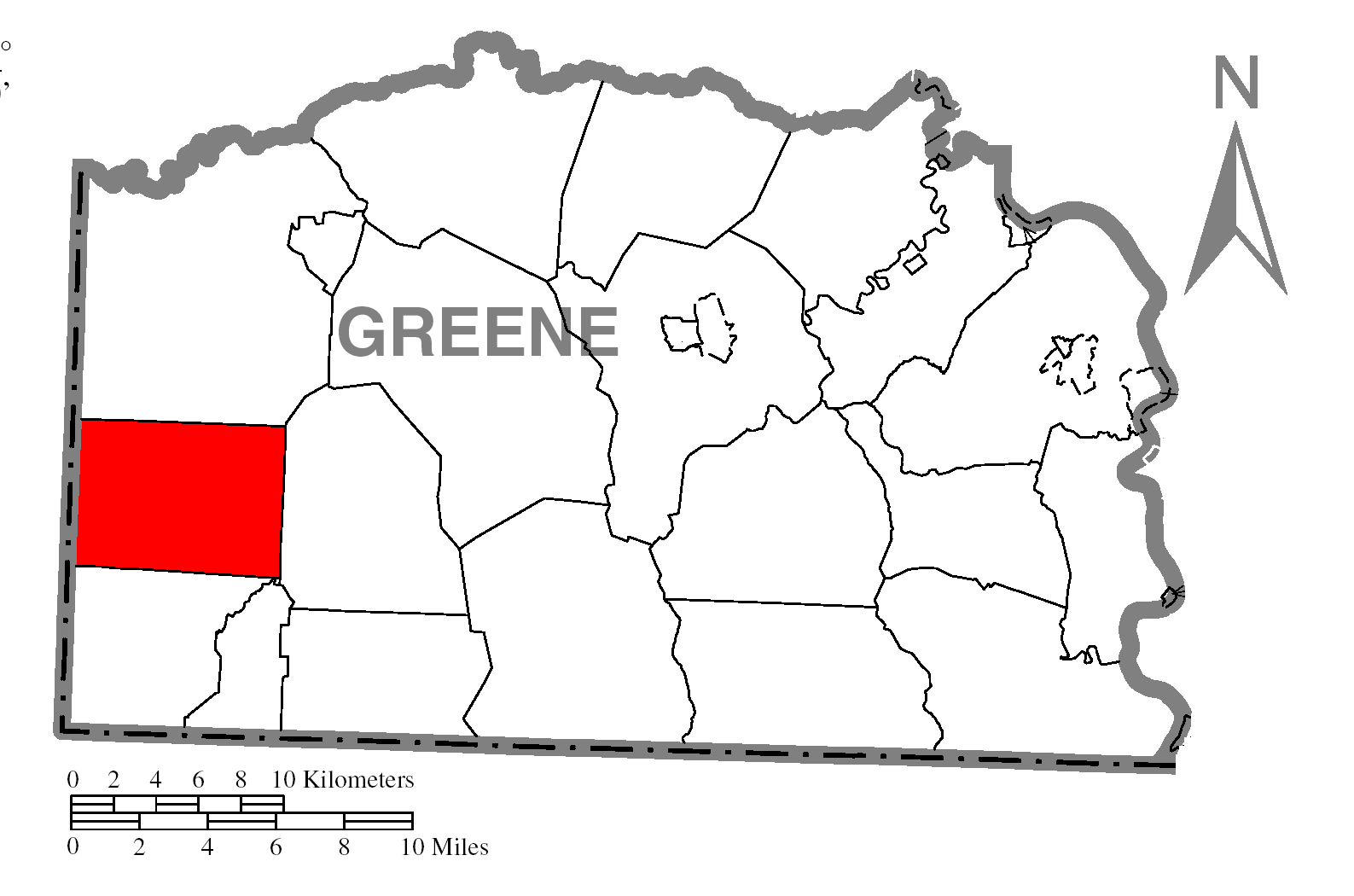
- Location of Aleppo Township in Greene County

- Location of Greene County in Pennsylvania
- Country: United States
- State: Pennsylvania
- County: Greene

Area
  - Total: 27.95 sq mi (72.40 km^{2})
  - Land: 27.95 sq mi (72.40 km^{2})
  - Water: 0 sq mi (0.00 km^{2})
- Elevation: 1,050 ft (320 m)

Population (2020)
  - Total: 424 ▼
  - Estimate (2023): 410
  - Density: 17.7/sq mi (6.82/km^{2})
- Time zone: UTC-4 (EST)
  - Summer (DST): UTC-5 (EDT)
- Area code: 724
- FIPS code: 42-059-00740

Aleppo Township is a township in Greene County, Pennsylvania, United States. The population was 424 at the 2020 census, down from 502 at the 2010 census.

== Geography ==
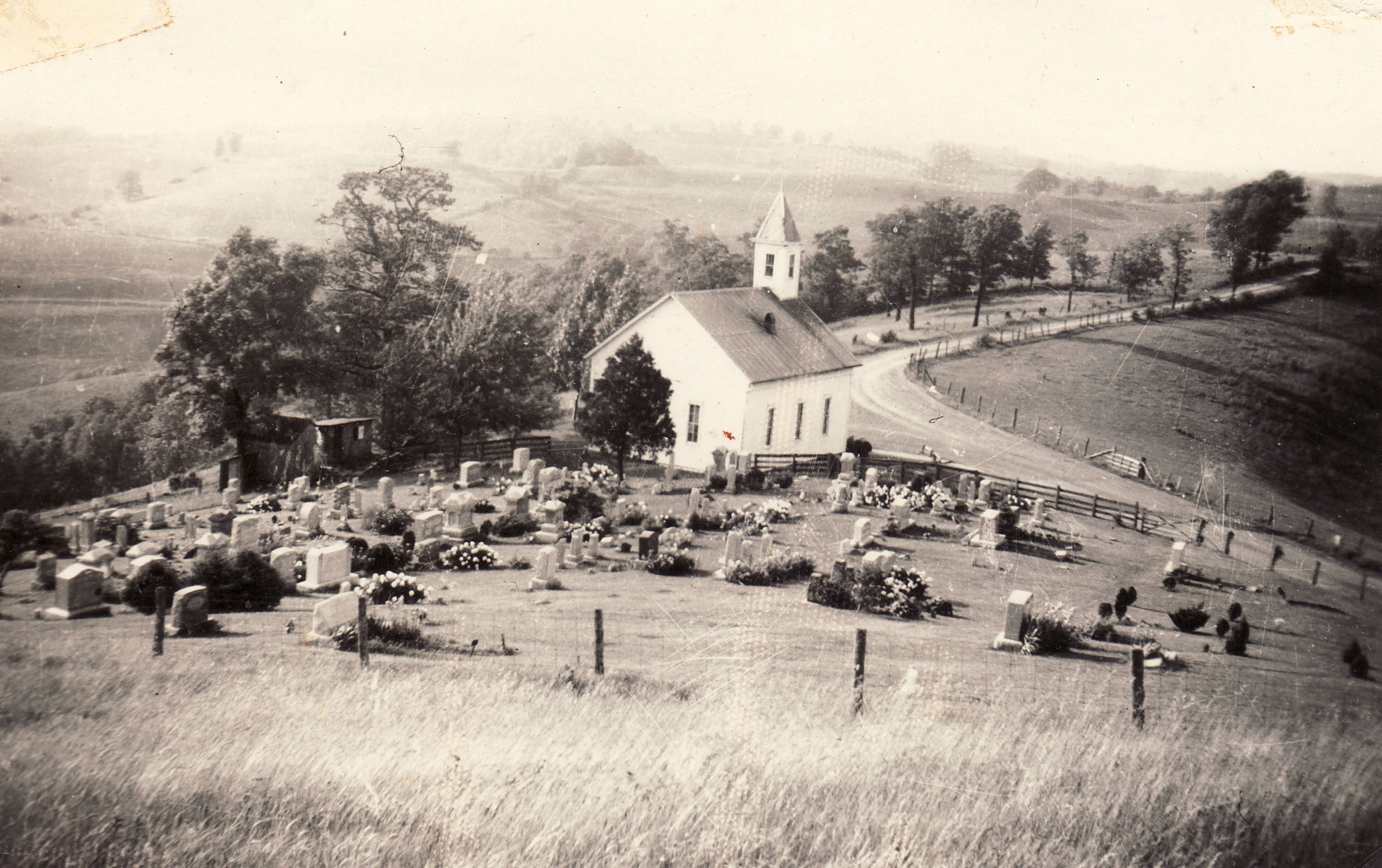
Centennial Cemetery

Aleppo Township is located in western Greene County, with the western border of the township following the Pennsylvania–West Virginia line. According to the United States Census Bureau, the township has a total area of 28.0 square miles (72.4 km^{2}), all land. The township includes the unincorporated communities of McCracken, Aleppo, Morford, and Windy Gap.

== Demographics ==
Historical population
Census	Pop.	Note	%±
2000	597		—
2010	502		−15.9%
2020	425		−15.3%
2025 (est.)	404		−4.9%
U.S. Decennial Census

As of the census of 2000, there were 597 people, 233 households, and 164 families residing in the township. The population density was 21.9 people per square mile (8.5/km^{2}). There were 282 housing units at an average density of 10.3/sq mi (4.0/km^{2}). The racial makeup of the township was 99.66% White, 0.17% Native American, and 0.17% from two or more races.

There were 233 households, out of which 30.0% had children under the age of 18 living with them, 57.1% were married couples living together, 6.9% had a female householder with no husband present, and 29.6% were non-families. 26.2% of all households were made up of individuals, and 13.3% had someone living alone who was 65 years of age or older. The average household size was 2.56 and the average family size was 3.11.

In the township the population was spread out, with 25.0% under the age of 18, 7.2% from 18 to 24, 26.8% from 25 to 44, 27.6% from 45 to 64, and 13.4% who were 65 years of age or older. The median age was 40 years. For every 100 females, there were 118.7 males. For every 100 females age 18 and over, there were 112.3 males.

The median income for a household in the township was $30,125, and the median income for a family was $36,563. Males had a median income of $32,500 versus $21,875 for females. The per capita income for the township was $13,346. About 17.6% of families and 24.0% of the population were below the poverty line, including 39.4% of those under age 18 and 13.8% of those age 65 or over.
