= Aleppo, Pennsylvania =

Unincorporated community in Pennsylvania, US

- Unincorporated community
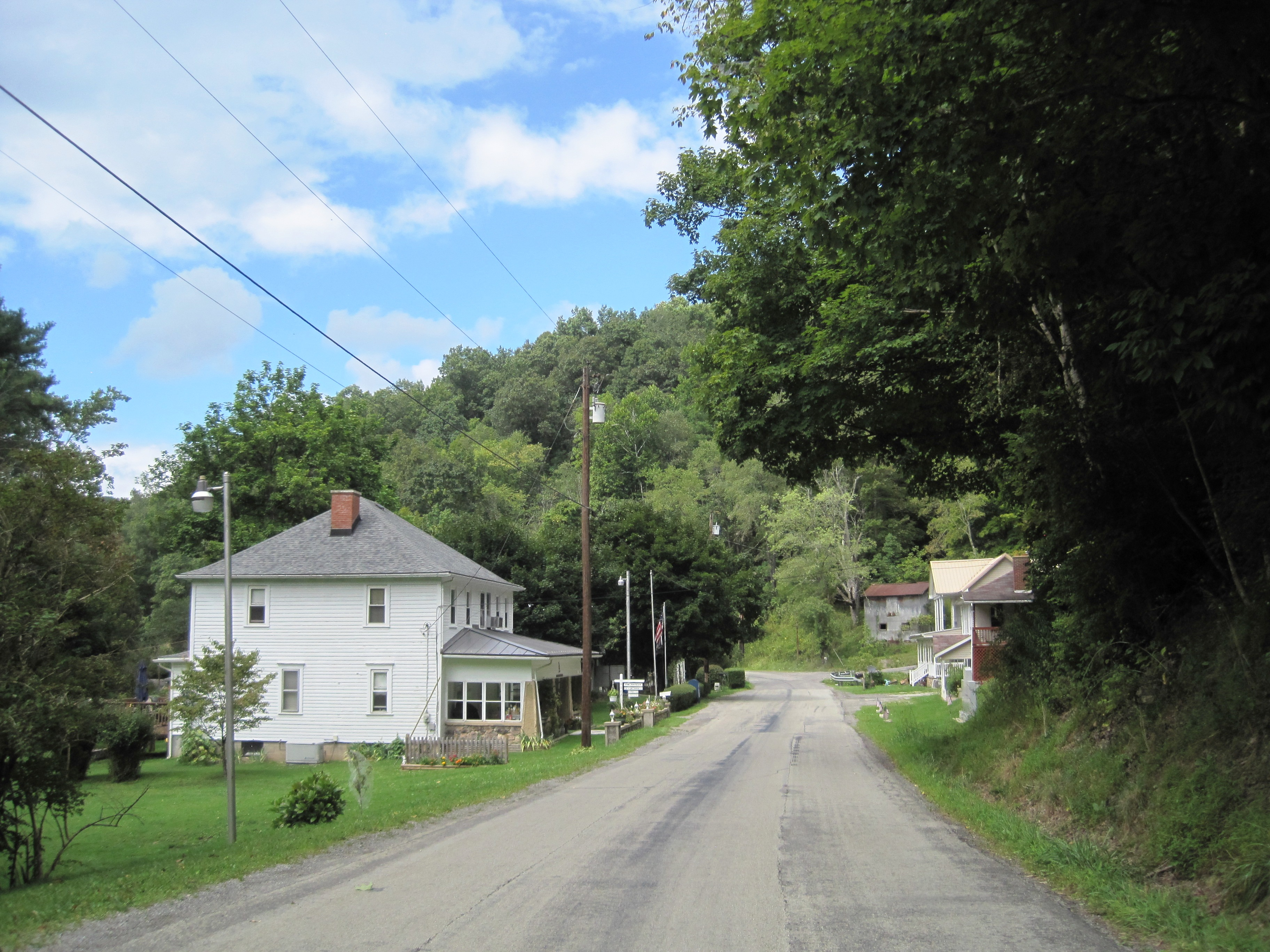
- Northbound Aleppo Road in Aleppo

- Location within Pennsylvania
- Coordinates: 39°49′26″N 80°26′46″W
- Country: United States
- State: Pennsylvania
- County: Greene
- Elevation: 1,060 ft (320 m)
- Time zone: UTC-5 (Eastern (EST))
  - Summer (DST): UTC-4 (EDT)
- ZIP code: 15310
- Area codes: 724, 878
- GNIS feature ID: 1202959

Aleppo is an unincorporated community in Aleppo Township, Greene County, in the U.S. state of Pennsylvania.

== History ==
A post office called Aleppo has been in operation since 1869. The community was named after the Syrian city of Aleppo.
