= East Alaska Lake =

Lake in Wisconsin, United States

- Location within Wisconsin Location within the United States
- Location: Kewaunee County, Wisconsin
- Coordinates: 44.544999°N 87.500920°W
- Basin countries: United States
- Surface area: 53 acres (21 ha)
- Average depth: 17 ft (5.2 m)
- Max. depth: 50 ft (15 m)
- Surface elevation: 696 ft (212 m)
- Settlements: Alaska, Wisconsin

East Alaska Lake is a lake in central Kewaunee County, Wisconsin, it is the biggest inland lake in the county. The lake is located on a golf course. Fish in the lake include Bluegill, Largemouth Bass, Northern Pike, and Muskellunge.
