= Pictou, Colorado =

Unincorporated community in Huerfano County, CO, USA

- Unincorporated community
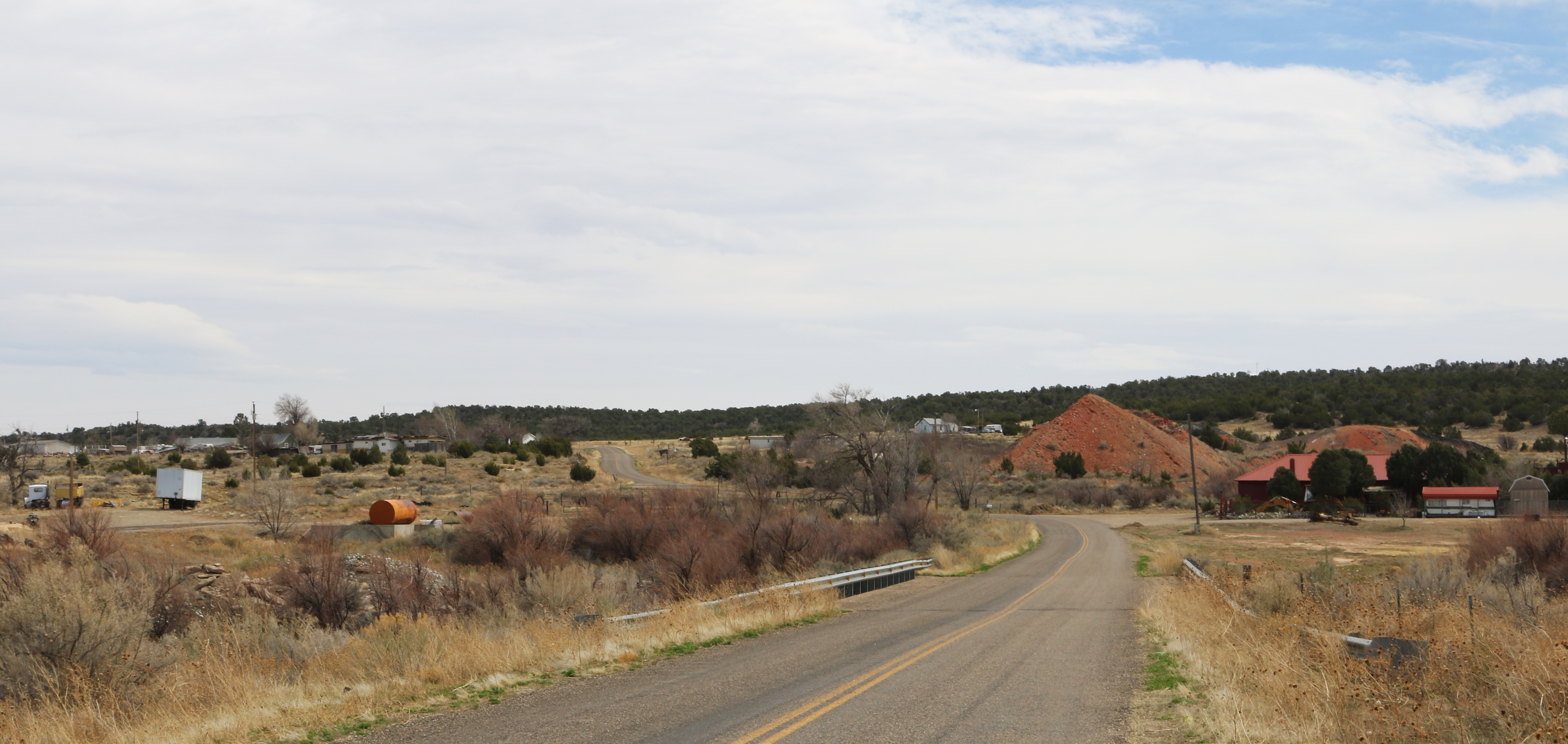
- Pictou in 2018.

- Location within Colorado Location within the United States
- Coordinates: 37°38′19″N 104°48′49″W
- Country: United States
- State: Colorado
- County: Huerfano
- Named after: Pictou, Nova Scotia, Canada
- Elevation: 6,280 ft (1,910 m)
- GNIS feature ID: 194254

Pictou is an unincorporated community in Huerfano County, Colorado, United States.

== History ==
A post office called Pictou was established in 1889, and remained in operation until 1932. The community was named after Pictou, Nova Scotia, the native home of a mining official Thomas Lowther.
