= Thingvalla Township, Pembina County, North Dakota =

Thingvalla Township
- Township
- Location within the state of North Dakota
- Coordinates: 48°39′58″N 97°51′3″W
- Country: United States
- State: North Dakota
- County: Pembina
- Organized: 1882

Area
  - Total: 36.05 sq mi (93.4 km^{2})
  - Land: 36.04 sq mi (93.3 km^{2})
  - Water: 0.1 sq mi (0.26 km^{2})
- Elevation: 1,014 ft (309 m)

Population (2000)
  - Total: 252
  - Density: 3.4/sq mi (1.3/km^{2})
- Time zone: UTC-6 (Central (CST))
  - Summer (DST): UTC-5 (CDT)
- Area code: 701
- FIPS code: 38-78620
- GNIS feature ID: 1036722

Thingvalla Township is a township in Pembina County, North Dakota, United States. The 2000 census reported a population of 121, and an estimated population of 103 as of 2009. President Ólafur Ragnar Grímsson of Iceland visited the area in 1999 to dedicate a monument to poet K. N. Julius at Thingvalla Church, and Prime Minister Geir Haarde visited in 2007 to dedicate a memorial to the church, which burned to the ground in 2003.

The 2nd of August Celebration, commonly known as the "Deuce of August" is an annual event in the township. It commemorates the adoption of a new constitution on August 2, 1874, when Iceland was still a part of Denmark. While it was never an official national holiday in Iceland, it is very popular among Americans of Icelandic descent. The celebration in Thingvalla Township is reportedly the largest Icelandic ethnic event in the United States.

== History ==
Thingvalla Township was organized in 1882, and, along with Gardar, Beaulieu and Akra Townships, was known as one of the "Icelandic Townships," due to the large population of Icelanders who had settled here. Thingvalla is named after Þingvellir in Iceland, the site of Iceland's first parliament (930–1789), and now home to a historical national park. Thingvalla roughly translates to "parliament meadows."

Thingvalla Township was a "double township," spanning two full survey townships. In 1886, the southern part of the township was organized separately as Gardar Township, named after Gardar Svavarsson, who was reportedly the first Scandinavian to visit Iceland.

== Thingvalla Church ==
The Thingvalla Icelandic Lutheran Church was built in Thingvalla Township in the early 1890s. The church and community that surrounded it was also known locally as Eyford. The Eyford community was located roughly halfway between Mountain and Gardar. Eyford itself was first established in 1887 as a rural post office.

The church was part of the Pembina Hills Evangelical Lutheran and operated for more than 100 years. The church was unique among other Icelandic churches in the area, due to its original furnishings, including the organ, altar statue, and pews, and its similarity to the church in Þingvellir, Iceland.

The church was used more infrequently in its later years, primarily for special occasions. The church was destroyed by a fire June 3, 2003, during a restoration project. The church was a popular attraction among tourists from Iceland who visited the area. News of the fire even reached as far as Reykjavík, appearing in the Morgunbladid Daily Newspaper. A monument to Icelandic poet K. N. Julius, who is buried there, and the cemetery remain.

Former Prime Minister Geir Haarde of Iceland visited Thingvalla Church during the annual Deuce of August celebration to dedicate a new memorial at the site. The memorial preserves the church's stone foundation and includes a wildflower garden and a replica of the original altar statue.

== Notable persons ==
Icelandic poet Kristjan Niels Julius (1860 – 1936) made his home in Pembina County much of his life, residing in Thingvalla Township. He was born Akureyri, Iceland, April 7, 1860, and emigrated to America in 1878. Julius originally lived in Winnipeg and later Duluth, Minnesota before settling in Thingvalla Township around 1894. He was well known for his satirical poems in both Iceland and in America. Julius is buried at the Thingvalla Church Cemetery, where there is a monument to him. Vilhjálmur Stefanson, noted Arctic explorer, ethnologist and teacher, grew up just southwest of Mountain.
