= Baptie =

Baptie is a surname. Notable people with the surname include:

- Crawford Baptie (born 1959), Scottish footballer
- Norval Baptie (1879–1966), Canadian speed skater
- Trisha Baptie (born 1974), Canadian anti-prostitution activist
