= Vikur Lutheran Church at Mountain =

Historic church in North Dakota, United States

- U.S. National Register of Historic Places
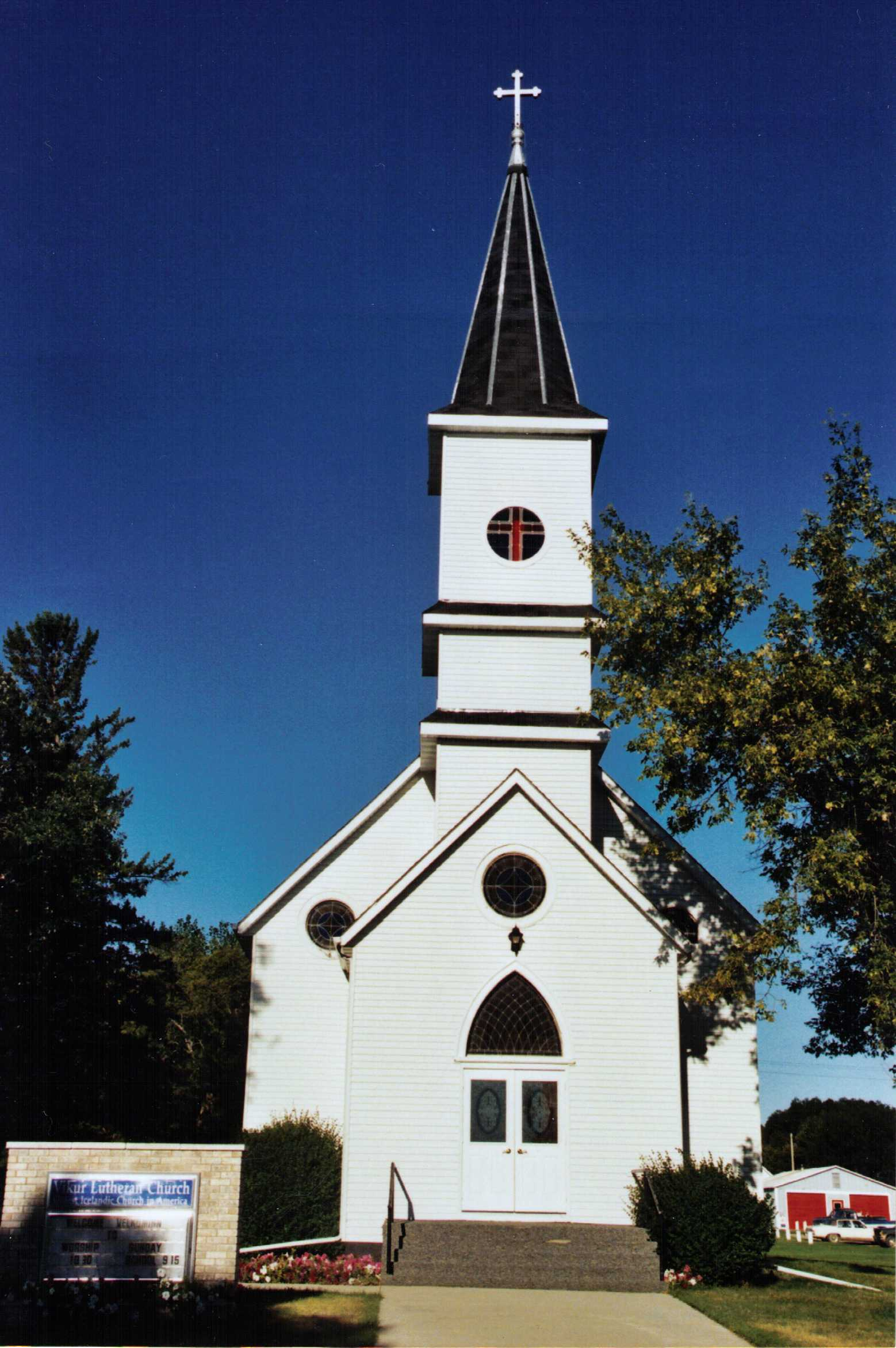

- Location within North Dakota Location within the United States
- Location: 290 Main Ave., Mountain, North Dakota
- Coordinates: 48°40′52″N 97°51′54″W
- Area: less than one acre
- Built: 1884
- Architectural style: Late Gothic Revival
- NRHP reference No.: 13000862
- Added to NRHP: November 7, 2013

The Vikur Lutheran Church at Mountain is an historic Lutheran church building in Mountain, Pembina County, North Dakota. Built in 1885, it is the oldest Icelandic Lutheran church in the United States. The Gothic Revival wood-frame building was built in land donated in 1881 by the pastor Páll Thorláksson, who was influential in establishing the Icelandic American community in the area, and who died in 1882, before its construction. Most of the wood used to build Vikur Lutheran Church at Mountain came from the land owned by Friðbjörn Björnsson, who emigrated from Iceland in 1873, leaving from the farm Baldursheimur in Möðruvallaklaustur Parish, Eyjafjarðarsysla, and homesteaded east of Mountain on Cart Creek in 1881.

The church and associated cemetery were listed on the National Register of Historic Places in 2013.

== See also ==
- Icelandic Evangelical Lutheran Church, Pembina, also National Register-listed
