= Backoo, North Dakota =

- Unincorporated community
- Location within North Dakota Location within the United States
- Country: United States
- State: North Dakota
- County: Pembina
- Elevation: 912 ft (278 m)
- Time zone: UTC-6 (Central (CST))
  - Summer (DST): UTC-5 (CDT)
- Area code: 701
- GNIS feature ID: 1027778

Backoo is an unincorporated community in Advance Township in North Dakota's Pembina County, United States, located approximately five miles northwest of Cavalier. It was established in 1887 as a townsite along the Great Northern Railroad.

== History ==
Backoo was a town of roughly 50 people, and was one of the more prominent communities in the township. The post office was established September 26, 1887, and was in continuous operation for more than 100 years, closing October 11, 1988. The post office was assigned the ZIP code of 58215. Mail service is now handled through Cavalier.

John Mountain, one of its first settlers, is reported to have named the town after the Barcoo River in his home country of Australia. Other sources credit the origin of the name to Baku, a city in Azerbaijan on the Caspian Sea.

The population was 40 in 1940.
