= Advance Township, Pembina County, North Dakota =

Advance Township
- Township
- Location within the state of North Dakota
- Coordinates: 48°51′12″N 97°45′50″W
- Country: United States
- State: North Dakota
- County: Pembina

Area
  - Total: 35.9 sq mi (92.9 km^{2})
  - Land: 35.8 sq mi (92.8 km^{2})
  - Water: 0 sq mi (0.0 km^{2})
- Elevation: 945 ft (288 m)

Population (2000)
  - Total: 143
  - Density: 3.9/sq mi (1.5/km^{2})
- Time zone: UTC-6 (Central (CST))
  - Summer (DST): UTC-5 (CDT)
- Area code: 701
- FIPS code: 38-00700
- GNIS feature ID: 1036731

Advance Township (formerly Avon Township) is a township in Pembina County, North Dakota, United States. At the time of the 2000 Census, its population was 143, with an estimated 122 people as of 2009.

== History ==
Advance Township was organized in 1888 from the northern part of Akra Township. Akra Township was a "double township" at the time, covering two full survey townships. It was originally named Avon Township, but renamed Advance in 1905.

Some early settlers in the township migrated here from the nearby Icelandic communities. The township population of 482 in 1900 was likely near the peak population.

Backoo, a town of approximately 50 people northwest of Cavalier, was the most prominent population center in the township. It was established in 1887 as a townsite on the Great Northern Railroad. The post office here was in continuous operation from 1887 to 1988.
