= Canton City =

Canton City can refer to:

- Guangzhou, Guangdong, a city in China
- Canton City, North Dakota in USA
- Canton, Ohio in USA
- Canton, Georgia in USA
