= Pembina County, North Dakota =

County in North Dakota, United States

- County
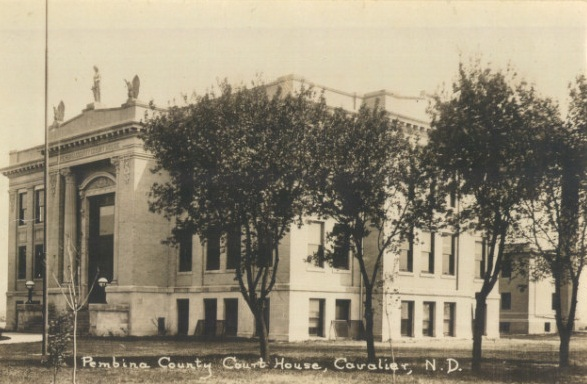
- Pembina County Courthouse before 1920

- Location within the U.S. state of North Dakota
- Coordinates: 48.766896°N 97.545405°W
- Country: United States
- State: North Dakota
- Founded: January 9, 1867 (created); August 12, 1867 (organized)
- Named for: an Ojibwemowin term
- Seat: Cavalier
- Largest city: Cavalier

Area
  - Total: 1,121.241 sq mi (2,904.00 km^{2})
  - Land: 1,118.535 sq mi (2,896.99 km^{2})
  - Water: 2.706 sq mi (7.01 km^{2}) 0.24%

Population (2020)
  - Total: 6,844
  - Estimate (2025): 6,568 ▼
  - Density: 5.889/sq mi (2.274/km^{2})
- Time zone: UTC−6 (Central)
  - Summer (DST): UTC−5 (CDT)
- Area code: 701
- Congressional district: At-large
- Website: pembinacountynd.gov

Pembina County is a county in the U.S. state of North Dakota. As of the 2020 census, the population was 6,844, and was estimated to be 6,568 in 2025. The county seat and the largest city is Cavalier. Pembina County is home to the Pembina Hills as well as Icelandic State Park and Lake Renwick which is 6 miles west of the city Cavalier.

== History ==
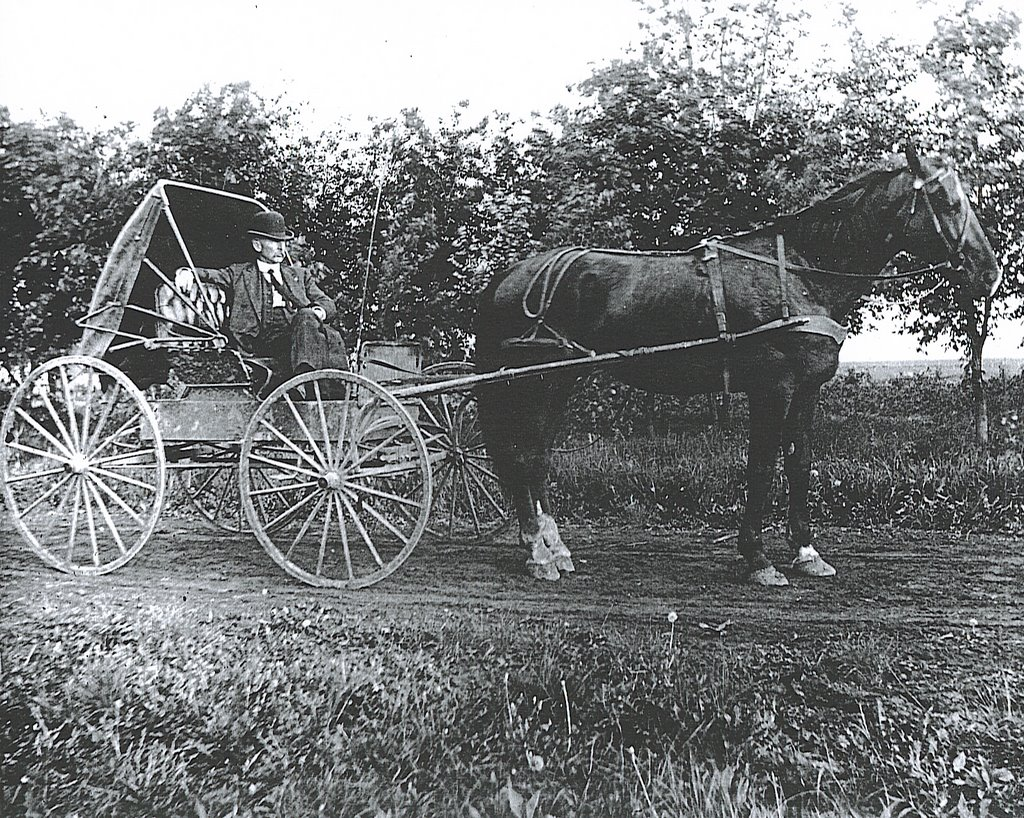
Frontier doctor Dr. Charles Boarman Harris, one of the original pioneers to settle in Pembina, was the first county physician. He delivered over 3,000 babies born in the region between 1882 and 1942.

For thousands of years, various indigenous peoples inhabited the area along the Pembina and Red rivers. At the time of European contact in the 16th century, the dominant tribes were the Assiniboine and the Lakota (or Sioux, as the French colonists called them). The Ojibwe, also known as Chippewa, a branch of the Anishinaabe-speaking language group, gradually migrated west along both sides of the Great Lakes. They developed a long trading relationship with French trappers and colonists. Throughout the Red River of the North area, French trappers married Native American women, and their descendants continued to hunt and trap. A large mixed-race population developed, recognized as an ethnic First Nations group in Canada called the Métis. The Ojibwe and Métis generally supported the French forces during the Seven Years' War in the mid-eighteenth century against Great Britain.

With the British defeat of France and takeover of its colonial territory, the Chippewa learned to deal with a new trading culture. Armed with guns by trading and having adopted the horse from the Mandan and Hidatsa, by the end of the eighteenth century the Chippewa had migrated from woodlands to the Great Plains and begun to push the Lakota west before them. By the time of the War of 1812, the Ojibwe allied with the British against the United States, hoping to forestall European-American settlers' encroaching on their territory. With the settlement of the northern boundary with Canada, the Chippewa within the Dakota Territory were forced to deal with the United States. During the first half of the nineteenth century, the Chippewa had continued conflicts with the Lakota along the Red River, finally pushing them into present-day western North and South Dakota.

Father George Belcourt, a Catholic Jesuit missionary who served them, described their territory in 1849 as the following

We understand here, that the district or department called Pembina, comprises all of the country or basin which is irrigated or traversed by the tributaries of the Red River, south of the line of the 49th parallel of latitude. The prairies' rivers and lakes which extend to the height of land of the Mississippi, and the immense plains which feed innumerable herds of bison to the westward and from which the Chippewa and half breeds [Métis] of this region obtain their subsistence, contains within their limits a country about 400 miles from north to south and more than five hundred miles from east to west.

The Métis used two-wheeled ox-drawn carts to transport furs to market along the Red River Trails, between what is now Winnipeg, Canada, and Mendota or St. Paul, Minnesota. They also used ox-carts to transport food and shelter during extended buffalo hunts.

Over time, the Ojibwe were persuaded to cede much of their land by treaty to the US, which in turn sold it to homesteaders. They moved to relatively small Indian reservations within their earlier territory.

The precursor to Pembina County was a county of the same name in the Minnesota Territory, extending from the Upper Mississippi River to the western boundary of the territory. When Minnesota became a state in 1858, its western boundary was set at the Red River, and the land to its west was unorganized. A new Pembina County was established as part of the Dakota Territory in 1867. At the time it was a large territory, and in 1871 it was expanded to include much of the territory in what is now eastern North Dakota from Canada to the South Dakota border.

The Dakota Territory legislature created Pembina County on January 9, 1867, from previously unorganized territory. Its government was organized on August 12 of that same year. It was named for a Chippewa term for stab or stabbing. Pembina, the oldest European-American settlement in the future state, was the county seat. In 1911 the seat was relocated to Cavalier.

The county boundaries were altered in 1871, 1873, 1881, and 1887. It has retained its present boundaries since 1887. Between 1873 and 1881, eleven new counties were created from Pembina, including Cass County and Grand Forks County. Pembina took its current form in 1887, when Cavalier County was increased in size.

Icelandic State Park is located in Pembina County. The first Icelandic immigrant settlement in present-day North Dakota was in Pembina County in the late 1870s, when a colony of settlers from Iceland moved into the county from the New Iceland homesteads near Lake Winnipeg.

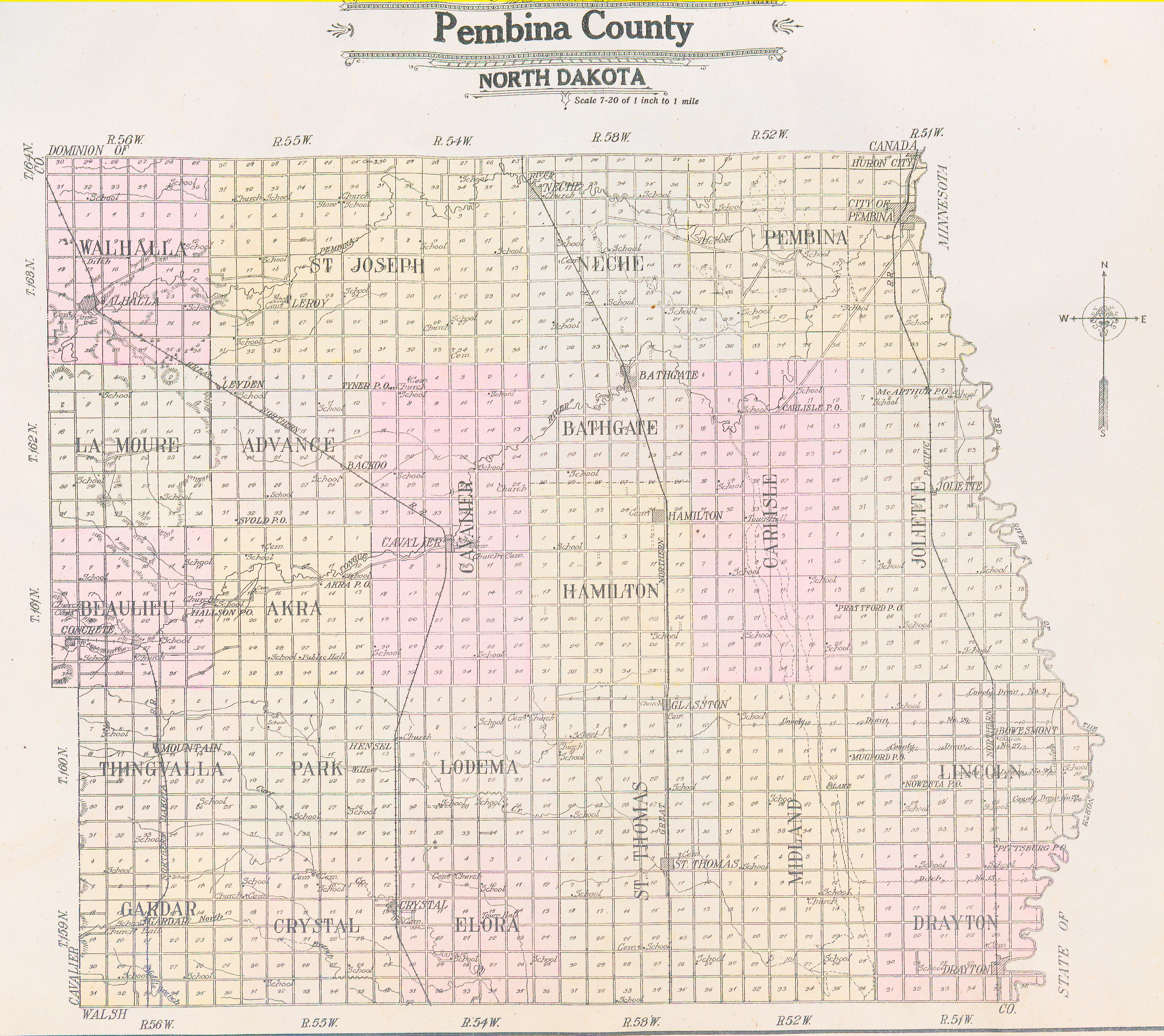
Outline map of Pembina County, North Dakota, 1909

The first Icelandic settlements in what is now North Dakota were established in Pembina County in the late 1870s. Many of the immigrants came from New Iceland near Lake Winnipeg, along with other Icelanders who moved into the area from colonies in Wisconsin. The new settlers lived primarily in the so-called "Icelandic Townships" of Akra, Beaulieu, Gardar, and Thingwalla. The State Historical Society of North Dakota reported fewer than 3 or 4 non-Icelandic families living there in the early 1900s. Evidence of this heritage is found in several township and city names with Icelandic origins. Akra was named after the town of Akranes, near Reykjavík; Gardar was named for Gardar Svavarsson, who was reportedly the first Scandinavian to visit Iceland; and Hallsson was named for an early settler, Johann P. Hallson.

Icelandic State Park was established to preserve evidence of this early pioneer heritage.

== Geography ==
Pembina County lies at the northeastern corner of North Dakota. Its northern boundary line abuts the southern boundary line of Canada and its eastern boundary line abuts the western boundary line of the state of Minnesota (across the Red River, which flows northward along the county's eastern boundary line). The Pembina River flows eastward through the upper portion of the county, discharging into the Red River near the northeastern county corner. The Tongue River flows northeastward through the upper portion of the county, discharging into the Pembina shortly before the Pembina joins the Red River. The county terrain consists of rolling hills, etched by river drainages. The area is devoted to agriculture. The terrain slopes to the east and north; its highest point is on the lower western boundary line, at 1,302 feet (397 m) above sea level.

According to the United States Census Bureau, the county has a total area of 1,121.241 square miles (2,904.00 km^{2}), of which 1,118.535 square miles (2,896.99 km^{2}) is land and 2.706 square miles (7.01 km^{2}) (0.24%) is water. It is the 32nd largest county in North Dakota by total area. The lowest point in the state of North Dakota is located on the Red River of the North in Pembina Township in Pembina County, where it flows out of North Dakota and into the Canada–US border of Manitoba.

=== Major highways ===
- Interstate 29
- U.S. Highway 81
- North Dakota Highway 5
- North Dakota Highway 18
- North Dakota Highway 32
- North Dakota Highway 44
- North Dakota Highway 66
- North Dakota Highway 89

=== Adjacent counties and rural municipalities ===
- Rural Municipality of Stanley, Manitoba, Canada - northwest
- Municipality of Rhineland, Manitoba, Canada - north
- Rural Municipality of Montcalm, Manitoba, Canada - northeast
- Kittson County, Minnesota - east
- Marshall County, Minnesota - southeast
- Walsh County - south
- Cavalier County - west

=== Protected areas ===
- Frost Fire Ski and Snow Board Area
- Houghton National Wildlife Management Area
- Icelandic State Park
- Juhl National Wildlife Management Area
- McDonald National Wildlife Management Area
- Pembina Gorge State Park
- Pembina Prairie National Wildlife Management Area
- Tetrault State Forest (part)

== Demographics ==
Historical population
Census	Pop.	Note	%±
1870	1,213		—
1880	4,862		300.8%
1890	14,334		194.8%
1900	17,869		24.7%
1910	14,749		−17.5%
1920	15,177		2.9%
1930	14,757		−2.8%
1940	15,671		6.2%
1950	13,990		−10.7%
1960	12,946		−7.5%
1970	10,728		−17.1%
1980	10,399		−3.1%
1990	9,238		−11.2%
2000	8,585		−7.1%
2010	7,413		−13.7%
2020	6,844		−7.7%
2025 (est.)	6,568	▼	−4.0%
U.S. Decennial Census; 1790–1960 1900–1990; 1990–2000 2010–2020

As of the fourth quarter of 2024, the median home value in Pembina County was $123,544.

As of the 2023 American Community Survey, there are 2,959 estimated households in Pembina County with an average of 2.23 persons per household. The county has a median household income of $66,884. Approximately 8.9% of the county's population lives at or below the poverty line. Pembina County has an estimated 58.5% employment rate, with 22.9% of the population holding a bachelor's degree or higher and 91.9% holding a high school diploma.

The median age in the county was 45.5 years.

Pembina County, North Dakota – racial and ethnic composition
Note: the US Census treats Hispanic/Latino as an ethnic category. This table excludes Latinos from the racial categories and assigns them to a separate category. Hispanics/Latinos may be of any race.

Race / ethnicity (NH = non-Hispanic)	Pop. 1980	Pop. 1990	Pop. 2000	Pop. 2010	Pop. 2020
White alone (NH)	10,188 (97.97%)	8,978 (97.19%)	8,058 (93.86%)	6,947 (93.71%)	6,096 (89.07%)
Black or African American alone (NH)	5 (0.05%)	14 (0.15%)	12 (0.14%)	21 (0.28%)	27 (0.39%)
Native American or Alaska Native alone (NH)	50 (0.48%)	146 (1.58%)	121 (1.41%)	143 (1.93%)	133 (1.94%)
Asian alone (NH)	23 (0.22%)	12 (0.13%)	18 (0.21%)	11 (0.15%)	27 (0.39%)
Pacific Islander alone (NH)	—	—	0 (0.00%)	2 (0.03%)	0 (0.00%)
Other race alone (NH)	7 (0.07%)	1 (0.01%)	4 (0.05%)	3 (0.04%)	22 (0.32%)
Mixed race or multiracial (NH)	—	—	108 (1.26%)	96 (1.30%)	296 (4.32%)
Hispanic or Latino (any race)	126 (1.21%)	87 (0.94%)	264 (3.08%)	190 (2.56%)	243 (3.55%)
Total	10,399 (100.00%)	9,238 (100.00%)	8,585 (100.00%)	7,413 (100.00%)	6,844 (100.00%)

=== 2024 estimate ===
As of the 2024 estimate, there were 6,588 people and 2,959 households residing in the county. There were 3,492 housing units at an average density of 3.13 per square mile (1.2/km^{2}). The racial makeup of the county was 93.0% White (88.7% NH White), 1.0% African American, 2.7% Native American, 0.6% Asian, 0.0% Pacific Islander, _% from some other races and 2.6% from two or more races. Hispanic or Latino people of any race were 4.9% of the population.

=== 2020 census ===
As of the 2020 census, the county had a population of 6,844. Of the residents, 21.6% were under the age of 18 and 24.9% were 65 years of age or older; the median age was 47.1 years. For every 100 females there were 109.9 males, and for every 100 females age 18 and over there were 107.7 males.

There were 3,003 households and 1,872 families residing in the county.

The population density was 6.1 inhabitants per square mile (2.4/km^{2}); there were 3,499 housing units at an average density of 3.13 per square mile (1.2/km^{2}). Of those units, 14.2% were vacant and, among occupied housing units, 78.4% were owner-occupied and 21.6% were renter-occupied. The homeowner vacancy rate was 2.1% and the rental vacancy rate was 13.9%.

The racial makeup of the county was 90.2% White, 0.4% African American, 2.0% Native American, 0.4% Asian, 0.0% Pacific Islander, 1.1% from some other races and 5.9% from two or more races. Hispanic or Latino people of any race were 3.6% of the population.

The most commonly reported ancestries were German (30.8%), Norwegian (19.4%), English (14.8%), Irish (14.5%), French (8.4%), and Icelandic (7.1%).

Of those households, 24.4% had children under the age of 18 living with them, 19.3% had a female householder with no spouse or partner present, and about 33.1% of all households were made up of individuals. Some 15.9% of households had someone living alone who was 65 years of age or older.

=== 2010 census ===
As of the 2010 census, there were 7,413 people, 3,257 households, and 2,069 families in the county. The population density was 6.62 inhabitants per square mile (2.6/km^{2}). There were 3,859 housing units at an average density of 3.45 per square mile (1.3/km^{2}). The racial makeup of the county was 95.47% White, 0.28% African American, 1.94% Native American, 0.15% Asian, 0.03% Pacific Islander, 0.78% from some other races and 1.35% from two or more races. Hispanic or Latino people of any race were 2.56% of the population.

In terms of ancestry, 33.8% were German, 21.3% were Norwegian, 10.6% were Irish, 9.5% were English, 8.0% were American, and 5.5% were Swedish.

There were 3,257 households, 24.5% had children under the age of 18 living with them, 54.2% were married couples living together, 5.6% had a female householder with no husband present, 36.5% were non-families, and 32.4% of all households were made up of individuals. The average household size was 2.23 and the average family size was 2.82. The median age was 46.7 years.

The median income for a household in the county was $48,502 and the median income for a family was $61,804. Males had a median income of $40,334 versus $29,662 for females. The per capita income for the county was $27,019. About 4.0% of families and 8.0% of the population were below the poverty line, including 9.5% of those under age 18 and 11.3% of those age 65 or over.

== Communities ==
=== Cities ===
- Bathgate
- Canton City
- Cavalier (county seat)
- Crystal
- Drayton
- Hamilton
- Mountain
- Neche
- Pembina
- St. Thomas
- Walhalla

=== Unincorporated communities ===
- Backoo
- Gardar
- Glasston
- Hallson
- Joliette

=== Townships ===
- Advance
- Akra
- Bathgate
- Beaulieu
- Carlisle
- Cavalier
- Crystal
- Drayton
- Elora
- Felson
- Gardar
- Hamilton
- Joliette
- La Moure
- Lincoln
- Lodema
- Midland
- Neche
- Park
- Pembina
- St. Joseph
- St. Thomas
- Thingvalla
- Walhalla

=== American Indian reservations ===
- Pembina Band of Chippewa Indians
- Turtle Mountain Band of Chippewa Indians

=== Ghost Town ===
- Bowesmont
- Concrete

== Politics ==
Pembina County voters have traditionally backed the Republican Party. In only one national election since 1948 has the county selected the Democratic Party candidate (as of 2024).

United States presidential election results for Pembina County, North Dakota
Year	Republican		Democratic		Third party(ies)	
Year	No.	%	No.	%	No.	%
1900	1,732	55.34%	1,321	42.20%	77	2.46%
1904	1,870	70.01%	743	27.82%	58	2.17%
1908	1,389	52.55%	1,185	44.84%	69	2.61%
1912	615	24.75%	975	39.24%	895	36.02%
1916	1,469	50.71%	1,400	48.33%	28	0.97%
1920	3,925	73.24%	1,405	26.22%	29	0.54%
1924	2,783	59.02%	588	12.47%	1,344	28.50%
1928	3,324	60.75%	2,141	39.13%	7	0.13%
1932	1,911	34.19%	3,636	65.04%	43	0.77%
1936	2,040	31.48%	4,139	63.86%	302	4.66%
1940	2,924	43.94%	3,711	55.76%	20	0.30%
1944	2,410	44.95%	2,903	54.15%	48	0.90%
1948	2,406	46.67%	2,666	51.72%	83	1.61%
1952	4,012	67.50%	1,891	31.81%	41	0.69%
1956	3,077	61.82%	1,887	37.91%	13	0.26%
1960	3,348	57.62%	2,460	42.34%	2	0.03%
1964	1,961	37.95%	3,198	61.89%	8	0.15%
1968	2,574	56.01%	1,686	36.68%	336	7.31%
1972	3,317	63.75%	1,801	34.61%	85	1.63%
1976	2,810	53.95%	2,274	43.66%	125	2.40%
1980	3,101	65.73%	1,239	26.26%	378	8.01%
1984	2,895	65.99%	1,367	31.16%	125	2.85%
1988	2,471	59.56%	1,616	38.95%	62	1.49%
1992	1,917	46.45%	1,186	28.74%	1,024	24.81%
1996	1,678	50.94%	1,191	36.16%	425	12.90%
2000	2,430	64.30%	1,093	28.92%	256	6.77%
2004	2,466	63.95%	1,321	34.26%	69	1.79%
2008	1,722	52.07%	1,494	45.18%	91	2.75%
2012	1,899	58.34%	1,253	38.49%	103	3.16%
2016	2,208	70.03%	681	21.60%	264	8.37%
2020	2,460	73.85%	786	23.60%	85	2.55%
2024	2,350	75.51%	704	22.62%	58	1.86%

== See also ==
- National Register of Historic Places listings in Pembina County, North Dakota
