= Tongue River (North Dakota) =

River in North Dakota, United States

Coordinates: 48°56′10″N 97°18′10″W

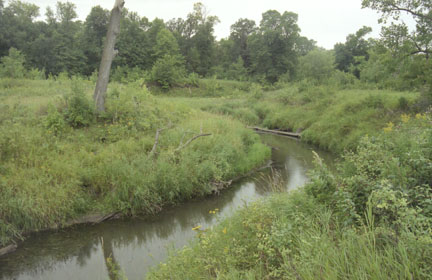
The Tongue River in Icelandic State Park

The Tongue River is a 90.4-mile-long (145.5 km) tributary of the Pembina River in northeastern North Dakota in the United States. It drains an area of the prairie country near the Canada–US border in the extreme northeast corner of the state in the watershed of the Red River.

It rises in eastern Cavalier County and flows in a direct course east-northeast into Pembina County, passing the towns of Cavalier, Neche and Bathgate. It joins the Pembina from the south approximately 2 miles (3 km) upstream from the mouth of the Pembina on the Red River.

Upstream of Cavalier, the river passes through Icelandic State Park, where Renwick Dam causes it to form Lake Renwick. Below the dam, foot trails follow the river in the Gunlogson Arboretum Nature Preserve.

== See also ==
- List of North Dakota rivers
