= Cavalier, North Dakota =

- City
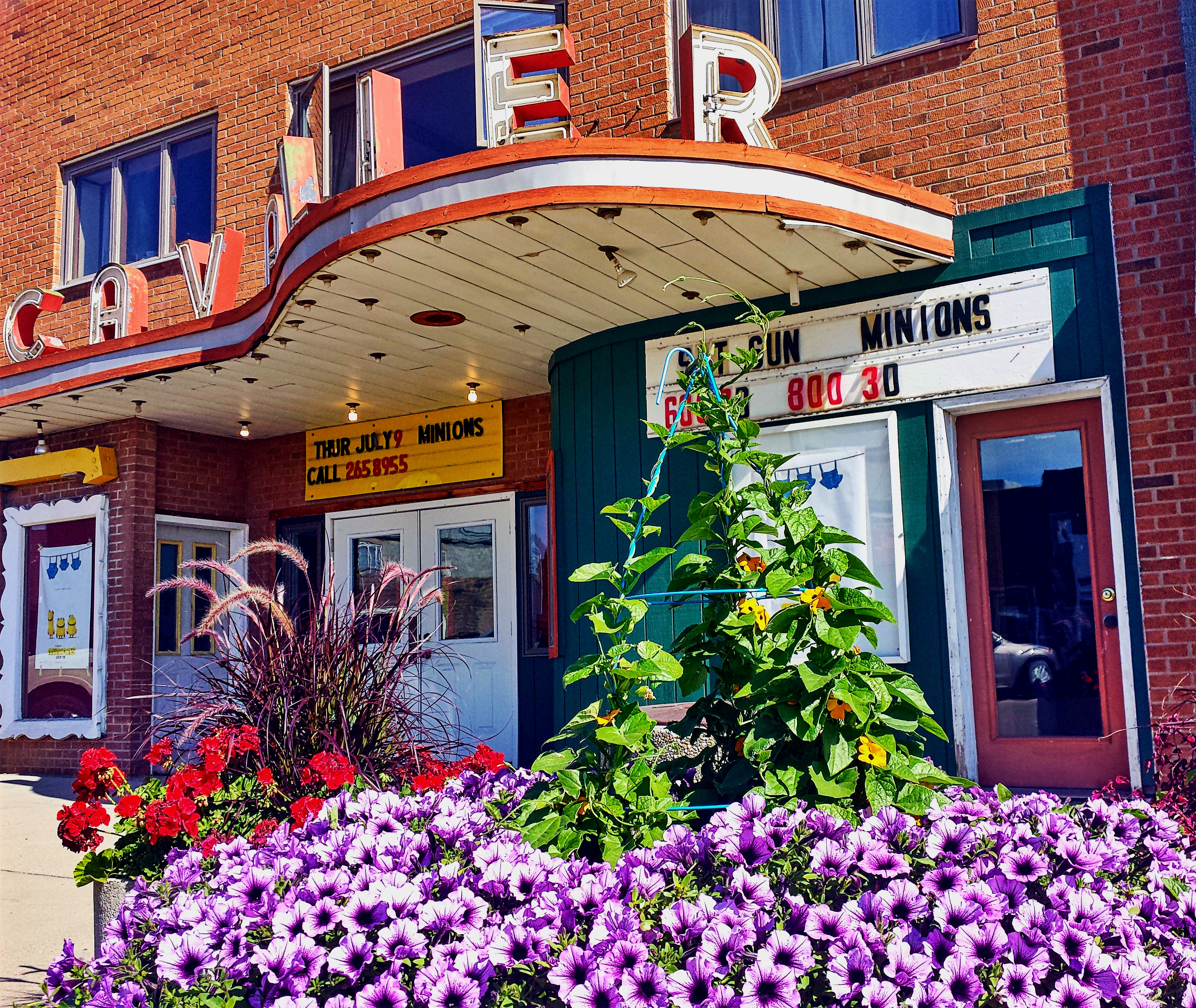

- Motto: "Four Seasons Many Reasons"
- Location of Cavalier, North Dakota
- Coordinates: 48°47′38″N 97°37′22″W
- Country: United States
- State: North Dakota
- County: Pembina
- Founded: 1875

Government
  - Mayor: Lacey Hinkle

Area
  - Total: 0.86 sq mi (2.23 km^{2})
  - Land: 0.86 sq mi (2.23 km^{2})
  - Water: 0 sq mi (0.00 km^{2})
- Elevation: 890 ft (270 m)

Population (2020)
  - Total: 1,246
  - Estimate (2022): 1,242
  - Density: 1,446.4/sq mi (558.46/km^{2})
- Time zone: UTC-6 (Central (CST))
  - Summer (DST): UTC-5 (CDT)
- ZIP code: 58220
- Area code: 701
- FIPS code: 38-12940
- GNIS feature ID: 1035959
- Highways: ND 5, ND 18
- Website: cavaliernd.gov

Cavalier is the largest city in Pembina County, North Dakota, United States. It is the county seat of Pembina County. The population was 1,246 at the 2020 census. Cavalier was founded in 1875 and became the county seat in 1911. Icelandic State Park is located 6 miles west of Cavalier, is also home to Lake Renwick.

Although there is the county to the west of Pembina named Cavalier County, Cavalier is not located in nearby Cavalier County. The Tongue River flows past Cavalier and Cavalier Space Force Station is located approximately 14 miles southwest of the city.

== History ==
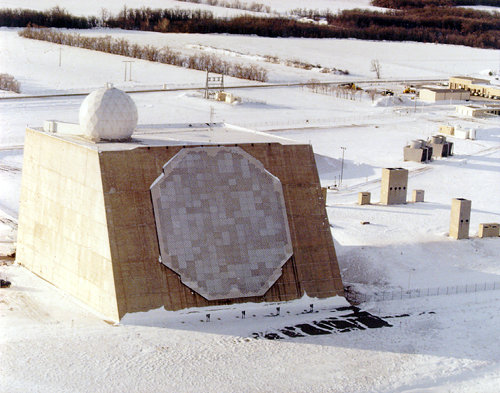
Cavalier Air Force Station

Cavalier was laid out in 1875 on open land. The city was named for Charles Cavileer, an early settler in Pembina County (a recording error accounts for the error in spelling, which was never corrected). A post office has been in operation at Cavalier since 1877. Cavalier was incorporated in 1902.

In the early 1970s, the city of Cavalier's population quadrupled in size due to the U.S.' anti-ballistic missile program. This was in preparation of a nuclear attack on the U.S. during the Cold War with the Soviet Union.

== Geography ==
=== Climate ===
According to the United States Census Bureau, the city has a total area of 0.82 square miles (2.12 km^{2}), all land.

Cavalier has a warm-summer humid continental climate (Koppen: Dwb). Summers are warm, sometimes hot, while winters are very cold, sometimes severely cold. Precipitation is mostly confined to late spring into early fall and peaks in June. Winter is very dry with little precipitation, almost always in the form of snow.

Climate data for Cavalier 7NW, North Dakota (1991–2020 normals, extremes 1934–present)
Month	Jan	Feb	Mar	Apr	May	Jun	Jul	Aug	Sep	Oct	Nov	Dec	Year
Record high °F (°C)	52 (11)	61 (16)	78 (26)	97 (36)	98 (37)	105 (41)	110 (43)	103 (39)	103 (39)	93 (34)	75 (24)	63 (17)	110 (43)
Mean daily maximum °F (°C)	13.2 (−10.4)	18.0 (−7.8)	30.7 (−0.7)	49.3 (9.6)	64.5 (18.1)	73.6 (23.1)	77.5 (25.3)	77.4 (25.2)	68.2 (20.1)	51.8 (11.0)	33.6 (0.9)	19.5 (−6.9)	48.1 (8.9)
Daily mean °F (°C)	4.4 (−15.3)	8.5 (−13.1)	22.1 (−5.5)	38.9 (3.8)	52.7 (11.5)	63.2 (17.3)	67.1 (19.5)	65.5 (18.6)	56.5 (13.6)	42.1 (5.6)	25.5 (−3.6)	11.4 (−11.4)	38.2 (3.4)
Mean daily minimum °F (°C)	−4.3 (−20.2)	−1.0 (−18.3)	13.4 (−10.3)	28.5 (−1.9)	40.9 (4.9)	52.7 (11.5)	56.6 (13.7)	53.5 (11.9)	44.7 (7.1)	32.3 (0.2)	17.3 (−8.2)	3.3 (−15.9)	28.2 (−2.1)
Record low °F (°C)	−41 (−41)	−41 (−41)	−31 (−35)	−10 (−23)	9 (−13)	28 (−2)	35 (2)	24 (−4)	19 (−7)	−2 (−19)	−33 (−36)	−37 (−38)	−41 (−41)
Average precipitation inches (mm)	0.34 (8.6)	0.34 (8.6)	0.71 (18)	1.11 (28)	2.87 (73)	3.77 (96)	3.44 (87)	2.25 (57)	2.31 (59)	1.66 (42)	0.72 (18)	0.50 (13)	20.02 (509)
Average snowfall inches (cm)	7.4 (19)	4.6 (12)	5.7 (14)	3.4 (8.6)	0.9 (2.3)	0.0 (0.0)	0.0 (0.0)	0.0 (0.0)	0.0 (0.0)	2.5 (6.4)	5.9 (15)	8.7 (22)	39.1 (99)
Average precipitation days (≥ 0.01 in)	5.0	4.1	4.7	5.2	10.3	12.0	10.5	8.5	8.0	7.0	4.8	5.8	85.9
Average snowy days (≥ 0.1 in)	5.2	3.9	3.5	1.8	0.3	0.0	0.0	0.0	0.0	0.9	3.2	5.9	24.7
Source: NOAA

== Demographics ==
Historical population
Census	Pop.	Note	%±
1900	671		—
1910	652		−2.8%
1920	819		25.6%
1930	850		3.8%
1940	1,105		30.0%
1950	1,459		32.0%
1960	1,423		−2.5%
1970	1,381		−3.0%
1980	1,505		9.0%
1990	1,508		0.2%
2000	1,537		1.9%
2010	1,302		−15.3%
2020	1,246		−4.3%
2022 (est.)	1,242		−0.3%
U.S. Decennial Census; 2020 Census

=== 2020 census ===
Cavalier city, North Dakota – Racial composition Note: the US Census treats Hispanic/Latino as an ethnic category. This table excludes Latinos from the racial categories and assigns them to a separate category. Hispanics/Latinos may be of any race.
Race (NH = Non-Hispanic)	% 2020	% 2010	% 2000	Pop 2020	Pop 2010	Pop 2000
White alone (NH)	91.5%	93.2%	92.5%	1,140	1,213	1,421
Black alone (NH)	0.4%	0%	0.4%	5	0	6
American Indian alone (NH)	0.6%	2.2%	1%	8	28	16
Asian alone (NH)	0.7%	0.2%	0.5%	9	2	8
Pacific Islander alone (NH)	0%	0.2%	0%	0	2	0
Other race alone (NH)	0%	0.1%	0%	0	1	0
Multiracial (NH)	3.6%	1.6%	1.3%	45	21	20
Hispanic/Latino (any race)	3.1%	2.7%	4.3%	39	35	66

The most reported ancestries in 2020 were:

- German (32.5%)
- Norwegian (20.5%)
- Irish (14.6%)
- English (14.4%)
- Icelandic (7.5%)
- French (7.1%)
- Scottish (6.2%)
- Swedish (4.6%)
- Polish (3.7%)
- Mexican (3.7%)

=== 2010 census ===
As of the census of 2010, there were 1,302 people, 641 households and 333 families living in the city. The population density was 1,587.8 inhabitants per square mile (613.1/km^{2}). There were 723 housing units at an average density of 881.7 per square mile (340.4/km^{2}). The racial makeup of the city was 95.4% White, 2.2% Native American, 0.2% Asian, 0.2% Pacific Islander, 0.2% from other races, and 1.9% from two or more races. Hispanic or Latino of any race were 2.7% of the population.

There were 641 households, of which 19.8% had children under the age of 18 living with them, 40.9% were married couples living together, 8.9% had a female householder with no husband present, 2.2% had a male householder with no wife present, and 48.0% were non-families. 43.2% of all households were made up of individuals, and 18.1% had someone living alone who was 65 years of age or older. The average household size was 1.95 and the average family size was 2.69.

The median age in the city was 47.3 years. 18.5% of residents were under the age of 18; 8% were between the ages of 18 and 24; 19.6% were from 25 to 44; 26.2% were from 45 to 64; and 27.6% were 65 years of age or older. The gender makeup of the city was 47.5% male and 52.5% female.

=== 2000 census ===
As of the census of 2000, there were 1,537 people, 679 households and 399 families living in the city. The population density was 1,938.1 inhabitants per square mile (748.3/km^{2}). There were 750 housing units at an average density of 945.7 per square mile (365.1/km^{2}). The racial makeup of the city was 94.27% White, 0.46% African American, 1.04% Native American, 0.52% Asian, 2.08% from other races, and 1.63% from two or more races. Hispanic or Latino of any race were 4.29% of the population.

There were 679 households, of which 26.7% had children under the age of 18 living with them, 50.4% were married couples living together, 6.3% had a female householder with no husband present, and 41.1% were non-families. 38.4% of all households were made up of individuals, and 21.8% had someone living alone who was 65 years of age or older. The average household size was 2.17 and the average family size was 2.92.

22.8% of the population were under the age of 18, 7.2% from 18 to 24, 24.3% from 25 to 44, 21.0% from 45 to 64, and 24.8% who were 65 years of age or older. The median age was 42 years. For every 100 females, there were 88.8 males. For every 100 females age 18 and over, there were 85.8 males.

The median household income was $35,667 and the median family income was $48,450. Males had a median income of $30,313 compared with $21,548 for females. The per capita income for the city was $19,586. About 7.8% of families and 9.3% of the population were below the poverty line, including 7.0% of those under age 18 and 9.9% of those age 65 or over.

Based on data from the 2000 Census, 6.8% of Cavalier's population is of Icelandic ancestry, making Cavalier the city with the highest proportion of Icelandic residents in the United States.

== Sites of interest ==
- Icelandic State Park is a public recreation area located on Renwick Dam five miles (8.0 km) west of Cavalier in Akra Township, Pembina County, North Dakota. It includes Lake Renwick and the Gunlogson Arboretum Nature Preserve, which are used for various recreation activities.

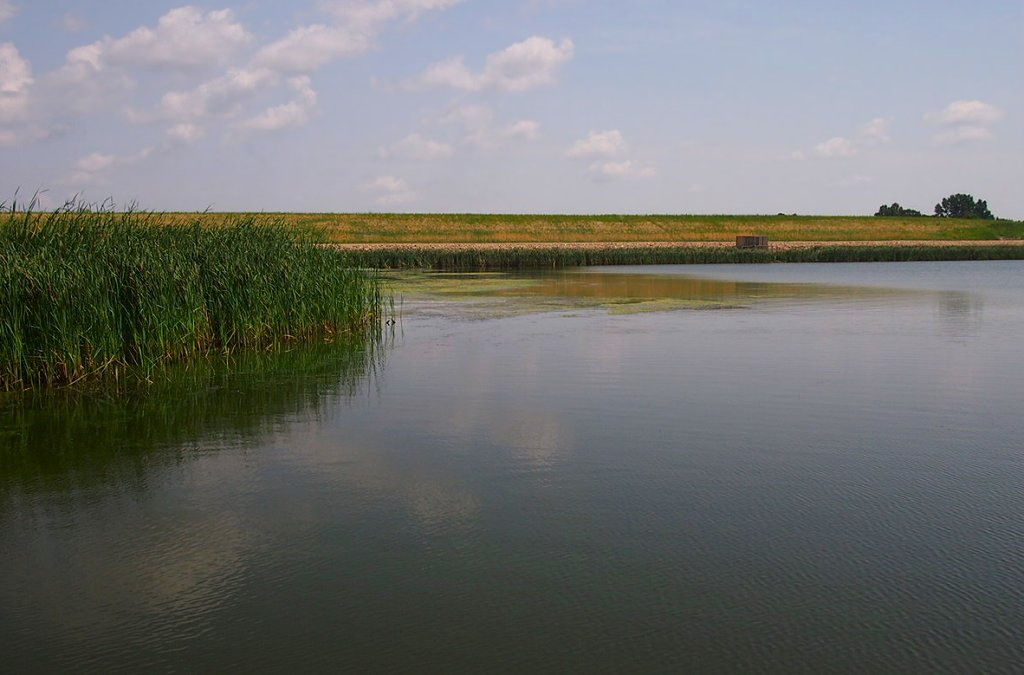
Lake Renwick

- Frost Fire Ski and Snow Board Area is located outside of nearby Walhalla, North Dakota, and includes tubing and an outdoor amphitheater.
- The Cavalier Space Force Station is located about 14 miles Southwest of Cavalier. It was built in the early 1970s. It provides critical missile warning and space surveillance data to various government agencies. Approximately 30 military along with several civil service people are stationed on the base.
- The Pembina Gorge State Park is a unit of the North Dakota state park system located along the Pembina River that provides a 12 mi (19 km) looped trail for hiking as well as riding ATVs, dirt bikes and snowmobiles.
- Built in 1912, the Pembina County Courthouse was listed on the National Register of Historic Places in 1980.
- The Historic Cavalier Movie Theater
- Pembina County Memorial Hospital
- Cavalier Country Club
- Cavalier Arena
- Cavalier Swimming Pool

== Events ==
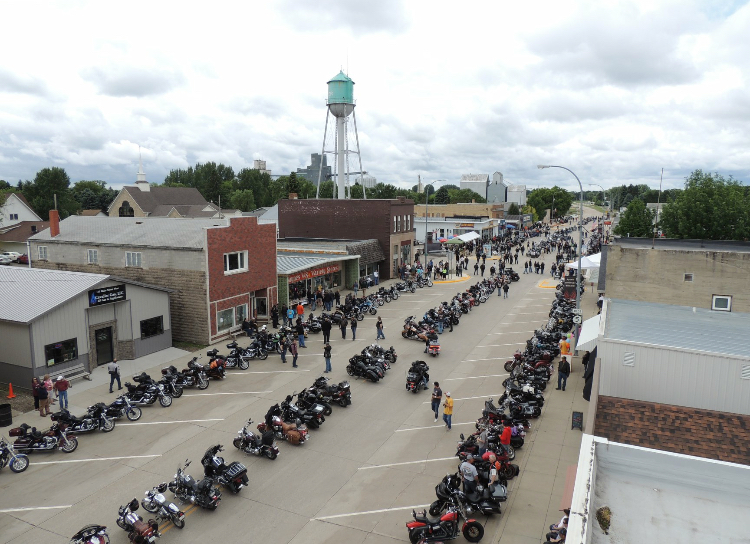
- The Annual Cavalier Motorcycle Ride In
  The Cavalier Motorcycle Ride-In occurs every Father's Day weekend and brings in thousands of motorcycles and spectators from the upper midwest and Canada. This event has been called the "Little Sturgis of the North" and has been held every year for more than 20 years.
- Off The Charts Festival is a free Christian Music Festival held every August featuring national acts.
- The Pembina County Fair has been held annually in nearby Hamilton, North Dakota for more than 125 years.

== Education ==
=== Cavalier Public School ===
The city of Cavalier is served by Cavalier Public School (K–12). The 2017–2018 K–12 fall enrollment was 411. The school's athletic teams are known as the Tornadoes. Team colors are orange and black.

=== High school championships ===
- North Dakota Class B high school baseball: 2002, 2003, 2004
- North Dakota Class B high school football: 1987
- North Dakota Class AA high school football: 2002, 2003, 2004
- North Dakota Class B 9-man football: 2013, 2014

From 2002 to 2005, the Cavalier Tornadoes football team, led by coach Rod Oksendahl (1978–2005), had a 47-game winning streak, the second longest winning streak in North Dakota high school football history. The streak ended when the Tornadoes lost to the Velva-Sawyer Aggies in the 2005 State Class 'A' championship game.

== Media ==
The Cavalier Chronicle, a weekly news publication which began operation in 1885, is the oldest business in Cavalier. It is the official newspaper of Pembina County.

== Notable people ==
- William Costello, animal scientist
- Ashley Ford, Miss North Dakota 2004
- Rob Hunt, selected by the Indianapolis Colts in the fifth round of the 2005 NFL draft
- John Kobs, men's baseball, basketball, and ice hockey coach at Michigan State University (1924–1963)
- Rodney Scott Webb, federal judge
