= Bathgate, North Dakota =

Bathgate
- City
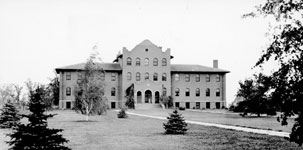
- North Dakota School for the Blind in 1908

- Location of Bathgate, North Dakota
- Coordinates: 48°52′49″N 97°28′26″W
- Country: United States
- State: North Dakota
- County: Pembina
- Founded: 1881

Area
  - Total: 0.28 sq mi (0.72 km^{2})
  - Land: 0.28 sq mi (0.72 km^{2})
  - Water: 0 sq mi (0.00 km^{2})
- Elevation: 820 ft (250 m)

Population (2020)
  - Total: 47
  - Estimate (2022): 48
  - Density: 170/sq mi (65.5/km^{2})
- Time zone: UTC–6 (Central (CST))
  - Summer (DST): UTC–5 (CDT)
- ZIP Code: 58216
- Area code: 701
- FIPS code: 38-05260
- GNIS feature ID: 1035924

Bathgate is a city in Pembina County, North Dakota, United States. It sits on the banks of the Tongue River. The population was 47 at the 2020 census. Bathgate was founded in 1881. In 1908, the North Dakota School for the Blind was placed in Bathgate. The building still stands and is now occupied by a publishing company. Bathgate was the childhood home of former world-champion speed skater and figure skater Norval Baptie.

== History ==
Bathgate was originally called Bayview, and was laid out under that name in 1879. The present name, after Bathgate, Scotland, was adopted in 1881. A post office called Bathgate has been in operation since that year.

In June 1909, Bathgate experienced an 11-hour thunderstorm that destroyed several buildings and killed a number of horses. Understandably, many of the citizens are still in mourning of this event, and often practice 'moments of silence' to honor the dead horses and fallen buildings.

The 1996 Coen Brothers film Fargo has an unexpected connection to Bathgate. During filming in early 1995, the production moved north to Pembina County in search of snowier landscapes. A 25-foot Paul Bunyan statue with a "Welcome to Brainerd" sign was erected along Pembina County Highway 1, about four miles west of Bathgate, for a police chase scene. The sudden appearance of the prop baffled locals. "It was foggy, and people couldn't see it until they got right up to it," recalled Reinhold Henschel, owner of Reiny's Bar. "Then, it says, 'Brainerd,' and they thought, 'What the hell?'"

Notable people from Bathgate include artist George Michael Gaethke.

== Geography ==
According to the United States Census Bureau, the town has a total area of 0.27 square miles (0.70 km^{2}), all land.

== Demographics ==
Historical population
Census	Pop.	Note	%±
1890	377		—
1900	641		70.0%
1910	328		−48.8%
1920	352		7.3%
1930	292		−17.0%
1940	312		6.8%
1950	209		−33.0%
1960	175		−16.3%
1970	133		−24.0%
1980	67		−49.6%
1990	75		11.9%
2000	66		−12.0%
2010	43		−34.8%
2020	47		9.3%
2022 (est.)	48		2.1%
U.S. Decennial Census; 2020 Census

=== 2010 census ===
As of the census of 2010, there were 43 people, 22 households, and 11 families residing in the town. The population density was 159.3 inhabitants per square mile (61.5/km^{2}). There were 25 housing units at an average density of 92.6 per square mile (35.8/km^{2}). The racial makeup of the town was 95.3% White and 4.7% Native American. Hispanic or Latino of any race were 2.3% of the population.

There were 22 households, of which 27.3% had children under the age of 18 living with them, 40.9% were married couples living together, 4.5% had a female householder with no husband present, 4.5% had a male householder with no wife present, and 50.0% were non-families. 45.5% of all households were made up of individuals, and 22.7% had someone living alone who was 65 years of age or older. The average household size was 1.95 and the average family size was 2.64.

The median age in the town was 49.5 years. 18.6% of residents were under the age of 18; 2.4% were between the ages of 18 and 24; 23.3% were from 25 to 44; 37.2% were from 45 to 64; and 18.6% were 65 years of age or older. The gender makeup of the city was 51.2% male and 48.8% female.

=== 2000 census ===
As of the census of 2000, there were 66 people, 25 households, and 18 families residing in the town. The population density was 206.2 inhabitants per square mile (79.6/km^{2}). There were 28 housing units at an average density of 87.5 per square mile (33.8/km^{2}). The racial makeup of the town was 83.33% White, 13.64% Native American, and 3.03% from two or more races.

There were 25 households, out of which 32.0% had children under the age of 18 living with them, 68.0% were married couples living together, 4.0% had a female householder with no husband present, and 28.0% were non-families. 28.0% of all households were made up of individuals, and 8.0% had someone living alone who was 65 years of age or older. The average household size was 2.64 and the average family size was 3.28.

In the city, the population was spread out, with 30.3% under the age of 18, 6.1% from 18 to 24, 33.3% from 25 to 44, 18.2% from 45 to 64, and 12.1% who were 65 years of age or older. The median age was 36 years. For every 100 females, there were 78.4 males. For every 100 females age 18 and over, there were 84.0 males.

The median income for a household in the town was $36,250, and the median income for a family was $51,250. Males had a median income of $37,750 versus $17,083 for females. The per capita income for the city was $13,593. There were 8.7% of families and 4.5% of the population living below the poverty line, including no under eighteens and 33.3% of those over 64.
