= Renwick Dam =

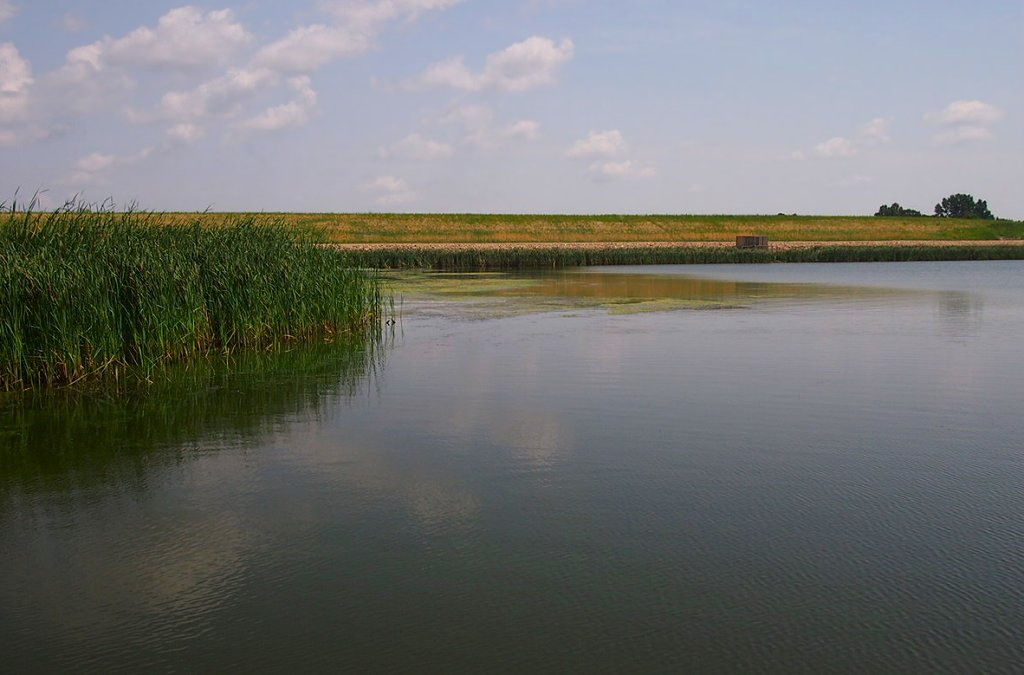
- Renwick Dam in Icelandic State Park

- Location in North Dakota
- Location: Pembina County, North Dakota, United States
- Coordinates: 48°46′37″N 97°44′51″W
- Type: Reservoir
- Primary inflows: Tongue River
- Primary outflows: Tongue River
- Basin countries: United States
- Max. length: 1.5 miles (2.4 km)
- Max. width: 1,340 feet (410 m)
- Surface area: 180.5 acres (73.0 ha)
- Average depth: 7.2 feet (2.2 m)
- Max. depth: 17.7 feet (5.4 m)
- Water volume: 1,300.1 acre⋅ft (1,603,600 m^{3})
- Shore length^{1}: 5 miles (8.0 km)
- Surface elevation: 971 ft (296 m)
- ^{1} Shore length is not a well-defined measure.

Renwick Dam (National ID # ND00054) is a dam in Akra Township, Pembina County, North Dakota, USA, in the northeastern corner of the state.

The earthen dam was completed in 1962 at a height of 49 feet (15 m) and a length of 1,400 feet (430 m) at its crest. It impounds the Tongue River for flood control and recreation. Both dam and reservoir are owned and operated by the Pembina County Water Resource District.

The reservoir it creates, Lake Renwick, has a water surface of 204 acres (83 ha), a maximum capacity of 8400 acre-feet, and normal storage of 1226 acre-feet. Recreation includes fishing and visiting the adjacent Icelandic State Park, established to preserve evidence of the Icelandic heritage in North Dakota. The Cavalier Country Club, a 9-hole public golf course, borders the southeast shore of the lake.

== 2013 flood ==
On May 19–21, 2013, a major rainstorm dropped from 5 to nearly 10 inches of rain on southwest Pembina county causing streams and rivers to overflow their banks. The pool level behind Renwick rose at a clip of nearly 6" per hour on 21 May which led the city of Cavalier, approximately six miles east of the dam, to be evacuated due to concerns about the structural integrity of an emergency levee built over the dam. Local contractors built an 8 foot high, 300 foot wide levee on top the existing emergency spillway in hopes of staving off a disastrous dam failure which could flood the downstream towns of Akra, Cavalier, and Bathgate.
