= Icelandic State Park =

Park in North Dakota, USA

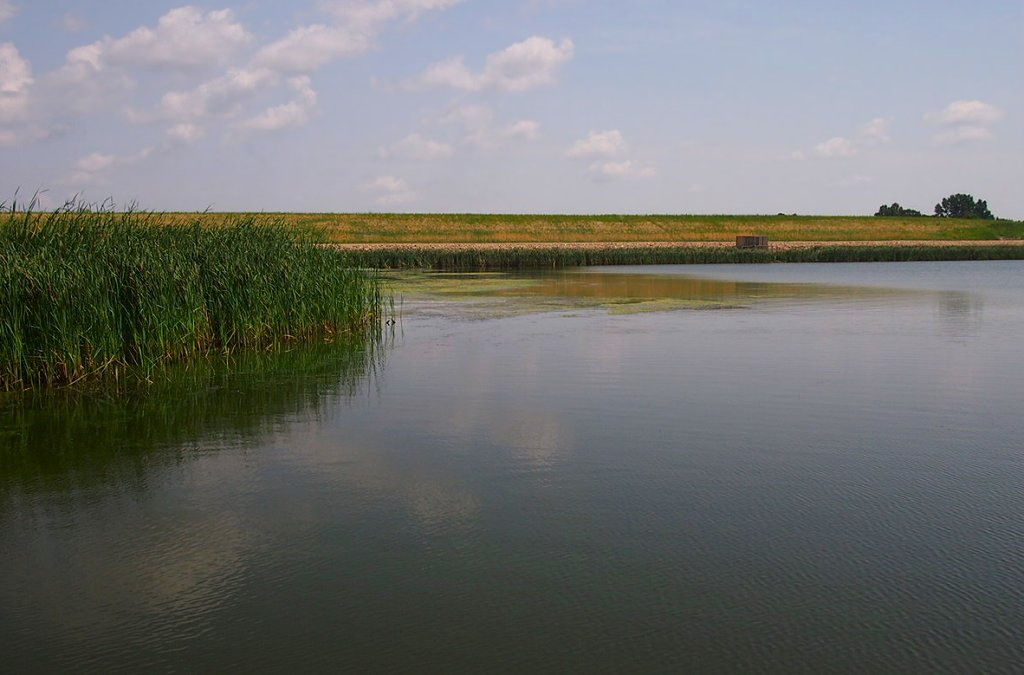
- Lake Renwick and Renwick Dam

- Location within North Dakota Location within the United States
- Location: Pembina County, North Dakota, United States
- Nearest city: Cavalier, North Dakota
- Coordinates: 48°46′43″N 97°45′43″W
- Area: 930.3 acres (376.5 ha)
- Elevation: 971 ft (296 m)
- Established: 1964
- Administrator: North Dakota Parks and Recreation Department
- Designation: North Dakota state park
- Website: Official website

Icelandic State Park is a public recreation area on the north shore of Lake Renwick, six miles (9.7 km) west of Cavalier in Akra Township, Pembina County, North Dakota. The state park encompasses more than 900 acres (360 ha), two hundred of which are wooded. The park features a beach, museum, historic buildings, the Pioneer Heritage Center, and the Gunlogson State Nature Preserve.

== History ==
The park was established in 1964 to preserve evidence of North Dakota's Icelandic heritage after G. B. Gunlogson (1887-1983) donated 200 acres (81 ha) of his family's lands to the state in 1963. The land had been in the Gunlogson family for over 80 years when it was donated to North Dakota.

== Activities ==
The park offers camping, fishing, swimming, kayaking, and boating. The nature preserve has three miles of trails for hiking and cross-country skiing. The 6-mile-long Cavlandic Trail connects the park and the city of Cavalier. The park sits adjacent to the Cavalier Country Club, a 9-hole public golf course.

== Nature preserve ==
The Gunlogson State Nature Preserve is an arboretum and nature preserve dominated by mature elm and basswood that lies along both banks of the Tongue River. The preserve's many rare species include plants such as the ladyfern, water arum, and two-seeded sedge and animals that include the piliated woodpecker, western wood pewee, and the finescale dace.

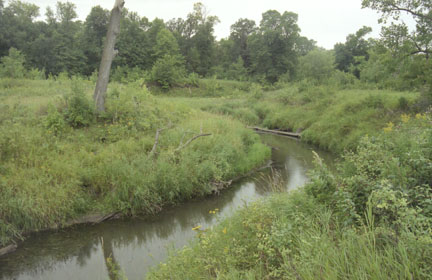
The Tongue River through Gunlogson State Nature Preserve

The preserve's woody plants include species of maple (Acer negundo), birch (Betula papyrifera), dogwood (Cornus stolonifera), hazel (Corylus cornuta), hawthorn (Crataegus rotundifolia), silverberry (Elaeagnus angustifolia), ash (Fraxinus pennsylvanica), quaking aspen (Populus tremuloides), balsam poplar (Populus balsamifera), chokecherry (Prunus virginiana), willow (Salix amygdaloides, Salix bebbiana), American linden (Tilia americana), and elm (Ulmus americana, Ulmus pumila). About a hundred other species are represented on the site.
