= Hallson, North Dakota =

- Unincorporated community
- Location within North Dakota Location within the United States
- Coordinates: 48°45′50″N 97°49′04″W
- Country: United States
- State: North Dakota
- County: Pembina
- Elevation: 1,014 ft (309 m)
- Time zone: UTC-6 (Central (CST))
  - Summer (DST): UTC-5 (CDT)
- Area code: 701
- GNIS feature ID: 1028097

Hallson was located on the eastern edge of Beaulieu Township, Pembina County, North Dakota, United States, just north of North Dakota Highway 5, approximately one mile east of its intersection with State Highway 32 going south. This area is no longer populated and for many years, its only residents were the family who operated a small general store and post office.

Hallson was established in 1878. The community was named after Jóhann Pétur Hallsson, an early Icelandic settler in the area who was probably the second or third postmaster after the post office was moved from its original location (and name) at Coulee. A post office was established at Hallson in 1882, and remained in operation until 1960.
