= Icelandic Evangelical Lutheran Church =

Historic church in North Dakota, United States

- U.S. National Register of Historic Places
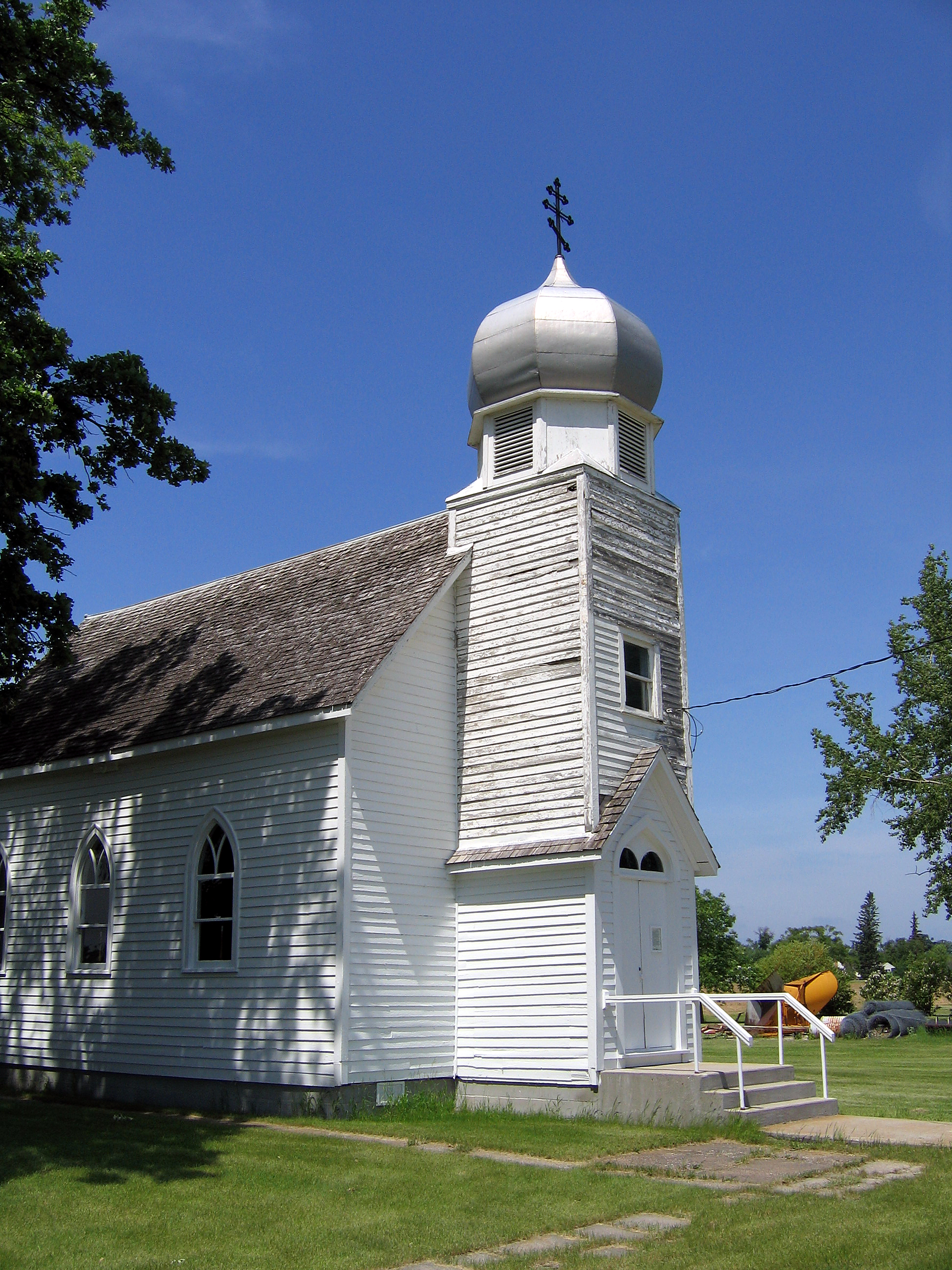

- Location within North Dakota Location within the United States
- Location: 415 Beaupre St., Pembina, North Dakota
- Coordinates: 48.962050°N 97.242929°W
- NRHP reference No.: 100004714
- Added to NRHP: December 5, 2019

St. John's Ukrainian Orthodox Church Museum is a historic building at 415 Beaupre Street (also known as Adelaide Street) in Pembina City in Pembina County, North Dakota. It was listed on the National Register of Historic Places in 2019 as the Icelandic Evangelical Lutheran Church.

The building was originally an Icelandic Evangelical Lutheran church. It became a Ukrainian Orthodox church in 1937 and an onion dome was later added above the front entry. The Fort Pembina Historical Society now operates it as a museum.

== See also ==
- Vikur Lutheran Church at Mountain, Mountain, North Dakota, also National Register-listed
