= Kristjan Niels Julius =

Icelandic poet

- Born: April 7, 1860; Akureyri, Iceland
- Died: October 25, 1936 (aged 76); Thingvalla Township, Pembina County, North Dakota
- Occupation: Poetry
- Writing career
- Genre: Satire

Kristjan Niels "K. N." Julius (April 7, 1860 – October 25, 1936) was a satirical poet from Iceland, who later lived in the U.S. State of North Dakota.

He was born near Akureyri, Iceland, and emigrated to North America in 1878. He originally lived in Winnipeg, Manitoba, and later moved to the United States where he lived in Duluth, Minnesota. Around 1894, he moved to North Dakota and took up residence in Thingvalla Township, which had several large Icelandic settlements. His poems were well known in Iceland and in the United States.

In 1999 President Ólafur Grímsson of Iceland visited Thingvalla Township to rededicate a monument to Julius at Thingvalla Lutheran Church, where Julius is buried. The monument was originally built in 1936 and was reconstructed in conjunction with the 100th Annual Deuce of August Celebration. The church was subsequently completely destroyed by a fire in 2003, but the Julius monument and the cemetery survived.

== Related Reading ==
- Neijmann, Daisy L. (2006) A History of Icelandic Literature. Volume 5 of History of Scandinavian literatures (American-Scandinavian Foundation, University of Nebraska Press) ISBN 9780803233461
