= Norval Baptie =

Canadian speed and figure skater

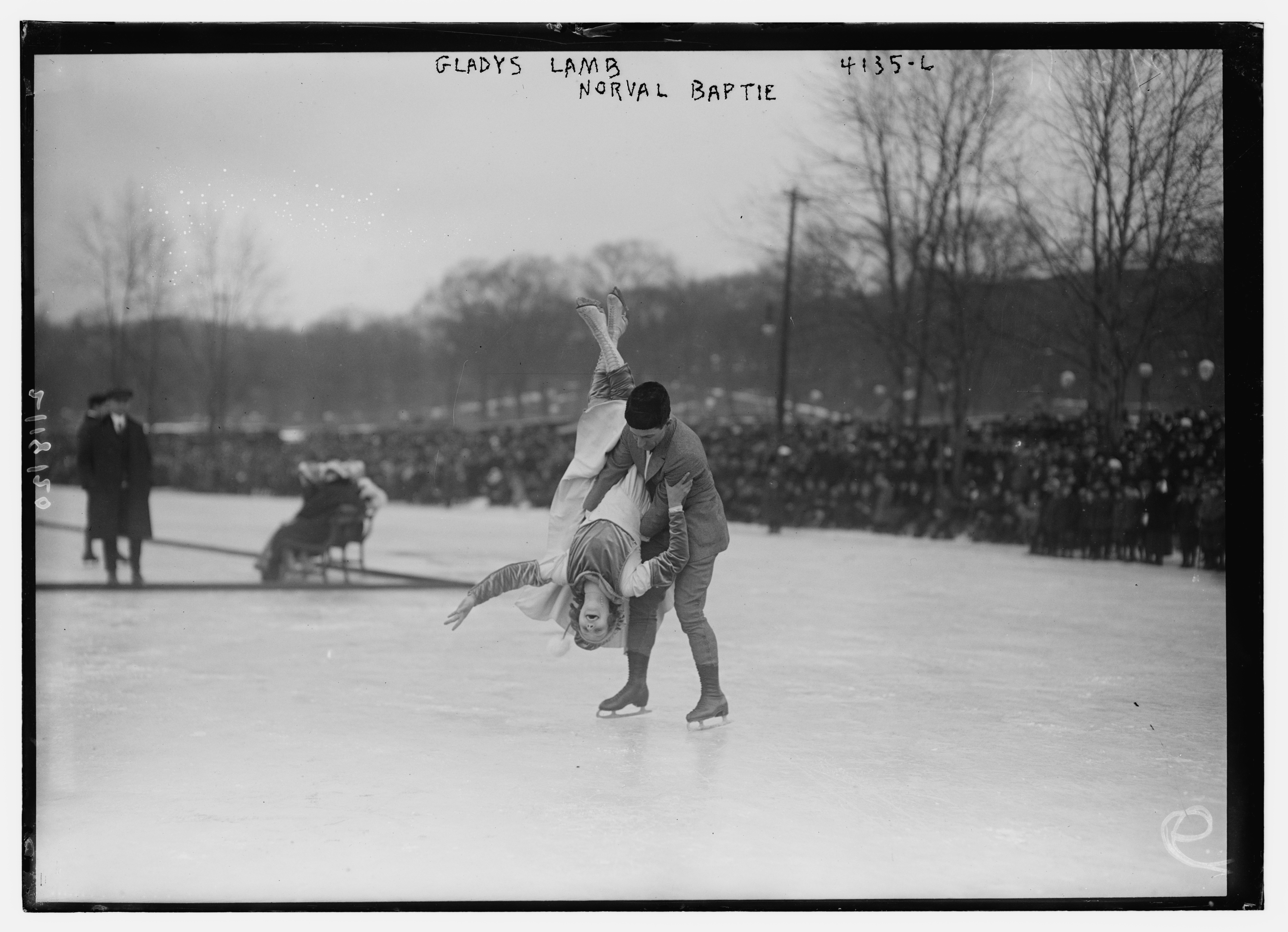
Gladys Lamb and Norval Baptie in 1917

Norval Baptie (March 18, 1879 – November 26, 1966) was a World record holding speed skater, a champion figure skater, and pioneering ice showman. He was inducted into the Canada's Sports Hall of Fame in 1963. and was one of the two charter members of the Ice Skating Institute Hall of Fame in the same year.

Born in Bethany, Ontario, he grew up in Bathgate, North Dakota, United States. By the age of 14 he was the North Dakota speed skating champion. In 1897, he challenged World champion Jack McCulloch to a race, and easily won. Over his career, he won almost 5000 races and lost one. He shattered every amateur and professional speed skating record.

After his speed skating career, Baptie moved into stunt and figure skating. He set new records for broad jump, skating backwards, jumping over barrels, and even skating on stilts. Baptie began doing solo exhibition shows, which eventually evolved into the World's first ice shows. In the 1930s, he directed shows that featured Sonja Henie, a champion figure skater.

Baptie was also influential in the design of skates. He helped design the tubular racing skate and eliminated the curled figure skating blade.

In 1938, Baptie retired from the ice. However, he became a professional coach and was listed as a member of the American Skaters Guild in 1940. He continued to coach even after losing both legs from complications from diabetes. He was the Grandfather of noted figure skating coach, Betty Berens, and Great-grandfather of Ice Follies Star Susan Berens.
