= Pembina County Courthouse =

- U.S. National Register of Historic Places
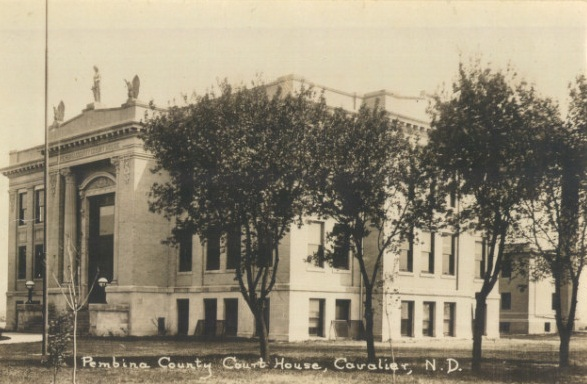
- Pembina County Courthouse, c. 1912-1920

- Location within North Dakota Location within the United States
- Location: 301 Dakota Street W, Cavalier, North Dakota
- Coordinates: 48°47′28″N 97°37′31″W
- Built: 1912
- Architect: Buechner & Orth
- Architectural style: Beaux Arts
- MPS: Buechner and Orth Courthouses in North Dakota TR
- NRHP reference No.: 80002923
- Added to NRHP: November 25, 1980

The Pembina County Courthouse in Cavalier, North Dakota was built in 1912. It was designed by architects Buechner & Orth in Beaux Arts style. It was listed on the National Register of Historic Places (NRHP) in 1980.

The courthouse is the only Buechner & Orth-designed courthouse in North Dakota to not have a central dome. The listing includes a second contributing building, a sheriff's residence and jail.
