= Akra Township, Pembina County, North Dakota =

Akra Township
- Township
- Location within the state of North Dakota
- Coordinates: 48°46′12″N 97°45′14″W
- Country: United States
- State: North Dakota
- County: Pembina

Area
  - Total: 35.9 sq mi (93.1 km^{2})
  - Land: 35.6 sq mi (92.1 km^{2})
  - Water: 0.39 sq mi (1.0 km^{2})
- Elevation: 991 ft (302 m)

Population (2000)
  - Total: 252
  - Density: 7.0/sq mi (2.7/km^{2})
- Time zone: UTC-6 (Central (CST))
  - Summer (DST): UTC-5 (CDT)
- ZIP code: 58220
- Area code: 701
- FIPS code: 38-00900
- GNIS feature ID: 1036730

Akra Township is a township in Pembina County, North Dakota, United States.

== History ==
Akra Township was organized in 1882, and was known as one of the "Icelandic Townships," due to its large population of Icelanders who had settled here. Akra takes its name from Akranes, Iceland, a town near Reykjavík. Akra Township was a "double township," spanning two full survey townships. In 1888, the northern part of the township was separated and organized separately as Avon Township (now Advance Township).

== Geography ==
Icelandic State Park and the adjacent Renwick Dam and Lake Renwick are located in Akra Township.
