= Mountain, North Dakota =

- City
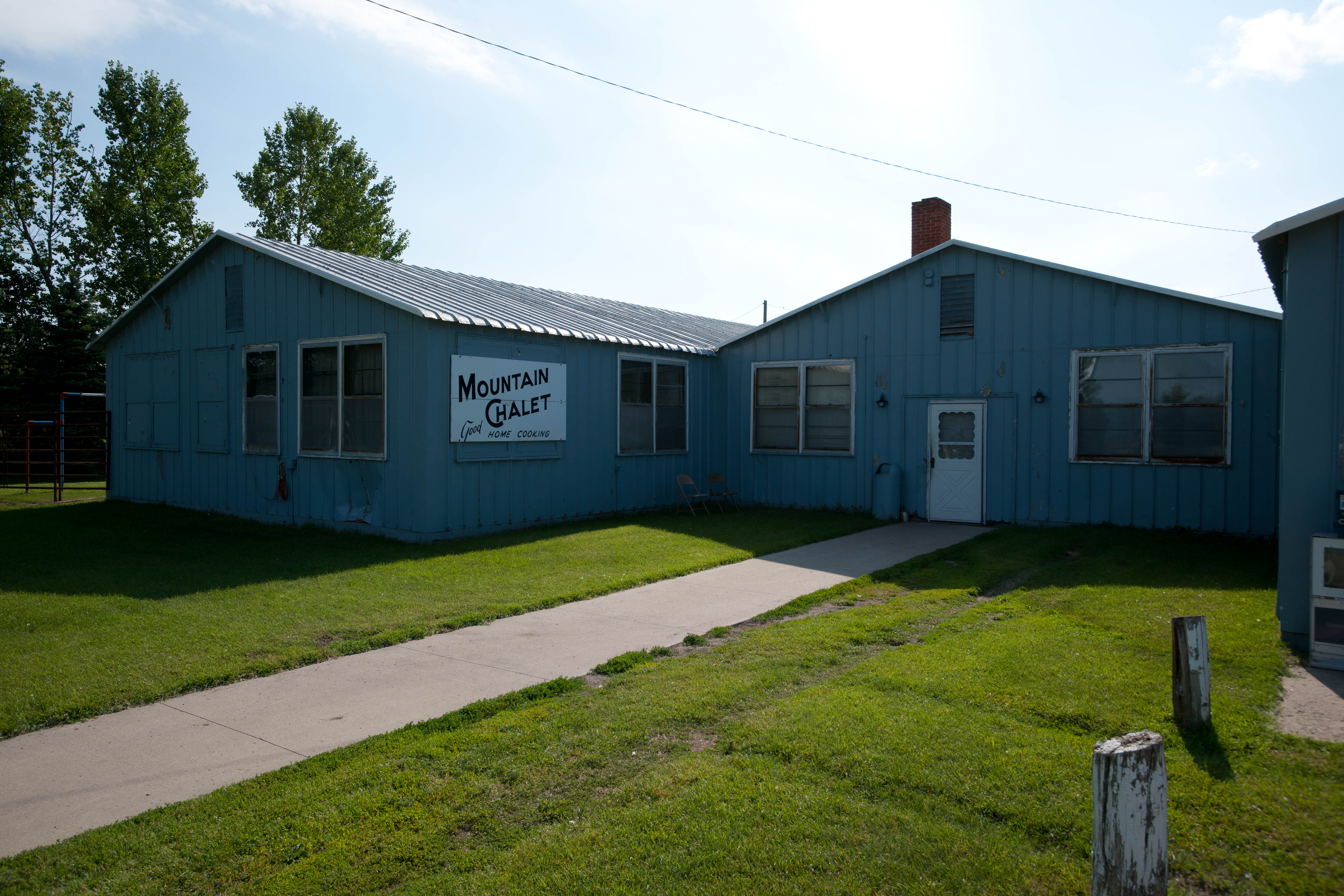
- Community Center, originally the school, in Mountain

- Location of Mountain, North Dakota
- Coordinates: 48°41′04″N 97°51′53″W
- Country: United States
- State: North Dakota
- County: Pembina
- Founded: 1884

Area
  - Total: 0.12 sq mi (0.32 km^{2})
  - Land: 0.12 sq mi (0.32 km^{2})
  - Water: 0 sq mi (0.00 km^{2})
- Elevation: 1,066 ft (325 m)

Population (2020)
  - Total: 80
  - Estimate (2022): 70
  - Density: 653.4/sq mi (252.26/km^{2})
- Time zone: UTC-6 (Central (CST))
  - Summer (DST): UTC-5 (CDT)
- ZIP code: 58262
- Area code: 701
- FIPS code: 38-54740
- GNIS feature ID: 1036172

Mountain is a city in Thingvalla Township, Pembina County, North Dakota, United States. The population was 80 at the 2020 census. Mountain was founded in 1884.

The community was the destination of many Icelandic immigrants who began arriving in 1879. Geir Haarde, a former prime minister of Iceland, attended the Annual 2 August Celebration in 2007. During his visit, city officials told Haarde about a goal to raise $1.3 million for a new community center. The government of Iceland has since donated $75,000 towards the center. The center was completed in 2016.

== History ==
In the spring of 1878, a small group of Icelanders came from Canada to explore Dakota Territory. Pastor Pall Thorlaksson is known as the Father of the Icelandic Settlement in Dakota which is centered around the city of Mountain, first known by the name, VIK, which means cove.

Mountain was officially laid out in 1884. The city was named on account of its lofty elevation. A post office called Mountain has been in operation since 1881. The Vikur Lutheran Church at Mountain was built in 1884.

== Geography ==
According to the United States Census Bureau, the city has a total area of 0.14 square miles (0.36 km^{2}), all land.

== Demographics ==
Historical population
Census	Pop.	Note	%±
1940	205		—
1950	219		6.8%
1960	218		−0.5%
1970	146		−33.0%
1980	156		6.8%
1990	134		−14.1%
2000	133		−0.7%
2010	92		−30.8%
2020	80		−13.0%
2022 (est.)	70		−12.5%
U.S. Decennial Census; 2020 Census

=== 2010 census ===
As of the census of 2010, there were 92 people, 30 households, and 14 families residing in the city. The population density was 657.1 inhabitants per square mile (253.7/km^{2}). There were 42 housing units at an average density of 300.0 per square mile (115.8/km^{2}). The racial makeup of the city was 97.8% White, 1.1% Native American, and 1.1% from other races. Hispanic or Latino of any race were 1.1% of the population.

There were 30 households, of which 13.3% had children under the age of 18 living with them, 30.0% were married couples living together, 10.0% had a female householder with no husband present, 6.7% had a male householder with no wife present, and 53.3% were non-families. 46.7% of all households were made up of individuals, and 13.3% had someone living alone who was 65 years of age or older. The average household size was 1.73 and the average family size was 2.43.

The median age in the city was 65.5 years. 6.5% of residents were under the age of 18; 3.4% were between the ages of 18 and 24; 13% were from 25 to 44; 26% were from 45 to 64; and 51.1% were 65 years of age or older. The gender makeup of the city was 44.6% male and 55.4% female.

=== 2000 census ===
As of the census of 2000, there were 133 people, 43 households, and 26 families residing in the city. The population density was 978.4 inhabitants per square mile (377.8/km^{2}). There were 55 housing units at an average density of 404.6 per square mile (156.2/km^{2}). The racial makeup of the city was 99.25% White and 0.75% Native American.

There were 43 households, out of which 25.6% had children under the age of 18 living with them, 44.2% were married couples living together, 16.3% had a female householder with no husband present, and 39.5% were non-families. 37.2% of all households were made up of individuals, and 27.9% had someone living alone who was 65 years of age or older. The average household size was 2.16 and the average family size was 2.81.

In the city, the population was spread out, with 16.5% under the age of 18, 5.3% from 18 to 24, 12.8% from 25 to 44, 18.0% from 45 to 64, and 47.4% who were 65 years of age or older. The median age was 64 years. For every 100 females, there were 87.3 males. For every 100 females age 18 and over, there were 76.2 males.

The median income for a household in the city was $23,750, and the median income for a family was $31,875. Males had a median income of $28,750 versus $25,625 for females. The per capita income for the city was $12,237. There were 17.9% of families and 19.8% of the population living below the poverty line, including 47.1% of under eighteens and 14.3% of those over 64.

== Notable person ==
- Einar Jonasson (1887-1935), politician in Manitoba, was born in the area but moved with his family to Canada in 1888.
