= Canton City, North Dakota =

- City
- Coordinates: 48°41′17″N 97°39′58″W
- Country: United States
- State: North Dakota
- County: Pembina
- Founded: 1882

Area
  - Total: 0.25 sq mi (0.65 km^{2})
  - Land: 0.25 sq mi (0.65 km^{2})
  - Water: 0 sq mi (0.00 km^{2})
- Elevation: 922 ft (281 m)

Population (2020)
  - Total: 31
  - Estimate (2022): 33
  - Density: 124.4/sq mi (48.04/km^{2})
- Time zone: UTC-6 (Central (CST))
  - Summer (DST): UTC-5 (CDT)
- ZIP code: 58241
- Area code: 701
- FIPS code: 38-12060
- GNIS feature ID: 1035953

Canton City, also known as Hensel, is a city located on the east edge of Park Township in Pembina County, North Dakota, United States. The population was 31 at the 2020 census.

== History ==
The city was founded as Canton Village in 1882. The post office was relocated from a location named Hensel a short distance away, and retained its name. The result is that Hensel Post Office is located in Canton City, and the town is most frequently referred to as Hensel and is marked as such on highway signs and maps. However the proper and legal name is Canton, whether as a city or a village. Although no documents have been found to locate the original Hensel Post Office, it is likely that it was just over two miles southwest of Canton City, on the land in the northeast quarter of Section 22 in Park Township that was homesteaded (granted 31 Dec 1890) by Joseph Erwin (or Irwin), whom records identify as the first postmaster, appointed 5 Feb 1884.

== Geography ==
According to the United States Census Bureau, the city has a total area of 0.14 square miles (0.36 km^{2}), all land.

== Demographics ==
Historical population
| Census | Pop. | Note | %± |
|---|---|---|---|
| 1900 | 98 | | — |
| 1910 | 115 | | 17.3% |
| 1920 | 101 | | −12.2% |
| 1930 | 125 | | 23.8% |
| 1940 | 148 | | 18.4% |
| 1950 | 139 | | −6.1% |
| 1960 | 130 | | −6.5% |
| 1970 | 81 | | −37.7% |
| 1980 | 68 | | −16.0% |
| 1990 | 64 | | −5.9% |
| 2000 | 42 | | −34.4% |
| 2010 | 45 | | 7.1% |
| 2020 | 31 | | −31.1% |
| 2022 (est.) | 33 | | 6.5% |
U.S. Decennial Census; 2020 Census

=== 2010 census ===
As of the census of 2010, there were 45 people, 26 households, and 12 families residing in the city. The population density was 321.4 inhabitants per square mile (124.1/km^{2}). There were 32 housing units at an average density of 228.6 per square mile (88.3/km^{2}). The racial makeup of the city was 97.8% White and 2.2% from two or more races.

There were 26 households, of which 15.4% had children under the age of 18 living with them, 34.6% were married couples living together, 7.7% had a female householder with no husband present, 3.8% had a male householder with no wife present, and 53.8% were non-families. 53.8% of all households were made up of individuals, and 11.5% had someone living alone who was 65 years of age or older. The average household size was 1.73 and the average family size was 2.50.

The median age in the city was 51.1 years. 13.3% of residents were under the age of 18; 8.8% were between the ages of 18 and 24; 20% were from 25 to 44; 42.2% were from 45 to 64; and 15.6% were 65 years of age or older. The gender makeup of the city was 60.0% male and 40.0% female.

=== 2000 census ===
As of the census of 2000, there were 42 people, 22 households, and 13 families residing in the city. The population density was 288.1 inhabitants per square mile (111.2/km^{2}). There were 29 housing units at an average density of 198.9 per square mile (76.8/km^{2}). The racial makeup of the city was 100.00% White.

There were 22 households, out of which 18.2% had children under the age of 18 living with them, 40.9% were married couples living together, 13.6% had a female householder with no husband present, and 36.4% were non-families. 31.8% of all households were made up of individuals, and 4.5% had someone living alone who was 65 years of age or older. The average household size was 1.91 and the average family size was 2.36.

In the city, the population was spread out, with 16.7% under the age of 18, 2.4% from 18 to 24, 38.1% from 25 to 44, 23.8% from 45 to 64, and 19.0% who were 65 years of age or older. The median age was 41 years. For every 100 females, there were 147.1 males. For every 100 females age 18 and over, there were 118.8 males.

The median income for a household in the city was $31,250, and the median income for a family was $36,875. Males had a median income of $28,750 versus $13,750 for females. The per capita income for the city was $21,511. None of the population and none of the families were below the poverty line.
