= Gardar, North Dakota =

Gardar
- Unincorporated community
- Location within North Dakota
- Coordinates: 48°35′21″N 97°52′26″W
- Country: United States
- State: North Dakota
- County: Pembina
- Elevation: 1,171 ft (357 m)

Population (2010)
  - Total: 90
  - Estimate (2016): 80
- Time zone: UTC−6 (Central (CST))
  - Summer (DST): UTC−5 (CDT)
- ZIP code: 58227
- Area code: 701
- FIPS code: 38-29100
- GNIS feature ID: 1029078

Gardar is an unincorporated community in Pembina County, in the U.S. state of North Dakota.

As of 2016, its population is 90.

== History ==
Gardar was founded ca. 1878, and was originally built up chiefly by Icelanders. A post office was established at Gardar in 1881, and remained in operation until 1984. The population was 90 in 1940.
