= Hamilton, North Dakota =

Hamilton
- City
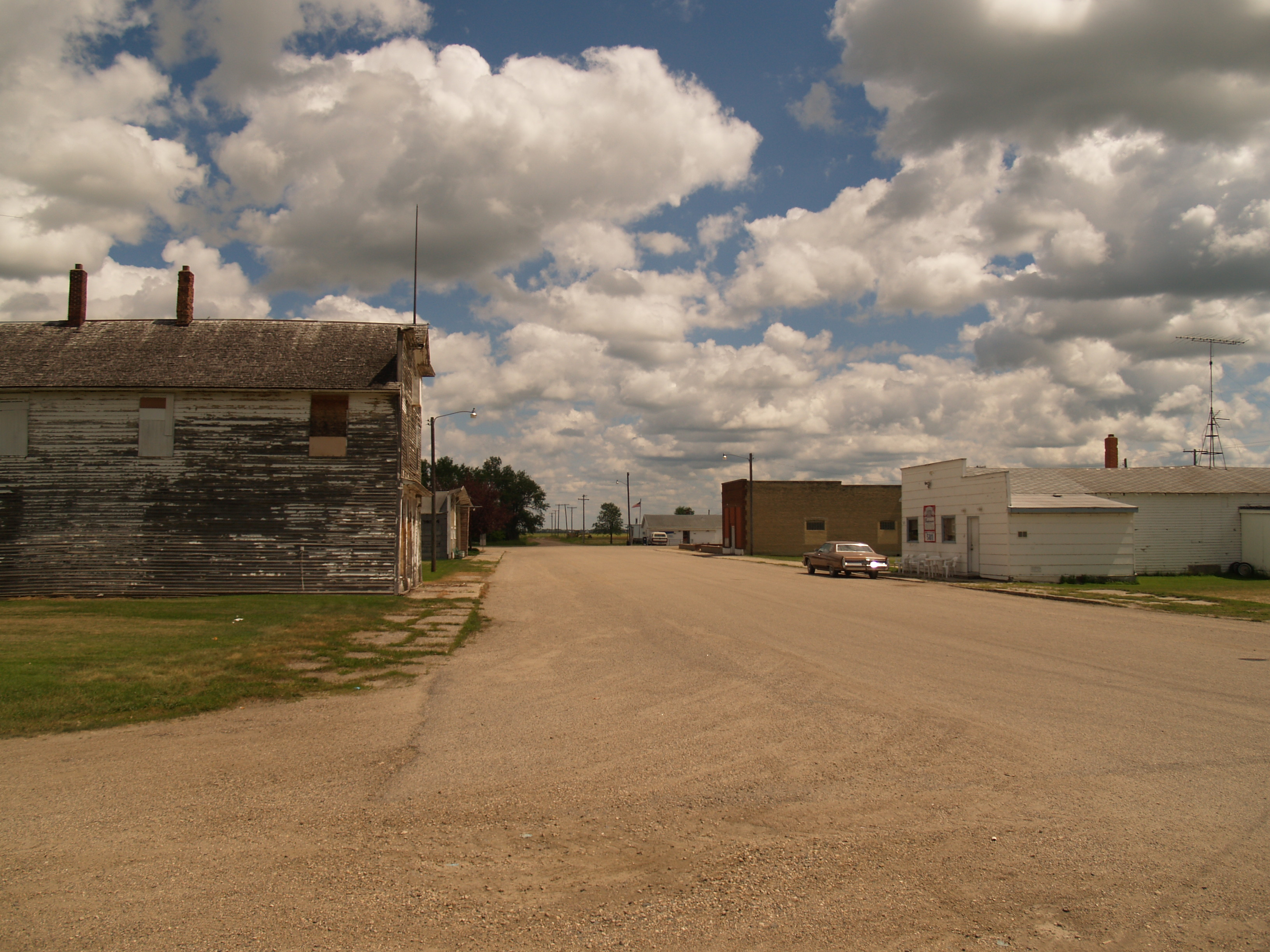
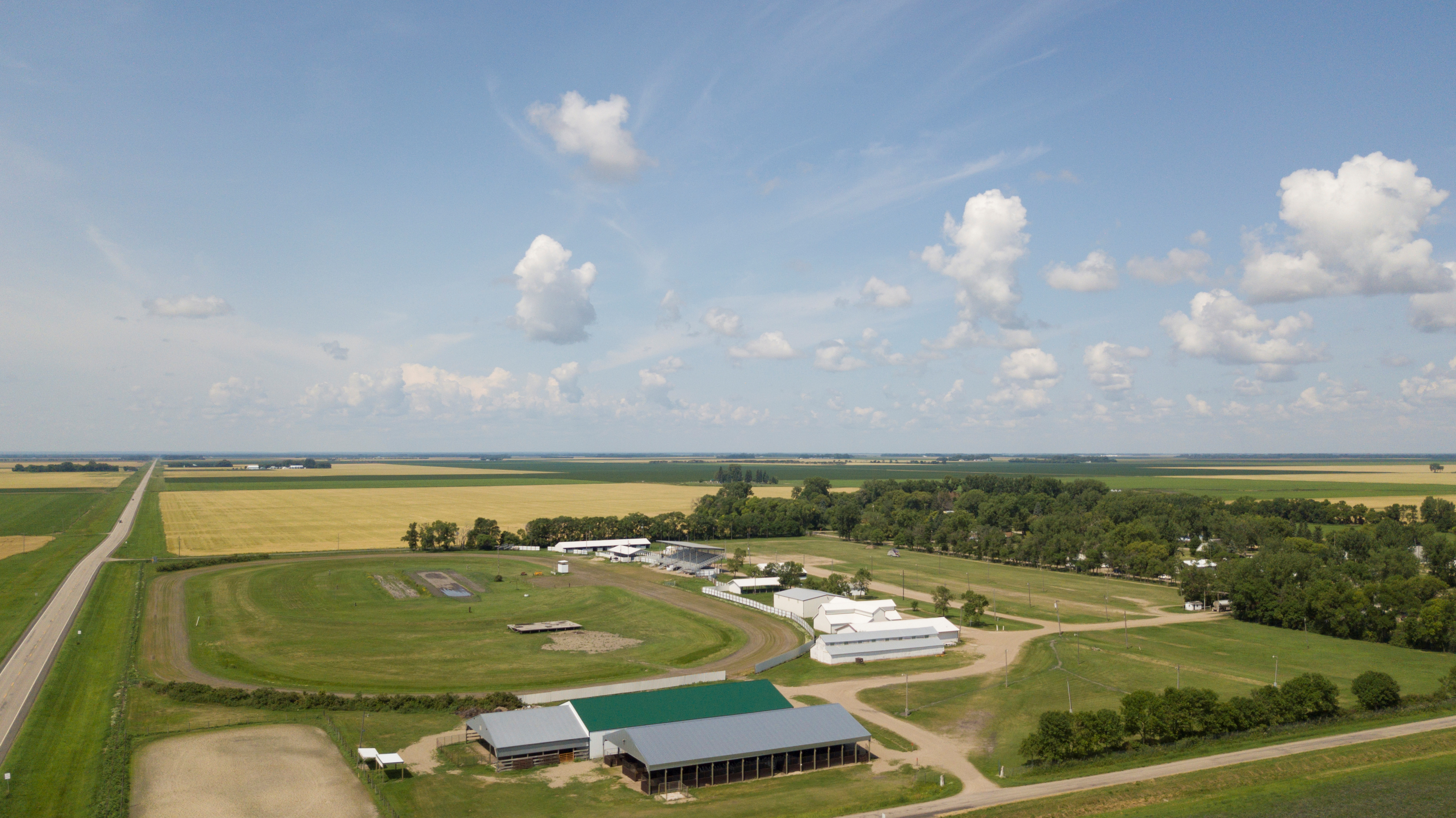
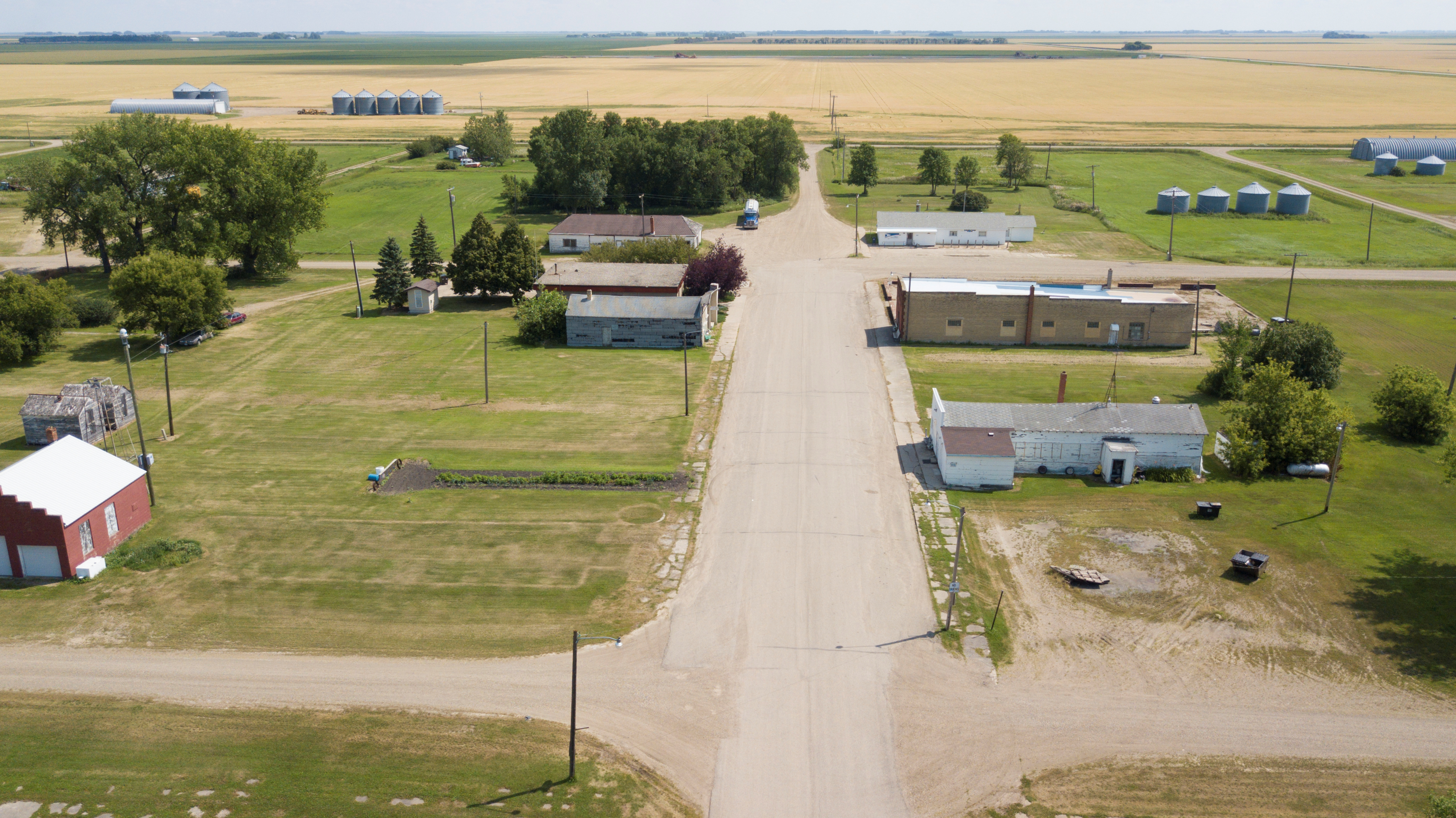
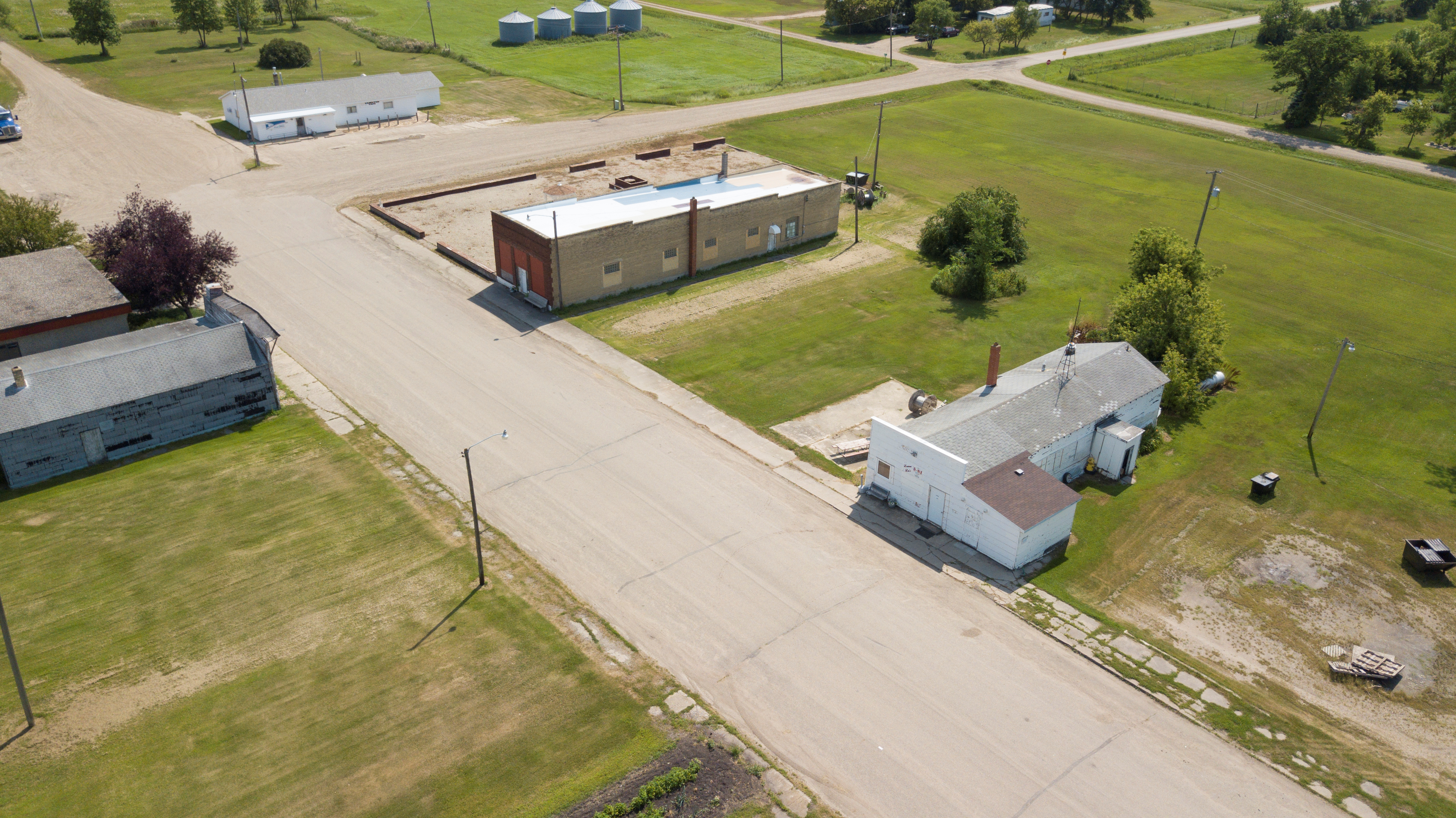
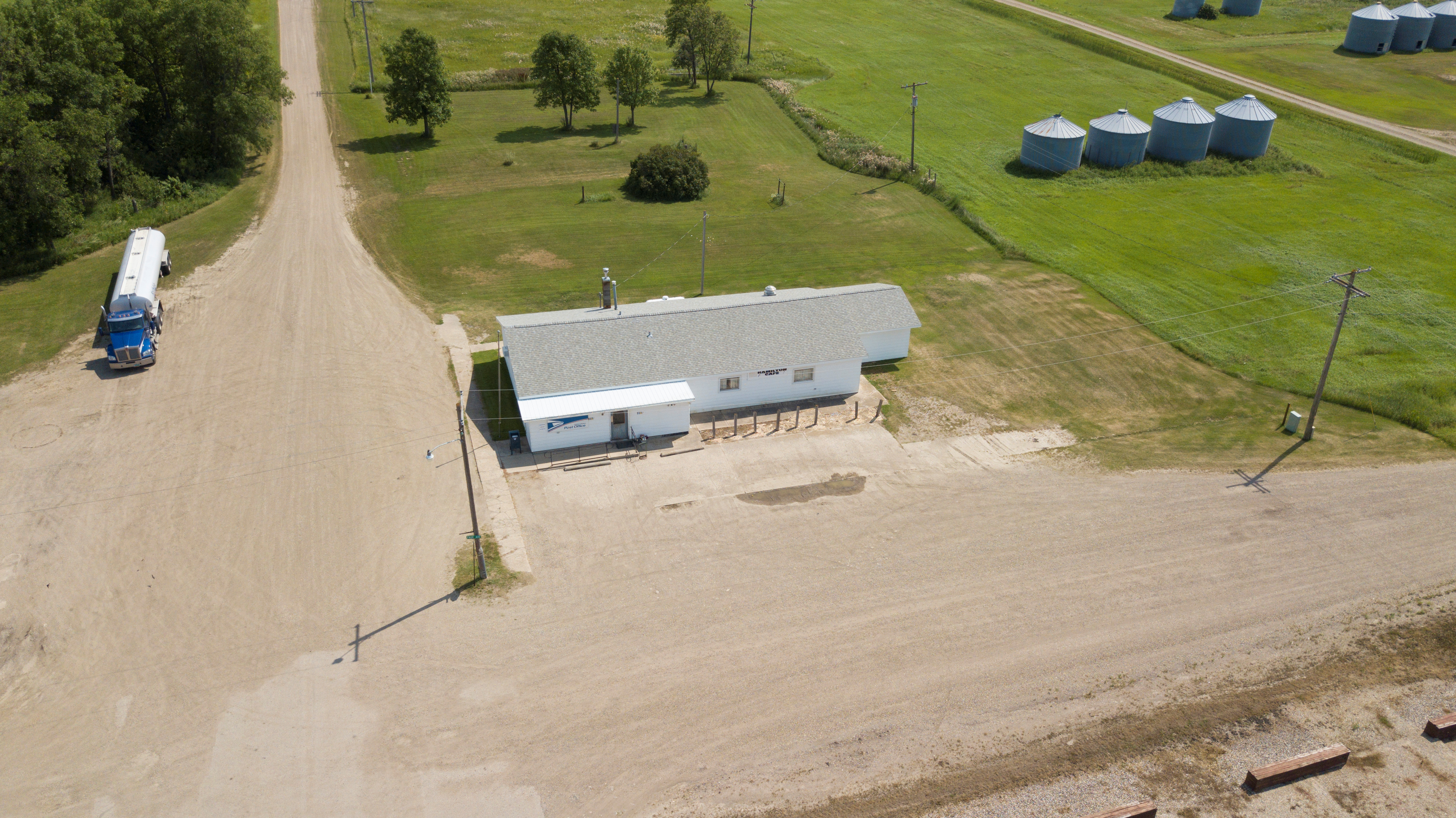
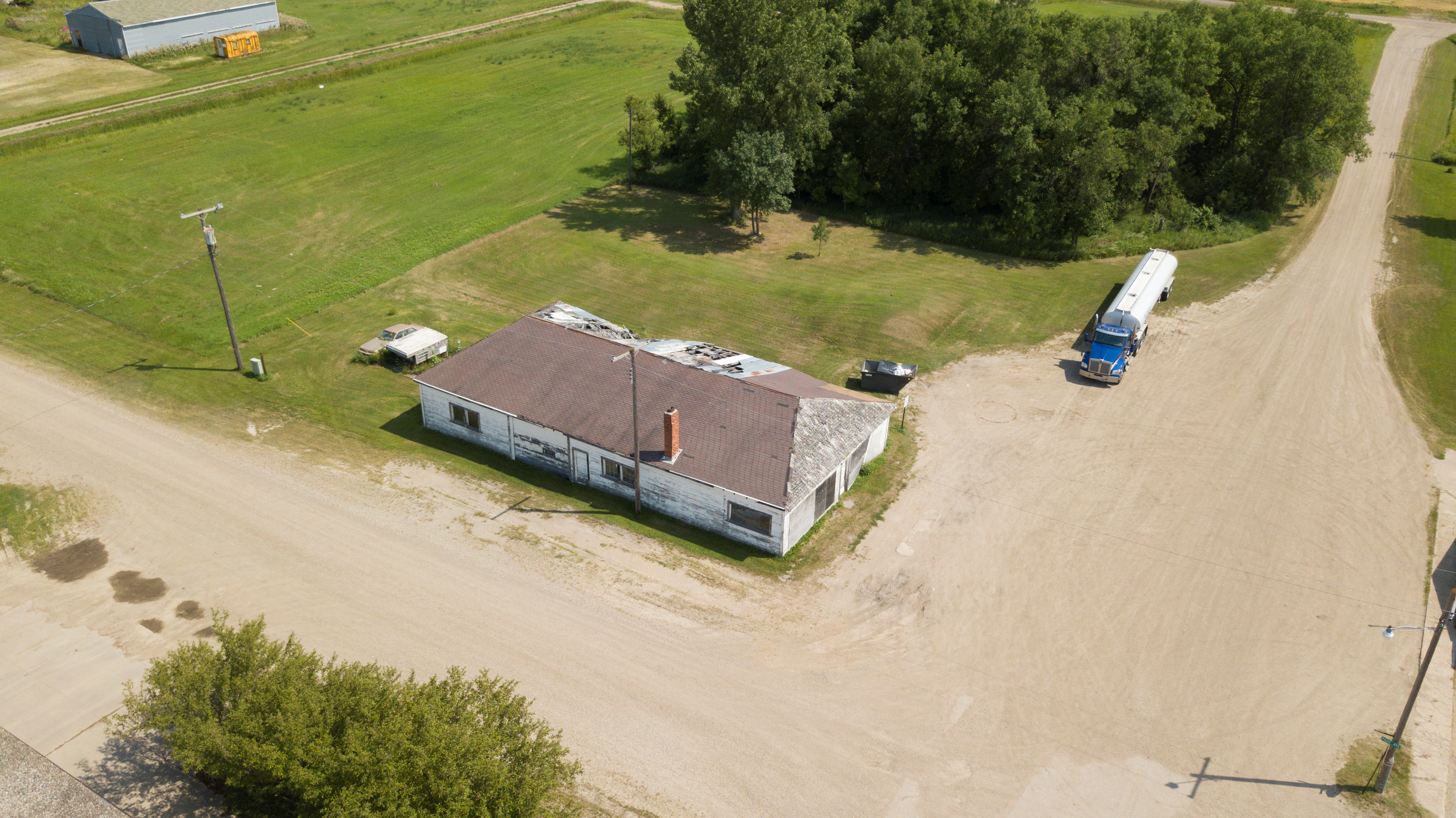
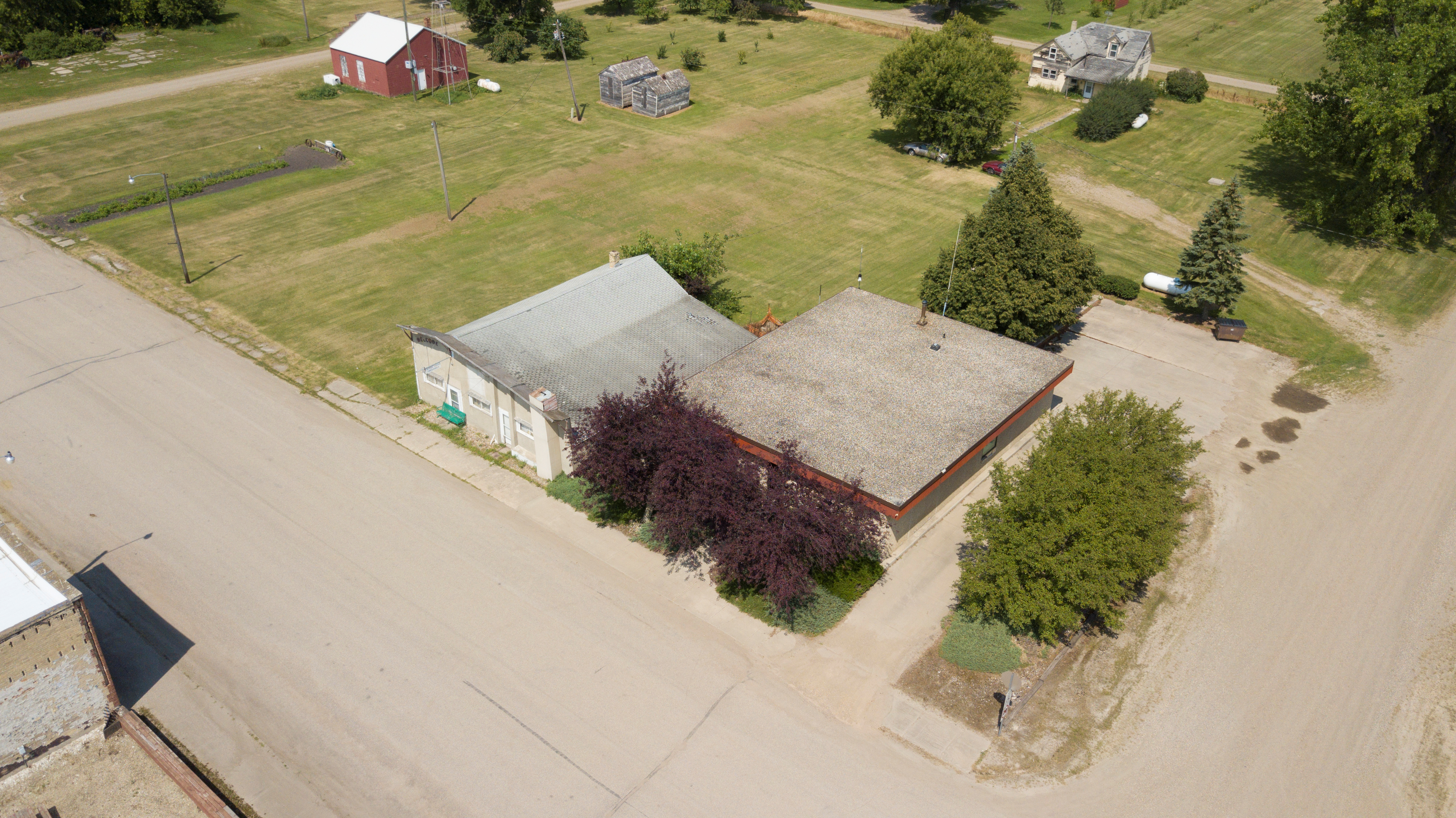
- Buildings in Hamilton Pembina County Fairgrounds Wall Street (Main Street) Wall Street (Main Street) US Post Office and Cafe Hamilton Motor and Implement building Bank of Hamilton, #1 Wall Street

- Location of Hamilton, North Dakota
- Coordinates: 48°48′29″N 97°27′06″W
- Country: United States
- State: North Dakota
- County: Pembina
- Founded: 1882

Area
  - Total: 0.29 sq mi (0.74 km^{2})
  - Land: 0.29 sq mi (0.74 km^{2})
  - Water: 0 sq mi (0.00 km^{2})
- Elevation: 823 ft (251 m)

Population (2020)
  - Total: 46
  - Estimate (2022): 44
  - Density: 161.6/sq mi (62.41/km^{2})
- Time zone: UTC–6 (Central (CST))
  - Summer (DST): UTC–5 (CDT)
- ZIP Code: 58238
- Area code: 701
- FIPS code: 38-34620
- GNIS feature ID: 1036075

Hamilton is a city in Pembina County, North Dakota, United States. The population was 46 at the 2020 census.

== History ==
Hamilton was platted in 1882, when the railroad was extended to that point. The city took its name from Hamilton, Ontario, the native land of a large share of the early settlers. A post office has been in operation at Hamilton since 1879. Hamilton is the home of the Pembina County Fair, the oldest continuously running county fair in North Dakota since 1894. Hamilton is also the home of The Bank of Hamilton, the oldest state bank in North Dakota, founded in 1886.

== Geography ==
According to the United States Census Bureau, the city has a total area of 0.27 square miles (0.70 km^{2}), all land.

== Demographics ==
Historical population
Census	Pop.	Note	%±
1890	257		—
1900	224		−12.8%
1910	213		−4.9%
1920	200		−6.1%
1930	151		−24.5%
1940	255		68.9%
1950	241		−5.5%
1960	217		−10.0%
1970	110		−49.3%
1980	109		−0.9%
1990	74		−32.1%
2000	73		−1.4%
2010	61		−16.4%
2020	46		−24.6%
2022 (est.)	44		−4.3%
U.S. Decennial Census; 2020 Census

=== 2010 census ===
As of the census of 2010, there were 61 people, 29 households, and 19 families residing in the city. The population density was 225.9 inhabitants per square mile (87.2/km^{2}). There were 37 housing units at an average density of 137.0 per square mile (52.9/km^{2}). The racial makeup of the city was 100.0% White.

There were 29 households, of which 20.7% had children under the age of 18 living with them, 55.2% were married couples living together, 6.9% had a female householder with no husband present, 3.4% had a male householder with no wife present, and 34.5% were non-families. 34.5% of all households were made up of individuals, and 10.3% had someone living alone who was 65 years of age or older. The average household size was 2.10 and the average family size was 2.37.

The median age in the city was 52.3 years. 14.8% of residents were under the age of 18; 8.1% were between the ages of 18 and 24; 16.3% were from 25 to 44; 29.5% were from 45 to 64; and 31.1% were 65 years of age or older. The gender makeup of the city was 47.5% male and 52.5% female.

=== 2000 census ===
As of the census of 2000, there were 72 people, 34 households, and 21 families residing in the city. The population density was 224.4 inhabitants per square mile (86.6/km^{2}). There were 40 housing units at an average density of 122.9 per square mile (47.5/km^{2}). The racial makeup of the city was 100.00% White.

There were 34 households, out of which 21% had children under the age of 18 living with them, 50% were married couples living together, 6% had a female householder with no husband present, and 38% were non-families. 38% of all households were made up of individuals, and 21% had someone living alone who was 65 years of age or older. The average household size was 2.15 and the average family size was 2.81.

In the city, the population was spread out, with 22% under the age of 18, 4% from 18 to 24, 21% from 25 to 44, 22% from 45 to 64, and 32% who were 65 years of age or older. The median age was 48 years. For every 100 females, there were 82.5 males. For every 100 females age 18 and over, there were 90.0 males.

The median income for a household in the city was $35,625, and the median income for a family was $41,250. Males had a median income of $46,875 versus $28,125 for females. The per capita income for the city was $28,501. None of the population and none of the families were below the poverty line.
