= Frost Fire Park =

Ski area in North Dakota, United States

- Location in the United States Location in North Dakota
- Location: Cavalier County, North Dakota, U.S.
- Nearest city: Walhalla: 7 miles (11 km) Grand Forks: 115 mi (185 km); Winnipeg, Manitoba: 105 mi (170 km)
- Coordinates: 48.912°N 98.068°W
- Vertical: 350 ft (107 m)
- Top elevation: 1,400 ft (427 m) AMSL
- Base elevation: 1,070 ft (326 m)
- Trails: 10: 4 - easiest; 3 - more difficult; 3 - most difficult
- Longest run: 0.5 mi (0.8 km)
- Lift system: 1 quad chairlift 1 magic carpet
- Terrain parks: 1, Dragon's Mouth
- Snowmaking: yes
- Night skiing: none

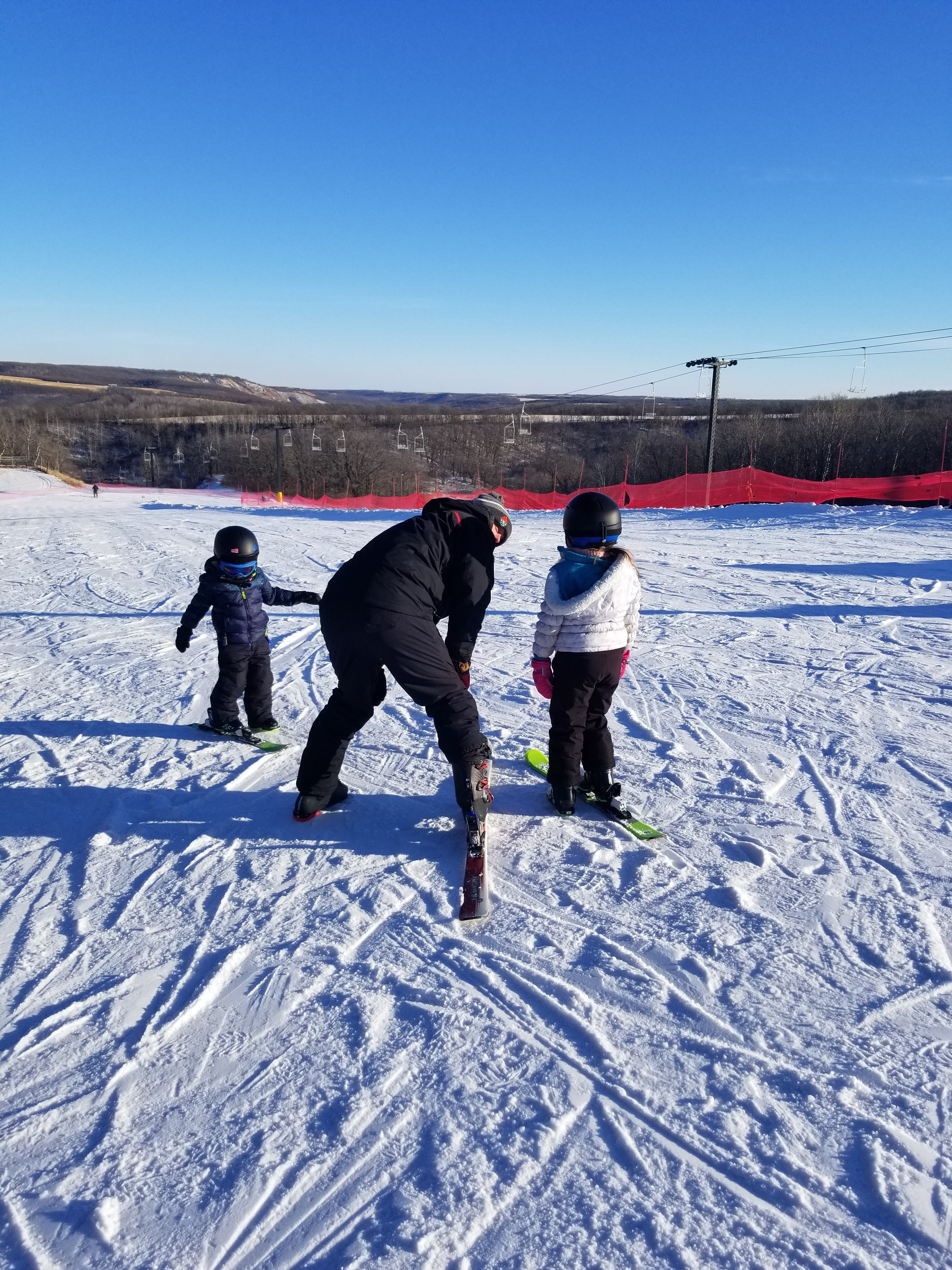
Ski lesson at Frost Fire Park

Frost Fire Park is a modest alpine ski area and chairlift access Mountain Bike Park in the midwestern United States, in the Pembina River Gorge of northeastern North Dakota. Located in eastern Cavalier County, it is seven miles (11 km) west of Walhalla and six miles (10 km) south of the international border with Canada (Manitoba).

Started in 1976, Frost Fire Park has one quad-seat chairlift and a magic carpet, with 7 runs, ski and snowboard rentals, certified ski and snowboard instructors, day lodge, and Howatt Hangar Bar and Grill. It does not offer tubing. It has an outdoor amphitheater, which hosts several plays and musicals during the summer. An "upside-down" area, the parking lot and lodge are near the top of the ski runs.

After 40 years, Frost Fire Ski and Snowboard Area was purchased by the Pembina Gorge Foundation. The Foundation changed the name to "Frost Fire Park" since it will no longer be a single season venue. Summer offers downhill mountain biking with 8 full downhill trails with varying degrees of difficulty, with chair lift service back to the top.

Frost Fire Park purchased a new quad-seat chair lift with 57 seats total, to replace the very old ski lift that has been out of order since 2015.
