= Our Whole Lives =

Series of sexuality curricula

The Our Whole Lives emblem

Our Whole Lives, or OWL, is a series of six comprehensive sexuality curricula for children, teenagers, young adults and adults published by the Unitarian Universalist Association and the United Church of Christ Justice and Witness Ministries. Publication was the result of seven years of collaborative effort by the two faiths to prepare material which addresses sexuality throughout the lifespan in age appropriate ways.

The Our Whole Lives program operates under the idea that well informed youth and young adults make better, healthier decisions about sexuality than those without complete information. OWL strives to be unbiased and teaches about heterosexual, bisexual, homosexual, and transgender sexual health. In addition to information on sex, OWL is intended to help children, youth, and adults to be emotionally healthy and responsible in terms of their sexuality.

== History ==
In Unitarian Universalist congregations the grades 7–9 OWL curriculum replaced the somewhat controversial About Your Sexuality (AYS), which was created in the 1970s and went out of print in the 1990s. The OWL curriculum was first implemented in 1999.

== Program structure ==
There are four OWL curricula designed for the American school grades of K–1, 4–6, 7–9, 10–12, plus one for young adults (18- to 35-year-olds), one for adults, and one for older adults. Each curriculum approaches topics differently based on the age of participants. The K-1 curriculum, for example, looks at bodily autonomy, family, trusted adults, and that a sperm, egg, and uterus are required to make a baby. The curriculum for older adults, on the other hand, might discuss aging, disability, dating as an older person, and body image.

Sessions are usually held weekly.

Each session of the Our Whole Lives curriculum can include the "Sexuality and Our Faith" companion, which comes in separate versions, one for the UUA and CUC communities and another one for the UCC community. Without "Sexuality and Our Faith," the programs have no religious material and are thus appropriate for use in schools and other non-religious institutions.

Facilitators for Our Whole Lives work in teams of at least two – one male and one female – for each class. The gender balance allows participants to feel comfortable raising concerns, questions and issues with their facilitators.

For the middle school (grades 7–9) curriculum, some activities are done in gender segregated groups; otherwise all activities take place in mixed gender groups.

== Program values ==
Our Whole Lives is built upon three core values:

1. Respect
2. Relationships
3. Responsibility

Participants are encouraged to use these values in decision-making concerning their own sexuality and relationships. Throughout the program, participants are encouraged to explore and learn to articulate their own values, such as self-worth, justice, and inclusivity.

The program values confidentiality, with a "Question Box" often being used to allow participants to ask questions anonymously.

== Program leaders ==
Our Whole Lives classes are led by teams of facilitators recruited from within their congregations. Before leading Our Whole Lives, facilitators must complete a training program led by certified trainers of trainers. In addition to exploring the core values and pedagogical theory underlying Our Whole Lives, trainings include opportunities to peer-facilitate a session. At the end of the training (which is approximately 20 hours of training over three days), facilitators must be certified by their trainers before leading Our Whole Lives in their congregations.

Leaders for Our Whole Lives are expected to model the program values – treating participants with respect and honoring their moral agency.
