= Welcoming Congregation =

A welcoming congregation can be:

- Any of several LGBTQ-affirming religious groups and their LGBTQ welcoming programs such as,
  - Unitarian Universalist (UU) communities that have gone through the UU Welcoming Congregation program
