= Fouracre =

Fouracre is a surname. Notable people with the surname include:

- Bob Fouracre (1937–2021), American sportscaster
- Lloyd Fouracre (born 1987), British murder victim
- Paul Fouracre, professor of medieval history at the University of Manchester
