= AYS =

AYS or Ays may refer to:

- About Your Sexuality, was a comprehensive sex education course from the Unitarian Universalist Association
- Ay dynasty, a ruling lineage in south India
- The National Rail code for Aylesbury railway station in Aylesbury, United Kingdom
- The Eyeish people, also known as Ays, a Native American tribe from Texas
- Waycross-Ware County Airport, IATA code AYS, airport in Georgia, United States
- Amaysim Australia Ltd, a company listed on the Australian Securities Exchange
