= Personal, social, health and economic education =

English school subject to prepare students for life and work

Personal, social, health and economic education (PSHE) is the school curriculum subject in England that teaches young people, through all key stages, knowledge and skills for life during and after education. PSHE education covers education on personal and health related matters — such as Relationship and Sex Education — as well as preparation for post-education life, such as economic sustainability and careers advice.

The PSHE education curriculum incorporates statutory relationships, sex and health education (RSHE) content that must be taught. This content is set by the Department for Education, and became compulsory in 2020. Reviews conducted by the Department for Education into PSHE education provision have found a range of positive outcomes, including improved attitudes to health, better abilities to deal with personal difficulties and improved behaviour, though criticism has been directed at its provisions of sex education, such as the treatment of gender identity in schools and a lack of attention in Ofsted inspections.

== PSHE themes and topics ==
The PSHE education programme of study is organised into three core themes:

1. health and well-being
2. relationships
3. living in the wider world (covering economic well-being and careers)

These themes include numerous topics linked to physical and mental health, alcohol and drug culture, sex, and relationships, education, economic well-being, and careers.

== History ==
The term PSHE was first introduced in the 2000 edition of the national curriculum, as a non-compulsory element that was encouraged to be taught in schools. Whilst this was the first official introduction of the subject to the national curriculum, it had already existed in an informal context since the 1960s. The first formal introduction of a PSHE component was Relationship and Sex Education, then known simply as sex education, as a non-statutory subject. A framework for PSHE was introduced in the 1990s, though its non-statutory status once again meant that it was not taught in some schools. In its earlier forms, the vagueness of the themes to be taught in PSHE was the subject of much criticism, with its "uncertain nature" making it difficult to teach.

Until 2020, PSHE education was a non-statutory (and therefore non-compulsory) curriculum subject. However, as Ofsted stated in its 2013 PSHE report, "the great majority of schools choose to teach it because it makes a major contribution to their statutory responsibilities to promote children and young people's personal and economic wellbeing; offer sex and relationships education; prepare pupils for adult life and provide a broad and balanced curriculum".

Not all content on the curriculum is statutory, and there have been concerns raised about the consistency of provision due to this non-statutory status. The aforementioned 2013 Ofsted PSHE report found that 40% of schools’ PSHE education was "not yet good enough". There has also been more of an expectation on independent schools to provide PSHE education than maintained schools and academies up to now due to greater emphasis on PSHE in the Independent Schools Standards.

Concerns over consistency and quality and provision prompted a national campaign to raise the status of PSHE education in all schools. This was supported by over 100 organisations (including the NSPCC, British Heart Foundation, Teenage Cancer Trust and Barnardo's), 85% of business leaders, 88% of teachers, 92% of parents and 92% of young people.

In 2017 the government committed to introducing compulsory relationships and sex education (RSE) in all secondary schools, and compulsory 'relationships education' in all primary schools. An additional commitment to the health education (mental and physical) aspect of PSHE education was announced in July 2018. The majority of PSHE education will therefore be compulsory in all schools from September 2020. Though not yet compulsory, schools are still expected to cover the economic wellbeing (and careers) components of PSHE education.

The PSHE Association and the Sex Education Forum jointly published a 'Roadmap to Statutory RSE education' in November 2018 to support schools in preparing their relationships and sex education for statutory changes. In February 2019, the Department of Education enacted a statutory guidance policy which will assist schools in England with PSHE when it becomes compulsory in 2020.

A measure to make PSHE compulsory in primary and secondary schools in England received approval from the House of Lords in April 2019. The Department for Education (DfE) published final statutory guidance for teaching Relationships Education, Relationships and Sex Education (RSE) and Health Education in June 2019. The consultation closed in November 2018. This guidance has replaced existing government "Sex and Relationship Education Guidance", which were last updated in 2000. The guidelines, which were also published by the House of Commons, require, among other things, acknowledgement of England's laws concerning gay rights, including the legalization of same-sex marriage and the protection of the "physical and mental wellbeing" of gay children.

== National body for PSHE education ==
The PSHE Association is the national body for PSHE education in England, providing advice and support to a network of over 50,000 teachers and other professionals working in schools nationwide. The Association is an independent charity and membership organisation, established as the official national PSHE subject association by the Department for Education in 2007.

== Devolved administrations ==
=== Scotland ===
PSHE is known as "health and wellbeing", is governed by guidance published by the Scottish Government and covers the following themes: mental, emotional, social and physical wellbeing, PE, food and health, substance misuse.

=== Wales ===
PSHE is known as "Personal and Social Education", is governed by guidance published by the Welsh Government and covers the following themes:

- Active citizenship
- Health and emotional well-being
- Moral and spiritual development
- Preparing for lifelong learning
- Sustainable development and global citizenship.

=== Northern Ireland ===
In Northern Ireland, the equivalent of PSHE in primary schools is "Personal Development and Mutual Understanding" (PDMU). It is governed by guidance published by CCEA and covers: Understanding and Health; Mutual Understanding in the Local and Wider Community.

In Northern Ireland, the equivalent of PSHE in Key Stage 3 is "Personal Development and Mutual Understanding" (PDMU). It is governed by guidance published by CCEA and covers: Education for Employability; Home Economics; Local and Global Citizenship; Personal Development. The equivalent of PSHE in secondary school is "Learning for Life and Work" (LLW). It is governed by guidance published by CCEA and is designed to help young people develop the fundamental skills, knowledge, qualities and dispositions that are prerequisites for life and work. There are differences in the subjects that make up LLW between key stage 3 and key stage 4.

== Crown Dependencies' administrations ==
=== Guernsey ===
In Guernsey, PSHE is known as "personal, social and health education" (PSHCE), is included in the "Healthy Schools" programme of the States of Guernsey, and has the aims of developing healthy behaviours, raising pupil achievement, reducing health inequalities and promoting social inclusion.

=== Jersey ===
In Jersey, PSHE is included in the health education provided by the States of Jersey, and has the aims of developing healthy behaviours, raising pupil achievement, reducing health inequalities and promoting social inclusion.

=== Isle of Man ===
On the Isle of Man, PSHE has the aims of developing healthy behaviours, raising pupil achievement, reducing health inequalities and promoting social inclusion.

== See also ==
- Stand Against Violence
- Relationship and Sex Education
