= Unitarian Universalism and LGBTQ people =

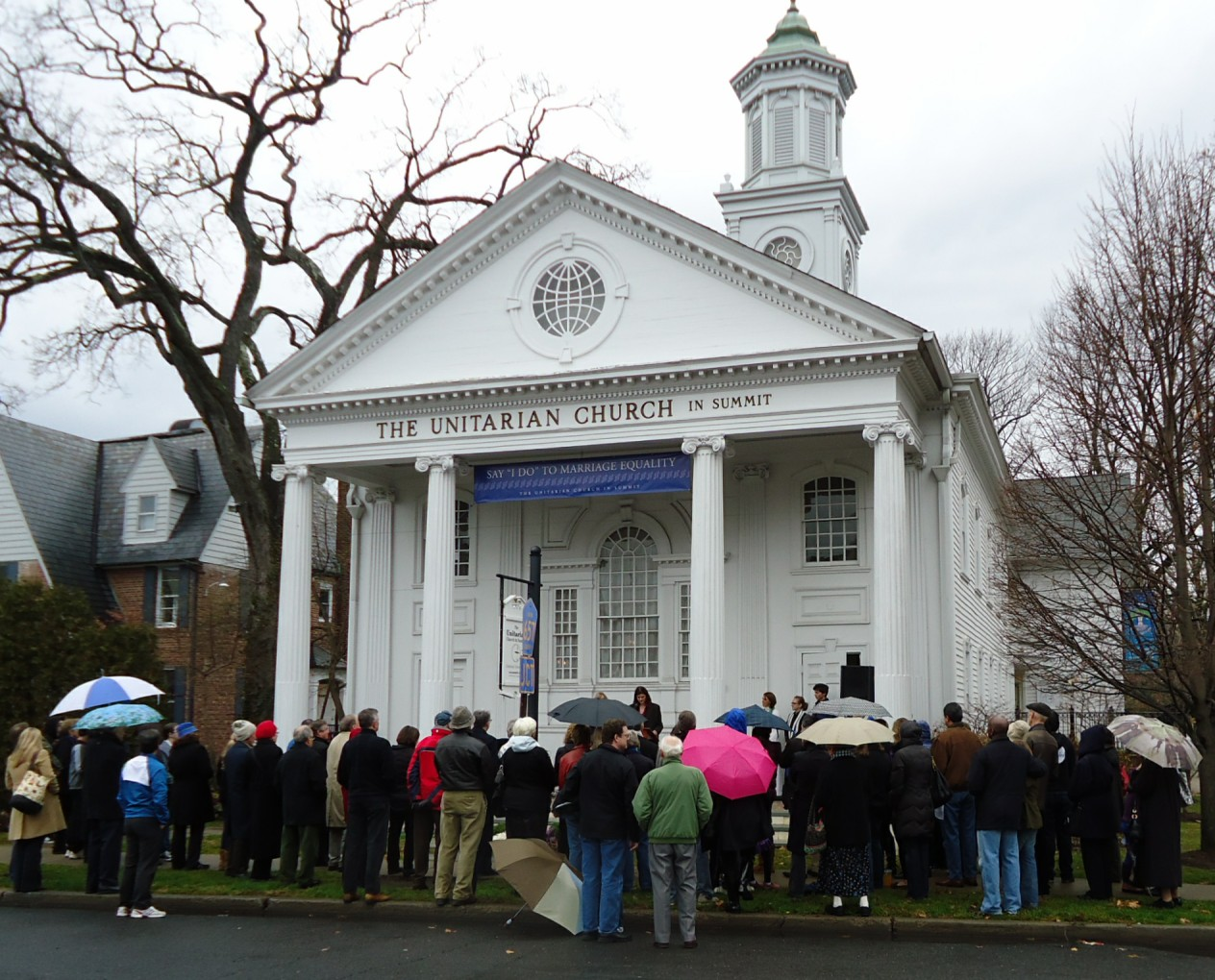
A rally at the Unitarian Church in Summit in New Jersey advocating marriage equality for same-sex couples in the state. The blue banner reads "Say 'I Do' to Marriage Equality".

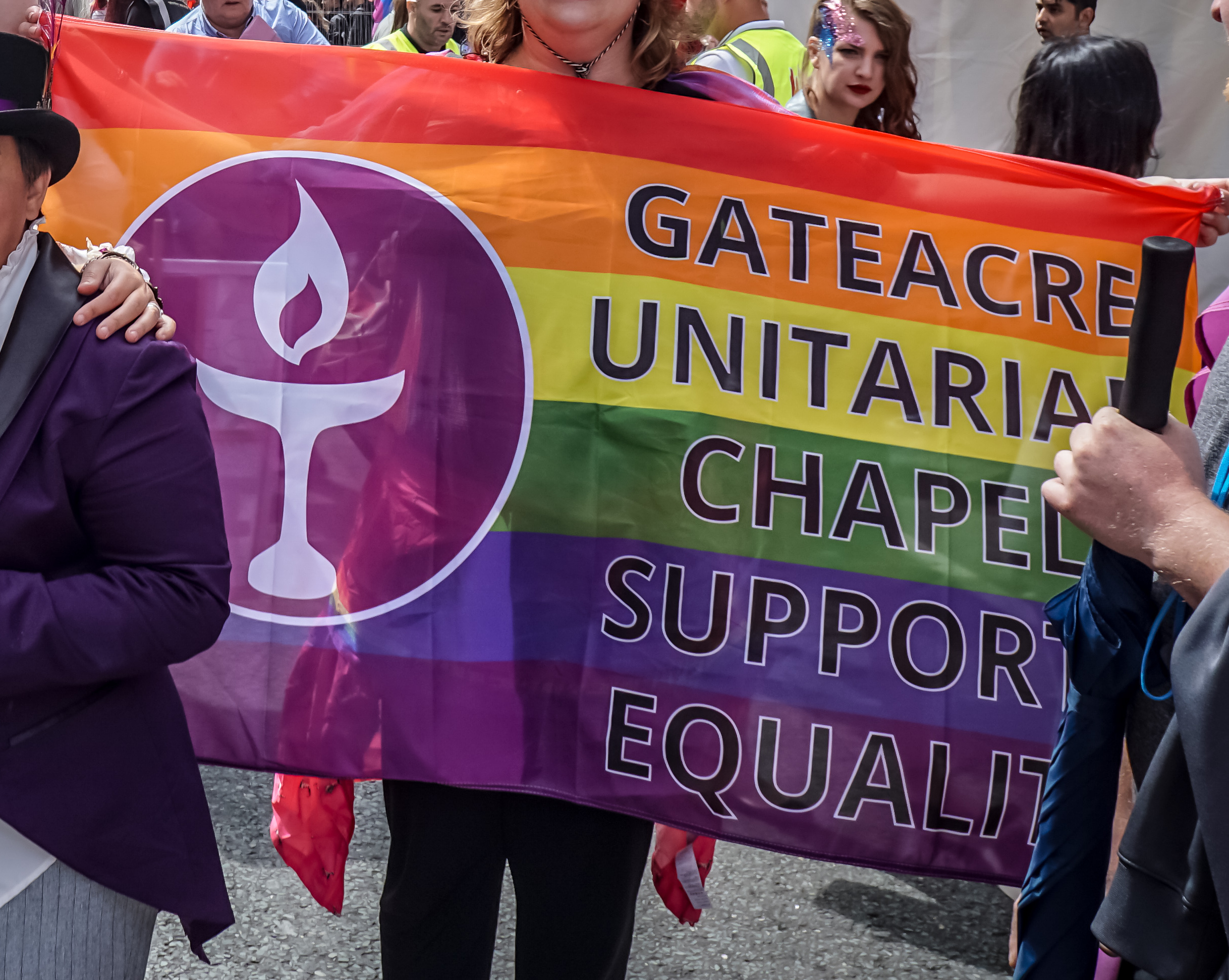
A rainbow flag at Liverpool Pride 2018 (England), advertising a local Unitarian chapel's support for equality

Unitarian Universalism, as practiced by the Unitarian Universalist Association (UUA), and the Canadian Unitarian Council (CUC), is a non-creedal and liberal theological tradition and an LGBTQ-affirming denomination.

The full participation of laypeople and the ordination of lesbian, gay, bisexual, transgender, and queer (LGBTQ) people who are open about their sexuality or gender identity; are sexually active if lesbian, gay, or bisexual; or are in same-sex relationships are permitted and welcomed by Unitarian Universalist organizations.

== Theology ==
The first of Unitarian Universalism's seven principles is the belief in "the inherent worth and dignity of every person", which is frequently cited as the faith's justification for their views of LGBTQ individuals.

== History ==
Unitarianism and Universalism, two religious movements that merged in 1961 to form Unitarian Universalism, had a long history of reform of social institutions and were a home for many abolitionists, feminists, and other forward thinkers, including gay liberationists.

The annual general assembly of the Unitarian Universalist Association has passed more than thirty resolutions on LGBTQ issues, including same-sex marriage, LGB people in the military, the Employment Nondiscrimination Act, and transgender rights.

In 1970, Unitarian Universalism was the first religion to officially condemn discrimination against homosexuals. The resolution condemned biphobia as well as homophobia.

In 1989, the UUA began a Welcoming Congregation Program to support churches in intentionally becoming more inclusive of LGBTQ people. After meeting requirements related to church policy, education, advocacy, and more, congregations are designated as Welcoming Congregations. As of 2025, more than 80% of all U.S. Unitarian Universalist congregations and 99% of all Canadian Unitarian Universalist congregations had gone through the process of becoming Welcoming Congregations.

In 2009, the UUA began a public advocacy campaign called Side With Love (originally Standing on the Side of Love) that “confronts issues of exclusion, oppression, and violence based on identity,” including LGBTQ issues. The campaign was started in reaction to a shooting at a Unitarian Universalist church in Knoxville, TN, which was targeted because it welcomed LGBTQ people.

In June 2023, Rev. Dr. Sofía Betancourt, a queer Afro-Latine cis woman, was elected as the UUA’s first out queer president.

=== Ordination and settlement of LGBTQ clergy ===
In September 1969, Rev. James L. Stoll publicly came out as gay, making him one of the first ordained ministers in North America to do so. The denomination ordained its first openly gay minister in 1979, and its first openly transgender minister was ordained in 1988.

In 1980 the Unitarian Universalist Association passed a resolution to assist in the settlement of openly gay, lesbian, and bisexual ministers, and in 1989 it started a program to help churches avoid discrimination when calling a new minister.

=== Education ===
In 1971, the Unitarian Universalist Association published About Your Sexuality, a sex education program for teenagers in Unitarian Universalist churches that treated homosexuality as a valid and normal form of sexuality. The program was revised several times over the next several decades and in 1999 was replaced with Our Whole Lives, a joint program with the United Church of Christ that continues to affirm LGBTQ identities in its curricula.

=== Same-sex marriage ===
The first documented same-sex weddings conducted by Unitarian Universalist ministers were performed by Rev. Ernest Pipes Jr., at the Community Church of Santa Monica, California, in 1957, and Rev. Harry Barron Scholefield, at the First Unitarian Church of San Francisco, in 1958.

The first same-sex marriage performed by a church in Canada (after the 1972 civil same-sex marriage of Michel Girouard and Rejean Tremblay of Montreal) was that of Chris Vogel and Richard North, married by the First Unitarian Universalist Church of Winnipeg on February 11, 1974, officiated by Unitarian minister Rev. Norm Naylor. Unitarian Universalists also performed the first same-sex marriages in Manitoba, Ontario, Alberta, British Columbia, Nova Scotia, and Saskatchewan, although the provincial governments often refused to recognize the marriages at the time.

The Unitarian Universalist Association has officially supported Unitarian Universalist clergy performing services of union for same-sex couples since 1984. Seven of the fourteen plaintiffs in Goodridge v. Department of Public Health, the case that legalized same-sex marriage in Massachusetts, were Unitarian Universalists. The denomination was very active in the fight for marriage equality in the United States through its advocacy campaign Side With Love. The UUA joined an amicus curiae brief in support of same-sex marriage for Obergefell v. Hodges, the Supreme Court case that legalized same-sex marriage in the United States.

=== Transgender rights ===
The Unitarian Universalist Association passed resolutions in support of transgender rights in 2007, 2016, 2021, and 2024. The 2024 resolution named that “full affirmation and celebration of transgender, nonbinary, intersex, and gender diverse people” is “a fundamental obligation revealed by [Unitarian Universalist] principles and values.”

In 2022 the UUA submitted an amicus brief in Eknes-Tucker v. Governor of the State of Alabama in support of the plaintiffs seeking to overturn Alabama's SB 184 bill, which criminalized gender-affirming healthcare for transgender youth.

In 2023 Unitarian Universalists began assisting transgender people in the United States who are relocating due to the passage of anti-transgender laws through the Pink Haven Coalition, a joint project between trans organizers, Unitarian Universalist organizations, other progressive faith groups, and mutual aid networks.

== Instituted organizations ==
=== Unitarian Universalist Association ===
The UUA has dedicated staff to becoming more welcoming and inclusive of LGBTQ people since 1973 through an office now called LGBTQ Ministries, making it the first major National Religious organization to establish an office in support of civil rights and social acceptance of LGBTQ people. The office of LGBTQ Ministries administers the Welcoming Congregation Program through which UU churches take action to increase their inclusion of LGBTQ people.

=== Canadian Unitarian Council ===
The Canadian Unitarian Council similarly supports the Welcoming Congregation Program and recognizes Welcoming Congregations.

=== International Council of Unitarians and Universalists ===
The defunct International Council of Unitarians and Universalists helped advocate for LGBTQ rights in Nigeria and Kenya.

=== Interweave ===
From 1993 until 2016, there was a fellowship of LGBTQ Unitarian Universalists and supporters called Interweave Continental, with a mission to work to end oppression based on sexual orientation and gender identity. Interweave was a related organization of the UUA. Sometimes, an individual church's Welcoming Congregation Committee evolved into an Interweave Chapter.

=== TRUUsT ===
Founded in 2004, TRUUsT (Transgender Religious Professional Unitarian Universalists Together) is an organization of trans Unitarian Universalist ministers, religious educators, seminarians, and other leaders.
