= Stephanie Mitelman =

Sex education professor

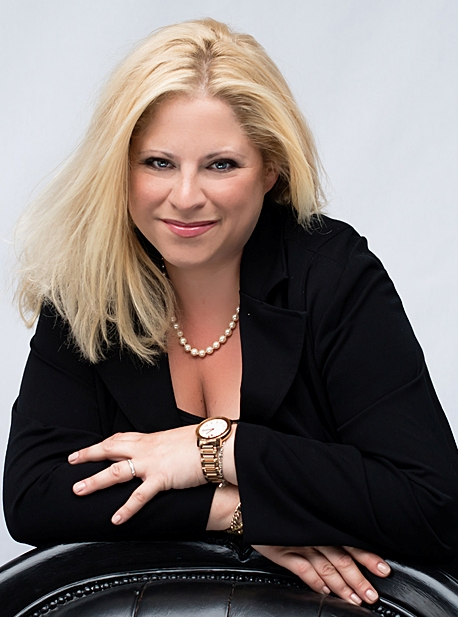
- Occupation: Public speaker, sex educator, entrepreneur, autism advocate
- Genre: Sex education and autism, childhood autism

Website
- sexedmart.com

Stephanie Mitelman Bercovitch (born February 25, 1976) is a Canadian sex education and family life education professor, public speaker, entrepreneur, sex educator, and author specializing in special education, particularly for youth with autism spectrum disorders. She is the owner and creator of Senseez Pillows, a company making vibrating pillows for people with sensory needs, and Sex Ed Mart, a sex education publishing and distribution company specializing in sex education for youth with special needs. Bercovitch also runs a private sex education practice for youth on the autism spectrum, their parents, and couples who are neurologically diverse.

Bercovitch is currently the only sex educator in Montreal certified by the American Association of Sexuality Educators, Counselors and Therapists.

Previously, she was a part-time professor of human sexuality at McGill University in the Department of Educational Counselling and Psychology, and is currently a part of the Part Time Faculty at Concordia University in the Department of Applied Human Sciences.

== Education career ==
Mitelman taught a graduate course at McGill University in the department of Educational Counselling and Psychology for 17 years.

Currently, Mitelman is a part of the Part Time Faculty at Concordia University, where she has been teaching in the Applied Human Sciences department for 18 years.

Mitelman was nominated for a Teaching Award in Excellence, as well as the 2013 First Tracks Award for Innovation in Sexology for her work in making sex ed accessible for people on the autism spectrum.

== Sex education ==
Bercovitch founded Sexpressions in 2000, which became Sex Ed Mart in 2017. The company provides sex education for students, and training for teachers and nurses across Canada. She also sells tools and activities to teach about sexual health, including her own publications, through the online Sex Ed Mart marketplace. Through Sexpressions, she wrote and published a full line of teaching tools, including a sexual health trivia game and anatomy posters.

Bercovitch was editor-in-chief of Changes, Changes, Changes: Great Methods for Puberty Education, working with William J. Taverner and associate editors. The book was released in 2014 by the Center for Sex Education in the United States and Sexpressions in Canada. She continues Sexpressions as a private sexuality education services for individuals, couples and families with special needs.

In 2004, Bercovitch and a group she organized re-launched the Sexual Health Network of Quebec (SHNQ) to replace Planned Parenthood Montreal, which had dissolved in 1998. By 2006, SHNQ was affiliated with the Canadian Federation for Sexual Health and, through them, the International Planned Parenthood Federation. They now offer sex education sessions for free to schools across Montreal, and advocate for the re-introduction of mandatory sex education in Quebec.

Bercovitch regularly speaks and trains on sex education for people on the autism spectrum. She has given workshops for parents and teachers at conferences and organizations in the United States and Canada, including Montreal's Gold Center and the Southeastern Washington Autism Conference.

== Senseez Pillows ==
Bercovitch founded Senseez Pillows in 2012, after making the first vibrating pillow in her basement to help her son with his special needs. The company quickly grew, creating pillows for children with sensory needs, particularly those with autism, ADHD, and sensory processing disorder. In 2013, Bercovitch appeared on CBC's Dragon's Den web episodes, successfully pitching her pillows to investors. Working with Lekotek in 2014, Bercovitch helped demonstrate the clinical benefits of the pillows and their vibration as a therapeutic and occupational therapy tool for youth on the autism spectrum. The study found that Senseez helped in daily life for 72% of the participating children.

Bercovitch received 2015 Gold Stevie Award for Female Entrepreneur of the Year for her success with Senseez Pillows. She and Senseez Pillows were featured on the cover of Montreal Families Magazine in March 2016.

Bercovitch sold the company in 2019.
