= Canadian Unitarians for Social Justice =

Canadian Unitarian Universalist organization

- The official CUSJ logo, featuring a flaming chalice and the CUSJ initialism
- Abbreviation: CUSJ
- Formation: 1996
- Type: social justice religious organization
- Purpose: To develop and maintain a vibrant network of Unitarian social action in Canada and elsewhere and to proactively represent Unitarian principles and values in matters of social justice.
- Headquarters: Moves about the country. Currently, Ottawa
- Location: Canada
- Official language: Mostly English
- President: Margaret Rao
- Key people: volunteer board
- Affiliations: Canadian Unitarian Council
- Website: cusj.org

Canadian Unitarians for Social Justice (CUSJ), established in 1996, is a Canadian Unitarian Universalist social justice organization that is an associate member of the Canadian Unitarian Council. The organization publishes quarterly issues of JUSTnews and quarterly discussion papers each year.
