= Vancouver Unitarians =

- Location in Metro Vancouver
- 49.2267517°N 123.1298893°W
- Location: Vancouver, British Columbia
- Country: Canada
- Denomination: Canadian Unitarian Council

Architecture
- Architect: Wolfgang Gerson

Vancouver Unitarians is the largest and oldest Unitarian congregation in British Columbia, Canada, established in 1909. The congregation meets every Sunday morning in the building at 949 West 49th Avenue (at Oak) in Vancouver. It has many active groups and committees and also offers space to various organizations.

== Beliefs ==
Like most North American Unitarian congregations, the belief system is pluralistic and can be described as spiritual but not religious in the sense of required adherence to a particular creed. Rev. Phillip Hewett was quoted in the Vancouver Courier saying, “The Unitarian movement has been set up to be based on personal spirituality, your own development, rather than adherence to a particular creed”.

== Advocacy and social responsibility ==
The congregation has active teams that work on social justice issues, including the environment, gender equality, racial justice and resettlement of refugees. In 2012, the congregation divested Enbridge stock and encouraged members to do the same. In 2023, they voted to divest all fossil fuel stocks.

== Architecture ==
The campus was designed by member and architect, Wolfgang Gerson, and has won architectural awards. It was constructed in the 1960s.

UCV’s award-winning 1964 buildings, the sanctuary, Hewett Centre, and the office building, are noted for their "simplicity and serenity". In 1998, they were voted among the "most beautiful" in Vancouver by a panel of architectural experts.

The Fireside Room is noted for being an early meeting place of the Don't Make a Wave Committee, which later evolved into Greenpeace. It received a Places That Matter designation and plaque noting this history.

The site has two labyrinths on the property. One is a classical three-circuit square and the other a double-processional labyrinth in the garden on the west side.

== Leadership ==
As of August 2023, the current minister is Rev. Shawn Gauthier.

Rev. Dr. Steven Epperson served as minister from 2001 to 2020. Rev. Phillip Hewett was parish minister for 35 years from 1956 to 1991. He was appointed minister emeritus. He died on February 24, 2018, at the age of 93.
