= Canadian Unitarian Council =

Liberal religious association of Unitarian Universalist congregations in Canada

Canadian Unitarian Council Conseil unitarien du Canada
- The official logo of the CUC, based upon the flaming chalice motif and featuring a maple leaf
- Abbreviation: CUC
- Classification: Unitarian Universalism
- Polity: Congregational
- Executive Director: Michael Jodah
- Region: Canada
- Headquarters: 302-192 Spadina Avenue Toronto, Ontario, Canada
- Origin: May 14, 1961
- Congregations: 43 (includes emerging groups)
- Members: 3,804 (dues-paying), 10,930 (self-identifying)
- Publications: CUC eNews
- Official website: cuc.ca

The Canadian Unitarian Council (French: Conseil unitarien du Canada) (CUC) is a liberal religious association of Unitarian Universalist congregations in Canada. The CUC was organized on May 14, 1961, one day before the American Unitarian Association and the Universalist Church of America, two denominations active in both the U.S. and Canada, consolidated to form the Unitarian Universalist Association (UUA).

Initially the CUC was the suborganization for Canadians belonging to the UUA. However, in 2002, the CUC formally became an independent denomination from the UUA, although the UUA continues to provide ministerial settlement services and remains the primary source for education and theological resources.

Some Canadian congregations maintain dual-affiliation with the CUC and the UUA, while most congregations are only members of the CUC. The Canadian Unitarian Council is the only national body for Unitarian Universalist congregations in Canada and was one of the seventeen members of the now defunct International Council of Unitarians and Universalists (1995–2021).

Current Unitarian Universalism in the CUC has moved beyond its historic roots in liberal Christianity, being defined as non-creedal, drawing syncretic wisdom from various religions and philosophies. Non-Christian influences include humanism, nontheism, pantheism, Buddhism, Hinduism, Judaism, Islam and Earth-centered spirituality (earth religion, modern paganism). The CUC regards itself as an LGBTQ-affirming denomination.

== Organization ==
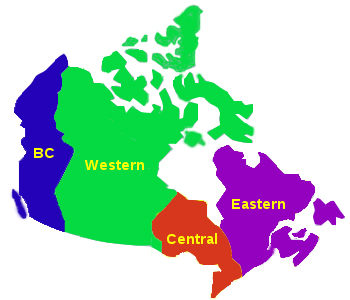
Map of the four CUC regions

The CUC is made up of 43 member congregations and emerging groups, who are the legal owners of the organization, and who are, for governance and service delivery, divided into four regions: "BC" (British Columbia), "Western" (Alberta to Thunder Bay), "Central" (between Thunder Bay and Kingston), and "Eastern" (Kingston, Ottawa and everything east of that). The organization as a whole is governed by the CUC Board of Trustees (Board), whose mandate it is to govern in the best interests of the CUC's owners. The Board is made up of eight members who are elected by congregational delegates at the CUC's Annual General Meeting. This consists of two Trustees from each region, who are eligible to serve a maximum of two three-year terms. Board meetings also include two Official Observers to the Board, who participate without a vote. One represents youth, the other represents ministers.

=== Service delivery ===
As members of the CUC, congregations and emerging groups are served by volunteer Service Consultants, Congregational Networks, and a series of other committees. There are two directors of regional services, one for the Western two regions, and one for the Eastern two regions. Youth and young adults are served by a Youth and Young Adult Ministry Development staff of two.

=== Annual conference and meeting ===
Policies and business of the CUC are determined at the Annual Conference and Meeting (ACM), consisting of the Bi-Annual Conference, in which workshops are held, and the Annual General Meeting, in which business matters and plenary meetings are performed. The ACM features two addresses, a Keynote and a Confluence Lecture. The Confluence Lecture is comparable to the UUA's Ware Lecture in prestige. In early days this event simply consisted of the Annual General Meeting component as the Annual Conference component was not added to much later. And starting in 2017 the conference portion will only take place every second year. Past ACMs have been held in the following locations:

Date	Location	Theme	Keynote	Confluence Lecturer
1985	London, ON			
1986				
1987				
1988	Saskatoon, SK			
1989	Hamilton, ON			
1990	Vancouver, BC			
1991	Winnipeg, MB			
1992	Montreal, QC			
1993	Ottawa, ON			
1994	Edmonton, AB			
1995	Toronto, ON			
1996	Halifax, NS			
1997	Thunder Bay, ON			
1998	Victoria, BC			
1999	Mississauga, ON			
2000	Calgary, AB			
May 18–21, 2001	Montreal, QC	Growing Together In Diversity and Strength		
May 17–20, 2002	Kelowna, BC	Renewing Our Strength	David Crawley	
May 16–19, 2003	Winnipeg, MB	Getting to the Heart of It	Rabbi Neal Rose and Carol Rose	Rev. Dr. John W. Baros-Johnson
May 21–24, 2004	Edmonton, AB	We Are the New Pioneers	Honourable Lois Hole	Rev. Ray Drennan
May 20–23, 2005	Hamilton, ON	Getting To Know UU	Susan Walsh	Rev. Susan Van Dreser
May 19–22, 2006	Saint John, NB	Riding the UU Tide	Dr. Allan Sharp	Rev. Peter Boulatta
May 18–21, 2007	Vancouver, BC	Diversity in Community	Rev. Bill Phipps	Rev. Christine E. Hillman
May 16–19, 2008	Ottawa, ON	The Web of Life – In our Hands	Will Brewer and Allison Brewer	Rev. Meg Roberts and Rev. Brian Kiely
May 15–18, 2009	Thunder Bay, ON	Answering the Call	Rev. Chris Buice	Rev. Dr. Stephen
May 21–24, 2010	Victoria, BC	How Shall We Live?	Dr. Paul Bramadat	Rev. Jane Bramadat and Rev. Wayne Walder
May 20–23, 2011	Toronto, ON	Trust the Dawning Future	David K. Foot	Rev. Diane Rollert
May 18–20, 2012^	Ottawa, ON	Spiritual Leadership Symposium	Rev. Erik Walker Wikstrom	
May 17–19, 2013	Calgary, AB	Diversity: Creating a Shared Understanding	Rev. Mark Morrison-Reed	Rev. Shawn Newton
May 16–18, 2014	Montreal, QC	Building Beloved CommUUnities: Sacred Spaces Beyond Walls	Rev. Meg Riley	Rev. Carly Gaylor and Rev. Jeffrey Brown
May 15–17, 2015	Ottawa, ON	Seeking Justice in a Changing Land	Matt Meyer	Rev. Stephen Atkinson
May 20–22, 2016	Vancouver, BC	Bolder Ways of Being		Rev. Melora Lyngood
May, 2018	Hamilton, ON			
May, 2019	Toronto, ON			
May, 2020	Virtual			
May, 2021	Virtual			
May 19–21, 2023	Ottawa, ON	Living into the 8th Principle	Albert Dumont	Rev. Julie Stoneberg

^Not an ACM, but an "Annual General Meeting" and "Symposium", and unlike ACMs it was organized by the CUC and the Unitarian Universalist Ministers of Canada instead of a local congregation. #Not a keynote presenter or lecturer, rather a symposium "provocateur". *Upcoming locations

=== Principles and sources ===
The CUC does not have a central creed in which members are required to believe, but they have found it useful to articulate their common values in what has become known as The Principles and Sources of our Religious Faith, which are currently based on the UUA's former Principles and Sources with the addition of an 8th principle adopted by CUC members at a special meeting on November 27, 2021. The CUC had a task force whose mandate was to consider revising them.

The principles and sources as published in church literature and on the CUC website:

The Principles and Sources of our Religious Faith

Principles

We, the member congregations of the Canadian Unitarian Council, covenant to affirm and promote:

- The inherent worth and dignity of every person;
- Justice, equity, and compassion in human relations;
- Acceptance of one another and encouragement to spiritual growth in our congregations;
- A free and responsible search for truth and meaning;
- The right of conscience and the use of the democratic process within our congregations and in society at large;
- The goal of world community with peace, liberty, and justice for all;
- Respect for the interdependent web of all existence of which we are a part;
- Individual and communal action that accountably dismantles racism and systemic barriers to full inclusion in ourselves and our institutions.

The living tradition which we share draws from many sources:

- Direct experience of that transcending mystery and wonder, affirmed in all cultures, which moves us to a renewal of the spirit and an openness to the forces which create and uphold life;
- Words and deeds of prophetic people which challenge us to confront powers and structures of evil with justice, compassion, and the transforming power of love
- Wisdom from the world's religions which inspires us in our ethical and spiritual life;
- Jewish and Christian teachings which call us to respond to God's love by loving our neighbours as ourselves;
- Humanist teachings which counsel us to heed the guidance of reason and the results of science, and warn us against idolatries of the mind and spirit;
- Spiritual teachings of Earth-centred traditions which celebrate the sacred circle of life and instruct us to live in harmony with the rhythms of nature.

Grateful for the religious pluralism which enriches and ennobles our faith, we are inspired to deepen our understanding and expand our vision. As free congregations we enter into this covenant, promising to one another our mutual trust and support.

=== Vision and mission ===
The CUC has two guiding documents; a vision statement which includes five aspirations, and a mission statement.

The CUC's vision and mission statements as published in church literature and on the CUC website:

Our Vision

As Canadian Unitarian Universalists, we envision a world in which our interdependence calls us to love and justice.

Eight principles guide our choices. Six sources nourish our spirits. (listed here)

Five aspirations help us grow.

As Canadian Unitarian Universalists, we aspire to be:

Deeply Connected: We strive to foster healthy relationships amongst and within UU communities, with the broader world and with all life.

Radically Inclusive: We strive to create hospitable, diverse, multi-generational communities.

Actively Engaged: We strive to work joyfully for a just and compassionate society, experimenting with new forms of community.

Theologically Alive: We seek to be ever-evolving in our understanding, open to new knowledge.

Spiritually Grounded: We seek transformation through personal spiritual experiences and shared ritual.

Our Mission

The Canadian Unitarian Council (CUC) is an organization of Unitarian and Unitarian Universalist member congregations acting to enhance, nurture, and promote the Unitarian and Unitarian Universalist religion in Canada.

The CUC is a beacon for Unitarian Universalist communities across Canada, providing them with leadership, support, and connection as they strive to foster a just and sustainable world and to enrich the spiritual lives of their members.

The CUC’s mission is to grow vital Unitarian Universalist communities.

=== Formation and relationship to the Unitarian Universalist Association ===
The CUC formed on May 14, 1961, to be the national organization for Canadians within the about-to-form UUA (it formed a day later on May 15, 1961). And until 2002, almost all member congregations of the CUC were also members of the UUA and most services to CUC member congregations were provided by the UUA. However, after an agreement between the UUA and the CUC, since 2002 most services have been provided by the CUC to its own member congregations, with the UUA continuing to provide ministerial settlement services. And also since 2002, some Canadian congregations have continued to be members of both the UUA and CUC while others are members of only the CUC.

The Canadian Unitarian Universalist youth of the day disapproved of the 2002 change in relationship between the CUC and UUA. It is quite evident in the words of this statement, which was adopted by the attendees of the 2001 youth conference held at the Unitarian Church of Montreal:

We the youth of Canada are deeply concerned about the direction the CUC seems to be taking. As stewards of our faith, adults have a responsibility to take into consideration the concerns of youth. We are opposed to making this massive jump in our evolutionary progress.

=== Canadian Unitarian Universalist Women's Association ===
The Canadian Unitarian Universalist Women's Association (CUUWA), established in May 2011, is a women's rights organization associated with the CUC. The CUUWA gained initial support from Prairie Women's Gathering and the Vancouver Island Women's retreat, and has since become a nationally recognized organization.

==== Mission ====
Originally called the Canadian Unitarian Universalist Women's Federation, the organization aims to raise awareness for women's education, rights, and equality of income. The association also aims to change societal attitudes about women and inform society of the issues women have faced locally and internationally. As a part of their mission, the CUUWA circulates educational materials that highlight women's contributions to society. The organization hosts an annual general meeting during the Canadian Unitarian Council Annual Conference.

=== List of Unitarian Universalist Congregations ===
Congregation Name	Province	Origins	Year Founded	Year Closed (if applicable)	External Link
Beacon Unitarian Church	New Westminster, British Columbia	Unitarian Universalism	1983		
Comox Valley Unitarian Fellowship	Comox, British Columbia	Unitarian Universalism	1961		http://www.cvuf.ca/
Capital Unitarian Universalist Congregation	Victoria, British Columbia	Unitarian Universalism	1996		http://www.unitariancongregation.org/capital/
First Unitarian Fellowship of Nanaimo	Nanaimo, British Columbia	Unitarian	1959		http://ufon.ca/
Kelowna Unitarians	Kelowna, British Columbia	Unitarian Universalism	1965		http://www.kelownaunitarians.ca/
Nelson Unitarian Spiritual Centre	Nelson, British Columbia	Unitarian	1959		https://www.facebook.com/NUSCWELCOME/
North Okanagan Unitarian Church	Vernon, British Columbia	Unitarian Universalism	1963	2006	
North Shore Unitarian Church	North Vancouver, British Columbia	Unitarian Universalism	1967		https://www.northshoreunitarians.ca/
Unitarian Fellowship of The Cowichan Valley	Duncan, British Columbia	Unitarian	1958	2006	
Unitarian Fellowship of Salt Spring Island	Salt Spring Island, British Columbia	Unitarian Universalism	2003		http://unitariancongregation.org/saltspring/
Unitarian Universalist Community of Victoria	Victoria, British Columbia	Unitarian	1950		http://victoriaunitarian.ca/
Unitarian Universalist Fellowship of Kamloops	Kamloops, British Columbia	Unitarian Universalism	1963	2022	
Unitarian Universalists of the Salish Sea	North Vancouver, British Columbia	Unitarian Universalism	2024		http://www.uusalishsea.ca/
Vancouver Unitarians	Vancouver, British Columbia	Unitarian	1909		http://vancouverunitarians.ca/
Calgary Unitarians	Calgary, Alberta	Unitarian	1951		https://calgaryunitarians.ca/
Unitarian Church of Edmonton	Edmonton, Alberta	Unitarian	1951		http://www.uce.ca/
Unitarian Fellowship of Red Deer	Red Deer, Alberta	Unitarian Universalism	1966	2019	
Unitarian Universalist Fellowship of Lethbridge	Lethbridge, Alberta	Unitarian Universalism	1966	2021	
Westwood Unitarian Congregation	Edmonton, Alberta	Unitarian	1982		http://www.westwoodunitarian.ca/
Unitarian Fellowship of Regina	Regina, Saskatchewan	Unitarian	1952		https://reginaunitarians.ca/
Saskatoon Unitarians	Saskatoon, Saskatchewan	Unitarian	1956		https://ucsaskatoon.org/
Wynyard Unitarian Church	Wynyard, Saskatchewan	Icelandic Lutheran Synod	1906	2011	
Arborg Unitarian Church	Arborg, Manitoba	Icelandic Lutheran Synod	1891 (switched to Unitarian)		
First Unitarian Universalist Church of Winnipeg	Winnipeg, Manitoba	Unitarian and Icelandic Lutheran Synod	1891		http://www.uuwinnipeg.mb.ca/
Gimli Unitarians	Gimli, Manitoba	Icelandic Lutheran Synod	1891 (switched to Unitarian)	2024	
Albert Schweitzer Unitarian Universalist Fellowship	London, Ontario	Unitarian Universalism		2000	
Don Heights Unitarian Congregation	Toronto, Ontario	Unitarian	1954/1955 (merger of Birch Cliff and Don Mills)		http://www.donheights.ca/
Elora and Fergus Unitarian Universalist Church	Elora, Ontario and Fergus, Ontario	Unitarian Universalism	2000	2020	
First Unitarian Church of Hamilton	Hamilton, Ontario	Unitarian	1949		https://uuhamilton.ca/
First Unitarian Congregation of Ottawa	Ottawa, Ontario	Unitarian	1898		http://www.firstunitarianottawa.ca/
First Unitarian Congregation of Toronto	Toronto, Ontario	Unitarian	1845		http://www.firstunitariantoronto.org/
Grand River Unitarian Congregation	Kitchener, Ontario	Unitarian	1956		https://www.grandriverunitarian.ca/
Huronia Unitarian Fellowship	Orillia, Ontario	Unitarian	1959		https://www.huuf.ca/
Kingston Unitarian Fellowship	Kingston, Ontario	Unitarian	1958		http://www.kuf.ca/
Lakehead Unitarian Fellowship	Thunder Bay, Ontario	Unitarian	1958		http://www.luf.ca/
Neighbourhood Unitarian Universalist Congregation	Toronto, Ontario	Unitarian Universalism	1999		https://nuuc.ca/
Quinte Unitarian Fellowship	Belleville, Ontario	Unitarian Universalism		2001	
Stratford Unitarians	Stratford, Ontario	Unitarian Universalism			https://unitarianstratford.org/
Unitarian Congregation of Guelph	Guelph, Ontario	Unitarian	1959		https://guelph-unitarians.com/
Unitarian Congregation of Niagara	St. Catharines, Ontario	Unitarian	1954		http://www.unitarian-stcatharines.org/
Unitarian Congregation in Mississauga	Mississauga, Ontario	Unitarian	1954		http://uucm.ca/
Unitarian Fellowship of Chatham	Chatham, Ontario	Unitarian Universalism	1966	1989	
Unitarian Fellowship of London	London, Ontario	Unitarian	1953		http://www.unitarianfellowshipoflondon.org/
Unitarian Fellowship of Northwest Toronto	Toronto, Ontario	Unitarian	1959		http://www.ufnwt.com/
Unitarian Fellowship of Peterborough	Peterborough, Ontario	Unitarian	1961		https://peterboroughunitarian.ca//
Unitarian Fellowship of Sarnia-Port Huron	Sarnia, Ontario	Unitarian	1959		https://www.uusarnia.com/
Unitarian Universalist Church of Olinda	Olinda, Ontario	Universalist	1880	-	http://uuolinda.org/
Unitarian Universalist Congregation of Durham	Pickering, Ontario	Unitarian Universalism	1997		http://www.uucd.ca/
Unitarian Universalist Fellowship of Discovery (Unitarian Church of Port Dover)	Port Dover, Ontario	Unitarian	1860	2000	
Unitarian Universalist Fellowship of Ottawa	Ottawa, Ontario	Unitarian Universalism	1996		http://uufo.org/
Unitarian Universalist International Fellowship of Sault Ste. Marie	Ontario	Unitarian Universalism	1966	1989	
Unitarian Universalists of Windsor Region	Windsor, Ontario	Unitarian	1958	2010	
Huntingville Universalist Church	Huntingville, Quebec	Universalist	1845	1951	
Lakeshore Unitarian Universalist Congregation	Lachine, Quebec (formerly Beaconsfield, Quebec)	Unitarian	1953		http://luuc.org/
Unitarian Church of Montreal	Montreal, Quebec	Unitarian	1832		http://www.ucmtl.ca/
Unitarian Universalist Church of North Hatley	North Hatley, Quebec	Universalist	1886		http://www.uuestrie.ca/
Unitarian Fellowship of Fredericton	Fredericton, New Brunswick	Unitarian	1959		http://www.uff.ca/
Unitarian Fellowship of Moncton	Moncton, New Brunswick	Unitarian Universalism	1966	1996	
Unitarian Universalist Church of Saint John	Saint John, New Brunswick	Universalist	1874 / 1963	1906 / 2023	
Unitarian Fellowship of Prince Edward Island	Charlottetown, Prince Edward Island	Unitarian Universalism	1988	2017	
Universalist Unitarian Community of Halifax	Halifax, Nova Scotia	Universalist	1837		http://www.uuch.ca/
Avalon Unitarian Fellowship	St. John's, Newfoundland and Labrador	Unitarian Universalism	1999	2010	

== See also ==
- Canadian Unitarians for Social Justice
- Christian universalism
- Flaming chalice
- List of Unitarian, Universalist, and Unitarian Universalist churches
- Lotta Hitschmanova
- Singing the Living Tradition
- Unitarianism
- Unitarian Universalism and LGBTQ people
