= Stand Against Violence =

British charity

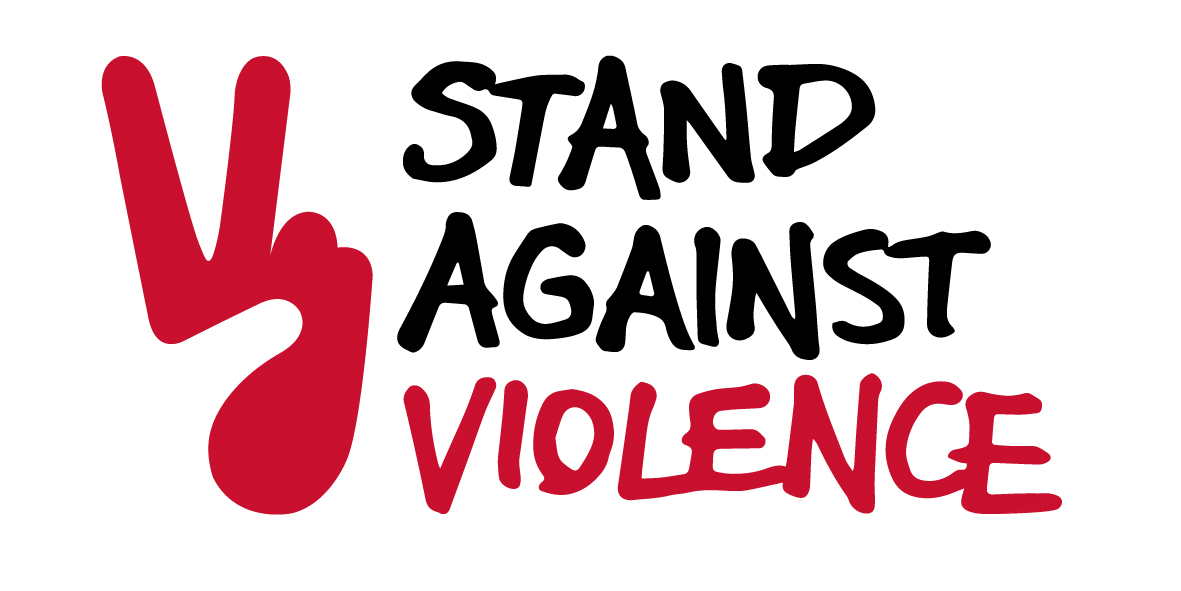
Stand Against Violence logo

Stand Against Violence is a charity focusing on violence prevention across England and Wales with a unique and impacting approach to educate pupils about violence and its consequences. The charity uses the violence prevention evidence base to target educational interventions at the contributing factors to violence.

== Background ==
Originally called the 'Campaign for Lloyd' the campaign was set up by Adam Fouracre, the older brother of Lloyd Fouracre, who was murdered on 25 September 2005. The original agenda was to increase police presence within the local area, and also giving talks to local schools about Lloyd and the effects of violence. The campaign changed direction following a disappointing government meeting and a loss of momentum within schools.

Stand Against Violence was established as a charity in 2010 and focuses on developing and delivering educational resources and workshops which are delivered as part of the PSHE/Citizenship curriculum. The aim of the core workshop is to educate young people about the effects of violence. The original resources and workshops are aimed at secondary school students and other organisations that work with young people, and includes a short film, followed by interactive activities and discussion, all of which satisfy several sections of the national curriculum. The charity also delivers:

- Primary aged workshops
- Anti bullying workshops
- Substance abuse workshops
- Personal safety
- First aid
- Workshops for young prisoners and youth offending teams

=== Lloyd Fouracre ===
17-year-old Lloyd Fouracre was leaving a friend's 18th birthday party on 25 September 2005 in Taunton, Somerset, when he and his friends were attacked by a group of youths.

He was hit over the head with a wooden parking sign, rendering him unconscious. His attackers then continued to beat Lloyd until they were interrupted by a passing car.

Lloyd was taken to Musgrove Park Hospital, where he was pronounced dead 30 minutes later. A post-mortem examination revealed Lloyd had suffered fractures to the skull, cheekbone, jaw, eye socket, nasal bone and suffered multiple brain haemorrhages. He was due to turn 18 on 26 September 2005, the day after he died.

=== The trial ===
The trial was held at Exeter Crown Court and lasted for four weeks.

Andrew Betty and Jay Wall were both convicted of murder at Exeter Crown court on 5 August 2006. Betty was sentenced to 13 years in prison, and Wall to 12 years. Ross McCormack was cleared of murder and manslaughter. A fourth and fifth teen were also arrested, but released without charge.

=== Petition to the government ===
During the trial, Adam Fouracre, Lloyd's brother and the Taunton Deane community signed a petition, which was then presented to the Home Office Minister Paul Goggins at Downing Street. The petition called for more police on the streets, but unfortunately the meeting ended without result.

=== The film ===
Adam Fouracre then produced an education film as part of the Stand Against Violence campaign, which was funded by donations and a grant from Taunton Deane Borough Council, and was made with the help of people who gave their time and skills for free.

==== Synopsis ====
This film aims to get young people thinking about the consequences to their actions. The film re enacts the true story of the murder of Lloyd Fouracre who was brutally beaten to death in 2005. The film also contains friend and family interviews as well as home video footage and news reports.

This moving, emotional short film aims to shock young people so they can see the harsh reality that is modern day violence.

The re enactment is based on eye witness accounts and the information we heard in court. It is a true reconstruction with no dramatization. We wanted to show the truth in this project rather than glorify or dramatise the violence.

After focusing on Lloyd’s story the film then becomes more general to give a clear, nationwide message about violence and how it is up to us to reduce it.

== SAV's Evidence Base ==
Stand Against Violence offers workshops to organisations working with young people aged 10–25 yrs. An independent evaluation conducted by the Centre for Public Health in 2014 showed that young people who were exposed to the core violence prevention workshops showed statistically significant improvements in young peoples attitudes towards violence, with them being less likely to resort to violence as a means of conflict resolution. This was maintained for the 6 week follow up survey which shows promising evidence of long term attitude change.

=== PSHE ===
The Stand Against Violence workshops fit within the PSHE and citizenship curriculum for Key Stage 2, 3, and 4.

An example of Key Stage 3 curriculum points covered include:

Key Concepts

- 1.1 Personal identities
- 1.3 Risk
- 1.4 Relationships

Key Processes

- 2.1 Critical reflection
- 2.2 Decision-making and managing risk

== SAV within the community ==
Stand Against Violence launched a National Day of Non-Violence in 2016. The UN promote an international day of non-violence but there is nothing to date in the UK. Therefore, to mark the anniversary of Lloyd's death and the charities inception 25 September will be a national day of non-violence. SAV promotes thi day online, using posters and distributing ribbons for people to wear to show support.

In 2017 National Day of Non-Violence has been expanded for the month of September. September will now become 'Make a Stand Month' where the charity encourages people to show support and make their own Stand Against Violence through awareness raising and fundraising activities

=== Anne Frank Trust ===
Working in conjunction with The Anne Frank Trust UK, SAV has given a talk in London to young people about SAV the campaign and how it began. The Anne Frank Trust will be working with young people who want to start their own campaigns using people and organisations who already run campaigns to offer advice.

== Charity Status ==
Stand Against Violence became a registered charity in March 2010 (charity #1135475). It has since become a Charitable Incorporated Organisation in 2015 (charity #1156451). The charity aims to maintain a board of 8-10 trustees and keep a wide skill set within the board.
