= Relationship and Sex Education =

British form of sex education

Relationship and Sex Education (RSE), formerly Sex and Relationships Education (SRE), is a form of sex education taught in UK schools. SRE focuses on exploring the emotional, social and physical aspects of growing up, having relationships, engaging in sex, and learning about human sexuality and sexual health.

On 1 March 2017, the UK Minister for Education Justine Greening released a statement that in the UK that the term Sex and Relationship Education would be changed to Relationship and Sex Education.

== United Kingdom ==
Sex and Relationship Education is designed to equip children and young people with the information, skills and values to have safe, fulfilling and enjoyable relationships and to take responsibility for their sexual health and well-being. The private areas of the body and the scientific names for body parts are taught to some as young as age four.

The UK Learning and Skills Act 2000 requires that:

- young people learn about the nature of marriage and its importance for family life and bringing up children.
- young people are protected from teaching and materials which are inappropriate, having regard to the age and the religious and cultural background of the pupils concerned.
- school governing bodies have regard for the guidance.
- parents have the right to withdraw their child from all or part of SRE provided outside national curriculum science.

Following sustained political pressure, in March 2017 it was announced by the Department for Education (DFE) that from September 2019 Relationship Education (RE) in primary schools and Relationship and Sex Education (RSE) in secondary schools will be made mandatory in England by the UK government.

A consultation was held by the DfE from 19 December 2017 to 12 February 2018 to inform the updated guidelines that will be released prior to the new mandatory subject being added to the curriculum in England in 2019.

=== Wales ===
In Wales, RSE is governed by the Relationships and Sexuality Education (RSE) Code. RSE must include relationships and identity; sexual health and well-being; empowerment, safety and respect and must develop awareness on views and values and a diversity of relationships, gender and sexuality, including LGBTQ+ lives.

=== Northern Ireland ===
In Northern Ireland, RSE is governed by the Relationships and Sexuality Education Progression Framework. It shows how the different themes cover the following priority areas of RSE:

- Consent;
- Developments in Contraception;
- Domestic and Sexual Violence and Abuse;
- Healthy, Positive Sexual Expression and Relationships;
- Internet Safety;
- LGBTQ+ Matters;
- Social Media and Its Effects on Relationships and Self-Esteem;
- Teen Parenting; and
- Menstrual Wellbeing.

=== Scotland ===
In Scotland, RSE is known as RSHP ("Relationships, Sexual Health and Parenthood") and is governed by guidance published by the Scottish government and is designed to teach pupils about making informed decisions about relationships, sexual health and parenthood with regard to their wellbeing.

=== Crown Dependencies ===
==== Guernsey ====
In Guernsey, RSE is known as SHARE ("Sexual Health and Relationship Education") and is governed by guidance published by the States of Guernsey and covers STIs, puberty, consent, pregnancy and the difference between healthy and unhealthy relationships.

==== Jersey ====
In Jersey, RSE is known as SRE and is governed by guidance published by the States of Jersey and covers physical, emotional, psychological, sexual and moral development.

==== Isle of Man ====
On the Isle of Man, RSE is governed by guidance published by the Isle of Man Government and covers relationships with family, friends, employers, colleagues, intimate relationships and connection with their wider communities.

== Australia ==
=== Victorian ===
The Victorian Government (Australia) developed a policy for the promotion of Health and Human Relations Education in schools in 1980 that was introduced into the State's primary and secondary schools during 1981. The initiative was developed and implemented by the Honorable Norman Lacy MP, Minister for Educational Services from 1979–1982.

A Consultative Council for Health and Human Relations Education was established in December 1980 under the chairmanship of Dame Margaret Blackwood; its members possessed considerable expertise in the area.

The Council had three major functions:

1. to advise and to be consulted on all aspects of Health and Human Relations' Education in schools;
2. to develop, for consideration of the Government, appropriate curriculum for schools;
3. to advise and recommend the standards for in-service courses for teachers and relevant members of the school community.

Support services for the Consultative Council were provided by a new Health and Human Relations Unit within the Special Services Division of the Education Department of Victoria and was responsible for the implementation of the Government's policy and guidelines in this area. The Unit advised principals, school councils, teachers, parents, tertiary institutions and others in all aspects of Health and Human Relations Education.

In 1981, the Consultative Council recommended the adoption of a set of guidelines for the provision of Health and Human Relations Education in schools as well as a Curriculum Statement to assist schools in the development of their programs. These were presented to the Victorian Cabinet in December 1981 and adopted as Government policy.
