= About Your Sexuality =

About Your Sexuality, or AYS, was a comprehensive sex education course published by the Unitarian Universalist Association in 1970, with further revisions in 1973, 1978 and 1983. The course materials were originally developed by Deryck Calderwood. Although made available to other organizations, the materials were primarily used in courses taught to youth ages 12–14 (in mixed-gender groups) in Unitarian Universalist congregations.

AYS covered many topics including anatomy, gender identity, relationships, sexual intercourse and intimacy; as well as covering sexually transmitted diseases and birth control. AYS was based on the assumption that sexuality is a natural and healthy part of being a human. It considered the wide range of sexual feelings and behaviors as normal. AYS was unique among sex education courses because it used visual materials that depicted human sexuality in a realistic and graphic fashion. For example, film strips used in the course showed images of real heterosexual and homosexual encounters, and masturbation. Other media used in the course of AYS included audio tapes of interviews with transgender, homosexual, and heterosexual men and women speaking about their sexuality.

AYS was replaced by Our Whole Lives in the 1990s. It was also featured in the book Harmful to Minors by Judith Levine as an example of complete sexual education.

== See also ==
- Unitarian Universalism and LGBTQ people
