= Sex education =

Instruction on human sexuality issues

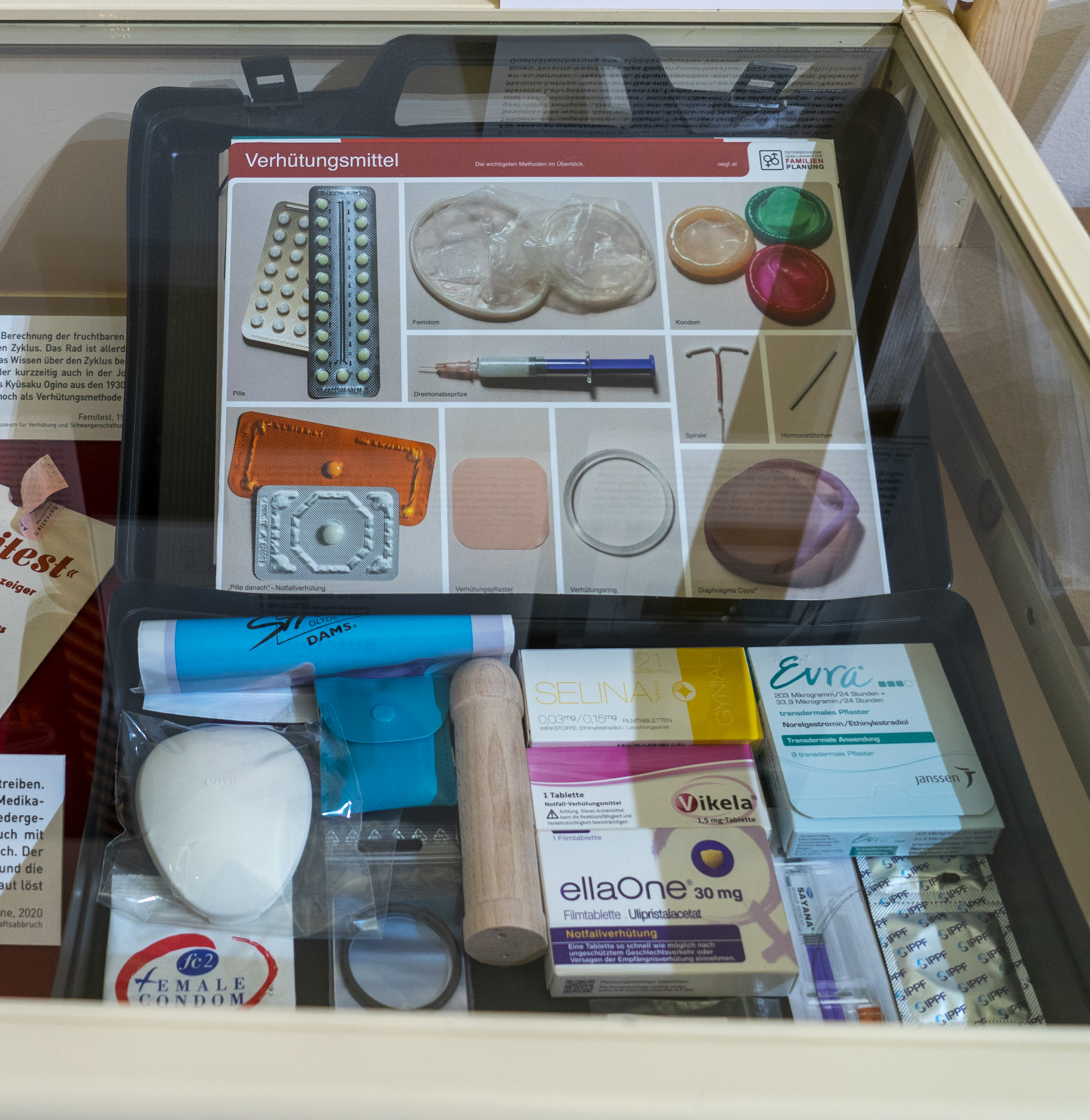
Example of a pedagogical tool: The Austrian Sexkoffer, a "suitcase" of sex education materials used in Austrian schools in the late 1980s, including a booklet intended to explain contraception during sexual education sessions (District Museum Josefstadt, Vienna, Austria)

Sex education, also known as sexual education, sexuality education or sex ed, is the instruction of issues relating to human sexuality, including human sexual anatomy, sexual activity, sexual reproduction, safe sex, birth control, sexual and reproductive health, emotional relationships and responsibilities, age of consent, and reproductive rights.

Sex education that includes all of these issues is known as comprehensive sexuality education. In contrast, abstinence-only sex education, which focuses solely on promoting sexual abstinence, is often favored in more socially conservative regions, including some parts of the United States.

Sex education may be provided as part of school programs, public health campaigns, or by parents or caregivers. In some countries, it is known as "relationships and sexual health education".

Many governments see it as beneficial to provide public education on such matters before or at the beginning of puberty to improve public health, to limit the spread of sexually transmitted infections, and to avoid teenage pregnancy and unwanted pregnancies later on.

== History ==
In multiple cultures, the discussion of all sexual issues has traditionally been considered taboo, and adolescents were not given any information on sexual matters. Such instruction, as was given, was traditionally left to a child's parents, and it was often put off until just before their marriage. However, in the late 19th century, the progressive education movement led to the introduction of sex education as "social hygiene" in North American school curricula and the introduction of school-based sex education.

During the Second World War, UK governmental concerns grew around mass relocation, parentless youths, and young men and women working together for the first time. Not only were there fears of new sexually transmitted diseases, but there was also growing anxiety around young pregnancy, putting pressure on the war-ravaged economy and healthcare system. As such, the UK Board for Education introduced the Sex Education in Schools and Youth Organizations guidance. This placed the onus of sex education on schools and youth groups and guided leaders on how to implement it. For example, the mechanics of sexual intercourse could be communicated via "the keeping of livestock", as students could observe reproduction in real-time; the guidance also encouraged discussions about menstruation, motherhood courses, and personal hygiene talks. Popular among teachers and some parents, this guidance – which made sex education a possibility, not an obligation – prevailed for many years in the UK.

After the Second World War, some developing countries promoted sex education programs that evolved to address political goals. A growing anxiety in some areas of the world over rising birth rates led to population-centered sex education programs. For instance, the first sex education curriculum in Singapore between 1966 and 1973 emphasized birth control as a way to avoid overpopulation. Reforms in some socialist countries focused on the role of sex education in strengthening family ties within society. This was the focus of sex education programs that developed in the German Democratic Republic (GDR) and Cuba during the late twentieth century. The evolving content of sex education programs reflected shifting opinions regarding sexuality within each society. For example, Swedish sex education guidelines and textbooks published between 1945 and 2000 originally depicted masturbation as inherently harmful but increasingly portrayed it as natural and harmless.

The Catholic Church referred to the need for "a positive and prudent sexual education" in its 1965 Declaration on Christian Education, one of the documents issued by the Second Vatican Council.

In the 1970s, informational films became popular among teachers. Martin Cole's Growing Up (1971) was a frank look at how sex works physiologically and socially. It showed real clips of penises and masturbation, which sparked some backlash. However, it became apparent in the 1980s that a frank and factual approach was required in sex education as the HIV/AIDS crisis began in the UK. In 1999, the Labour government introduced Sex and Relationships Education guidance, with particular focus on sexually transmitted diseases and teenage pregnancy. This was part of the ten-year Teenage Pregnancy Strategy, which would eventually be resolved in 2010. Teenage pregnancy rates were halved across this period; similar changes in other countries indicate that this was not an effect of the strategy.

Globally, the outbreak of AIDS has given a new sense of urgency to sex education. In multiple African countries where AIDS is at epidemic levels (see HIV/AIDS in Africa), sex education is seen by most scientists as a vital public health strategy. Some international organizations such as Planned Parenthood consider that broad sex education programs have global benefits, such as controlling the risk of overpopulation and advancing women's rights, including reproductive rights. The use of mass media campaigns has sometimes resulted in high levels of awareness coupled with essentially superficial knowledge of HIV transmission.

According to SIECUS, the Sexuality Information and Education Council of the United States, 93% of adults they surveyed support sexuality education in high school, and 84% support it in junior high school. In fact, 88% of the parents of junior high school students and 80% of parents of secondary school students believe that sex education in school makes it easier for them to talk to their adolescents about sex. Also, 92% of adolescents report that they want both to talk to their parents about sex and to have comprehensive in-school sex education. Furthermore, a "study, conducted by Mathematica Policy Research on behalf of the US Department of Health and Human Services, found that abstinence-only-until-marriage programs are ineffective."

The current frontier in the development of relationship and sex education (RSE) is LGBTQ+ inclusion. The recent 2019 guidance update is tentative in its acknowledgment of LGBT people, something which has proved controversial among homo- and transphobic groups, as well as among LGBT allies and pro-inclusion sociologists. For example, while Birmingham primary schools were protested by Muslim parents opposing the introduction of LGBT content to the guidance, sociologist Jonathan Glazzard criticized the Department for Education for the document's ambiguity and "opt-out" potential. The inclusion of this form of sex education is argued to make LGBT students feel more included, and that feelings of safety would foster healthy developmental outcomes for this group.

== Definitions ==
Leepson sees sex education as instruction in various physiological, psychological, and sociological aspects of sexual response and reproduction. Kearney (2008) also defined sex education as "involving a comprehensive course of action by the school, calculated to bring about the socially desirable attitudes, practices and personal conduct on the part of children and adults, that will best protect the individual as a human and the family as a social institution."

Thus, sex education may also be described as "sexuality education", which means that it encompasses education about all aspects of sexuality, including information about family planning, reproduction (fertilization, conception and development of the embryo and fetus, through to childbirth), plus information about all aspects of one's sexuality including: body image, sexual orientation, sexual pleasure, values, decision making, communication, dating, relationships, sexually transmitted infections (STIs) and how to avoid them, and birth control methods.

Various aspects of sex education are considered appropriate in school depending on the age of the students or what the children can comprehend at a particular point in time. Rubin and Kindendall expressed that sex education is not merely the topics of reproduction and teaching how babies are conceived and born. Instead, it has a far richer scope and goal of helping children incorporate sex more meaningfully into their present and future life, and to provide them with some basic understanding of virtually every aspect of sex by the time they reach full maturity.

Sex education delivered via in-person classroom instruction and workshops led by teachers or trained sex educators is commonly referred to as school-based sex education.

== Impacts of sex education ==
The United Nations Population Fund (UNFPA) recommends comprehensive sexuality education, as it enables young people to make informed decisions about their sexuality. According to UNFPA, it is taught over several years, introducing age-appropriate information consistent with the evolving capacities of young people. It includes scientifically accurate, curriculum-based information about human development, anatomy, and pregnancy. It also includes information about contraception and sexually transmitted infections (STIs), including HIV. And it goes beyond information to encourage confidence and improved communication skills. According to UNFPA, curricula should also address the social issues surrounding sexuality and reproduction, including cultural norms, family life, and interpersonal relationships.

=== The reach of comprehensive sexual education ===
A U.S. review concludes that "the overwhelming weight of evidence shows that sex education that discusses contraception does not increase sexual activity". The 2007 study found that "No comprehensive program hastened the initiation of sex or increased the frequency of sex, results that many people fear." Additionally, the report showed "Comprehensive programs worked for both genders, for all major ethnic groups, for sexually inexperienced and experienced teens, in different settings, and in different communities."

Further, evidence shows that a combination of comprehensive sexuality education and access to birth control appears to decrease the rates of unintended pregnancies among teenagers. A meta-analysis that compared comprehensive sexuality education programs with abstinence-only programs found that abstinence-only programs did not reduce the likelihood of pregnancy, but rather may have increased it. Studies show that curricula providing accurate information about condoms and contraception can lead to reductions in the risky behaviors reported by young people as well as reductions in unintended pregnancies and STIs. Programs that teach only abstinence are ineffective. The individuals in this study were also found to be less likely to engage in violent relationships and to have a lower rate of STIs (including HIV) and unintended pregnancy.

Other studies have found that "few sexual health interventions are designed with input from adolescents. Adolescents have suggested that sex education should be more positive with less emphasis on anatomy and scare tactics; it should focus on negotiation skills in sexual relationships and communication; and details of sexual health clinics should be advertised in areas that adolescents frequent (for example, school toilets, shopping centers)."

According to the United Nations Population Fund, human rights issues, gender equality, and gender roles should be integrated into every aspect of these discussions. This includes human rights protection, fulfillment, and empowerment; the impact of gender discrimination; the importance of equality and gender-sensitivity; and the ideas underlying gender roles.

=== Sexual rights/violence discussions ===
The United Nations Population Fund argues that sexual abuse, gender-based violence, and harmful practices should be discussed according to the global organization on reproductive rights. By definition, sexual assault is any sexual activity without clear, voluntary, and ongoing verbal consent, through force, manipulation, or coercion. Sexual violence is a deep-rooted issue in current society, stemming from a need for power and control. It is further propagated by societal norms that tolerate inequality. Taken together to form comprehensive sex education, all this information teaches young people the life skills necessary to assume responsibility for their own behavior and to respect the rights of others."

Comprehensive sexual education “enables young people to make informed decisions about their sexuality and health,” allowing for younger generations to understand concepts of human rights and gender equality. Such skills have been shown to lead to better-informed decisions regarding sex, sexual violence, and consent.

Including this information in Sex Ed courses not only shows what consent looks like but also breaks free of societal norms that lead to violence and teaches students to recognize signs of assault or abuse. Research shows that people who receive comprehensive sex ed are better equipped to speak out against negative behaviors, support victims, and respect the boundaries of others. Studies concluded that by bringing in this knowledge at an early age, correct morals during sexual interactions are ingrained in their lives and will allow them to apply this knowledge in their futures to help victims and speak out against aggressors, allowing them to build safer communities.

However, sexual violence is not always physical; it can be emotional, mental, and psychological manipulation as well. Broader systems of oppression, such as racism and sexism, often reinforce societal beliefs that normalize abuse, while the media and everyday jokes have created environments where sexism, objectification, and violence have become easily dismissed.

Additionally, according to UNFPA, "A 2010 review found that 'gender-focused' curricula – meaning curricula that integrate gender equality into the learning material – were substantially more effective in reducing risky behaviors than programs that did not consider gender." Research has also shown that delay in sexual initiation and the use of condoms and other contraception have been a result of young people adopting egalitarian attitudes towards gender roles.

== Case studies ==
=== US study on sex-ed and college violence ===
In the United States, sex-ed curricula, most of which are abstinence-only and abstinence-plus approaches, don't include education on consent or on prevention of sexual violence. While 29 out of 50 states (plus DC) mandate Sex-Ed to be taught in schools, only 16 states (plus DC) mandate the teaching of consent in sexual education, which Caulfield et al. argue has negative effects on the way consent and rape are managed in a collegiate environment.

Caulfield et al. conducted a 2024 experiment to examine the effects of different kinds of sexual education on college students’ experiences with sexual violence and rape myth acceptance. In doing their study, they contacted over 600 students, and measured their level of acceptance of rape myths, experience with sexual violence, and type of sexual education received. Their results indicated that those who received comprehensive sexual education during high school were 2.5 times more likely to be taught about consent than those who did not receive comprehensive sex education, indicating that consent education is commonly part of comprehensive sex-ed. Further, the study found that those who were taught consent had a 51% lower likelihood of being sexually victimized than those who were not taught consent.

=== US–Netherlands study on attitudes towards sex ===
When places have more comprehensive sexuality education, STI and pregnancy rates drop. The attitudes of children have also been found to differ depending on the content of their sex education. One comparison of results can be made between the sex education curriculum in the Netherlands and that in the US. On average teens in Europe and the Netherlands (which have more comprehensive sex ed) do not have sex at a younger age than teens in the US (with less comprehensive sex ed); however teens in the Netherlands report having a positive and consensual first sexual experience while 66% of sexually active US teens report that they wished they waited longer for their first sexual experience.

Nine out of ten teens in the Netherlands use contraception during their first sexual experience, which contributes to the lower pregnancy and STI rates. More comprehensive sex ed starting at the elementary level resulted in appreciation of sexual diversity, dating and intimate partner violence prevention, development of healthy relationships, prevention of child sex abuse, improved social/emotional learning, and increased media literacy.

== Sources ==
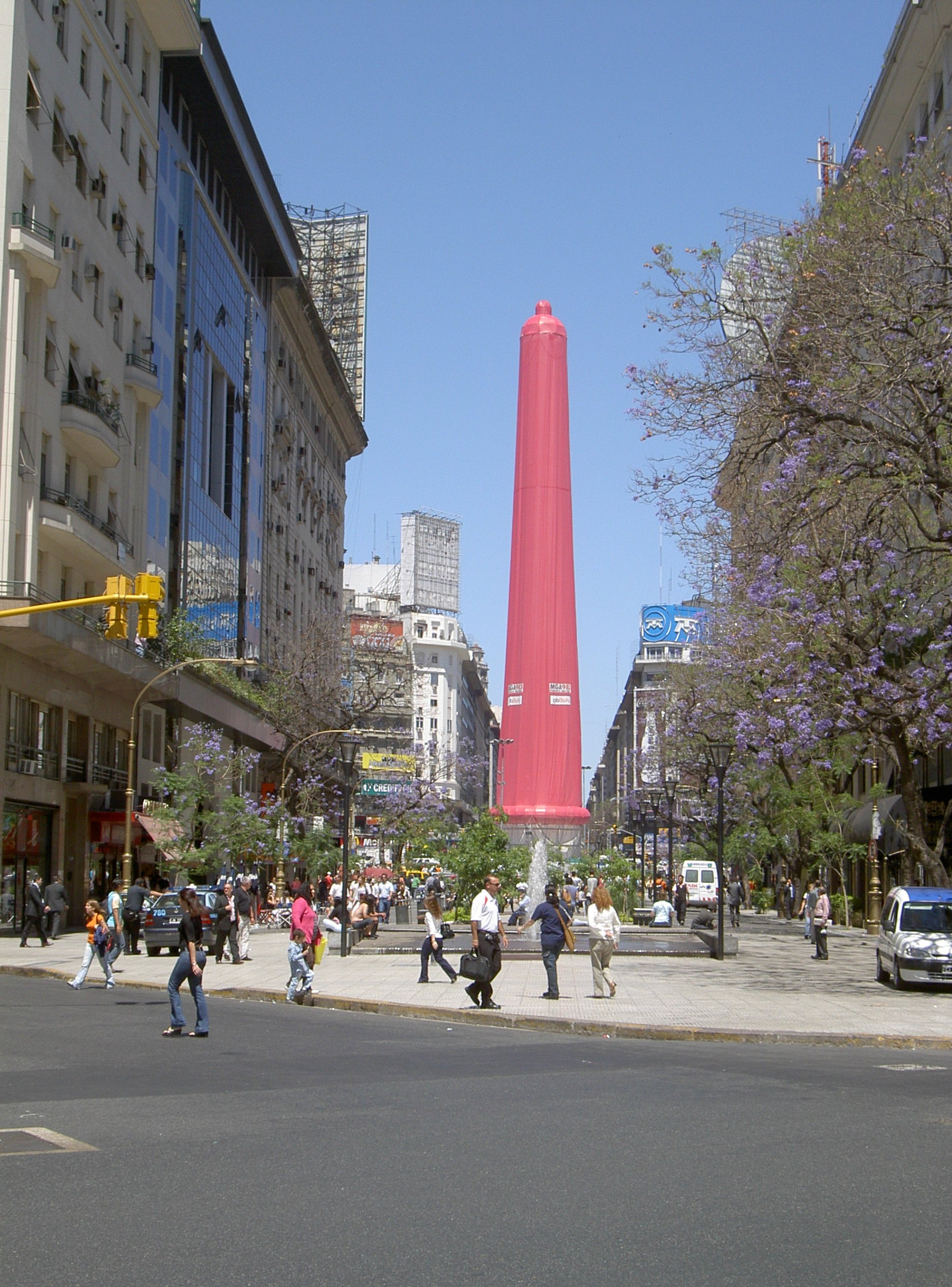
A 67 m (220 ft) long "condom" on the Obelisk of Buenos Aires, Argentina, part of an awareness campaign for the 2005 World AIDS Day

Sex education may be taught informally, such as when someone receives information from a conversation with a parent, friend, religious leader, or through the media. It may also be delivered through sex self-help authors, magazine advice columnists, sex columnists, or sexual education discussion board web sites. Sex education training for parents and educators can also be accessed on the internet through multimedia educational resources, including short videos, created by master sexuality educators. Adolescents spend a lot of their time on social media, or watching television. Those same adolescents may also have a hard time talking to their families about sexual matters. A study has shown that mass media interventions; for example, use of teaching sexual education through commercials shown on television, or ads on social media, have proven effective and decreased the amount of unprotected sex. Formal sex education occurs when schools or health care providers offer sex education. Slyer stated that sex education teaches the young person what they should know for their personal conduct and relationship with others. Gruenberg also stated that sex education is necessary to prepare the young for the task ahead. According to him, officials generally agree that some kind of planned sex education is necessary.

Sometimes formal sex education is taught as a full course in the curriculum at junior high school or high school. Other times, it is only one unit within a broader biology, health, home economics, or physical education class. Some schools offer no sex education, since it remains a controversial issue in several countries, particularly the United States (especially concerning the age at which children should start receiving such education, the amount of detail that is revealed, including LGBT sex education, and topics dealing with human sexual behavior, e.g., safe sex practices, masturbation, premarital sex, and sexual ethics).

Wilhelm Reich commented that sex education of his time was a work of deception, focusing on biology while concealing excitement-arousal, which is what a pubescent individual is mostly interested in. Reich added that this emphasis obscures what he believed to be a basic psychological principle: that all worries and difficulties originate from unsatisfied sexual impulses. Leepson asserted that the majority of people favor some sex instruction in public schools, and this has become an intensely controversial issue because, unlike most subjects, sex education is concerned with an especially sensitive and highly personal part of human life. He suggested that sex education should be taught in the classroom. The problem of pregnancy in adolescents is delicate and difficult to assess using sex education. But Calderone believed otherwise, stating that the answer to adolescents' sexual woes and pregnancy can not lie primarily in school programmes which at best can only be remedial; what is needed is prevention education, and as such, parents should be involved.

When sex education is contentiously debated, the chief controversial points are whether covering child sexuality is valuable or detrimental; whether LGBT sex education should be integrated into the curriculum; the use of birth control such as condoms and hormonal contraception; and the impact of such use on pregnancy outside marriage, teenage pregnancy, and the transmission of STIs. Increasing support for abstinence-only sex education by conservative groups has been one of the primary causes of this controversy. Countries with conservative attitudes towards sex education (including the UK and the U.S.) have a higher incidence of STIs and teenage pregnancy. On the other hand, it seems that in countries where sex education is not part of the curriculum, students show limited knowledge even in basic reproductive issues. For example, in a 2019 study with Greek students, it is reported that about two-thirds of the students failed to name external female genitals, such as the clitoris and labia, even after detailed pictures were provided to them. An editorial of the Journal of Biological Education in 2026 calls for a shift in the way biology education presents reproduction, i.e. the current emphasis on procreation be complemented by a strong focus on sexual pleasure. It is suggested that this could be achieved by increasing attention to the external female reproductive organs and the physiology of sexual arousal.

== Public opinion ==
A survey conducted in Britain, Canada, and the United States by Angus Reid Public Opinion in November 2011 asked adult respondents to look back to their teenage years and describe how useful several sources were in helping them learn more about sex. By far, the largest proportion of respondents in the three countries (74% in Canada, 67% in Britain, and 63% in the United States) said that conversations with friends were "very useful" or "moderately useful." The next most reputable source was the media (television, books, movies, magazines), which was mentioned by three-in-five Britons (65%) and Canadians (62%), and more than half of Americans (54%) as useful. In 2011, Angus Reid Public Opinion said that half of Canadians (54%) and Americans (52%) found their sex education courses at school to be useful, but only 43% of Britons share the same view. And while more than half of Americans (57%) say conversations with family were useful, only 49% of Canadians and 35% of Britons said so. Young people's recommendations about the expansion of sexuality education programs are: To build a more critical assessment of pornography among young people (i.e., porn literacy). Sex Education should include reducing shame associated with viewing pornography, consent, relationship management, negotiation skills, and learning how to please yourself and your partner, body image, sexual expectations, and physical and psychological safety as it relates to pleasure and sexual functioning. To show pornography as a tool and projecting variants of possibilities, also the can and can nots, such as consensual and nonconsensual sex. Young people wanted adults to speak factually about sex. Participants in an Irish study discussed that timing of pornography education should begin with adolescents’ first access to the internet and be age-appropriate: “not going into the nitty-gritty or gory details, but just starting the conversation”.

== By area ==
=== Africa ===
Sex education in Africa has focused on stemming the growing AIDS epidemic. Most governments in the region have established AIDS education programs in partnership with the World Health Organization and international NGOs. These programs were undercut significantly by the Mexico City policy, an initiative put in place by President Ronald Reagan, suspended by President Bill Clinton, and reinstated by President George W. Bush. The Global Gag Rule "required nongovernmental organizations to agree as a condition of their receipt of Federal funds that such organizations would neither perform nor actively promote abortion as a method of family planning in other nations...." The policy was again suspended as one of the first official acts by United States President Barack Obama. New HIV infections in Uganda decreased dramatically when Clinton supported a comprehensive sexuality education approach (including information about contraception and abortion). According to Ugandan AIDS activists, the policy undermined community efforts to reduce HIV prevalence and HIV transmission.

Egypt teaches knowledge about male and female reproductive systems, sexual organs, contraception, and STDs in public schools at the second and third years of the middle-preparatory phase (when students are aged 12–14). A coordinated program between UNDP, UNICEF, and the ministries of health and education promotes sexual education at a larger scale in rural areas and spreads awareness of the dangers of female genital mutilation.

=== Asia ===
The state of sex education programs in Asia varies by country. The topic of sex education is considered to be controversial because it deals with different topics that are sometimes too vague and too broad to be used effectively in society.

==== Thailand ====
In Thailand, there has been progress on sex education, with the boundaries being pushed forward with each revision of the curriculum. The first national policy on sexuality education in schools was announced in 1938, but sex education was not taught in schools until 1978. It was then called "Life and Family Studies", and its content consisted of issues related to the reproductive system and personal hygiene. The education curriculum has been revised several times, involving efforts from both government and non-government sectors, and sex education has been accepted as a problem-solving tool for adolescent sexual reproduction and health issues. This has been a result of educational reform following the National Education Act B.E. 2542, increasing awareness of problems related to adolescents' sexual practices, and the emergence of women's sexuality and queer movements. Another new approach in sexuality education curricula in Thailand has been the Teenpath Project developed by PATH, Thailand. PATH has also succeeded in institutionalizing sexuality education curricula in schools since 2003.

==== India ====
Sex education in India remains a controversial subject due to conflicting religious, moral, and cultural beliefs regarding its place in adolescent and youth education. Sexual reproduction and different contraceptive methods are taught in grades 8, 10, and 12 (ages 13–17) compulsorily as a part of the biology course, and some urban schools do have seminars in the area of sex education. In 1993, the Adolescent Education Programme (AEP) was initiated by the Government of India, formalizing the need for sex education and later included in the National Curriculum Framework in 2005. However, there was no consensus among states to make it compulsory, and dedicated comprehensive sexuality education (CSE) has not been mandated in any national school curricula. Some states in India have also banned or refused to implement sex education in their states, citing conflict with traditional Indian values.

In India, there are multiple in- and out-of-school programs promoting sex education, including information on reproduction, sexuality, gender, contraception, STIs, violence, etc. One such example is the Rashtriya Kishor Swasthya Karyakram (RKSK), launched in 2014 by the Ministry of Health and Family Welfare to address adolescent health programming in the country, including sexual and reproductive health. Non-profit organizations and other groups in the development sector primarily lead the delivery of out-of-school CSE programs. These organizations and collectives also work closely with relevant government ministries and multilateral institutions (such as UNESCO and WHO) to engage in public advocacy and policy change to promote the acceptance and implementation of sex education.

The AIDS prevalence rate in India is lower than that of other countries, despite being home to the world's third-largest population of persons with HIV/AIDS (as of 2023, with South Africa and Nigeria having more). However, AIDS clinics are not universally available and accessible across different geographic regions in the country.

India has a strong prevention program which goes hand in hand with care, support and treatment. We have been able to contain the epidemic with a prevalence of just 0.31%. We have also brought about a decline of 50% in new infections annually.

— Shri Gulam Nabi Azad, Hon'ble Minister of Health and Family Welfare, 2011.

==== China ====
In 2000, the China Family Planning Association launched a new five-year project to "promote reproductive health education among Chinese teenagers and unmarried youth" in twelve urban districts and three counties. This included discussion about sex within human relationships as well as pregnancy and HIV prevention. Since the 2010s, there has been a great increase in books about sex education for children and young adults.

There is demand for sex education that is concentrated on social media platforms such as Weibo, citing the need to have sex education for its people to learn how to protect themselves against sexually related abuse and harassment. China currently still experiences sexual illiteracy. China's government passed a law mandating "age-appropriate sex education" in October 2020, but no guidelines have been issued yet to clarify how the mandate would be implemented in schools.

Most recently, China has introduced a new sexual education program for students named the 'Healthy China Initiatives (2019–2030)'. The initiative came after a 2015 study by the China Family Planning Association conducted a study that showed only 10% of approximately 20,000 universities reported that they were not content with their sexual education in grade school and were unknowledgeable to violence, gender, contraceptives, sexually transmitted diseases, and pregnancy among other topics. The initiative is said to help provide students with knowledge of gender, sexuality, equality, consent, and rights.

==== South Korea ====
In South Korea, sex education began in some schools in the 1960s and has been officially taught in public schools since 1984. A 2007 revision to the School Health Act made health education a mandatory subject in all grade schools, within which topics regarding gender equality, safe sex practices, and sexual ethics were included. Currently, all primary and secondary schools are required to include at least 15 hours of sex education in every school year, though 12 hours can be replaced with other subjects using each school's discretion.

According to a 2020 study, 81% of primary school students reported receiving sex education. Sex education was reportedly superficial and focused mostly on biological topics, such as bodily changes during puberty, the process of reproduction, the anatomy of the reproductive system, and menstruation. Contraception and prevention of sexual violence were also covered. Most of the participants in the study were unsatisfied with the current state of sex education and believed it was ineffective.

Sex education in schools has been subject to controversy and has drawn criticisms from both conservative and feminist groups. A standardized guideline on sex education published by the Ministry of Education in 2015 was later withdrawn after being criticized for "poor quality". Some Christian associations and parent groups have protested against in-depth sex education, specifically regarding reproductive rights and homosexuality. In one case, a demonstration on the correct use of a condom at a school was suspended due to complaints. The South Korean government has censored books regarding sex education due to pressure from conservative and parent groups. MBC reported that 67 out of 68 censored sex education books were "harmless", however.

Conservative and Christian groups in South Korea oppose comprehensive sexuality education (CSE), claiming it could encourage early sexualization(조기 성애화, jogi seongaehwa). However, there is no evidence to support their claims. In contrast to the United States, where teenage pregnancy has decreased due to the strengthening of sex education focused on contraception, the problem of teenage unwed mothers due to unintended pregnancies is serious in South Korea.

Also, sex education in South Korea does not teach about the existence of LGBT. This has been criticized internationally and by LGBT rights groups in South Korea.

Some South Korean parents, who want to educate their children about sex properly, rely on private education for sex education because of unsatisfactory sex education in schools.

==== Singapore ====
The Singapore Family Planning Association has developed a series of sex education programs for young people, focusing on strict control of sexual behavior and age. The Singapore government attaches great importance to the moral education of young people, and the sentencing of sexual offenses is strict.

==== Other countries ====
Indonesia and Mongolia have systematic policy frameworks for teaching about sex in schools. Malaysia and Thailand have assessed adolescent reproductive health needs to develop adolescent-specific training, messages, and materials.

Bangladesh, Myanmar, and Pakistan have no coordinated sex education programs.

In most Islamic countries, sex education is given after marriage to the couple.

In Nepal, sex education is mandatory in school.

In Japan, sex education is mandatory from age 10 or 11, mainly covering biological topics such as menstruation and ejaculation.

In Sri Lanka, sex education traditionally consisted of reading the reproduction section of biology textbooks. Young people are taught at age 12.

The International Planned Parenthood Federation and the BBC World Service ran a 12-part series known as Sexwise, which discussed sex education, family life education, contraception and parenting. It was first launched in South Asia and then extended worldwide.

In Taiwan, compared to China, sex education has been much more progressive. However, the controversy lies more in anti-gay groups who argue that including same-sex relationships in sex education is morally controversial, despite being the first Asian country to legalize same-sex marriage. Therefore, while sex education is required in school, LGBTQ topics have been rejected by multiple parents in society, which potentially violates gender equity education in From the Journal of Modern Education Review, Taiwan has committed to achieving gender equity since 2004 with its Gender Equity Education Act (Taiwan) (GEEA), which includes curriculum, material, and activities to be practiced and taught in elementary and middle school. But also as a relatively conservative Asian country and culture, Taiwan has not yet been up to par with international standards, but seemingly on its way towards more progressive sex education.

=== Europe ===
The World Health Organization and the German Federal Office of Health Education recommend sex education for children of all ages.

==== Finland ====
In Finland, sexual education is usually incorporated into various compulsory courses, mainly as part of biology lessons (in lower grades) and later in a course related to general health issues.

==== France ====
In France, sex education has been part of school curricula since 1973, though it is optional. Schools are expected to provide 30 to 40 hours of sex education and pass out condoms to students in grades 8 and 9 (aged 14). In January 2000, the French government launched an information campaign on contraception with TV and radio spots and the distribution of five million leaflets on contraception to high school students. In September 2013, the government launched a new program called les ABCD de l'égalité ('the ABCD of equality') whose main aim is to "fight gender stereotypes at school". The ultimate goal is to foster mutual respect between boys and girls early on so that it impacts their conception of the world later on.

==== Germany ====
The first state-sponsored courses on sex education were introduced in Breslau, Prussia, c. 1900 by Dr. Martin Chotzen.

In Germany, sex education has been part of school curricula since 1970. Since 1992, sex education has been a governmental duty by law.

It normally covers all subjects concerning the process of growing up, bodily changes during puberty, emotions involved, the biological process of reproduction, sexual activity, partnership, homosexuality, unwanted pregnancies, and the complications of abortion, the dangers of sexual violence, child abuse, and sexually transmitted diseases. It is comprehensive enough that it sometimes also includes things in its curricula, such as sex positions. Most schools offer courses on the correct usage of contraception.

A sex survey by the World Health Organization concerning the habits of European teenagers in 2006 revealed that German teenagers care about contraception. The birth rate among 15- to 19-year-olds was low—only 11.7 per 1,000 people, compared with 27.8 per 1,000 in the UK and 39.0 per 1,000 in Bulgaria (which, incidentally, has the highest birth rate in Europe).

German Constitutional Court and later, in 2011, the European Court of Human Rights, rejected complaints from several Baptists against Germany concerning mandatory sex education.

==== Greece ====
A 2022 analysis reported that human reproduction is mentioned in 6 of 113 Greek secondary education biology textbooks used from the 1870s to the present.

==== Poland ====
In the People's Republic of Poland, sex education has been one of the school subjects since 1973; however, it has been relatively poor and has not achieved any real success. Between 1989 and 2025, it was marginalised, having been called "family life education" (wychowanie do życia w rodzinie) rather than "sex education" (edukacja seksualna), and schools explicitly required parental consent for their children to attend sex education classes. This policy was largely due to the strong objection against sex education raised by the Catholic Church. However, since 2025, a new subject called "health education" (edukacja zdrowotna) has been introduced, which, at first, was voluntary as well. While "health education" has been made compulsory since 2026, the sexual part was detached from it and parental consent remains required there.

==== Portugal ====
Some sex education is taught as part of biology-related curricula. There is also an official program intended to provide sex education for students.

==== Netherlands ====
Subsidized by the Dutch government, the "Long Live Love" package (Lang leve de liefde), developed in the late 1980s, aims to equip teenagers with the skills to make their own decisions about health and sexuality. Nearly all secondary schools provide sex education as part of biology classes, and over half of primary schools discuss sexuality and contraception. Starting the 2012 school year, age-appropriate sex education—including education about sexual diversity—has been compulsory in all primary and secondary schools. The curriculum focuses on biological aspects of reproduction as well as on values, attitudes, communication, and negotiation skills. Dutch sex education encourages the idea that topics like masturbation, homosexuality, and sexual pleasure are normal or natural and that there are larger emotional, relational, and societal forces that shape the experiences of sexuality. This type of curriculum can begin for students as young as age four. The curriculum for children focuses on topics like love, self-image, and gender stereotypes. All elementary-level students in the Netherlands are required by law to receive some level of sex education. There is some flexibility in how the subject is taught; however, certain principles are required, such as sexual diversity and sexual assertiveness. Moreover, according to Amy Schalet, Dutch parents tend to form close relationships with their children, openly discussing teen sexuality. Dutch parents try to accept their children's romantic relationships and even allow sleepovers, expecting them to have sex. The media has encouraged open dialogue, and the health-care system guarantees confidentiality and a non-judgmental approach. The Netherlands has one of the lowest teenage pregnancy rates in the world, and the Dutch approach is often seen as a model for other countries.

==== Slovakia ====
In Slovakia, the content of sex education varies from school to school, most frequently as a segment of a larger lesson plan of a subject akin to nature science in English (this course covers both biology and petrology). Generally, the sex ed content taught in Slovakia is quite basic, sometimes lacking, though exactly what any given lesson covers varies among schools and depends on the teacher's knowledge of the subject. It is not uncommon for teachers to rely on students asking questions (rather than documentaries, discussions, textbooks, or in-class debates). Classes are usually divided into boys' and girls' classes. Boys are taught the basics of sex, usually limited to dialogue between student and teacher of annotated diagrams of genitalia; while girls are additionally taught about menstruation and pregnancy.

==== Sweden ====
In Sweden, sex education was established in 1921 for secondary education and in 1942 for all grades. The subject is usually started in kindergarten and continues cumulatively throughout the student's entire schooling. This sexual education is incorporated into different subjects such as biology and history. The Swedish Association for Sexuality Education (RFSU) has a sex education that emphasizes "sexual diversity, freedom and enjoyment", and the RFSU collaborate frequently with government organizations such as the National Institute of Public Health. Alongside this emphasis on sexual diversity, Swedish sex education has equal incorporations of lesbian and gay sexuality as well as heterosexual sexuality. They provide knowledge about masturbation, oral and anal sex, as well as heterosexual genital intercourse.

==== Switzerland ====
In Switzerland, the content and amount of sex education is decided at the cantonal level. In Geneva, courses have been offered at the secondary level for girls since 1926, and compulsory programs have been implemented for all classes since the 1950s. In most French-speaking cantons since the 1970s, generalized courses have been implemented by states with duly formed and trained specialists working within school health services at the secondary level.

Interventions in primary schools began in the 1980s, with the basic objective of empowering children, strengthening their resources, and giving them the capacity to distinguish right from wrong based on what is and is not allowed by law and society. They are also given knowledge of their rights, told that they can have their own feelings, and informed about whom to talk to if they feel uncomfortable about a private matter and wish to discuss it.

Finally, the objectives include enforcing their capacity to decide for themselves and their ability to express their feelings about a situation and to say "no". In secondary schools, there are programs for ages 13–14 and 16–17 with the basic objective of giving students a secure moment with caring, well-informed adults. With confidentiality and mutual respect, students can talk to an adult who understands youth needs and what they should know about sexual life in conformity with age and maturity.

In the German part of the country, the situation is somewhat different. Sex education as a school-implemented program is a fairly recent subject, with the responsibility given to school teachers. Though federal structures give authority to each state to decide, there are efforts, notably under the auspices of Santé sexuelle Suisse – the Swiss branch of IPPF (International Planned Parenthood Federation) – to look for and propose possible models of application which take into account all factors of sex education according to their different levels of concern, parents, teachers, and external experts.

==== United Kingdom ====
===== England and Wales =====
Cecil Reddie ran the first sex education course at a British school in October 1889 at Abbotsholme School, but the lessons were only for sex between married couples.

In England and Wales, Sex and Relationships Education (SRE) has been compulsory since 1976, in part, from age 11 onwards. It involves teaching children about reproduction, sexuality, and sexual health. It does not promote early sexual activity or any particular sexual orientation. The compulsory parts of sex and relationships education are the elements contained within the national curriculum for science. Parents can currently withdraw their children from all other parts of sex and relationships education if they want.

The compulsory curriculum focuses on the reproductive system, fetal development, and the physical and emotional changes of adolescence, while information about contraception and safe sex is discretionary and discussion about relationships is often neglected. Britain has one of the highest teenage pregnancy rates in Europe However, these have halved across England and Wales in recent years and continue to fall

Some schools actively choose to deliver age-appropriate relationship and sex education from Early Years Foundation Stage, which includes the differences between boys and girls, naming body parts, and what areas of the body are private and should not be touched unless the child is happy and gives consent.

Following sustained political pressure, in March 2017 it was announced by the Department for Education (DfE) that from September 2019, Relationship Education (RE) in primary schools and Relationship and Sex Education (RSE) in secondary schools would be made mandatory in England by the UK government. The existing category of SRE (Sex and Relationships Education) is now referred to as RSE (Relationship and Sex Education) by the British government.

Since September 2020, all primary age schoolchildren and up in England are taught Relationships and Health Education. Relationships education includes the follow topics: families and people who care for me; caring friendships; respectful relationships; online relationships; and being safe. By the end of primary school, pupils have also learned the following from their health education: mental wellbeing; internet safety and harms; physical health and fitness; healthy eating; facts and risks associated with drugs, alcohol, and tobacco; health and prevention; basic first aid; and the changing adolescent body. At secondary school, pupils' understanding of health is developed with an increased focus on areas like drugs, alcohol, intimate relationships, sex, and how to have positive and healthy sexual relationships.

Students cannot be withdrawn from Relationships Education, but their parents can withdraw them from the sexual health component of the curriculum if the headteacher grants the request. Schools must respect the parents' request to withdraw their child up to and until three terms before the child turns 16. If the child wishes to receive sex education after this point, the school is expected to make arrangements to offer it.

===== Scotland =====
The main sex education program in Scotland is Healthy Respect, which focuses not only on the biological aspects of reproduction but also on relationships and emotions. Education about contraception and sexually transmitted diseases is included in the program as a way of encouraging good sexual health. In response to a refusal by Catholic schools to commit to the program, however, a separate sex education program has been developed for use in those schools. Funded by the Scottish Government, the program Called to Love focuses on encouraging children to delay sex until marriage, and does not cover contraception, and as such is a form of abstinence-only sex education.

=== North America ===
==== Canada ====
As education is a provincial concern, sex education varies across Canada. Ontario has a provincial curriculum dating back to 1998. Attempting to update it has proven controversial: a first reform was shelved in 2010 and a new curriculum introduced in 2015 by the Liberal government under Kathleen Wynne was reversed three years later by the Conservatives under Doug Ford, inviting parents to file complaints against teachers who will not comply with the change. Mandatory sex education was removed from the Quebec provincial curriculum in 2005, leaving it at the discretion of each teacher. With rates of syphilis and gonorrhea rising in the province since this change, several researchers and sex educators are criticizing the current policy, most notably Lisa Trimble and Stephanie Mitelman. It was brought back as a facultative subject in 2016–2017, then mandatory for the 2017–2018 school year.

==== United States ====
Almost all U.S. public students receive some form of sex education at least once between grades 7 and 12; many public schools begin addressing some topics in grades 5 or 6. However, what students learn varies widely, because curriculum decisions are decentralized. Multiple states have laws governing what is taught in sex education classes and contain provisions to allow parents to opt out. Some state laws leave curriculum decisions to individual school districts.

In January 2022, a study found that a majority of US teens lack quality sexual education, a trend that has been worsening over the years. Instruction on waiting until marriage to have sex declined from 73% to 67% among females (P = 0.005) and from 70% to 58% in males (P < 0.001).

Sex education is required in 30 states, 28 of which also require HIV education. 9 more states require just HIV education. Only 18 states require the information taught to be medically accurate by law. 37 states allow parents to opt their kids out of their Sex Ed. 19 states require instruction that sexual activity should only occur in marriage, and 28 states require that abstinence be stressed. Contextually, 11 states must inclusively discuss sexual orientation, and 5 legally must emphasize heterosexuality or provide negative information about homosexuality. A total of 6 states require LGBTQ+-inclusive sex education to be taught in school. Only 9 states require the importance of consent in a sexual situation.

For example, a 1999 study by the Guttmacher Institute found that most U.S. sex education courses in grades 7 through 12 cover puberty, HIV, STIs, abstinence, implications of teenage pregnancy, and how to resist peer pressure. Other studied topics, such as methods of birth control and infection prevention, sexual orientation, sexual abuse, and factual and ethical information about abortion, varied more widely.

Within the last decade, the US federal government has encouraged abstinence-only education by steering over a billion dollars to such programs. Some 25 states now decline the funding so that they can continue to teach comprehensive sexuality education. Funding for one of the federal government's two main abstinence-only funding programs, Title V, was extended only until December 31, 2007; Congress debated whether to continue it past that date. In 2007, a study ordered by the U.S. Congress found that middle school students who took part in abstinence-only sex education programs were just as likely to have sex (and use contraception) in their teenage years as those who did not. Abstinence-only advocates claimed that the study was flawed because it was too narrow and began when abstinence-only curricula were in their infancy, and that other studies have demonstrated positive effects.

Proponents of comprehensive sexuality education, which include the American Psychological Association, the American Medical Association, the National Association of School Psychologists, the American Academy of Pediatrics, the American Public Health Association, and the American College Health Association, argue that sexual behavior after puberty is a given, and it is therefore crucial to provide information about the risks and how they can be minimized; they also claim that denying teens such factual information leads to STIs and unwanted pregnancies.

A 2007 Centers for Disease Control and Prevention report showed a 3% increase in teenage pregnancies from 2005 to 2006, to nearly 42 births per 1,000. Apart from this, the rate of teen pregnancy has been declining consistently since 1991. Still, the U.S. has the highest teen birth rate and one of the highest rates of STIs among teens in the industrialized world.

=== Oceania ===
==== Australia ====
The Government of Victoria (Australia) developed a policy to promote Health and Human Relations Education in schools in 1980, which was introduced into the State's primary and secondary schools in 1981. The initiative was developed and implemented by the Honorable Norman Lacy MP, Minister for Educational Services from 1979 to 1982.

A Consultative Council for Health and Human Relations Education was established in December 1980 under the chairmanship of Dame Margaret Blackwood; its members possessed considerable expertise in the area.

The council had three major functions:

1. to advise and to be consulted on all aspects of Health and Human Relations' Education in schools;
2. to develop, for consideration of the Government, an appropriate curriculum for schools;
3. to advise and recommend the standards for in-service courses for teachers and relevant members of the school community.

Support services for the Consultative Council were provided by a new Health and Human Relations Unit within the Special Services Division of the Education Department of Victoria, which was responsible for implementing the Government's policy and guidelines in this area. The Unit advised principals, school councils, teachers, parents, tertiary institutions, and others on all aspects of Health and Human Relations Education.

In 1981, the Consultative Council recommended adopting a set of guidelines for the provision of Health and Human Relations Education in schools, as well as a Curriculum Statement to assist schools in developing their programs. These were presented to the Victorian Cabinet in December 1981 and adopted as government policy.

As of March 2021, a program called "Respectful Relationships" was a core part of Victoria's curriculum and was to become mandatory in all state schools. Students will also be specifically taught about consent.

==== New Zealand ====
In New Zealand, sexuality education is part of the Health and Physical Education curriculum, which is compulsory for the first 10 years of schooling (Years 1 to 10) but optional thereafter. Sexual and reproductive health education begins at Year 7 (approximately age 11), although broader issues such as physical, emotional and social development, personal and interpersonal skills, and (non-sexual) relationships begin as early as Year 1 (approximately age 5).

The Health/Hauora curriculum, including the sexuality education component, is the only part of the New Zealand Curriculum/Te Matauranga o Aotearoa (the former for English-medium schools, the latter for Māori-medium schools) in which state and state-integrated schools must legally consult with the school community regarding its delivery, and the consultations must occur at least once every two years. Parents can ask for their children to be removed from the sexuality education component of the health curriculum for any reason, provided they apply in writing to the school principal, and do so at least 24 hours beforehand so alternative arrangements can be made. However, this does not prevent a teacher answering sexuality education questions if a student, excluded or not, asks them.

== Opposing sides regarding the ethics of sexuality ==
There are two opposing sides of the sex education argument among parents. Sexual liberals see knowledge about sex as equipping individuals to make informed decisions about their personal sexuality and tend to favor comprehensive sexual education throughout schooling, not just in high school. Sexual conservatives, by contrast, believe that extensive education on sex encourages adolescents to have sex and argue that sex education should be taught within the family so that moral values can be included in the conversation. They generally support sex education only through abstinence-only programs.

Some claim that certain sex education curricula break down pre-existing notions of modesty or encourage acceptance of what they consider immoral practices, such as homosexuality or premarital sex. Naturally, those who believe that homosexuality and premarital sex are a normal part of the range of human sexuality disagree with them.

Multiple religions teach that sexual behavior outside of marriage is immoral and/or psychologically damaging, and some adherents desire this morality to be taught as a part of sex education. They may believe that sexual knowledge is necessary, or simply unavoidable, hence their preference for curricula based on abstinence.

== Sexual health website evaluation studies ==
Research conducted in the 2010–20 shows the effectiveness of digital sexual health interventions for young adults. The systematic literature review examined 9881 records and assessed 61 studies, showing that phones are the leading means of delivering cognitive and behavioral outcomes related to sexual health. Tools identified as the most popular mechanisms for sexual health promotion were: interactive websites, text messaging, phone calls, and online education programs. In evaluating the impact of these interventions, the review highlighted the importance of robust research designs, such as randomized controlled trials.

The reliability of the information on Sexual Health remains a concern. A study focusing on websites that adolescents tend to access when seeking online sexual health information revealed the differences in reliability of those online resources. The study focused on websites based in the US, such as Planned Parenthood and WebMD. While Planned Parenthood was found to be the most well-rounded website, concerns about the reliability of some websites remain.

Another study focused on the quality of online sexual health resources accessed by young people. It found that the CDC had the highest reliability score, while Planned Parenthood and WebMD had higher usability scores.

Both these studies highlight the importance of online resources promoting sexual health in being easily accessible and trustworthy.

A study examined the accessibility of sex education content online. The research involved a keyword search, which identified 41 relevant web pages. A surprising finding was that 63% of the pages were classified as pornography. This study highlights the difficulties and challenges that surround sexual health website evaluation studies.

== LGBT sex education ==
One major source of controversy in the realm of sex education is whether LGBT sex education should be integrated into school curricula. LGBT sex education includes inclusive teaching of safe sex practices for lesbian, gay, bisexual, and transgender individuals and general instruction in topics related to sexual orientation and gender identity. Studies have shown that many schools do not offer such education today. Five states (Alabama, Louisiana, Mississippi, Oklahoma, and Texas) have laws in place that ban teaching LGBT sex education. Only 20% of LGBT students have heard anything positive about their community, and they reported in a 2011 Gay, Lesbian and Straight Education Network (GLSEN) report that they were more likely to hear positive information about LGBT people from a history or social studies class rather than a health class. Six states (California, Colorado, New Jersey, Oregon, Rhode Island, and Washington) enforce sex education curricula that includes LGBT information beginning 2020. Beyond states, the District of Columbia has also moved to offer curricula that support LGBT sexual education. Beneficial factors have been shown to include lowered rates of depression and suicide, tentative approaches to sexual behaviors, and intimidation from peers.

=== Pro-LGBT ===
Proponents of LGBT sex education argue that encompassing homosexuality into the curricula would provide LGBT students with the sexual health information they need, and help to ameliorate problems such as low self-esteem and depression that research has shown can be present in LGBT individuals. They also claim that it could reduce homophobic bullying.

An example of an LGBT-inclusive curriculum is outlined in the National Sexuality Education Standards set forth by the Future of Sex Education Initiative. These educational standards outline seven core topics that must be addressed in sex education; one of them is identity. The identity topic presents lesbian, gay, bisexual, and transgender identities as possibilities for students as they progress through life and come to understand who they are. These standards, the Future of Sex Education argues, will start in kindergarten and will evolve into more complex topics throughout schooling as the students mature and age. In the UK, BigTalk Education's Growing Up Safe program, which includes LGBT relationship education from Primary School age, was awarded the 2017 Pamela Sheridan award for innovation and good practice in relationships and sex education (RSE), services and projects for young people.

=== Anti-LGBT ===
Opponents often argue that teaching LGBT sex education would be disrespectful to some religions and expose students to inappropriate topics. They say that including homosexuality in the curriculum would violate parents' rights to control what their children are exposed to and that schools should not inflict a particular political view on students. Currently, multiple sex education curricula do not include LGBT topics, and research has reported that students often feel that they do not receive adequate instruction in LGBT sex topics.

=== Parental rights in education ===
Recently, some states have opted to restrict topics about LGBT matters and people. One of the most controversial laws passed has been labeled the "Don't Say Gay" law, which has most recently been passed in Florida. The bill seeks to ban gender and sexuality issues being presented to students while in lower grade school in efforts to allow parents to decide as to when or if they will introduce their child to Gender and Sexuality subject matter.

== See also ==
- The ABC of Sex Education for Trainables, a short film informing people about the need to educate the mentally disabled ("trainables") about sex
- About Your Sexuality
- Adolescent sexuality
- Age of consent
- AIDS Education and Training Centers (AETCs) in the US
- Harmful to Minors, a book by Judith Levine, which deals with sexual morality and sex education in the United States
- Julio and Marisol
- List of universities with BDSM clubs
- Section 28 (UK)
- World War II U.S. Military Sex Education
