= Icelandic Evangelical Lutheran Synod of America =

Defunct Christian denomination in the United States

- Abbreviation: Icelandic Synod
- Classification: Lutheran
- Region: Canada; United States
- Origin: June 1885; Winnipeg, Manitoba, Canada
- Merged into: United Lutheran Church in America (1942)
- Defunct: 1962
- Congregations: 12 (1951)
- Members: 1,568 (1951)
- Ministers: 4 (1951)
- Publications: Sameiningin

The Icelandic Evangelical Lutheran Synod of America was a Lutheran church body in North America.

The synod was founded in June 1885 at a constitutional convention in Winnipeg, Manitoba. The early churches in this body were located in Manitoba and North Dakota. Later churches could be found in Minnesota and Washington in the United States and in Alberta, British Columbia, and Saskatchewan in Canada.

In 1910, the synod trained Steingrímur Octavius Thorlakson, a teacher from Manitoba, to serve as a missionary in Japan. Thorlakson arrived in Japan with his wife, Carolina Kristin Thorlakson, in 1916, and left in 1941 due to the Pacific War.

The synod was never a large synod. It had trouble reaching out to the small number of Icelandic immigrants spread across North America. In 1916, the synod had 49 congregations and 6,176 members in total.

The synod joined the United Lutheran Church in America in 1942, remaining as a separate synod in that denomination. When the United Lutheran Church in America became part of the Lutheran Church in America, the Icelandic Synod was dissolved and the member churches were placed in geographical synods.

In 1951, the Icelandic Synod had 4 pastors, 12 congregations, and 1,568 members.

In 1962, the United Lutheran Church in America became part of the new Lutheran Church in America. On January 1, 1988, the Lutheran Church in America ceased to exist when it, along with the American Lutheran Church and the Association of Evangelical Lutheran Churches, joined to form the Evangelical Lutheran Church in America, today the largest Lutheran church body in the United States.

== Presidents of the synod ==
- 1885–1908: Jon Bjarnason
- 1908–1921: Bjorn B. Jonsson
- 1921–1923: N. S. Thorlaksson
- 1923–1942: Kristinn K. Olafson
