= 1936 United States presidential election in Minnesota =

- November 3, 1936

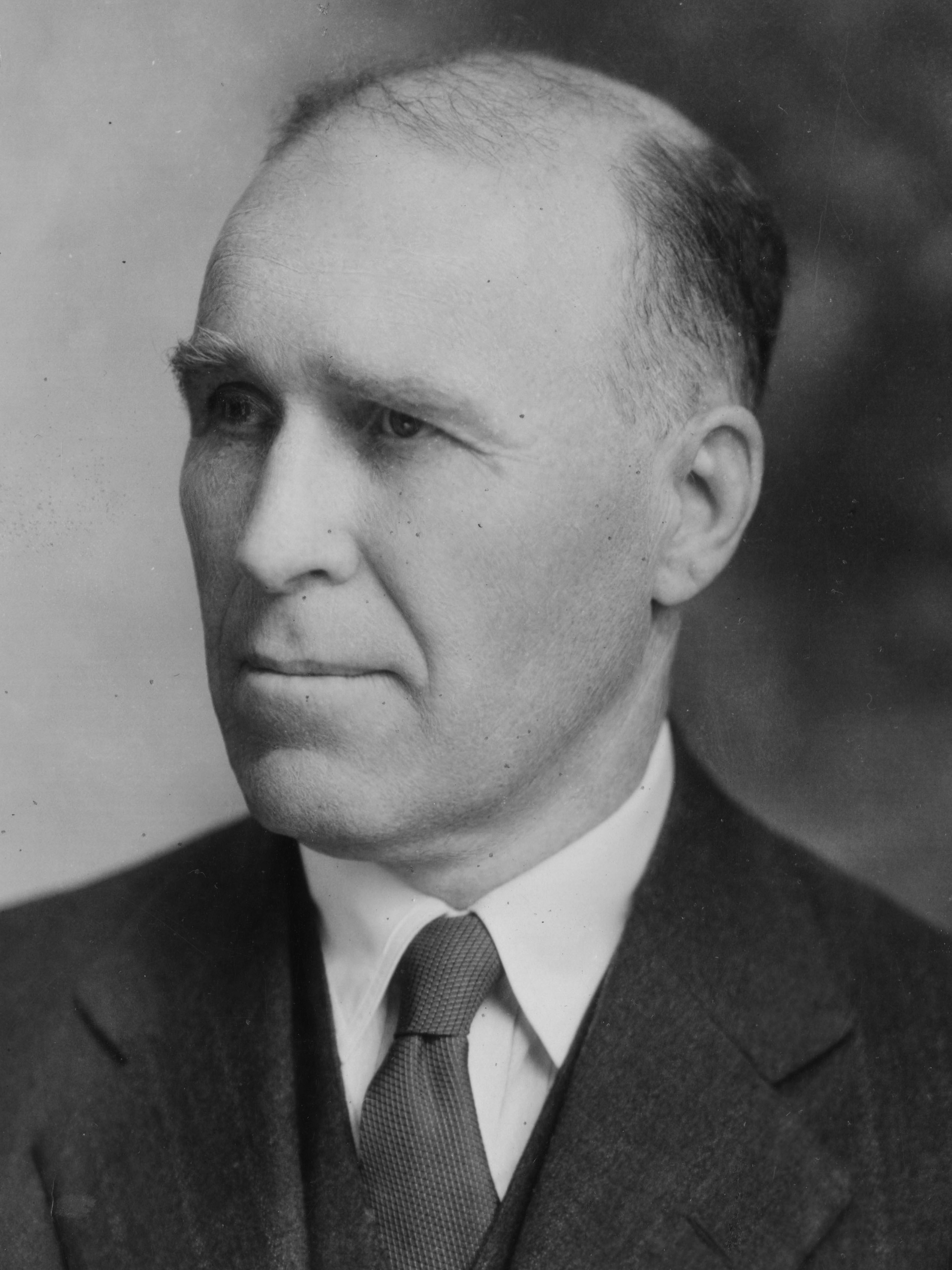
Nominee	Franklin D. Roosevelt	Alf Landon	William Lemke
Party	Democratic	Republican	Union
Alliance	Farmer–Labor
Home state	New York	Kansas	North Dakota
Running mate	John Nance Garner	Frank Knox	Thomas C. O'Brien
Electoral vote	11	0	0
Popular vote	698,811	350,461	74,296
Percentage	61.84%	31.01%	6.58%
County results
Roosevelt
40–50%
50–60%
60–70%
70–80%
80–90%
Landon
40–50%
President before election
Franklin D. Roosevelt
Democratic
Elected President
Franklin D. Roosevelt
Democratic

The 1936 United States presidential election in Minnesota took place on November 3, 1936, as part of the 1936 United States presidential election. Voters chose 11 electors, or representatives to the Electoral College, who voted for president and vice president.

Minnesota was won by the Democratic candidate, incumbent President Franklin D. Roosevelt won the state over Kansas governor Alf Landon by a margin of 348,350 votes, or 30.83%—nearly doubling Landon's overall share of the state's vote. Nationally, Roosevelt was soundly re-elected, with 523 electoral votes and a landslide 24.26% lead over Landon in the popular vote. Landon carried only two states: Maine and Vermont, whilst in Minnesota Landon won just three counties: Otter Tail County in the rural west, Carver County outside the Twin Cities, and Fillmore County in the southeast of the state; of these, only Fillmore has ever voted Democratic in a presidential election since.

Only five presidential nominees have ever won a greater percentage of the vote in Minnesota than Roosevelt did in 1936: Theodore Roosevelt in 1904 (74%), Warren G. Harding in 1920 (70.6%), Lyndon B. Johnson in 1964 (63.8%), Abraham Lincoln in 1860 (63.5%), and James A. Garfield in 1880 (62.3%)—every one of them going on to win the election nationally. As of the 2024 election, this is the last election in which either major party candidate exceeded 80% of the vote in any Minnesota county, with Roosevelt doing so in Lake County (ironically, the only county in the state that Roosevelt did not win in 1932, due to a strong showing by Socialist Norman Thomas).

Roosevelt's 30.8% margin of victory over Landon remains the widest margin by which any Democrat has ever carried Minnesota in a presidential election.

== Results ==
1936 United States presidential election in Minnesota
Party	Candidate	Votes	Percentage	Electoral votes
Democratic	Franklin D. Roosevelt (incumbent)	698,811	61.84%	11
Republican	Alf Landon	350,461	31.01%	0
Union	William Lemke	74,296	6.58%	0
Socialist	Norman Thomas	2,872	0.25%	0
Communist	Earl Browder	2,574	0.23%	0
Socialist Labor	John W. Aiken	961	0.09%	0
Totals		1,129,975	100.00%	11

=== Results by county ===
County	Franklin Delano Roosevelt Democratic		Alfred Mossman Landon Republican		William Frederick Lemke Union		Various candidates Other parties		Margin		Total votes cast
County	#	%	#	%	#	%	#	%	#	%	Total votes cast
Aitkin	3,806	57.57%	2,466	37.30%	229	3.46%	110	1.66%	1,340	20.27%	6,611
Anoka	4,501	56.91%	2,586	32.70%	788	9.96%	34	0.43%	1,915	24.21%	7,909
Becker	6,473	68.38%	2,683	28.34%	249	2.63%	61	0.64%	3,790	40.04%	9,466
Beltrami	6,507	72.65%	2,182	24.36%	157	1.75%	111	1.24%	4,325	48.29%	8,957
Benton	3,111	53.52%	1,783	30.67%	905	15.57%	14	0.24%	1,328	22.85%	5,813
Big Stone	2,648	66.22%	1,116	27.91%	221	5.53%	14	0.35%	1,532	38.31%	3,999
Blue Earth	8,255	55.89%	5,550	37.58%	921	6.24%	43	0.29%	2,705	18.32%	14,769
Brown	6,637	64.64%	2,679	26.09%	899	8.76%	52	0.51%	3,958	38.55%	10,267
Carlton	7,136	75.29%	2,163	22.82%	81	0.85%	98	1.03%	4,973	52.47%	9,478
Carver	2,814	38.59%	3,095	42.44%	1,366	18.73%	17	0.23%	-281	-3.85%	7,292
Cass	4,440	60.54%	2,634	35.91%	229	3.12%	31	0.42%	1,806	24.63%	7,334
Chippewa	4,027	61.40%	2,223	33.89%	268	4.09%	41	0.63%	1,804	27.50%	6,559
Chisago	3,360	55.26%	2,462	40.49%	229	3.77%	29	0.48%	898	14.77%	6,080
Clay	6,282	65.29%	2,880	29.93%	416	4.32%	43	0.45%	3,402	35.36%	9,621
Clearwater	3,208	75.34%	939	22.05%	92	2.16%	19	0.45%	2,269	53.29%	4,258
Cook	793	65.86%	387	32.14%	18	1.50%	6	0.50%	406	33.72%	1,204
Cottonwood	3,929	59.32%	2,509	37.88%	171	2.58%	14	0.21%	1,420	21.44%	6,623
Crow Wing	6,561	61.47%	3,611	33.83%	431	4.04%	70	0.66%	2,950	27.64%	10,673
Dakota	8,890	57.73%	4,043	26.26%	2,407	15.63%	58	0.38%	4,847	31.48%	15,398
Dodge	2,812	54.73%	2,138	41.61%	176	3.43%	12	0.23%	674	13.12%	5,138
Douglas	4,186	56.84%	2,681	36.41%	474	6.44%	23	0.31%	1,505	20.44%	7,364
Faribault	5,603	56.90%	3,773	38.32%	451	4.58%	20	0.20%	1,830	18.58%	9,847
Fillmore	4,764	45.79%	5,054	48.58%	559	5.37%	27	0.26%	-290	-2.79%	10,404
Freeborn	7,378	59.96%	4,653	37.81%	245	1.99%	29	0.24%	2,725	22.15%	12,305
Goodhue	8,257	57.50%	5,682	39.57%	364	2.53%	58	0.40%	2,575	17.93%	14,361
Grant	2,358	57.87%	1,566	38.43%	121	2.97%	30	0.74%	792	19.44%	4,075
Hennepin	144,289	58.78%	81,206	33.08%	18,468	7.52%	1,517	0.62%	63,083	25.70%	245,480
Houston	3,156	51.74%	2,701	44.28%	221	3.62%	22	0.36%	455	7.46%	6,100
Hubbard	2,312	56.92%	1,618	39.83%	106	2.61%	26	0.64%	694	17.09%	4,062
Isanti	3,442	67.19%	1,437	28.05%	201	3.92%	43	0.84%	2,005	39.14%	5,123
Itasca	8,896	69.41%	3,592	28.03%	190	1.48%	139	1.08%	5,304	41.38%	12,817
Jackson	5,187	72.09%	1,676	23.29%	311	4.32%	21	0.29%	3,511	48.80%	7,195
Kanabec	2,579	63.09%	1,350	33.02%	133	3.25%	26	0.64%	1,229	30.06%	4,088
Kandiyohi	6,595	69.25%	2,500	26.25%	352	3.70%	77	0.81%	4,095	43.00%	9,524
Kittson	3,127	73.25%	1,080	25.30%	31	0.73%	31	0.73%	2,047	47.95%	4,269
Koochiching	5,065	77.77%	1,316	20.21%	84	1.29%	48	0.74%	3,749	57.56%	6,513
Lac qui Parle	3,243	54.09%	2,066	34.46%	679	11.32%	8	0.13%	1,177	19.63%	5,996
Lake	2,717	80.15%	617	18.20%	30	0.88%	26	0.77%	2,100	61.95%	3,390
Lake of the Woods	1,566	76.32%	385	18.76%	73	3.56%	28	1.36%	1,181	57.55%	2,052
Le Sueur	5,077	57.27%	2,849	32.14%	920	10.38%	19	0.21%	2,228	25.13%	8,865
Lincoln	2,662	61.42%	1,199	27.66%	448	10.34%	25	0.58%	1,463	33.76%	4,334
Lyon	5,163	61.29%	2,551	30.28%	695	8.25%	15	0.18%	2,612	31.01%	8,424
McLeod	4,449	55.21%	2,941	36.50%	635	7.88%	33	0.41%	1,508	18.71%	8,058
Mahnomen	2,025	76.88%	474	18.00%	120	4.56%	15	0.57%	1,551	58.88%	2,634
Marshall	4,802	70.08%	1,904	27.79%	116	1.69%	30	0.44%	2,898	42.29%	6,852
Martin	6,492	66.08%	3,090	31.45%	215	2.19%	28	0.28%	3,402	34.63%	9,825
Meeker	4,242	56.25%	2,479	32.87%	797	10.57%	24	0.32%	1,763	23.38%	7,542
Mille Lacs	3,767	60.56%	2,091	33.62%	333	5.35%	29	0.47%	1,676	26.95%	6,220
Morrison	6,112	62.06%	2,682	27.23%	1,022	10.38%	32	0.32%	3,430	34.83%	9,848
Mower	8,228	61.01%	4,743	35.17%	467	3.46%	49	0.36%	3,485	25.84%	13,487
Murray	3,926	67.05%	1,601	27.34%	316	5.40%	12	0.20%	2,325	39.71%	5,855
Nicollet	4,136	59.06%	2,360	33.70%	488	6.97%	19	0.27%	1,776	25.36%	7,003
Nobles	4,919	60.94%	2,601	32.22%	531	6.58%	21	0.26%	2,318	28.72%	8,072
Norman	3,778	68.67%	1,570	28.54%	89	1.62%	65	1.18%	2,208	40.13%	5,502
Olmsted	8,958	60.04%	5,316	35.63%	583	3.91%	62	0.42%	3,642	24.41%	14,919
Otter Tail	8,642	47.72%	8,899	49.14%	438	2.42%	131	0.72%	-257	-1.42%	18,110
Pennington	3,736	72.47%	1,258	24.40%	100	1.94%	61	1.18%	2,478	48.07%	5,155
Pine	5,797	67.11%	2,452	28.39%	309	3.58%	80	0.93%	3,345	38.72%	8,638
Pipestone	3,026	58.53%	1,881	36.38%	250	4.84%	13	0.25%	1,145	22.15%	5,170
Polk	11,337	73.44%	3,751	24.30%	245	1.59%	104	0.67%	7,586	49.14%	15,437
Pope	3,200	61.05%	1,869	35.65%	159	3.03%	14	0.27%	1,331	25.39%	5,242
Ramsey	86,286	66.00%	30,553	23.37%	13,200	10.10%	689	0.53%	55,733	42.63%	130,728
Red Lake	2,057	77.53%	487	18.36%	89	3.35%	20	0.75%	1,570	59.18%	2,653
Redwood	4,965	55.34%	3,286	36.63%	691	7.70%	30	0.33%	1,679	18.71%	8,972
Renville	5,344	56.53%	3,049	32.25%	1,021	10.80%	39	0.41%	2,295	24.28%	9,453
Rice	5,928	48.09%	4,888	39.65%	1,473	11.95%	38	0.31%	1,040	8.44%	12,327
Rock	2,910	60.15%	1,752	36.21%	163	3.37%	13	0.27%	1,158	23.94%	4,838
Roseau	3,761	71.42%	1,326	25.18%	124	2.35%	55	1.04%	2,435	46.24%	5,266
Saint Louis	69,365	74.18%	22,332	23.88%	709	0.76%	1,104	1.18%	47,033	50.30%	93,510
Scott	3,861	58.87%	1,528	23.30%	1,153	17.58%	17	0.26%	2,333	35.57%	6,559
Sherburne	1,881	50.33%	1,623	43.43%	223	5.97%	10	0.27%	258	6.90%	3,737
Sibley	4,140	61.47%	2,184	32.43%	388	5.76%	23	0.34%	1,956	29.04%	6,735
Stearns	12,760	56.51%	5,262	23.30%	4,485	19.86%	73	0.32%	7,498	33.21%	22,580
Steele	4,481	54.49%	3,373	41.01%	362	4.40%	8	0.10%	1,108	13.47%	8,224
Stevens	2,352	59.42%	1,431	36.15%	167	4.22%	8	0.20%	921	23.27%	3,958
Swift	3,749	62.63%	1,618	27.03%	610	10.19%	9	0.15%	2,131	35.60%	5,986
Todd	5,627	56.26%	3,780	37.79%	575	5.75%	20	0.20%	1,847	18.47%	10,002
Traverse	2,297	73.06%	761	24.20%	82	2.61%	4	0.13%	1,536	48.85%	3,144
Wabasha	4,122	53.55%	2,663	34.60%	893	11.60%	19	0.25%	1,459	18.96%	7,697
Wadena	2,605	56.03%	1,898	40.83%	117	2.52%	29	0.62%	707	15.21%	4,649
Waseca	3,520	55.45%	2,482	39.10%	330	5.20%	16	0.25%	1,038	16.35%	6,348
Washington	6,768	57.80%	3,863	32.99%	1,030	8.80%	49	0.42%	2,905	24.81%	11,710
Watonwan	3,668	63.55%	1,930	33.44%	160	2.77%	14	0.24%	1,738	30.11%	5,772
Wilkin	2,428	61.66%	1,278	32.45%	220	5.59%	12	0.30%	1,150	29.20%	3,938
Winona	9,268	59.60%	5,353	34.42%	850	5.47%	80	0.51%	3,915	25.18%	15,551
Wright	5,363	47.25%	4,087	36.01%	1,842	16.23%	59	0.52%	1,276	11.24%	11,351
Yellow Medicine	3,921	58.71%	2,029	30.38%	717	10.74%	12	0.18%	1,892	28.33%	6,679
Totals	698,811	61.84%	350,459	31.01%	74,296	6.58%	6,407	0.57%	348,352	30.83%	1,129,973

==== Counties that flipped from Democratic to Republican ====
- Carver
- Fillmore
- Otter Tail

==== Counties that flipped from Republican to Democratic ====
- Lake

== See also ==
- United States presidential elections in Minnesota
