= Clearwater River (Red Lake River tributary) =

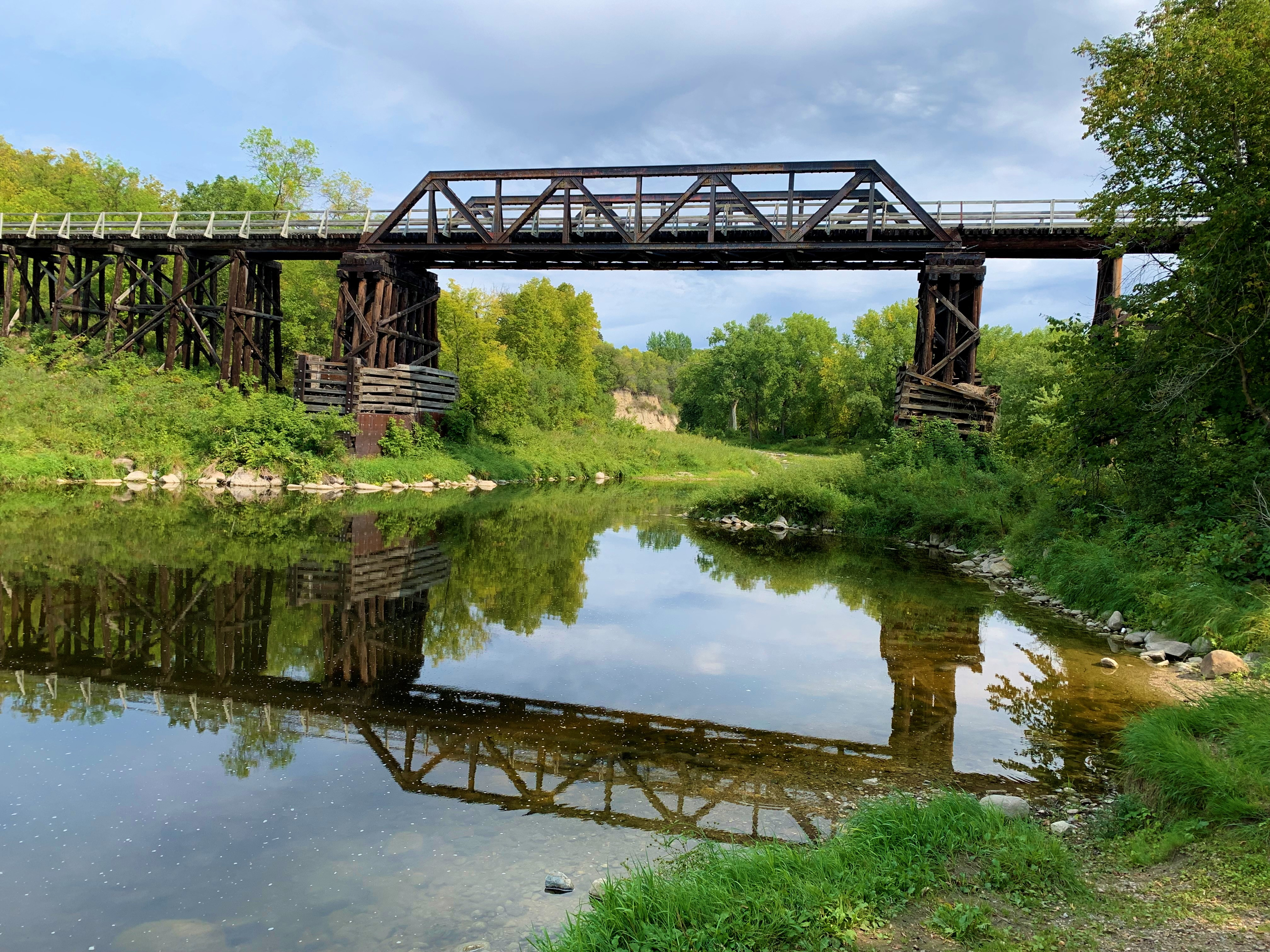

- Mouth of the Clearwater River

Location
- Country: United States
- State: Minnesota
- Region: Red River Valley
- Cities: Bagley, Minnesota, Plummer, Minnesota, Red Lake Falls, Minnesota

Physical characteristics
- Source
  - location: Western Clearwater County, Minnesota
  - coordinates: 47.4805135°N 95.5689108°W
  - elevation: 1,440 ft (440 m)
- Mouth: Red Lake River
  - location: Red Lake Falls, Minnesota
  - coordinates: 47.8938569°N 96.2828256°W
  - elevation: 955 ft (291 m)
- Basin size: 1,385 sq mi (3,590 km^{2})

Basin features
- River system: Nelson River basin
- Tributaries
  - left: Ruffy Brook, Lost River, Terrebonne Creek, Beau Gerlot Creek, Lower Badger Creek
  - right: Walker Brook, Butcher Knife Creek

The Clearwater River is a 147-mile-long (237 km) tributary of the Red Lake River of Minnesota in the United States. Via the Red Lake River, the Red River of the North, Lake Winnipeg, and the Nelson River, it is part of the Hudson Bay watershed.

"Clearwater" is an English translation of the native Ojibwe language name.

== See also ==
- List of rivers of Minnesota
- List of longest streams of Minnesota
