= River Township, Red Lake County, Minnesota =

River Township, Minnesota
- Township
- Location of River Township, within Red Lake County, Minnesota
- Coordinates: 47°56′41″N 96°9′55″W
- Country: United States
- State: Minnesota
- County: Red Lake

Area
  - Total: 11.7 sq mi (30.4 km^{2})
  - Land: 11.7 sq mi (30.4 km^{2})
  - Water: 0 sq mi (0.0 km^{2})
- Elevation: 1,096 ft (334 m)

Population (2020)
  - Total: 62
  - Density: 5.3/sq mi (2.0/km^{2})
- Time zone: UTC-6 (Central (CST))
  - Summer (DST): UTC-5 (CDT)
- FIPS code: 27-54538
- GNIS feature ID: 0665423

River Township is a township in Red Lake County, Minnesota, United States. The population was 62 at the 2020 census.

River Marius was named after the Red Lake River.

== Geography ==
According to the United States Census Bureau, the township has a total area of 11.8 square miles (30.5 km^{2}), all land.

== Demographics ==
As of the census of 2000, there were 65 people, 25 households, and 17 families residing in the township. The population density was 5.5 people per square mile (2.1/km^{2}). There were 28 housing units at an average density of 2.4/sq mi (0.9/km^{2}). The racial makeup of the township was 95.38% White, and 4.62% from two or more races.

There were 25 households, out of which 44.0% had children under the age of 18 living with them, 64.0% were married couples living together, 4.0% had a female householder with no husband present, and 32.0% were non-families. 28.0% of all households were made up of individuals, and 16.0% had someone living alone who was 65 years of age or older. The average household size was 2.60 and the average family size was 3.29.

In the township the population was spread out, with 35.4% under the age of 18, 32.3% from 25 to 44, 24.6% from 45 to 64, and 7.7% who were 65 years of age or older. The median age was 38 years. For every 100 females, there were 103.1 males. For every 100 females age 18 and over, there were 110.0 males.

The median income for a household in the township was $41,250, and the median income for a family was $42,083. Males had a median income of $31,875 versus $20,417 for females. The per capita income for the township was $12,335. There were 9.5% of families and 11.1% of the population living below the poverty line, including 11.4% of under eighteens and none of those over 64.
