= 2000 United States presidential election in Minnesota =

- November 7, 2000
- Turnout: 70.11% (▲3.5 pp)

Nominee	Al Gore	George W. Bush	Ralph Nader
Party	Democratic (DFL)	Republican	Green
Home state	Tennessee	Texas	Connecticut
Running mate	Joe Lieberman	Dick Cheney	Winona LaDuke
Electoral vote	10	0	0
Popular vote	1,168,266	1,109,659	126,696
Percentage	47.91%	45.50%	5.20%

Gore
40–50%
50–60%
60–70%
70–80%
80–90%
90–100%
Bush
30–40%
40–50%
50–60%
60–70%
70–80%
80–90%
90–100%
Tie/no data
President before election
Bill Clinton
Democratic (DFL)
Elected President
George W. Bush
Republican

The 2000 United States presidential election in Minnesota took place on November 7, 2000, as part of the 2000 United States presidential election, which was held throughout all 50 states and D.C. Voters chose ten representatives, or electors, to the Electoral College, who voted for president and vice president.

Minnesota was won by Vice President Al Gore by a 2.39% margin of victory, a much weaker performance than President Bill Clinton had in 1996, when he carried the state with 51% of the vote and a 16% margin of victory. Despite winning the state, Gore lost most of the counties and congressional districts in the state. However, Gore won highly populated counties such as Hennepin County, Ramsey County, and St. Louis County by safe margins. In terms of congressional districts, Gore won three districts including the urban 4th and 5th and won the 8th district with less than fifty percent of the vote. Bush overall dominated the rural areas, located in the western and southern parts of the state, and became the first Republican presidential nominee to win Red Lake County since Warren G. Harding in 1920. Nonetheless, he became the first ever Republican to win the White House without carrying Fillmore County. No Republican has won the state since Richard Nixon in 1972, a Democratic streak longer than any other state.

Gore carried the state by a fairly close margin, largely on the strength of his performance in the Twin Cities metro. As of the 2024 presidential election, this is the last election in which Cook County voted for a Republican presidential candidate.

== General election ==
=== Polling ===
Poll source	Date(s)	Sample size	Margin of error	George W. Bush (R)	Al Gore (D)	Ralph Nader (G)	Other / undecided (Note: Calculated by taking the difference of 100% and all other candidates combined.)
Harris Insights & Analytics	November 3, 2000	3,796	—	43%	46%	8%	3%
Minneapolis Star Tribune	November 2, 2000	1,015	—	37%	47%	8%	8%
Mason-Dixon Polling & Strategy	October 27, 2000	625	—	41%	44%	8%	7%
St. Cloud State University	October 19, 2000	514	—	41%	38%	10%	11%

=== Results ===
2000 United States presidential election in Minnesota
Party	Candidate	Running mate	Votes	Percentage	Electoral votes
Democratic (DFL)	Al Gore	Joe Lieberman	1,168,266	47.91%	10
Republican	George W. Bush	Dick Cheney	1,109,659	45.50%	0
Green	Ralph Nader	Winona LaDuke	126,696	5.20%	0
Reform	Pat Buchanan	Ezola Foster	22,166	0.91%	0
Libertarian	Harry Browne	Art Olivier	5,282	0.22%	0
Constitution	Howard Phillips	J. Curtis Frazier	3,272	0.13%	0
Natural Law	John Hagelin	A. Nat. Goldhaber	2,294	0.09%	0
Socialist Workers	James Harris	Margaret Trowe	1,022	0.04%	0
Write Ins			28	0.00%	0
Totals			2,438,685	100.00%	10
Voter turnout (voting age/registered)					67%/75%

==== Results by county ====
County	Al Gore DFL		George W. Bush Republican		Ralph Nader Green		Various candidates Other parties		Margin		Total votes cast
County	#	%	#	%	#	%	#	%	#	%	Total votes cast
Aitkin	3,830	46.37%	3,755	45.46%	403	4.88%	252	3.29%	75	0.91%	8,260
Anoka	68,008	46.70%	69,256	47.56%	6,616	4.54%	1,739	1.20%	-1,248	-0.86%	145,619
Becker	5,253	36.65%	8,152	56.88%	591	4.12%	337	2.35%	-2,899	-20.23%	14,333
Beltrami	7,301	42.41%	8,346	48.48%	1,269	7.37%	301	1.74%	-1,045	-6.07%	17,217
Benton	6,009	40.31%	7,663	51.40%	862	5.78%	374	2.51%	-1,654	-11.09%	14,908
Big Stone	1,430	47.99%	1,370	45.97%	109	3.66%	71	2.38%	60	2.02%	2,980
Blue Earth	12,329	44.99%	12,942	47.23%	1,761	6.43%	370	1.35%	-613	-2.24%	27,402
Brown	4,650	36.23%	7,370	57.43%	561	4.37%	253	1.97%	-2,720	-21.20%	12,834
Carlton	8,620	57.16%	5,578	36.99%	634	4.20%	249	1.65%	3,042	20.17%	15,081
Carver	12,462	35.58%	20,790	59.36%	1,381	3.94%	388	1.12%	-8,328	-23.78%	35,021
Cass	5,534	40.71%	7,134	52.48%	663	4.88%	262	1.93%	-1,600	-11.77%	13,593
Chippewa	2,952	46.47%	2,977	46.87%	268	4.22%	155	2.44%	-25	-0.40%	6,352
Chisago	9,593	43.63%	10,937	49.74%	1,116	5.08%	341	1.55%	-1,344	-6.11%	21,987
Clay	10,128	43.36%	11,712	50.14%	963	4.12%	555	2.38%	-1,584	-6.78%	23,358
Clearwater	1,466	38.34%	2,137	55.88%	134	3.50%	87	2.28%	-671	-17.54%	3,824
Cook	1,171	41.52%	1,295	45.92%	290	10.28%	64	2.28%	-124	-4.40%	2,820
Cottonwood	2,503	40.50%	3,369	54.51%	208	3.37%	101	1.62%	-866	-14.01%	6,181
Crow Wing	11,255	40.01%	15,035	53.45%	1,314	4.67%	524	1.87%	-3,780	-13.44%	28,128
Dakota	85,446	46.88%	87,250	47.87%	7,799	4.28%	1,755	0.97%	-1,804	-0.99%	182,249
Dodge	3,370	41.86%	4,213	52.34%	327	4.06%	140	1.74%	-843	-10.48%	8,050
Douglas	6,352	36.92%	9,811	57.02%	746	4.34%	296	1.72%	-3,459	-20.10%	17,205
Faribault	3,624	43.02%	4,336	51.47%	309	3.67%	155	1.84%	-712	-8.45%	8,424
Fillmore	5,020	49.10%	4,646	45.45%	409	4.00%	148	1.45%	374	3.65%	10,223
Freeborn	8,514	52.75%	6,843	42.40%	555	3.44%	227	1.41%	1,671	10.35%	16,139
Goodhue	9,981	44.84%	10,852	48.76%	1,093	4.91%	331	1.49%	-871	-3.92%	22,257
Grant	1,507	41.58%	1,804	49.78%	214	5.91%	99	2.73%	-297	-8.20%	3,624
Hennepin	307,599	53.60%	225,657	39.32%	35,584	6.20%	5,006	0.88%	81,942	14.28%	573,846
Houston	4,502	44.28%	5,077	49.94%	421	4.14%	167	1.64%	-575	-5.66%	10,167
Hubbard	3,632	37.78%	5,307	55.21%	484	5.03%	190	1.98%	-1,675	-17.43%	9,613
Isanti	6,247	41.84%	7,668	51.36%	753	5.04%	261	1.76%	-1,421	-9.52%	14,929
Itasca	10,583	48.74%	9,545	43.96%	1,137	5.24%	449	2.06%	1,038	4.78%	21,714
Jackson	2,364	43.47%	2,773	50.99%	194	3.57%	107	1.97%	-409	-7.52%	5,438
Kanabec	2,831	41.57%	3,480	51.09%	344	5.05%	156	2.29%	-649	-9.52%	6,811
Kandiyohi	8,220	42.62%	10,026	51.99%	734	3.81%	305	1.58%	-1,806	-9.37%	19,285
Kittson	1,107	41.98%	1,353	51.31%	68	2.58%	109	4.13%	-246	-9.33%	2,637
Koochiching	2,903	42.20%	3,523	51.21%	302	4.39%	151	2.20%	-620	-9.01%	6,879
Lac qui Parle	2,244	50.39%	1,941	43.59%	160	3.59%	108	2.43%	303	6.80%	4,453
Lake	3,579	54.53%	2,465	37.56%	426	6.49%	93	1.42%	1,114	16.97%	6,563
Lake of the Woods	848	38.77%	1,216	55.60%	74	3.38%	49	2.25%	-368	-16.83%	2,187
Le Sueur	5,361	43.48%	6,138	49.78%	603	4.89%	229	1.85%	-777	-6.30%	12,331
Lincoln	1,590	48.42%	1,513	46.07%	105	3.20%	76	2.31%	77	2.35%	3,284
Lyon	4,737	41.23%	6,087	52.98%	460	4.00%	205	1.79%	-1,350	-11.75%	11,489
Mahnomen	921	41.41%	1,122	50.45%	96	4.32%	85	3.82%	-201	-9.04%	2,224
Marshall	1,910	36.74%	2,912	56.01%	160	3.08%	217	4.17%	-1,002	-19.27%	5,199
Martin	4,166	40.17%	5,686	54.83%	376	3.63%	143	1.37%	-1,520	-14.66%	10,371
McLeod	5,609	36.44%	8,782	57.05%	681	4.42%	322	2.09%	-3,173	-20.61%	15,394
Meeker	4,402	41.25%	5,520	51.72%	517	4.84%	233	2.19%	-1,118	-10.47%	10,672
Mille Lacs	4,376	42.68%	5,223	50.94%	448	4.37%	206	2.01%	-847	-8.26%	10,253
Morrison	5,274	35.93%	8,197	55.85%	633	4.31%	573	3.91%	-2,923	-19.92%	14,677
Mower	10,693	57.86%	6,873	37.19%	678	3.67%	236	1.28%	3,820	20.67%	18,480
Murray	2,093	44.04%	2,407	50.64%	149	3.13%	104	2.19%	-314	-6.60%	4,753
Nicollet	7,041	45.94%	7,221	47.11%	842	5.49%	223	1.46%	-180	-1.17%	15,327
Nobles	3,760	42.38%	4,766	53.72%	238	2.68%	108	1.22%	-1,006	-11.34%	8,872
Norman	1,575	43.26%	1,808	49.66%	123	3.38%	135	3.70%	-233	-6.40%	3,641
Olmsted	25,822	43.48%	30,641	51.59%	2,198	3.70%	731	1.23%	-4,819	-8.11%	59,392
Otter Tail	9,844	34.53%	16,963	59.50%	1,120	3.93%	584	2.04%	-7,119	-24.97%	28,511
Pennington	2,458	38.89%	3,380	53.48%	255	4.03%	227	3.60%	-922	-14.59%	6,320
Pine	6,148	47.05%	5,854	44.80%	734	5.62%	332	2.53%	294	2.25%	13,068
Pipestone	1,970	40.25%	2,693	55.03%	140	2.86%	91	1.86%	-723	-14.78%	4,894
Polk	5,764	40.76%	7,609	53.81%	369	2.61%	398	2.82%	-1,845	-13.05%	14,140
Pope	2,771	46.28%	2,808	46.90%	264	4.41%	144	2.41%	-37	-0.62%	5,987
Ramsey	138,470	56.69%	87,669	35.89%	15,522	6.35%	2,617	1.07%	50,801	20.80%	244,278
Red Lake	830	39.71%	1,090	52.15%	68	3.25%	102	4.89%	-260	-12.44%	2,090
Redwood	2,681	34.60%	4,589	59.23%	314	4.05%	164	2.12%	-1,908	-24.63%	7,748
Renville	3,533	43.50%	4,036	49.69%	355	4.37%	198	2.44%	-503	-6.19%	8,122
Rice	13,140	50.50%	10,876	41.80%	1,639	6.30%	366	1.40%	2,264	8.70%	26,021
Rock	2,081	41.54%	2,772	55.33%	116	2.32%	41	0.81%	-691	-13.79%	5,010
Roseau	2,128	29.70%	4,695	65.52%	176	2.46%	167	2.32%	-2,567	-35.82%	7,166
St. Louis	64,237	59.78%	35,420	32.96%	6,290	5.85%	1,517	1.41%	28,817	26.82%	107,464
Scott	17,503	39.97%	23,954	54.70%	1,829	4.18%	507	1.15%	-6,451	-14.73%	43,793
Sherburne	12,109	39.27%	16,813	54.53%	1,501	4.87%	412	1.33%	-4,704	-15.26%	30,835
Sibley	2,687	36.63%	4,087	55.72%	361	4.92%	200	2.73%	-1,400	-19.09%	7,335
Stearns	24,800	39.70%	32,402	51.86%	3,820	6.11%	1,454	2.33%	-7,602	-12.16%	62,476
Steele	6,900	42.95%	8,223	51.18%	697	4.34%	246	1.53%	-1,323	-8.23%	16,066
Stevens	2,434	42.32%	2,831	49.22%	393	6.83%	94	1.63%	-397	-6.90%	5,752
Swift	2,698	49.62%	2,376	43.70%	218	4.01%	145	2.67%	322	5.92%	5,437
Todd	4,132	37.25%	6,031	54.37%	485	4.37%	444	4.01%	-1,899	-17.12%	11,092
Traverse	884	41.98%	1,074	51.00%	86	4.08%	62	2.94%	-190	-9.02%	2,106
Wabasha	4,522	42.94%	5,245	49.81%	571	5.42%	193	1.83%	-723	-6.87%	10,531
Wadena	2,251	35.27%	3,733	58.49%	253	3.96%	145	2.28%	-1,482	-23.22%	6,382
Waseca	3,694	41.67%	4,608	51.99%	398	4.49%	164	1.85%	-914	-10.32%	8,864
Washington	49,637	46.39%	51,502	48.13%	4,891	4.57%	979	0.91%	-1,865	-1.74%	107,009
Watonwan	2,258	43.98%	2,562	49.90%	212	4.13%	102	1.99%	-304	-5.92%	5,134
Wilkin	1,046	31.65%	2,032	61.48%	77	2.33%	150	4.54%	-986	-29.83%	3,305
Winona	11,069	46.28%	10,773	45.04%	1,750	7.32%	326	1.36%	296	1.24%	23,918
Wright	16,762	38.65%	23,861	55.02%	1,977	4.56%	766	1.77%	-7,099	-16.37%	43,366
Yellow Medicine	2,528	45.84%	2,598	47.11%	232	4.21%	157	2.84%	-70	-1.27%	5,515
Totals	1,168,266	47.91%	1,109,659	45.50%	126,696	5.20%	34,064	1.39%	58,607	2.41%	2,438,685

===== Counties that flipped from Democratic to Republican =====
- Anoka (largest city: Blaine)
- Becker (largest city: Detroit Lakes)
- Beltrami (largest city: Bemidji)
- Benton (largest city: Sauk Rapids)
- Blue Earth (largest city: Mankato)
- Cass (largest city: Lake Shore)
- Chippewa (largest city: Montevideo)
- Chisago (largest city: North Branch)
- Clay (largest city: Moorhead)
- Clearwater (largest city: Bagley)
- Cook (largest city: Grand Marais)
- Cottonwood (largest city: Windom)
- Crow Wing (largest city: Brainerd)
- Dakota (largest city: Hastings)
- Dodge (largest city: Kasson)
- Faribault (largest city: Blue Earth)
- Goodhue (largest city: Red Wing)
- Grant (largest city: Elbow Lake)
- Houston (largest city: La Crescent)
- Hubbard (largest city: Park Rapids)
- Isanti (largest city: Cambridge)
- Jackson (largest city: Jackson)
- Kanabec (largest city: Mora)
- Kandiyohi (largest city: Willmar)
- Kittson (largest city: Hallock)
- Koochiching (largest city: International Falls)
- Lake of the Woods (largest city: Baudette)
- Le Sueur (largest city: Le Sueur)
- Lyon (largest city: Marshall)
- Mahnomen (largest city: Mahnomen)
- Marshall (largest city: Warren)
- Martin (largest city: Fairmont)
- McLeod (largest city: Hutchinson)
- Meeker (largest city: Litchfield)
- Mille Lacs (largest city: Princeton)
- Morrison (largest city: Little Falls)
- Murray (largest city: Slayton)
- Nicollet (largest city: North Mankato)
- Nobles (largest city: Worthington)
- Norman (largest city: Ada)
- Pennington (largest city: Thief River Falls)
- Polk (largest city: East Grand Forks)
- Pope (largest city: Glenwood)
- Red Lake (largest city: Red Lake Falls)
- Renville (largest city: Olivia)
- Scott (largest city: Shakopee)
- Sherburne (largest city: Elk River)
- Sibley (largest city: Gaylord)
- Stearns (largest city: St. Cloud)
- Steele (largest city: Owatonna)
- Stevens (largest city: Morris)
- Todd (largest city: Long Prairie)
- Traverse (largest city: Wheaton)
- Wabasha (largest city: Lake City)
- Waseca (largest city: Waseca)
- Washington (largest city: Stillwater)
- Watonwan (largest city: St. James)
- Wright (largest city: Otsego)
- Yellow Medicine (largest city: Granite Falls)

==== By congressional district ====
Despite losing the state, Bush won five of eight congressional districts, including two that elected Democrats.

District	Gore	Bush	Representative
1st	46%	48%	Gil Gutknecht
2nd	40%	54%	David Minge
2nd	40%	54%	Mark Kennedy
3rd	45%	50%	Jim Ramstad
4th	56%	36%	Bruce Vento
4th	56%	36%	Betty McCollum
5th	63%	28%	Martin Olav Sabo
6th	46%	48%	Bill Luther
7th	39%	54%	Collin Peterson
8th	49%	44%	Jim Oberstar

== Electors ==
Technically the voters of Minnesota cast their ballots for electors: representatives to the Electoral College. Minnesota is allocated ten electors because it has eight congressional districts and two senators. All candidates who appear on the ballot or qualify to receive write-in votes must submit a list of 10 electors, who pledge to vote for their candidate and his or her running mate. Whoever wins the majority of votes in the state is awarded all 10 electoral votes. Their chosen electors then vote for president and vice president. Although electors are pledged to their candidate and running mate, they are not obligated to vote for them. An elector who votes for someone other than his or her candidate is known as a faithless elector.

The electors of each state and the District of Columbia met on December 18, 2000 to cast their votes for president and vice president. The Electoral College itself never meets as one body. Instead, the electors from each state and the District of Columbia met in their respective capitols.

The following were the members of the Electoral College from the state. All were pledged to and voted for Gore and Lieberman:

1. Carol Bartels
2. Prudy Cameron
3. Joan Campbell
4. Elmer Deutschmann
5. Elizabeth Kalisch
6. Matthew Little
7. Glenda Meixell
8. John Meuers
9. Janis Ray
10. Georgiana Ruzich

== See also ==
- United States presidential elections in Minnesota
