= Red Lake County, Minnesota =

County in Minnesota, United States

- County
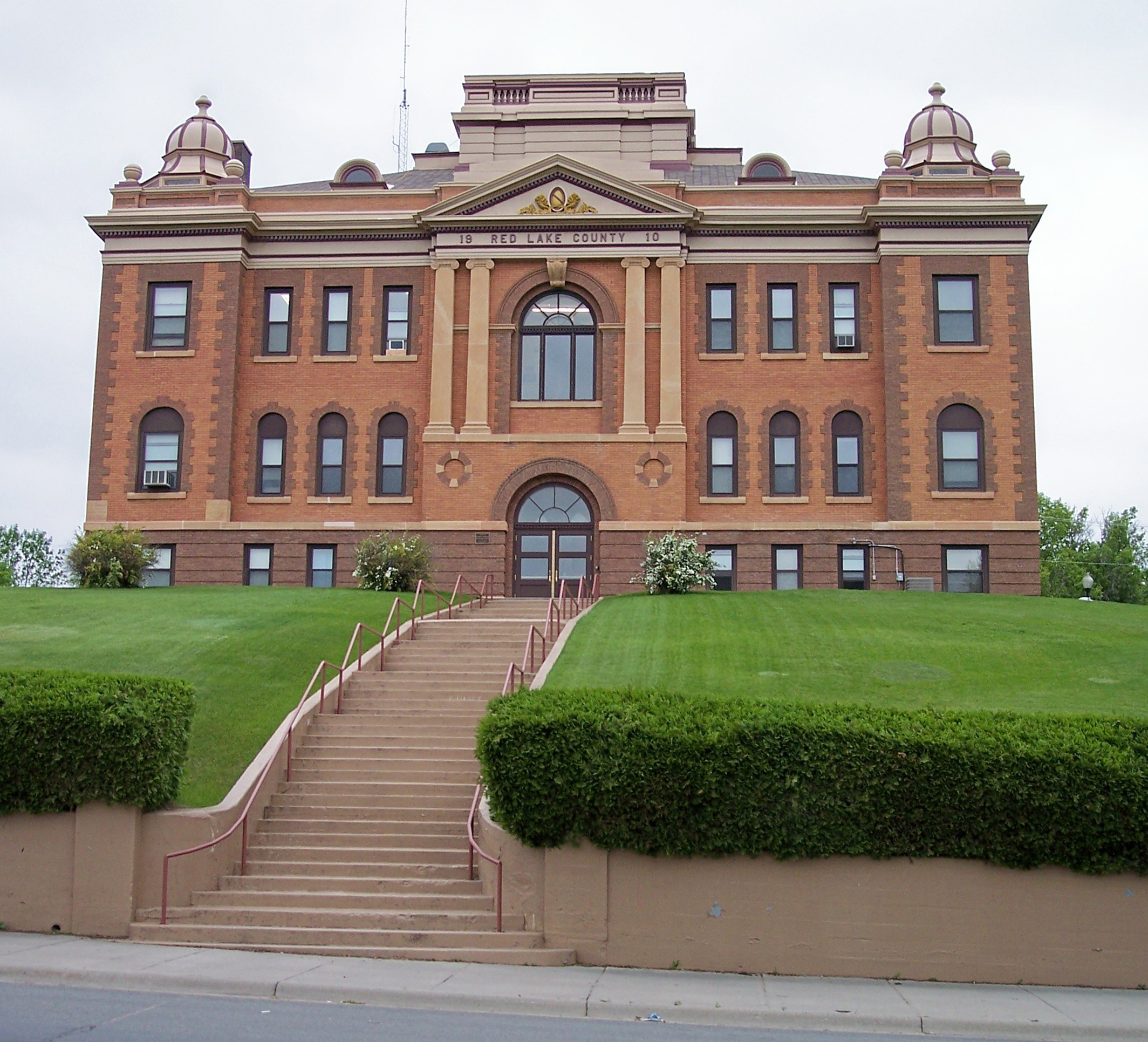
- The Red Lake County Courthouse in Red Lake Falls in 2007

- Location within the U.S. state of Minnesota
- Coordinates: 47°53′N 96°06′W
- Country: United States
- State: Minnesota
- Founded: December 24, 1896
- Named for: Red Lake River
- Seat: Red Lake Falls
- Largest city: Red Lake Falls

Area
  - Total: 432 sq mi (1,120 km^{2})
  - Land: 432 sq mi (1,120 km^{2})
  - Water: 0.09 sq mi (0.23 km^{2}) 0.02%

Population (2020)
  - Total: 3,935
  - Estimate (2025): 3,940 ▲
  - Density: 9.1/sq mi (3.5/km^{2})
- Time zone: UTC−6 (Central)
  - Summer (DST): UTC−5 (CDT)
- Congressional district: 7th
- Website: redlakecounty.gov

Red Lake County is a county in the Northwestern part of the U.S. state of Minnesota. As of the 2020 census, the population was 3,935, making it the third-least populous county in Minnesota. Its county seat is Red Lake Falls.

== History ==
Red Lake County was formed on December 24, 1896, from sections of Polk County. It was named for the Red Lake River. Its designated county seat was Red Lake Falls, which had been incorporated (as a village) in 1881.

The county has two sites on the National Register of Historic Places: the courthouse and Clearwater Evangelical Lutheran Church.

== Geography ==
The Red Lake River flows southward into the county from Pennington County. It is joined near Red Lake Falls by the Clearwater River; the combined flow (still known as the Red Lake River) flows southwestward to Huot, where it is augmented by the Black River, which drains the northwestern part of the county. The Red Lake River then flows southwestward into Polk County. The county terrain consists of low rolling hills, etched by drainages and gullies. The area is devoted to agriculture. The county terrain slopes to the west, with its highest elevation on its southeastern corner, at 1,201 ft (366 m) ASL. The county has a total area of 432 square miles (1,120 km^{2}), of which 432 square miles (1,120 km^{2}) is land and 0.09 square miles (0.23 km^{2}) (0.02%) is water.

Red Lake County is the only landlocked county in the United States (excluding those on international borders) to border exactly two other counties.

Soils of Red Lake County

=== Major highways ===
- U.S. Highway 2
- U.S. Highway 59
- Minnesota State Highway 32
- Minnesota State Highway 92
- Minnesota State Highway 222

=== Adjacent counties ===
- Pennington County – north
- Polk County – south

=== Protected areas ===
- Moran State Wildlife Management Area
- Old Crossing & Treaty County Wayside Park

== Demographics ==
Historical population
Census	Pop.	Note	%±
1900	12,195		—
1910	6,564		−46.2%
1920	7,263		10.6%
1930	6,887		−5.2%
1940	7,413		7.6%
1950	6,806		−8.2%
1960	5,830		−14.3%
1970	5,388		−7.6%
1980	5,471		1.5%
1990	4,525		−17.3%
2000	4,299		−5.0%
2010	4,089		−4.9%
2020	3,935		−3.8%
2025 (est.)	3,940	▲	0.1%
U.S. Decennial Census; 1790–1960 1900–1990; 1990–2000

=== Racial and ethnic composition ===
Red Lake County, Minnesota – Racial and ethnic composition Note: the US Census treats Hispanic/Latino as an ethnic category. This table excludes Latinos from the racial categories and assigns them to a separate category. Hispanics/Latinos may be of any race.
Race / Ethnicity (NH = Non-Hispanic)	Pop 1980	Pop 1990	Pop 2000	Pop 2010	Pop 2020	% 1980	% 1990	% 2000	% 2010	% 2020
White alone (NH)	5,440	4,469	4,181	3,876	3,625	99.43%	98.76%	97.26%	94.79%	92.12%
Black or African American alone (NH)	0	0	8	7	15	0.00%	0.00%	0.19%	0.17%	0.38%
Native American or Alaska Native alone (NH)	7	7	79	52	57	0.13%	0.15%	1.84%	1.27%	1.45%
Asian alone (NH)	8	3	3	4	5	0.15%	0.07%	0.07%	0.10%	0.13%
Native Hawaiian or Pacific Islander alone (NH)	x	x	0	0	3	x	x	0.00%	0.00%	0.08%
Other race alone (NH)	2	0	0	0	14	0.04%	0.00%	0.00%	0.00%	0.36%
Mixed race or Multiracial (NH)	x	x	15	49	113	x	x	0.35%	1.20%	2.87%
Hispanic or Latino (any race)	14	46	13	101	103	0.26%	1.02%	0.30%	2.47%	2.62%
Total	5,471	4,525	4,299	4,089	3,935	100.00%	100.00%	100.00%	100.00%	100.00%

=== 2020 census ===
As of the 2020 census, the county had a population of 3,935. The median age was 42.2 years. 24.1% of residents were under the age of 18 and 21.1% of residents were 65 years of age or older. For every 100 females there were 107.9 males, and for every 100 females age 18 and over there were 108.0 males age 18 and over.

The racial makeup of the county was 92.7% White, 0.4% Black or African American, 1.5% American Indian and Alaska Native, 0.2% Asian, 0.1% Native Hawaiian and Pacific Islander, 1.3% from some other race, and 3.8% from two or more races. Hispanic or Latino residents of any race comprised 2.6% of the population.

<0.1% of residents lived in urban areas, while 100.0% lived in rural areas.

There were 1,653 households in the county, of which 29.0% had children under the age of 18 living in them. Of all households, 50.7% were married-couple households, 22.9% were households with a male householder and no spouse or partner present, and 19.4% were households with a female householder and no spouse or partner present. About 31.2% of all households were made up of individuals and 13.8% had someone living alone who was 65 years of age or older.

There were 1,876 housing units, of which 11.9% were vacant. Among occupied housing units, 80.4% were owner-occupied and 19.6% were renter-occupied. The homeowner vacancy rate was 1.0% and the rental vacancy rate was 15.0%.

=== 2000 census ===
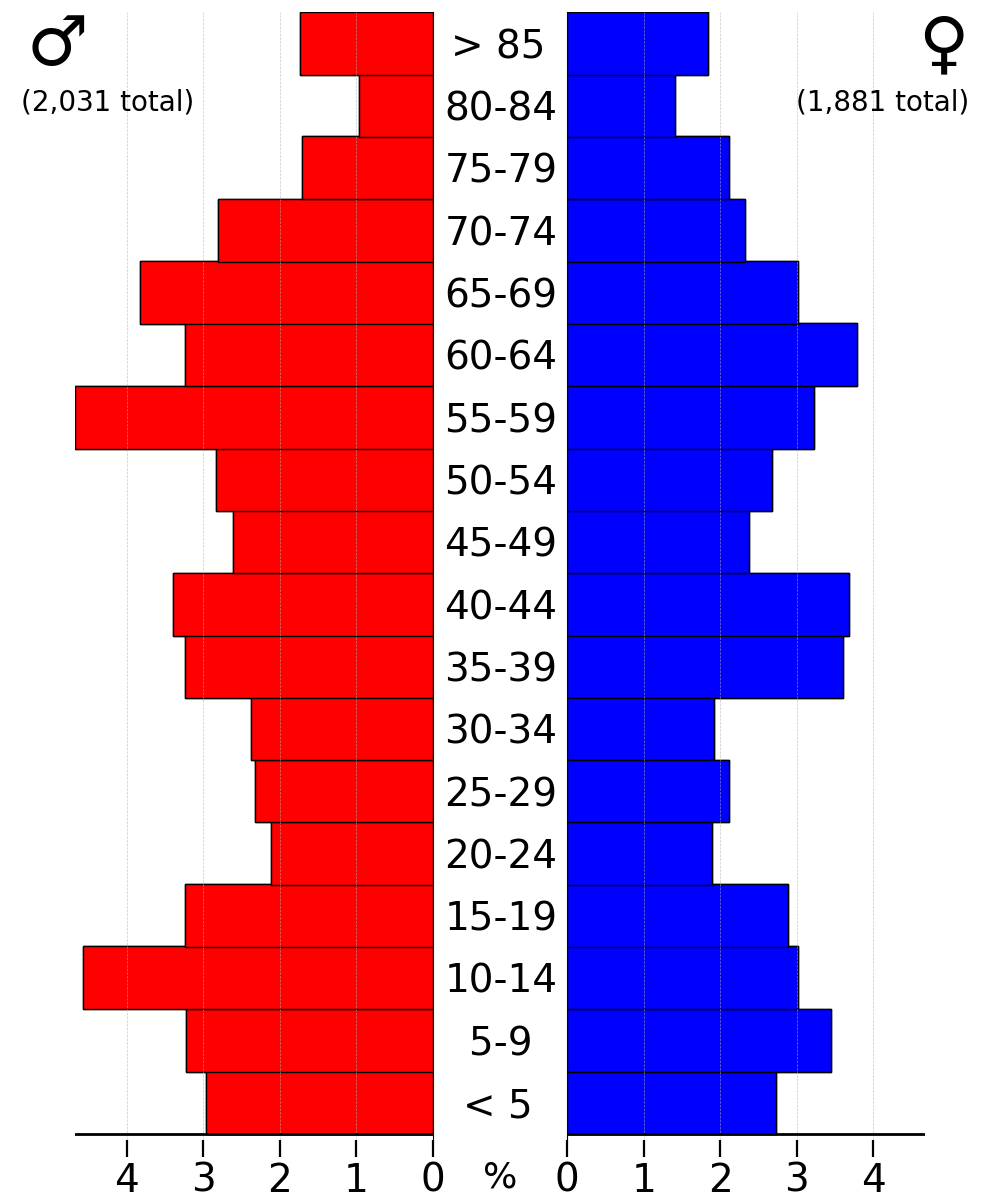
2022 US Census population pyramid for Red Lake County, from ACS 5-year estimates

As of the census of 2000, there were 4,299 people, 1,727 households, and 1,131 families in the county. The population density was 9.95/mi^{2} (3.84/km^{2}). There were 1,883 housing units at an average density of 4.36/mi^{2} (1.68/km^{2}). The racial makeup of the county was 97.44% White, 0.19% Black or African American, 1.84% Native American, 0.07% Asian, 0.12% from other races, and 0.35% from two or more races. 0.30% of the population were Hispanic or Latino of any race. 31.9% were of Norwegian, 25.0% German, 16.7% French and 6.3% French Canadian ancestry.

There were 1,727 households, out of which 30.70% had children under the age of 18 living with them, 55.40% were married couples living together, 6.80% had a female householder with no husband present, and 34.50% were non-families. 30.50% of all households were made up of individuals, and 15.50% had someone living alone who was 65 years of age or older. The average household size was 2.39 and the average family size was 3.02.

The county population contained 25.50% under the age of 18, 7.50% from 18 to 24, 24.70% from 25 to 44, 23.20% from 45 to 64, and 19.10% who were 65 years of age or older. The median age was 40 years. For every 100 females there were 100.80 males. For every 100 females age 18 and over, there were 99.90 males.

The median income for a household in the county was $32,052, and the median income for a family was $40,275. Males had a median income of $28,494 versus $20,363 for females. The per capita income for the county was $15,372. About 8.40% of families and 10.80% of the population were below the poverty line, including 11.50% of those under age 18 and 13.10% of those age 65 or over.

== Communities ==
=== Cities ===
- Brooks
- Oklee
- Plummer
- Red Lake Falls (county seat)

=== Unincorporated communities ===
- Dorothy
- Garnes
- Huot
- Perault
- Terrebonne
- Wylie

Townships of Red Lake County

=== Townships ===
- Browns Creek Township
- Emardville Township
- Equality Township
- Garnes Township
- Gervais Township
- Lake Pleasant Township
- Lambert Township
- Louisville Township
- Poplar River Township
- Red Lake Falls Township
- River Township
- Terrebonne Township
- Wylie Township

== Government and politics ==
Red Lake County was formerly solidly Democratic, voting for that party's presidential nominee in all elections from 1928 until 1996, although since 2000 it has generally voted Republican, with the exception of its support for Barack Obama in 2008. In 2020, Donald Trump showed the best performance by a Republican since 1904, and he broke this record again in 2024.

United States presidential election results for Red Lake County, Minnesota
Year	Republican		Democratic		Third party(ies)	
Year	No.	%	No.	%	No.	%
1900	823	39.10%	1,165	55.34%	117	5.56%
1904	1,430	68.00%	399	18.97%	274	13.03%
1908	1,428	53.01%	856	31.77%	410	15.22%
1912	259	27.88%	374	40.26%	296	31.86%
1916	463	37.70%	694	56.51%	71	5.78%
1920	1,308	62.37%	558	26.61%	231	11.02%
1924	643	35.19%	213	11.66%	971	53.15%
1928	712	31.56%	1,507	66.80%	37	1.64%
1932	351	14.99%	1,893	80.86%	97	4.14%
1936	487	18.36%	2,057	77.53%	109	4.11%
1940	876	30.05%	2,023	69.40%	16	0.55%
1944	757	31.36%	1,642	68.02%	15	0.62%
1948	592	23.99%	1,771	71.76%	105	4.25%
1952	1,034	41.51%	1,431	57.45%	26	1.04%
1956	782	33.35%	1,555	66.31%	8	0.34%
1960	679	26.64%	1,865	73.17%	5	0.20%
1964	573	23.39%	1,861	75.96%	16	0.65%
1968	718	30.97%	1,467	63.29%	133	5.74%
1972	1,052	41.40%	1,409	55.45%	80	3.15%
1976	737	28.35%	1,748	67.23%	115	4.42%
1980	1,223	45.18%	1,318	48.69%	166	6.13%
1984	1,184	47.49%	1,294	51.91%	15	0.60%
1988	918	42.21%	1,229	56.51%	28	1.29%
1992	691	31.39%	1,020	46.34%	490	22.26%
1996	695	33.00%	1,053	50.00%	358	17.00%
2000	1,090	52.15%	830	39.71%	170	8.13%
2004	1,164	53.47%	963	44.24%	50	2.30%
2008	983	44.87%	1,120	51.12%	88	4.02%
2012	978	49.52%	928	46.99%	69	3.49%
2016	1,141	60.66%	540	28.71%	200	10.63%
2020	1,454	66.21%	691	31.47%	51	2.32%
2024	1,425	67.34%	642	30.34%	49	2.32%

County Board of Commissioners
Position	Name	District
Commissioner	Anthony "Chuck" Flage	District 1
Commissioner and Chairperson	Ron Weiss	District 2
Commissioner	Delane "John" Dudycha	District 3
Commissioner	Allen Remick	District 4
Commissioner	Charles Simpson	District 5

State Legislature (2023–2025)
Position	Name	Affiliation	District
Senate	Mark Johnson	Republican	District 1
House of Representatives	Steve Gander	Republican	District 1B

U.S Congress (2023–2025)
Position	Name	Affiliation	District
House of Representatives	Michelle Fischbach	Republican	7th
Senate	Amy Klobuchar	Democrat	N/A
Senate	Tina Smith	Democrat	N/A

== Media attention ==
In 2015, the county received mention in the media when a Washington Post reporter, Christopher Ingraham, wrote a story calling Red Lake County "the absolute worst place to live in America" in a ranking of US counties by "scenery and climate" based on the USDA's Natural Amenity Scale. After vigorous objections from local and state inhabitants and legislators, Ingraham subsequently visited the county and not only reversed his position but later moved there with his family and wrote a book about his experience.

== See also ==
- National Register of Historic Places listings in Red Lake County, Minnesota
