= Browns Creek Township =

Browns Creek Township may refer to the following townships in the United States:

- Browns Creek Township, Jewell County, Kansas
- Browns Creek Township, Red Lake County, Minnesota
