= Garnes Township, Red Lake County, Minnesota =

Garnes Township, Minnesota
- Township
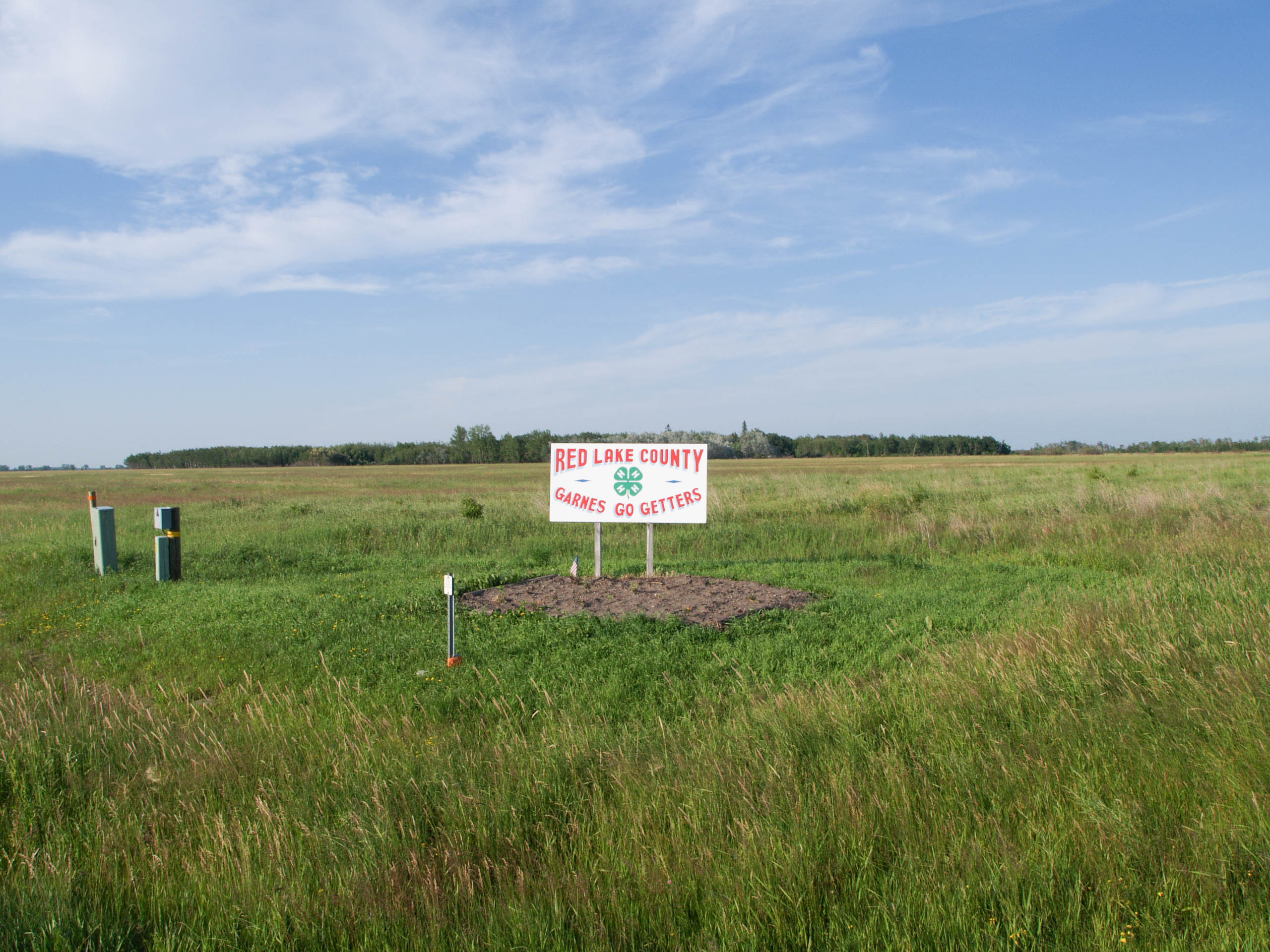
- 4-H sign

- Location of Garnes Township, within Red Lake County, Minnesota
- Coordinates: 47°54′49″N 95°54′46″W
- Country: United States
- State: Minnesota
- County: Red Lake

Area
  - Total: 48.3 sq mi (125.1 km^{2})
  - Land: 48.3 sq mi (125.1 km^{2})
  - Water: 0 sq mi (0.0 km^{2})
- Elevation: 1,152 ft (351 m)

Population (2020)
  - Total: 178
  - Density: 3.69/sq mi (1.42/km^{2})
- Time zone: UTC-6 (Central (CST))
  - Summer (DST): UTC-5 (CDT)
- FIPS code: 27-23174
- GNIS feature ID: 0664247

Garnes Township is a township in Red Lake County, Minnesota, United States. The population was 178 at the 2020 census.

Garnes Township was named for the phonetic version of the last name of Ellef K. Gjernes, a Norwegian settler from Ål in Hallingdal, Norway, who was the township's first postmaster in 1897.

== Geography ==
According to the United States Census Bureau, the township has a total area of 48.3 square miles (125 km^{2}), all land.

== Demographics ==
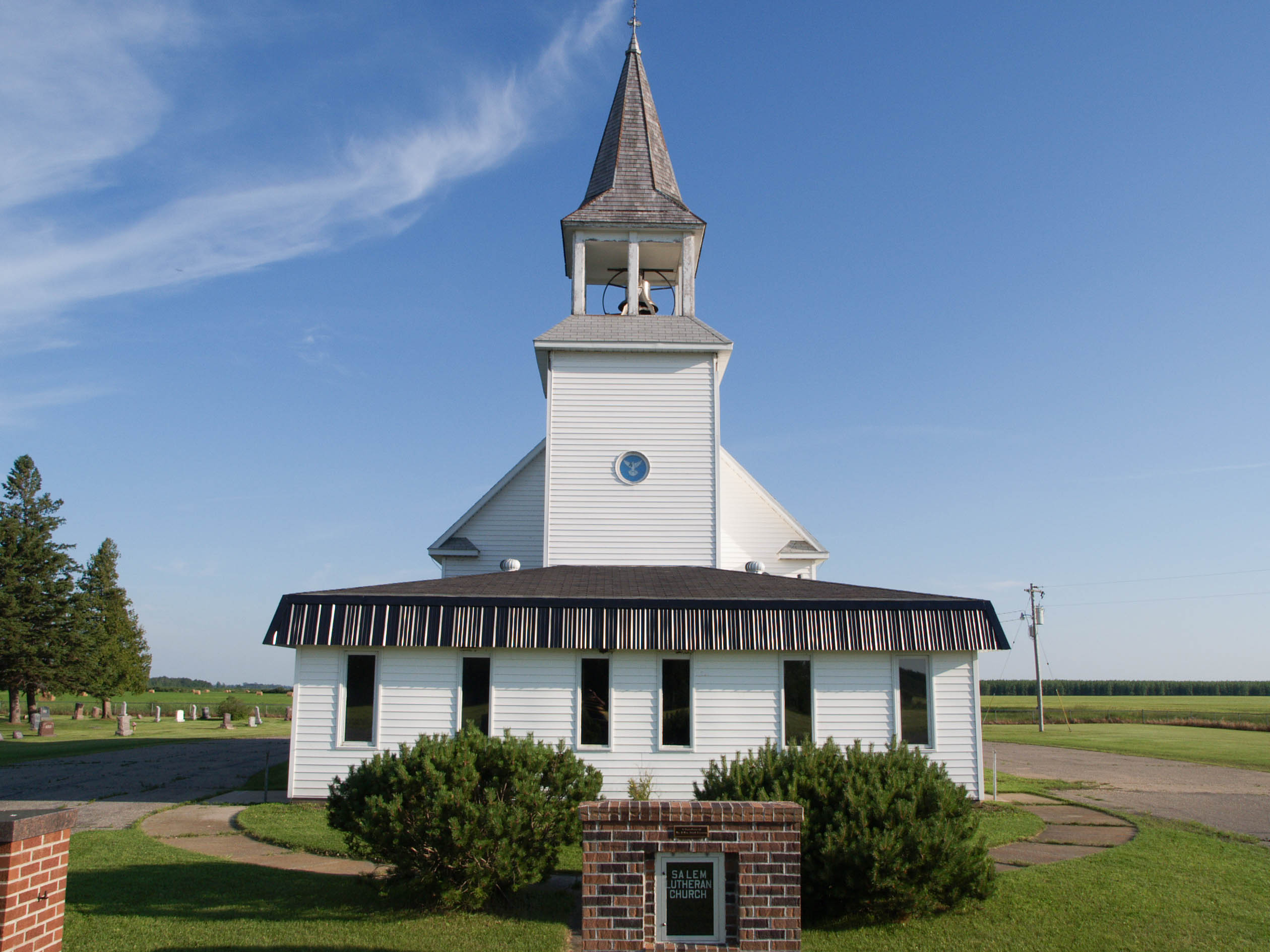
Salem Lutheran Church in Garnes

As of the census of 2000, there were 174 people, 70 households, and 49 families residing in the township. The population density was 3.6 inhabitants per square mile (1.4/km^{2}). There were 80 housing units at an average density of 1.7 per square mile (0.66/km^{2}). The racial makeup of the township was 96.55% White, 2.87% African American and 0.57% Native American. Hispanic or Latino of any race were 0.57% of the population.

There were 70 households, out of which 31.4% had children under the age of 18 living with them, 64.3% were married couples living together, 1.4% had a female householder with no husband present, and 28.6% were non-families. 25.7% of all households were made up of individuals, and 11.4% had someone living alone who was 65 years of age or older. The average household size was 2.49 and the average family size was 3.00.

In the township the population was spread out, with 25.3% under the age of 18, 9.2% from 18 to 24, 25.3% from 25 to 44, 26.4% from 45 to 64, and 13.8% who were 65 years of age or older. The median age was 37 years. For every 100 females, there were 120.3 males. For every 100 females age 18 and over, there were 132.1 males.

The median income for a household in the township was $40,625, and the median income for a family was $48,438. Males had a median income of $25,625 versus $19,688 for females. The per capita income for the township was $16,725. About 8.8% of families and 11.2% of the population were below the poverty line, including 14.0% of those under the age of eighteen and 50.0% of those 65 or over.
