= Emardville Township, Red Lake County, Minnesota =

Emardville Township, Minnesota
- Township
- Location of Emardville Township, within Red Lake County, Minnesota
- Coordinates: 47°53′45″N 96°1′46″W
- Country: United States
- State: Minnesota
- County: Red Lake

Area
  - Total: 45.6 sq mi (118.2 km^{2})
  - Land: 45.6 sq mi (118.2 km^{2})
  - Water: 0 sq mi (0.0 km^{2})
- Elevation: 1,132 ft (345 m)

Population (2020)
  - Total: 209
  - Density: 4.58/sq mi (1.77/km^{2})
- Time zone: UTC-6 (Central (CST))
  - Summer (DST): UTC-5 (CDT)
- FIPS code: 27-19196
- GNIS feature ID: 0664093

Emardville Township is a township in Red Lake County, Minnesota, United States. The population was 209 at the 2020 census.

Emardville Township was named for Pierre Emard, a pioneer settler.

== Geography ==
According to the United States Census Bureau, the township has a total area of 45.6 square miles (118 km^{2}), all land.

== Demographics ==
As of the census of 2000, there were 217 people, 81 households, and 55 families residing in the township. The population density was 4.8 inhabitants per square mile (1.9/km^{2}). There were 95 housing units at an average density of 2.1 per square mile (0.81/km^{2}). The racial makeup of the township was 100.00% White.

There were 81 households, out of which 40.7% had children under the age of 18 living with them, 58.0% were married couples living together, 8.6% had a female householder with no husband present, and 30.9% were non-families. 28.4% of all households were made up of individuals, and 9.9% had someone living alone who was 65 years of age or older. The average household size was 2.68 and the average family size was 3.36.

In the township the population was spread out, with 31.8% under the age of 18, 10.1% from 18 to 24, 24.9% from 25 to 44, 24.4% from 45 to 64, and 8.8% who were 65 years of age or older. The median age was 34 years. For every 100 females, there were 106.7 males. For every 100 females age 18 and over, there were 124.2 males.

The median income for a household in the township was $26,875, and the median income for a family was $31,719. Males had a median income of $25,625 versus $21,094 for females. The per capita income for the township was $11,943. About 18.0% of families and 18.7% of the population were below the poverty line, including 26.2% of those under the age of eighteen and 5.7% of those 65 or over.
