= Perault, Minnesota =

Perault
- Unincorporated community
- Location within Minnesota Location within the United States
- Country: United States
- State: Minnesota
- County: Red Lake
- Elevation: 1,053 ft (321 m)
- Time zone: UTC-6 (Central (CST))
  - Summer (DST): UTC-5 (CDT)
- Area code: 218
- GNIS feature ID: 654873

Perault is an unincorporated community in Red Lake County, in the U.S. state of Minnesota.

== History ==
The community was named for Charles Perrault, an early settler.
