= Wylie Township, Red Lake County, Minnesota =

Wylie Township, Minnesota
- Township
- Location of Wylie Township, within Red Lake County, Minnesota
- Coordinates: 47°56′39″N 96°25′37″W
- Country: United States
- State: Minnesota
- County: Red Lake

Area
  - Total: 12.1 sq mi (31.3 km^{2})
  - Land: 12.1 sq mi (31.3 km^{2})
  - Water: 0 sq mi (0.0 km^{2})
- Elevation: 991 ft (302 m)

Population (2020)
  - Total: 58
  - Density: 4.8/sq mi (1.9/km^{2})
- Time zone: UTC-6 (Central (CST))
  - Summer (DST): UTC-5 (CDT)
- FIPS code: 27-71986
- GNIS feature ID: 0666063

Wylie Township is a township in Red Lake County, Minnesota, United States. The population was 58 at the 2020 census.

== History ==
Wylie Township was named for a pioneer settler.

== Geography ==
According to the United States Census Bureau, the township has a total area of 12.1 square miles (31.3 km^{2}), all land.

== Demographics ==
As of the census of 2000, there were 72 people, 23 households, and 20 families residing in the township. The population density was 6.0 people per square mile (2.3/km^{2}). There were 23 housing units at an average density of 1.9/sq mi (0.7/km^{2}). The racial makeup of the township was 100.00% White.

There were 23 households, out of which 39.1% had children under the age of 18 living with them, 78.3% were married couples living together, 8.7% had a female householder with no husband present, and 8.7% were non-families. No households were made up of individuals, and none had someone living alone who was 65 years of age or older. The average household size was 3.13 and the average family size was 3.19.

In the township the population was spread out, with 30.6% under the age of 18, 5.6% from 18 to 24, 26.4% from 25 to 44, 20.8% from 45 to 64, and 16.7% who were 65 years of age or older. The median age was 36 years. For every 100 females, there were 94.6 males. For every 100 females age 18 and over, there were 108.3 males.

The median income for a household in the township was $36,250, and the median income for a family was $40,938. Males had a median income of $26,250 versus $21,250 for females. The per capita income for the township was $12,959. There were 10.5% of families and 10.9% of the population living below the poverty line, including no under eighteens and 20.0% of those over 64.
