= Poplar River Township, Red Lake County, Minnesota =

Poplar River Township, Minnesota
- Township
- Location of Poplar River Township, within Red Lake County, Minnesota
- Coordinates: 47°48′44″N 96°1′13″W
- Country: United States
- State: Minnesota
- County: Red Lake

Area
  - Total: 34.9 sq mi (90.5 km^{2})
  - Land: 34.9 sq mi (90.5 km^{2})
  - Water: 0 sq mi (0.0 km^{2})
- Elevation: 1,125 ft (343 m)

Population (2020)
  - Total: 115
  - Density: 3.29/sq mi (1.27/km^{2})
- Time zone: UTC-6 (Central (CST))
  - Summer (DST): UTC-5 (CDT)
- FIPS code: 27-52000
- GNIS feature ID: 0665339

Poplar River Township is a township in Red Lake County, Minnesota, United States. In reference to the 2020 census, the population was at 115. As of 2022, according to City population, it was estimated to be at 115.

This township took its name from the Poplar River.

== Geography ==
According to the United States Census Bureau, the township has a total area of 34.9 square miles (90.5 km^{2}), all land.

== Demographics ==
=== Age ===
According to a 2021 census the Median age is 64.8. 5.8% was 0–9 years old. 13% was 10-19. 1.5% was 20-29. 4.4% was 30-39. 10.1% was 40-49. 8.7% was 50-59. 27.5% was 60-69. 21.7% was 70-79. 7.3% was 80+.

=== Sex and ethnicity ===
61% of the population was male and 39 was female. 99% was White and 1% was Hispanic.

=== Income ===
69.9% made under $50k. 17.1% made $50k-$100k. 20% made $100k-$200k.
