= Red Lake Falls Township, Red Lake County, Minnesota =

Red Lake Falls Township, Minnesota
- Township
- Location of Red Lake Falls Township, within Red Lake County, Minnesota
- Coordinates: 47°53′42″N 96°16′28″W
- Country: United States
- State: Minnesota
- County: Red Lake

Area
  - Total: 34.0 sq mi (88.0 km^{2})
  - Land: 33.9 sq mi (87.9 km^{2})
  - Water: 0.039 sq mi (0.1 km^{2})
- Elevation: 980 ft (300 m)

Population (2020)
  - Total: 192
  - Density: 5.66/sq mi (2.18/km^{2})
- Time zone: UTC-6 (Central (CST))
  - Summer (DST): UTC-5 (CDT)
- ZIP code: 56750
- Area code: 218
- FIPS code: 27-53494
- GNIS feature ID: 0665386

Red Lake Falls Township is a township in Red Lake County, Minnesota, United States. The population was 192 at the 2020 census.

== Geography ==
According to the United States Census Bureau, the township has a total area of 34.0 square miles (88.0 km^{2}); 34.0 square miles (87.9 km^{2}) is land and 0.04 square miles (0.1 km^{2} = 0.09%) is water. The township's area was reduced in 1881, when the town of Red Lake Falls was incorporated within its borders.

== Demographics ==
As of the census of 2000, there were 206 people, 86 households, and 60 families residing in the township. The population density was 6.1 people per square mile (2.3/km^{2}). There were 88 housing units at an average density of 2.6/sq mi (1.0/km^{2}). The racial makeup of the township was 100.00% White.

There were 86 households, out of which 24.4% had children under the age of 18 living with them, 67.4% were married couples living together, 2.3% had a female householder with no husband present, and 29.1% were non-families. 25.6% of all households were made up of individuals, and 9.3% had someone living alone who was 65 years of age or older. The average household size was 2.40 and the average family size was 2.92.

In the township, the population was spread out, with 20.4% under the age of 18, 6.8% from 18 to 24, 25.2% from 25 to 44, 31.1% from 45 to 64, and 16.5% who were 65 years of age or older. The median age was 44 years. For every 100 females, there were 116.8 males. For every 100 females age 18 and over, there were 115.8 males.

The median income for a household in the township was $36,250, and the median income for a family was $38,750. Males had a median income of $25,179 versus $17,321 for females. The per capita income for the township was $16,833. About 7.1% of families and 8.5% of the population were below the poverty line, including none of those under the age of eighteen and 13.6% of those 65 or over.
