= Gervais Township, Red Lake County, Minnesota =

Gervais Township, Minnesota
- Township
- Location of Gervais Township, within Red Lake County, Minnesota
- Coordinates: 47°54′1″N 96°9′10″W
- Country: United States
- State: Minnesota
- County: Red Lake

Area
  - Total: 35.6 sq mi (92.2 km^{2})
  - Land: 35.6 sq mi (92.2 km^{2})
  - Water: 0 sq mi (0.0 km^{2})
- Elevation: 1,076 ft (328 m)

Population (2020)
  - Total: 235
  - Density: 6.60/sq mi (2.55/km^{2})
- Time zone: UTC-6 (Central (CST))
  - Summer (DST): UTC-5 (CDT)
- FIPS code: 27-23588
- GNIS feature ID: 0664263

Gervais Township is a township in Red Lake County, Minnesota, United States. The population was 235 at the 2020 census.

Gervais Township was named for Isiah Gervais, a pioneer settler.

== Geography ==
According to the United States Census Bureau, the township has a total area of 35.6 square miles (92 km^{2}), all land.

== Demographics ==
As of the census of 2000, there were 250 people, 95 households, and 72 families residing in the township. The population density was 7.0 inhabitants per square mile (2.7/km^{2}). There were 101 housing units at an average density of 2.8 per square mile (1.1/km^{2}). The racial makeup of the township was 98.00% White, 0.40% Native American, 0.40% Asian, and 1.20% from two or more races.

There were 95 households, of which 30.5% had children under the age of 18 living with them, 71.6% were married couples living together, 1.1% had a female householder with no husband present, and 23.2% were non-families. 18.9% of all households were made up of individuals, and 5.3% had someone living alone who was 65 years of age or older. The average household size was 2.63 and the average family size was 3.01.

In the township, the population was spread out, with 26.0% under the age of 18, 5.6% from 18 to 24, 23.2% from 25 to 44, 33.6% from 45 to 64, and 11.6% who were 65 years of age or older. The median age was 42 years. For every 100 females, there were 106.6 males. For every 100 females age 18 and over, there were 112.6 males.

The median income for a household in the township was $42,188, and the median income for a family was $47,143. Males had a median income of $32,250 versus $18,333 for females. The per capita income for the township was $18,022. About 8.8% of families and 12.9% of the population were below the poverty line, including 22.4% of those under the age of eighteen and 8.0% of those 65 or over.
