= 1904 United States presidential election in Minnesota =

- November 8, 1904
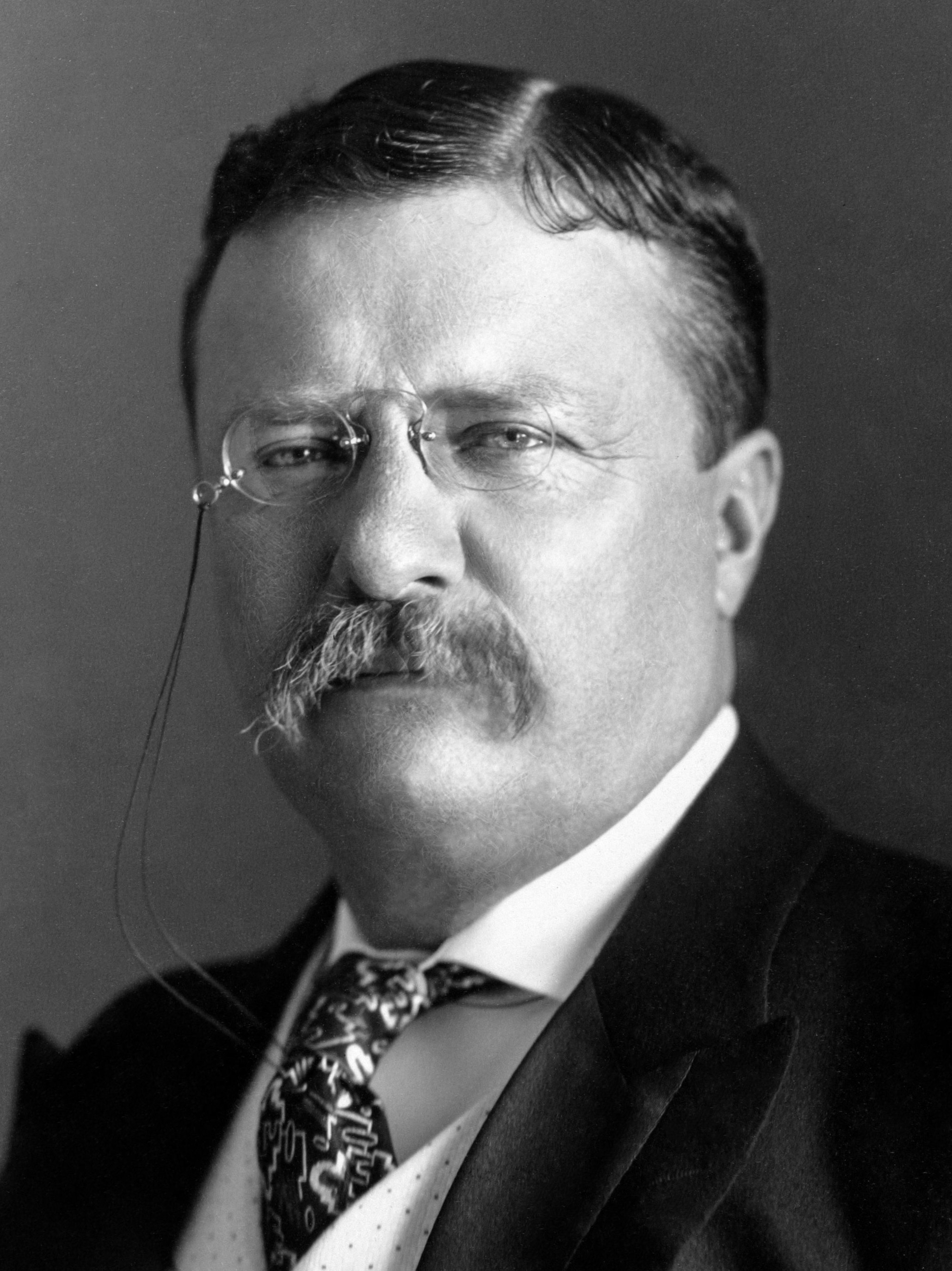

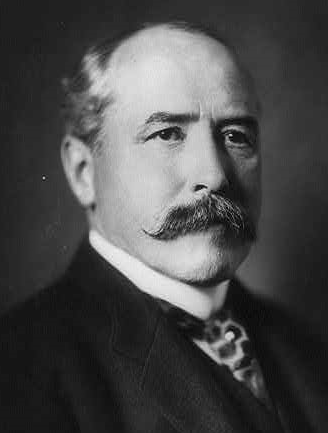
Nominee	Theodore Roosevelt	Alton B. Parker
Party	Republican	Democratic
Home state	New York	New York
Running mate	Charles W. Fairbanks	Henry G. Davis
Electoral vote	11	0
Popular vote	216,651	55,187
Percentage	73.98%	18.84%
County results
Roosevelt
50–60%
60–70%
70–80%
80–90%
90–100%
President before election
Theodore Roosevelt
Republican
Elected President
Theodore Roosevelt
Republican

The 1904 United States presidential election in Minnesota took place on November 8, 1904. All contemporary 45 states were part of the 1904 United States presidential election. Minnesota voters chose 11 electors to the Electoral College, which selected the president and vice president.

Minnesota was won by the Republican nominees, incumbent President Theodore Roosevelt of New York and his running mate Charles W. Fairbanks of Indiana. They defeated the Democratic nominees, former Chief Judge of New York Court of Appeals Alton B. Parker and his running mate, former US Senator Henry G. Davis of West Virginia. Roosevelt won the state by a margin of 55.14 points.

Roosevelt carried all of Minnesota's counties, becoming the first presidential candidate to do so. The only other presidential candidate to sweep all of the state's counties has been Warren G. Harding in 1920. In addition, with 73.98 percent of the popular vote, Minnesota would be Roosevelt's third strongest victory in terms of percentage in the popular vote after Vermont and North Dakota. Roosevelt's 73.98 percent constitutes the best performance by any presidential candidate since Minnesota's statehood in 1858.

== Results ==
1904 United States presidential election in Minnesota
Party	Candidate	Votes	Percentage	Electoral votes
Republican	Theodore Roosevelt (incumbent)	216,651	73.98%	11
Democratic	Alton B. Parker	55,187	18.84%	0
Social Democratic	Eugene V. Debs	11,692	3.99%	0
Prohibition	Silas C. Swallow	6,253	2.14%	0
Populist	Thomas E. Watson	2,103	0.72%	0
Socialist Labor	Charles Hunter Corregan	974	0.33%	0
Totals		292,860	100.00%	11
Voter turnout				—

=== Results by county ===
Counties carried by Roosevelt/Fairbanks

County	Theodore Roosevelt Republican		Alton B. Parker Democratic		Eugene V. Debs Public Ownership		Silas C. Swallow Prohibition		Various candidates Other parties		Margin		Total votes cast	
County	#	%	#	%	#	%	#	%	#	%	#	%	#	
Aitkin	1,327	80.96%	191	11.65%	61	3.72%	39	2.38%	21	1.28%	1,136	69.31%	1,639	AI
Anoka	1,557	82.25%	283	14.95%	20	1.06%	20	1.06%	13	0.69%	1,274	67.30%	1,893	AN
Becker	1,872	79.49%	310	13.16%	68	2.89%	84	3.57%	21	0.89%	1,562	66.33%	2,355	BK
Beltrami	1,953	82.37%	234	9.87%	132	5.57%	26	1.10%	26	1.10%	1,719	72.50%	2,371	BL
Benton	1,205	71.90%	433	25.84%	20	1.19%	9	0.54%	9	0.54%	772	46.06%	1,676	BN
Big Stone	1,234	73.10%	318	18.84%	68	4.03%	54	3.20%	14	0.83%	916	54.27%	1,688	BS
Blue Earth	3,573	67.42%	1,419	26.77%	135	2.55%	142	2.68%	31	0.58%	2,154	40.64%	5,300	BE
Brown	2,073	68.39%	869	28.67%	53	1.75%	27	0.89%	9	0.30%	1,204	39.72%	3,031	BR
Carlton	1,480	76.92%	236	12.27%	175	9.10%	19	0.99%	14	0.73%	1,244	64.66%	1,924	CT
Carver	1,735	70.44%	672	27.28%	25	1.02%	19	0.77%	12	0.49%	1,063	43.16%	2,463	CA
Cass	1,178	74.79%	222	14.10%	136	8.63%	17	1.08%	22	1.40%	956	60.70%	1,575	CS
Chippewa	1,830	79.60%	338	14.70%	32	1.39%	86	3.74%	13	0.57%	1,492	64.90%	2,299	CP
Chisago	2,417	91.45%	156	5.90%	46	1.74%	16	0.61%	8	0.30%	2,261	85.55%	2,643	CH
Clay	2,185	78.15%	388	13.88%	101	3.61%	81	2.90%	41	1.47%	1,797	64.27%	2,796	CY
Clearwater	903	85.27%	79	7.46%	38	3.59%	13	1.23%	26	2.46%	824	77.81%	1,059	CL
Cook	207	82.80%	31	12.40%	3	1.20%	9	3.60%	0	0.00%	176	70.40%	250	CK
Cottonwood	1,536	84.44%	213	11.71%	7	0.38%	43	2.36%	20	1.10%	1,323	72.73%	1,819	CD
Crow Wing	2,150	77.01%	333	11.93%	242	8.67%	36	1.29%	31	1.11%	1,817	65.08%	2,792	CW
Dakota	2,685	68.69%	1,078	27.58%	56	1.43%	68	1.74%	22	0.56%	1,607	41.11%	3,909	DK
Dodge	1,499	75.86%	319	16.14%	21	1.06%	96	4.86%	41	2.07%	1,180	59.72%	1,976	DO
Douglas	2,171	79.41%	410	15.00%	56	2.05%	69	2.52%	28	1.02%	1,761	64.41%	2,734	DG
Faribault	2,792	77.69%	611	17.00%	16	0.45%	165	4.59%	10	0.28%	2,181	60.68%	3,594	FA
Fillmore	3,242	80.15%	554	13.70%	75	1.85%	120	2.97%	54	1.33%	2,688	66.45%	4,045	FI
Freeborn	2,876	78.19%	461	12.53%	95	2.58%	207	5.63%	39	1.06%	2,415	65.66%	3,678	FB
Goodhue	4,562	83.43%	735	13.44%	37	0.68%	100	1.83%	34	0.62%	3,827	69.99%	5,468	GH
Grant	1,209	87.67%	102	7.40%	12	0.87%	47	3.41%	9	0.65%	1,107	80.28%	1,379	GR
Hennepin	31,437	73.71%	5,708	13.38%	4,445	10.42%	711	1.67%	347	0.81%	25,729	60.33%	42,648	HN
Houston	1,546	76.12%	434	21.37%	12	0.59%	31	1.53%	8	0.39%	1,112	54.75%	2,031	HS
Hubbard	1,392	79.95%	232	13.33%	76	4.37%	23	1.32%	18	1.03%	1,160	66.63%	1,741	HU
Isanti	1,603	84.06%	137	7.18%	76	3.99%	71	3.72%	20	1.05%	1,466	76.87%	1,907	IS
Itasca	1,796	77.02%	293	12.56%	167	7.16%	28	1.20%	48	2.06%	1,503	64.45%	2,332	IT
Jackson	2,032	76.08%	554	20.74%	22	0.82%	33	1.24%	30	1.12%	1,478	55.34%	2,671	JK
Kanabec	872	86.08%	106	10.46%	8	0.79%	20	1.97%	7	0.69%	766	75.62%	1,013	KA
Kandiyohi	2,576	81.26%	252	7.95%	99	3.12%	81	2.56%	162	5.11%	2,324	73.31%	3,170	KD
Kittson	1,076	81.27%	157	11.86%	15	1.13%	60	4.53%	16	1.21%	919	69.41%	1,324	KI
Lac qui Parle	1,886	83.27%	243	10.73%	14	0.62%	91	4.02%	31	1.37%	1,643	72.54%	2,265	LQ
Lake	603	67.45%	77	8.61%	194	21.70%	7	0.78%	13	1.45%	409 (Note: In this county where Debs ran second ahead of Parker, margin given is Roosevlt vote minus Debs vote and percentage margin Roosevelt percentage minus Debs percentage.)	45.75%	894	LK
Le Sueur	2,086	59.19%	1,251	35.50%	107	3.04%	55	1.56%	25	0.71%	835	23.69%	3,524	LS
Lincoln	1,323	79.70%	258	15.54%	10	0.60%	52	3.13%	17	1.02%	1,065	64.16%	1,660	LN
Lyon	2,394	81.82%	330	11.28%	50	1.71%	100	3.42%	52	1.78%	2,064	70.54%	2,926	LY
Marshall	1,720	76.38%	275	12.21%	63	2.80%	132	5.86%	62	2.75%	1,445	64.17%	2,252	MH
Martin	2,167	70.66%	656	21.39%	55	1.79%	168	5.48%	21	0.68%	1,511	49.27%	3,067	MT
McLeod	1,478	62.10%	793	33.32%	22	0.92%	74	3.11%	13	0.55%	685	28.78%	2,380	MD
Meeker	2,327	73.85%	692	21.96%	31	0.98%	79	2.51%	22	0.70%	1,635	51.89%	3,151	MK
Mille Lacs	1,451	83.87%	154	8.90%	50	2.89%	59	3.41%	16	0.92%	1,297	74.97%	1,730	ML
Morrison	2,498	66.74%	1,128	30.14%	42	1.12%	48	1.28%	27	0.72%	1,370	36.60%	3,743	MR
Mower	2,769	77.50%	552	15.45%	153	4.28%	75	2.10%	24	0.67%	2,217	62.05%	3,573	MO
Murray	1,464	70.86%	537	25.99%	14	0.68%	27	1.31%	24	1.16%	927	44.87%	2,066	MU
Nicollet	1,677	74.04%	513	22.65%	12	0.53%	56	2.47%	7	0.31%	1,164	51.39%	2,265	NI
Nobles	1,732	70.52%	622	25.33%	12	0.49%	68	2.77%	22	0.90%	1,110	45.20%	2,456	NO
Norman	1,782	78.02%	161	7.05%	173	7.57%	125	5.47%	43	1.88%	1,609	70.45%	2,284	NR
Olmsted	2,745	68.54%	1,140	28.46%	15	0.37%	87	2.17%	18	0.45%	1,605	40.07%	4,005	OL
Otter Tail	4,642	73.69%	869	13.80%	367	5.83%	278	4.41%	143	2.27%	3,773	59.90%	6,299	OT
Pine	1,743	74.23%	463	19.72%	93	3.96%	34	1.45%	15	0.64%	1,280	54.51%	2,348	PN
Pipestone	1,185	76.16%	269	17.29%	35	2.25%	39	2.51%	28	1.80%	916	58.87%	1,556	PS
Polk	3,549	71.71%	696	14.06%	357	7.21%	242	4.89%	105	2.12%	2,853	57.65%	4,949	PL
Pope	1,729	88.17%	159	8.11%	8	0.41%	45	2.29%	20	1.02%	1,570	80.06%	1,961	PO
Ramsey	18,269	70.22%	5,860	22.52%	1,450	5.57%	221	0.85%	218	0.84%	12,409	47.69%	26,018	RM
Red Lake	1,430	68.00%	399	18.97%	164	7.80%	46	2.19%	64	3.04%	1,031	49.03%	2,103	RL
Redwood	2,194	79.64%	462	16.77%	16	0.58%	64	2.32%	19	0.69%	1,732	62.87%	2,755	RW
Renville	2,925	77.94%	639	17.03%	20	0.53%	124	3.30%	45	1.20%	2,286	60.91%	3,753	RV
Rice	3,160	71.36%	1,063	24.01%	110	2.48%	58	1.31%	37	0.84%	2,097	47.36%	4,428	RC
Rock	1,243	79.12%	241	15.34%	23	1.46%	42	2.67%	22	1.40%	1,002	63.78%	1,571	RK
Roseau	1,042	73.38%	182	12.82%	132	9.30%	38	2.68%	26	1.83%	860	60.56%	1,420	RS
Scott	1,138	51.99%	1,021	46.64%	18	0.82%	8	0.37%	4	0.18%	117	5.34%	2,189	SL
Sherburne	1,165	82.68%	186	13.20%	23	1.63%	21	1.49%	14	0.99%	979	69.48%	1,409	SC
Sibley	1,628	69.22%	662	28.15%	2	0.09%	48	2.04%	12	0.51%	966	41.07%	2,352	SB
St. Louis	10,375	77.74%	1,972	14.78%	609	4.56%	155	1.16%	234	1.75%	8,403	62.97%	13,345	SY
Stearns	2,849	50.43%	2,625	46.47%	85	1.50%	60	1.06%	30	0.53%	224	3.97%	5,649	ST
Steele	2,095	63.43%	1,067	32.30%	52	1.57%	72	2.18%	17	0.51%	1,028	31.12%	3,303	SE
Stevens	1,254	75.13%	362	21.69%	19	1.14%	23	1.38%	11	0.66%	892	53.45%	1,669	SV
Swift	1,784	76.37%	462	19.78%	14	0.60%	55	2.35%	21	0.90%	1,322	56.59%	2,336	SW
Todd	2,961	74.83%	741	18.73%	91	2.30%	132	3.34%	32	0.81%	2,220	56.10%	3,957	TD
Traverse	885	77.50%	247	21.63%	0	0.00%	10	0.88%	0	0.00%	638	55.87%	1,142	TR
Wabasha	2,315	66.14%	1,083	30.94%	28	0.80%	59	1.69%	15	0.43%	1,232	35.20%	3,500	WB
Wadena	1,159	82.55%	190	13.53%	25	1.78%	19	1.35%	11	0.78%	969	69.02%	1,404	WD
Waseca	1,714	70.13%	631	25.82%	22	0.90%	30	1.23%	47	1.92%	1,083	44.31%	2,444	WC
Washington	2,913	79.94%	652	17.89%	41	1.13%	17	0.47%	21	0.58%	2,261	62.05%	3,644	WA
Watonwan	1,455	79.95%	307	16.87%	6	0.33%	43	2.36%	9	0.49%	1,148	63.08%	1,820	WW
Wilkin	1,103	77.30%	246	17.24%	39	2.73%	31	2.17%	8	0.56%	857	60.06%	1,427	WK
Winona	3,734	61.22%	2,063	33.83%	110	1.80%	44	0.72%	148	2.43%	1,671	27.40%	6,099	WN
Wright	3,183	75.04%	860	20.27%	47	1.11%	126	2.97%	26	0.61%	2,323	54.76%	4,242	WR
Yellow Medicine	1,947	83.42%	258	11.05%	19	0.81%	96	4.11%	14	0.60%	1,689	72.37%	2,334	YM
Totals	216,651	73.98%	55,187	18.84%	11,692	3.99%	6,253	2.14%	3,077	1.05%	161,464	55.13%	292,860	MN

== See also ==
- United States presidential elections in Minnesota
