= Browns Creek Township, Red Lake County, Minnesota =

Browns Creek Township, Minnesota
- Township
- Location of Browns Creek Township, within Red Lake County, Minnesota
- Coordinates: 47°56′28″N 96°15′22″W
- Country: United States
- State: Minnesota
- County: Red Lake

Area
  - Total: 12.1 sq mi (31.3 km^{2})
  - Land: 12.1 sq mi (31.3 km^{2})
  - Water: 0 sq mi (0.0 km^{2})
- Elevation: 1,050 ft (320 m)

Population (2020)
  - Total: 41
  - Density: 3.4/sq mi (1.3/km^{2})
- Time zone: UTC-6 (Central (CST))
  - Summer (DST): UTC-5 (CDT)
- FIPS code: 27-08146
- GNIS feature ID: 0663681

Browns Creek Township is a township in Red Lake County, Minnesota, United States. The population was 41 at the 2020 census.

== Geography ==
According to the United States Census Bureau, the township has a total area of 12.1 square miles (31 km^{2}), all land.

== Demographics ==
As of the census of 2000, there were 58 people, 20 households, and 16 families residing in the township. The population density was 4.8 inhabitants per square mile (1.9/km^{2}). There were 20 housing units at an average density of 1.7 per square mile (0.66/km^{2}). The racial makeup of the township was 100.00% White. Hispanic or Latino of any race were 5.17% of the population.

There were 20 households, out of which 35.0% had children under the age of 18 living with them, 70.0% were married couples living together, and 20.0% were non-families. 20.0% of all households were made up of individuals, and 15.0% had someone living alone who was 65 years of age or older. The average household size was 2.90 and the average family size was 3.31.

In the township the population was spread out, with 27.6% under the age of 18, 13.8% from 18 to 24, 25.9% from 25 to 44, 20.7% from 45 to 64, and 12.1% who were 65 years of age or older. The median age was 35 years. For every 100 females, there were 152.2 males. For every 100 females age 18 and over, there were 133.3 males.

The median income for a household in the township was $43,125, and the median income for a family was $44,063. Males had a median income of $19,063 versus $20,625 for females. The per capita income for the township was $11,834. There were 21.1% of families and 23.9% of the population living below the poverty line, including 27.3% of under eighteens and 28.6% of those over 64.
