= 1920 United States presidential election in Minnesota =

- November 2, 1920
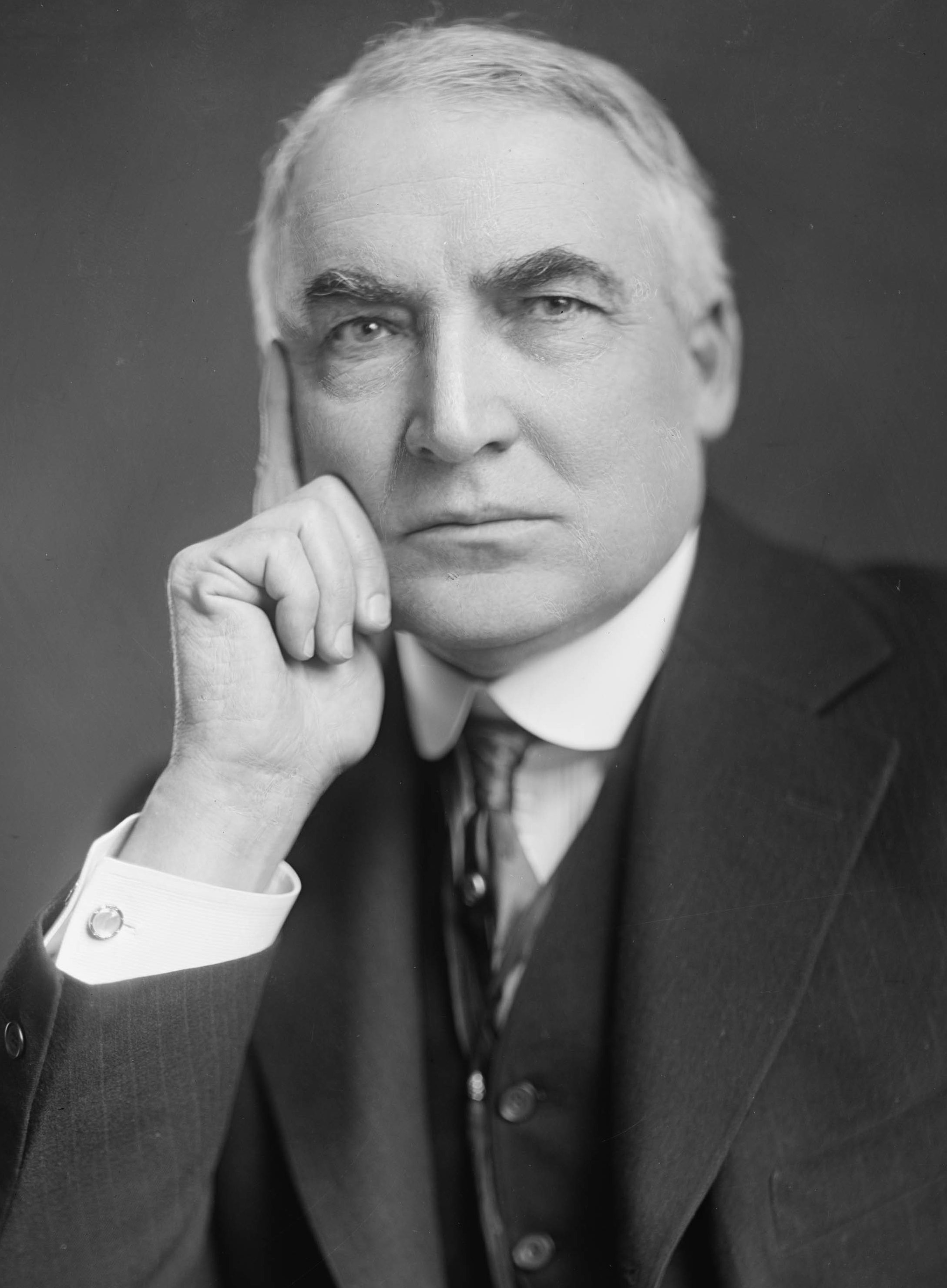

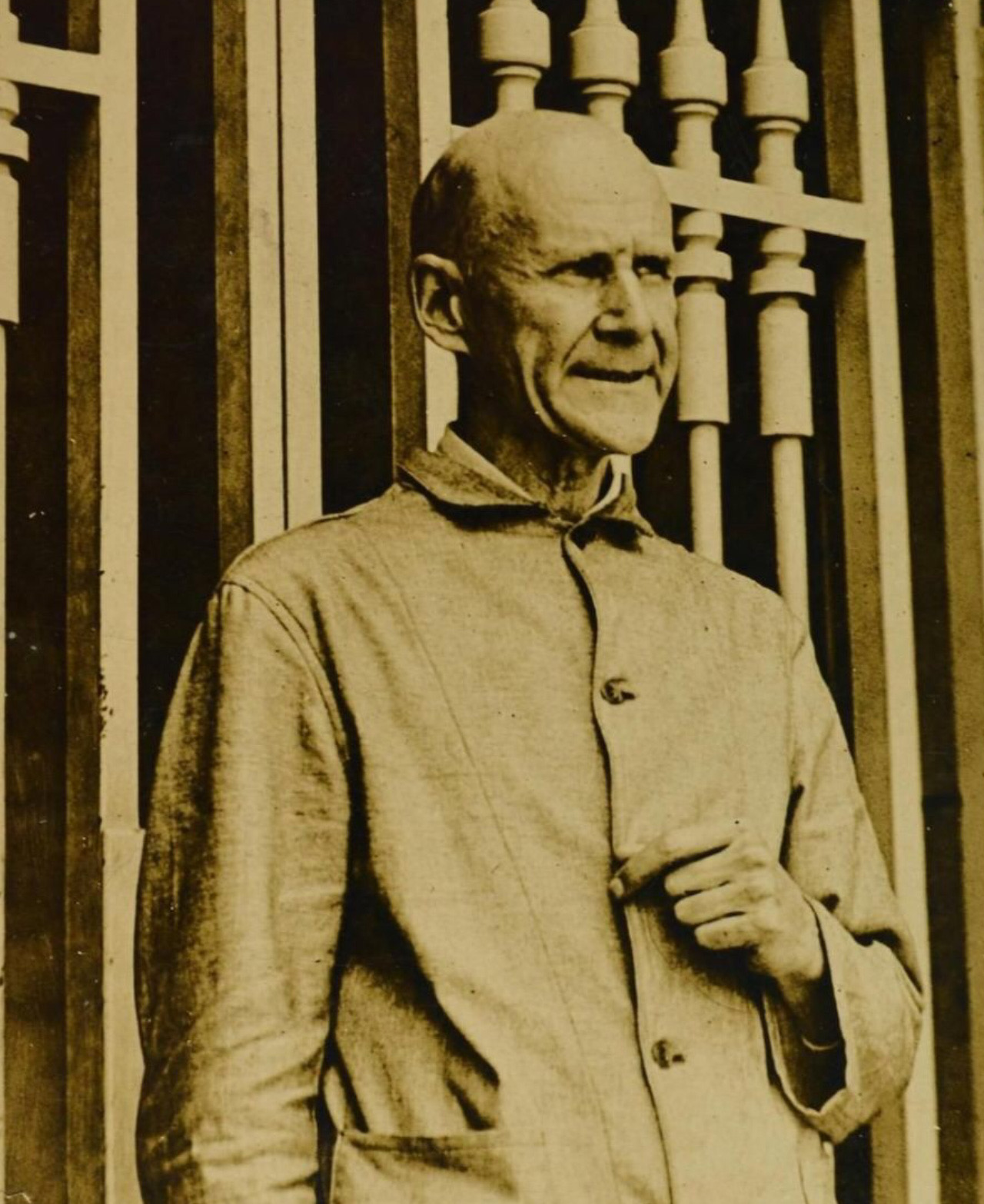
Nominee	Warren G. Harding	James M. Cox	Eugene V. Debs
Party	Republican	Democratic	Socialist
Home state	Ohio	Ohio	Indiana
Running mate	Calvin Coolidge	Franklin D. Roosevelt	Seymour Stedman
Electoral vote	12	0	0
Popular vote	519,421	142,994	56,106
Percentage	70.59%	19.43%	7.62%
County results
Harding
40–50%
50–60%
60–70%
70–80%
80–90%
President before election
Woodrow Wilson
Democratic
Elected President
Warren G. Harding
Republican

The 1920 United States presidential election in Minnesota took place on November 2, 1920, as part of the 1920 United States presidential election in which all contemporary forty-eight states participated. Voters chose 12 electors, or representatives to the Electoral College, who voted for president and vice president. This election marks the last time a candidate for president won every county in Minnesota.

The 1918 mid-term elections had seen the Midwestern farming community largely desert the Democratic Party due to supposed preferential treatment of Southern farmers: Democratic seats in the Midwest fell from thirty-four to seventeen, whilst Scandinavian-Americans were also vigorously opposed to entering the war. Moreover, Democratic fear of Communism seen in the Palmer Raids and "Red Scare" led to Cox, then Governor of Ohio, to ban German-language instruction in public schools in 1919. Much more critical for German-Americans was the view that outgoing President Woodrow Wilson was deliberately trying to punish Germany and Austria for starting the war, especially via his disregard for the United Kingdom's continuing blockade of Germany. Stressing Harding's German ancestry, the German press drummed up the view that

a vote for Harding is a vote against the persecutions suffered by German-Americans during the war.

As the campaign began after the Republican Party had nominated U.S. Senator Warren G. Harding of Ohio and the Democratic Party former Ohio governor James M. Cox, a further blow to the Democrats – who had never won Minnesota but came tantalizingly close in 1916 when they lost by one vote in 988 – occurred when the national economy suffered a major downturn following the wartime boom, resulting in plummeting agricultural prices that were especially problematic in the Midwest. Whereas Cox travelled throughout the nation apart from the "Solid South" during September, Harding, despite having four times the budget, campaigned from his home in Marion, Ohio. A poll by the giant Rexall drug store chain – which in 1916 had been accurate enough to predict Wilson's razor-thin wins in New Hampshire and California – suggested Harding would win 382 electoral votes, and at the end of October, although no more opinion polls had been published, most observers were even more convinced that the Republicans would take complete control of all branches of government.

== Results ==
1920 United States presidential election in Minnesota
Party	Candidate	Votes	Percentage	Electoral votes
Republican	Warren G. Harding	519,421	70.59%	12
Democratic	James M. Cox	142,994	19.43%	0
Socialist	Eugene V. Debs	56,106	7.62%	0
Prohibition	Aaron S. Watkins	11,489	1.56%	0
Socialist Labor	William Wesley Cox	5,828	0.79%	0
Totals		735,838	100.00%	12

=== Results by county ===
County	Warren Gamaliel Harding Republican		James Middleton Cox Democratic		Eugene Victor Debs Socialist		Aaron Sherman Watkins Prohibition		William Wesley Cox Socialist Labor		Margin		Total votes cast
County	#	%	#	%	#	%	#	%	#	%	#	%	Total votes cast
Aitkin	2,933	70.15%	613	14.66%	503	12.03%	89	2.13%	43	1.03%	2,320	55.49%	4,181
Anoka	3,505	72.13%	865	17.80%	391	8.05%	68	1.40%	30	0.62%	2,640	54.33%	4,859
Becker	4,811	75.78%	901	14.19%	436	6.87%	113	1.78%	88	1.39%	3,910	61.58%	6,349
Beltrami	4,518	61.26%	1,427	19.35%	1,215	16.47%	98	1.33%	117	1.59%	3,091	41.91%	7,375
Benton	2,920	78.83%	554	14.96%	169	4.56%	34	0.92%	27	0.73%	2,366	63.88%	3,704
Big Stone	2,415	78.16%	451	14.60%	127	4.11%	67	2.17%	30	0.97%	1,964	63.56%	3,090
Blue Earth	8,894	79.05%	1,974	17.55%	207	1.84%	117	1.04%	59	0.52%	6,920	61.51%	11,251
Brown	5,841	80.68%	796	10.99%	484	6.69%	50	0.69%	69	0.95%	5,045	69.68%	7,240
Carlton	2,833	59.47%	1,152	24.18%	654	13.73%	94	1.97%	31	0.65%	1,681	35.29%	4,764
Carver	5,073	87.31%	562	9.67%	84	1.45%	29	0.50%	62	1.07%	4,511	77.64%	5,810
Cass	3,242	70.51%	710	15.44%	494	10.74%	96	2.09%	56	1.22%	2,532	55.07%	4,598
Chippewa	3,532	69.75%	960	18.96%	355	7.01%	154	3.04%	63	1.24%	2,572	50.79%	5,064
Chisago	4,361	80.02%	484	8.88%	503	9.23%	69	1.27%	33	0.61%	3,877 (Note: In this county where Debs ran second ahead of James M. Cox, margin given is Harding vote minus Debs vote and percentage margin Harding percentage minus Debs percentage.)	70.79%	5,450
Clay	4,943	73.00%	1,335	19.72%	289	4.27%	126	1.86%	78	1.15%	3,608	53.29%	6,771
Clearwater	1,788	70.73%	340	13.45%	298	11.79%	62	2.45%	40	1.58%	1,448	57.28%	2,528
Cook	467	72.85%	98	15.29%	58	9.05%	13	2.03%	5	0.78%	369	57.57%	641
Cottonwood	3,882	86.27%	451	10.02%	90	2.00%	54	1.20%	23	0.51%	3,431	76.24%	4,500
Crow Wing	5,262	70.34%	1,077	14.40%	933	12.47%	122	1.63%	87	1.16%	4,185	55.94%	7,481
Dakota	5,373	66.45%	2,190	27.08%	395	4.88%	78	0.96%	50	0.62%	3,183	39.36%	8,086
Dodge	3,386	83.40%	516	12.71%	72	1.77%	68	1.67%	18	0.44%	2,870	70.69%	4,060
Douglas	4,428	66.13%	733	10.95%	647	9.66%	824	12.31%	64	0.96%	3,604 (Note: In this county where Watkins ran ahead of James M. Cox, margin given is Harding vote minus Watkins vote and percentage margin Harding percentage minus Watkins percentage.)	53.82%	6,696
Faribault	6,687	86.01%	869	11.18%	102	1.31%	90	1.16%	27	0.35%	5,818	74.83%	7,775
Fillmore	7,341	85.92%	899	10.52%	125	1.46%	145	1.70%	34	0.40%	6,442	75.40%	8,544
Freeborn	6,772	81.96%	1,131	13.69%	138	1.67%	166	2.01%	56	0.68%	5,641	68.27%	8,263
Goodhue	9,330	85.07%	1,118	10.19%	304	2.77%	180	1.64%	36	0.33%	8,212	74.87%	10,968
Grant	2,427	75.80%	533	16.65%	106	3.31%	106	3.31%	30	0.94%	1,894	59.15%	3,202
Hennepin	90,517	64.58%	28,911	20.63%	18,800	13.41%	1,262	0.90%	679	0.48%	61,606	43.95%	140,169
Houston	4,101	85.67%	598	12.49%	36	0.75%	41	0.86%	11	0.23%	3,503	73.18%	4,787
Hubbard	2,238	73.84%	453	14.95%	237	7.82%	70	2.31%	33	1.09%	1,785	58.89%	3,031
Isanti	3,007	67.57%	405	9.10%	898	20.18%	113	2.54%	27	0.61%	2,602	47.39%	4,450
Itasca	3,973	58.31%	1,930	28.33%	738	10.83%	80	1.17%	92	1.35%	2,043	29.99%	6,813
Jackson	4,313	83.62%	715	13.86%	75	1.45%	29	0.56%	26	0.50%	3,598	69.76%	5,158
Kanabec	2,436	75.68%	332	10.31%	380	11.80%	41	1.27%	30	0.93%	2,104	63.87%	3,219
Kandiyohi	4,759	63.67%	1,282	17.15%	718	9.61%	613	8.20%	102	1.36%	3,477	46.52%	7,474
Kittson	2,485	74.65%	599	17.99%	175	5.26%	44	1.32%	26	0.78%	1,886	56.65%	3,329
Koochiching	1,786	55.29%	859	26.59%	485	15.02%	48	1.49%	52	1.61%	927	28.70%	3,230
Lac qui Parle	4,219	82.29%	653	12.74%	107	2.09%	103	2.01%	45	0.88%	3,566	69.55%	5,127
Lake	990	40.93%	594	24.56%	757	31.29%	59	2.44%	19	0.79%	396	9.63%	2,419
Le Sueur	4,059	66.22%	1,853	30.23%	112	1.83%	54	0.88%	52	0.85%	2,206	35.99%	6,130
Lincoln	2,548	75.30%	673	19.89%	81	2.39%	45	1.33%	37	1.09%	1,875	55.41%	3,384
Lyon	4,557	73.16%	1,232	19.78%	246	3.95%	153	2.46%	41	0.66%	3,325	53.38%	6,229
Mahnomen	1,076	71.97%	215	14.38%	167	11.17%	14	0.94%	23	1.54%	861	57.59%	1,495
Marshall	4,738	75.41%	885	14.09%	456	7.26%	139	2.21%	65	1.03%	3,853	61.32%	6,283
Martin	5,142	78.46%	1,221	18.63%	101	1.54%	66	1.01%	24	0.37%	3,921	59.83%	6,554
McLeod	5,430	77.62%	1,139	16.28%	263	3.76%	92	1.32%	72	1.03%	4,291	61.34%	6,996
Meeker	4,693	78.40%	878	14.67%	223	3.73%	123	2.05%	69	1.15%	3,815	63.73%	5,986
Mille Lacs	3,521	73.17%	526	10.93%	640	13.30%	84	1.75%	41	0.85%	2,995	59.87%	4,812
Morrison	5,371	77.57%	1,131	16.33%	316	4.56%	64	0.92%	42	0.61%	4,240	61.24%	6,924
Mower	6,339	82.06%	1,061	13.73%	192	2.49%	78	1.01%	55	0.71%	5,278	68.32%	7,725
Murray	3,270	79.16%	698	16.90%	102	2.47%	39	0.94%	22	0.53%	2,572	62.26%	4,131
Nicollet	4,115	83.45%	556	11.28%	140	2.84%	101	2.05%	19	0.39%	3,559	72.18%	4,931
Nobles	4,420	79.64%	982	17.69%	81	1.46%	38	0.68%	29	0.52%	3,438	61.95%	5,550
Norman	3,451	74.17%	481	10.34%	481	10.34%	175	3.76%	65	1.40%	2,970	63.83%	4,653
Olmsted	7,130	77.12%	1,756	18.99%	176	1.90%	145	1.57%	38	0.41%	5,374	58.13%	9,245
Otter Tail	11,084	78.50%	1,741	12.33%	788	5.58%	336	2.38%	170	1.20%	9,343	66.17%	14,119
Pennington	2,320	60.70%	768	20.09%	581	15.20%	95	2.49%	58	1.52%	1,552	40.61%	3,822
Pine	3,879	66.83%	1,127	19.42%	654	11.27%	86	1.48%	58	1.00%	2,752	47.42%	5,804
Pipestone	3,106	79.89%	490	12.60%	232	5.97%	35	0.90%	25	0.64%	2,616	67.28%	3,888
Polk	8,197	69.47%	2,111	17.89%	1,057	8.96%	288	2.44%	147	1.25%	6,086	51.58%	11,800
Pope	3,466	76.34%	709	15.62%	163	3.59%	167	3.68%	35	0.77%	2,757	60.73%	4,540
Ramsey	40,204	58.62%	21,110	30.78%	6,201	9.04%	504	0.73%	568	0.83%	19,094	27.84%	68,587
Red Lake	1,308	62.37%	558	26.61%	159	7.58%	44	2.10%	28	1.34%	750	35.77%	2,097
Redwood	5,589	83.07%	880	13.08%	159	2.36%	64	0.95%	36	0.54%	4,709	69.99%	6,728
Renville	5,995	73.64%	1,283	15.76%	478	5.87%	299	3.67%	86	1.06%	4,712	57.88%	8,141
Rice	6,500	74.58%	2,040	23.41%	72	0.83%	61	0.70%	42	0.48%	4,460	51.18%	8,715
Rock	3,121	84.53%	442	11.97%	67	1.81%	31	0.84%	31	0.84%	2,679	72.56%	3,692
Roseau	2,387	64.13%	500	13.43%	698	18.75%	90	2.42%	47	1.26%	1,887	45.38%	3,722
Saint Louis	27,987	56.98%	14,767	30.07%	5,378	10.95%	533	1.09%	450	0.92%	13,220	26.92%	49,115
Scott	3,015	68.96%	1,253	28.66%	52	1.19%	24	0.55%	28	0.64%	1,762	40.30%	4,372
Sherburne	2,747	85.18%	307	9.52%	115	3.57%	37	1.15%	19	0.59%	2,440	75.66%	3,225
Sibley	4,198	85.94%	502	10.28%	111	2.27%	50	1.02%	24	0.49%	3,696	75.66%	4,885
Stearns	13,566	86.33%	1,616	10.28%	318	2.02%	106	0.67%	108	0.69%	11,950	76.05%	15,714
Steele	4,243	76.45%	1,167	21.03%	56	1.01%	55	0.99%	29	0.52%	3,076	55.42%	5,550
Stevens	2,339	79.83%	457	15.60%	71	2.42%	47	1.60%	16	0.55%	1,882	64.23%	2,930
Swift	3,553	70.22%	985	19.47%	209	4.13%	260	5.14%	53	1.05%	2,568	50.75%	5,060
Todd	5,448	71.10%	1,464	19.11%	443	5.78%	191	2.49%	116	1.51%	3,984	52.00%	7,662
Traverse	1,759	73.20%	550	22.89%	49	2.04%	18	0.75%	27	1.12%	1,209	50.31%	2,403
Wabasha	4,907	77.11%	1,275	20.03%	78	1.23%	44	0.69%	60	0.94%	3,632	57.07%	6,364
Wadena	2,635	75.57%	503	14.43%	203	5.82%	86	2.47%	60	1.72%	2,132	61.14%	3,487
Waseca	3,626	71.79%	1,257	24.89%	102	2.02%	37	0.73%	29	0.57%	2,369	46.90%	5,051
Washington	5,852	74.84%	1,558	19.93%	267	3.41%	96	1.23%	46	0.59%	4,294	54.92%	7,819
Watonwan	3,510	81.40%	647	15.00%	100	2.32%	31	0.72%	24	0.56%	2,863	66.40%	4,312
Wilkin	2,106	75.19%	561	20.03%	76	2.71%	39	1.39%	19	0.68%	1,545	55.16%	2,801
Winona	7,888	69.81%	2,896	25.63%	271	2.40%	80	0.71%	165	1.46%	4,992	44.18%	11,300
Wright	7,013	79.51%	1,299	14.73%	303	3.44%	133	1.51%	72	0.82%	5,714	64.78%	8,820
Yellow Medicine	4,225	72.48%	814	13.96%	233	4.00%	497	8.53%	60	1.03%	3,411	58.52%	5,829
Totals	519,421	70.59%	142,994	19.43%	56,106	7.62%	11,489	1.56%	5,828	0.79%	376,427	51.16%	735,838

== Analysis ==
Harding overwhelmingly carried Minnesota by a margin of 376,427 votes, or 51.16 points, and nationally won the election, with 404 electoral votes and a 26.17-point lead over Cox in the popular vote, which constitutes the most lopsided result in any United States presidential election held since James Monroe's uncontested re-election in 1820. Cox did not win a single state north of the Mason-Dixon line nor west of the Continental Divide. The percentage of Minnesota's popular vote won by Harding in 1920 is second only to Theodore Roosevelt's 74% of the state's popular vote from 1904, as Harding was helped by mass defection of registered Democratic German-Americans to the Republican ticket.

Harding became the second and last presidential nominee after Theodore Roosevelt in 1904 to sweep all of Minnesota's counties. This was the last time the Republicans won Red Lake County until George W. Bush in 2000 and the last time Mahnomen County voted Republican until Ronald Reagan in 1980.

The presidential election of 1920 is also noteworthy for the third party candidacy of the perennial Socialist candidate, Eugene V. Debs. Debs won nearly a million votes nationally, and 7.62 percent in Minnesota with second place ahead of Cox in six counties, despite the fact that he was incarcerated at the time. On September 12, 1918, Debs had been convicted on ten counts of sedition in relation to a speech he had given in Canton, Ohio on June 16, 1918, in which he encouraged conscientious objection to World War I. Of the five presidential elections in which Debs had been a candidate, 1920 was his second-greatest showing in terms of percentage of the popular vote won — he only did better in 1912. 1920 was also his final appearance on the ballot.

== See also ==
- United States presidential elections in Minnesota
