= Red Lake River =

Red Lake River Rivière du Lac Rouge
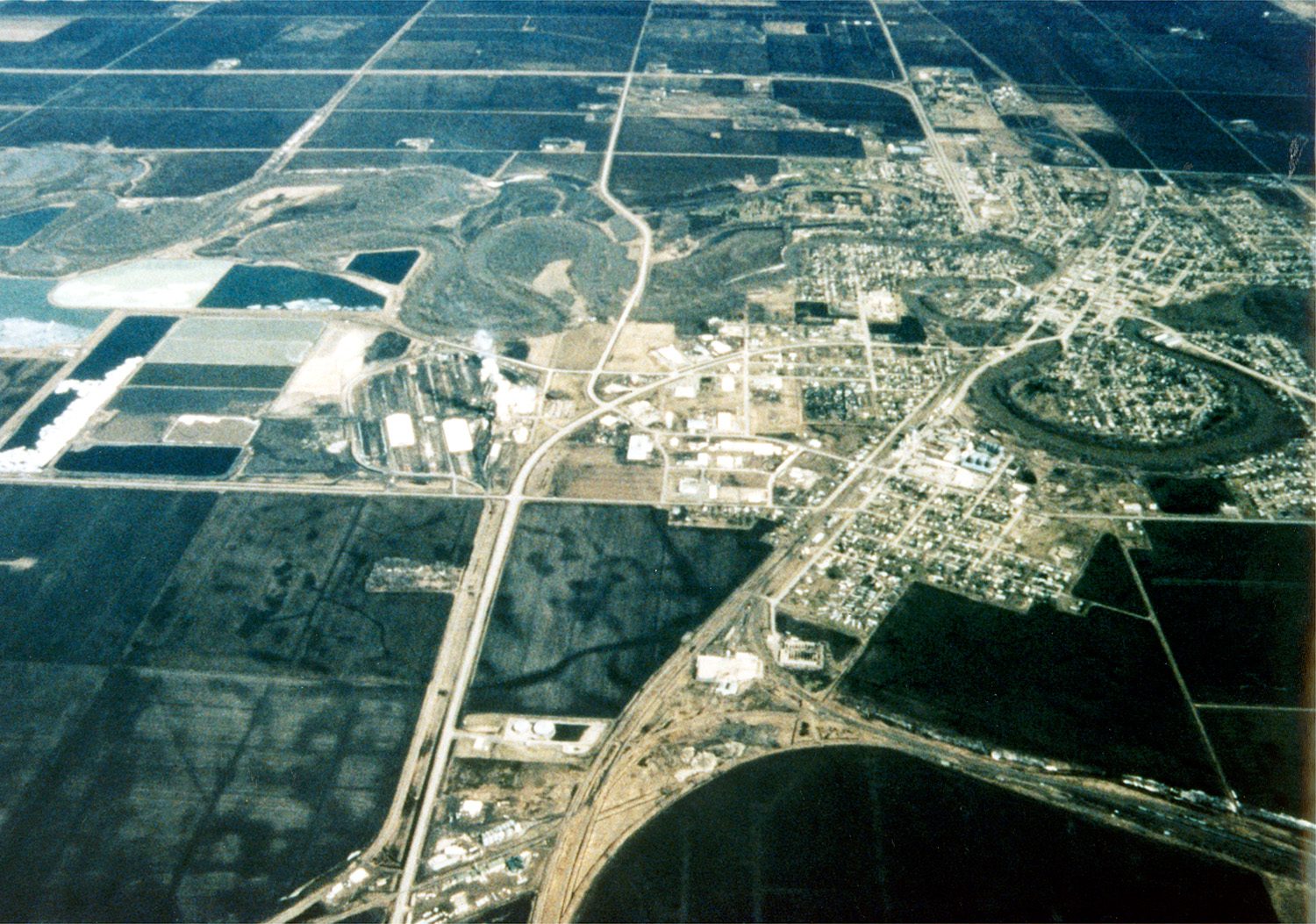
- The Red Lake River on its crooked path through Crookston, Minnesota

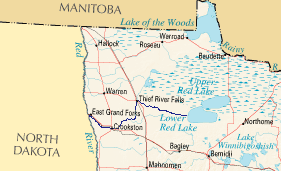
- Northwest Minnesota with the Red Lake River highlighted

- Mouth of the Red Lake River
- Native name: Miskwaagamiiwi-zaaga'iganiiwi-ziibi (Ojibwe)

Location
- Country: United States
- State: Minnesota
- County: Polk County, Red Lake County, Pennington County, Clearwater County, Beltrami County

Physical characteristics
- Source
  - location: Lower Red Lake
  - coordinates: 47.9596794°N 95.2744491°W
- Mouth: Red River of the North
  - location: East Grand Forks
  - coordinates: 47.9225°N 97.0214°W
- Length: 193 miles (311 km)

Basin features
- River system: Red River of the North

The Red Lake River (French: Rivière du Lac Rouge; Ojibwe: Miskwaagamiiwi-zaaga'iganiiwi-ziibi) is a river located in northwestern Minnesota. The river begins on the western side of the Lower Red Lake and flows westward. After passing through Thief River Falls, Red Lake Falls, and Crookston, the river merges with the Red River of the North in East Grand Forks. The total length of the river is 193 miles (311 km) The term "Forks" in Grand Forks comes from this forking (confluence) of the Red and Red Lake rivers near downtown Grand Forks.

As a tributary of the Red River, the Red Lake River contributed to the heavy flooding of Greater Grand Forks in 1997. The river also caused damage in its own right, albeit less severe, in Crookston.

== Terrain ==
The Red Lake River covers a wide variety of terrain. After leaving the Red Lake, the river flows through a marsh in the Red Lake Indian Reservation. The river then flows through a prairie and, then, through farmland. Afterward, at St. Hilaire the sides of the river grow steeper, becoming large eroding cliffs. Some parts of the riverbanks are thickly forested.

The river is relatively smooth for most of the trip. There is a stretch between St. Hilaire and Crookston where there is a chain of rapids, which are easily navigated.

== Recreation ==
The Red Lake River is one of the few Minnesota state canoe routes in the area. There are a number of rest areas and camping facilities along the route. The Red Lake River is a popular source of recreation for area residents, and many enjoy the tubing and canoeing the river makes possible.

== Dams ==
The Minnesota State Department of Natural Resources (MN DNR) website (see References section) describing the nature of the river mentions three dams on the river (note that this is not to be taken as the total number of dams and/or structures located on this river):

- At river mile 181
- City of Red Lake Falls (dam owned by Otter Tail Power Company)
- City of Crookston (dam owned by Otter Tail Power Company)

Note: The Otter Tail Power Company site does not list the above two dams as a source of hydropower.

== See also ==
The Red Lake River is the second longest river that is entirely within the state of Minnesota, after the Minnesota River which is the longest.

- List of rivers of Minnesota
- List of longest streams of Minnesota
