= Huot, Minnesota =

Huot
- Unincorporated community
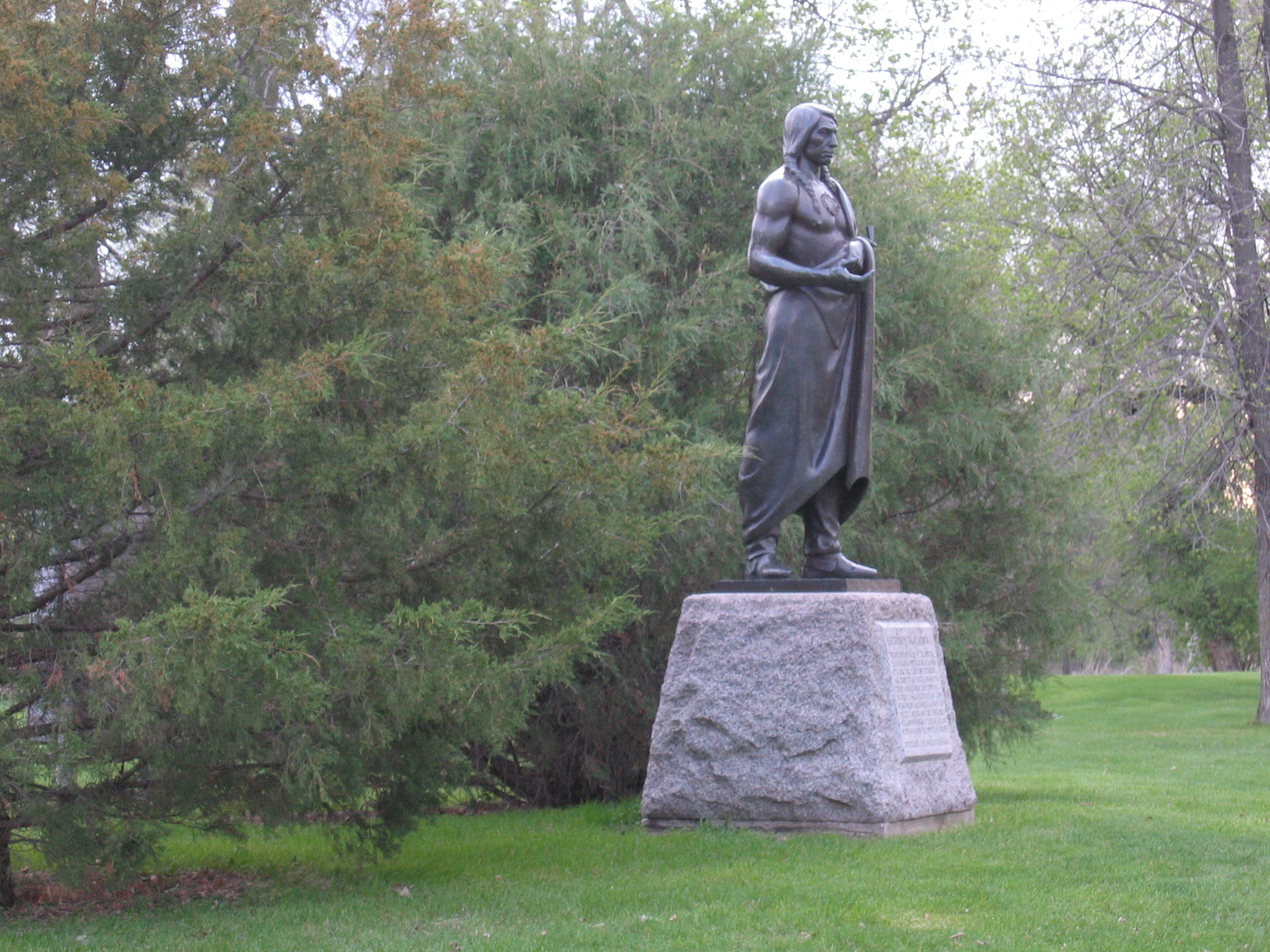
- Old Crossing Treaty Monument, Huot, Minnesota

- Location within Minnesota Location within the United States
- Coordinates: 47°51′55″N 96°25′24″W
- Country: United States
- State: Minnesota
- County: Red Lake
- Elevation: 906 ft (276 m)
- Time zone: UTC-6 (Central (CST))
  - Summer (DST): UTC-5 (CDT)
- Area code: 218
- GNIS feature ID: 654761

Huot is an unincorporated community in Louisville Township, Red Lake County, Minnesota, United States. The name of the community evokes the French-Canadian and Métis history of the Red River Trails and the Pembina settlements of Assiniboia.

== History ==
The location of Huot was originally dubbed the Old Crossing. In the 1840s and 1850s, this was a ford or crossing of the Red Lake River used by Red River ox cart trains en route from Pembina and Fort Garry in the Red River Colony to St. Paul, Minnesota. After negotiating the difficult and sometimes dangerous crossing, these cart trains typically camped overnight nearby, and the location became known as a regular stopping place on the "Woods Trail".

In the 1850s, Joe Rolette, one of the colorful promoters of trade between British Assiniboia and St. Paul, established a trading house at the Old Crossing. Rolette also proposed to establish a city named "Douglas" at the same location. Rolette's compatriots in the Minnesota state legislature actually designated Douglas the county seat of Polk County in 1858. This designation was quickly withdrawn when the Ojibwe, who had been contesting the Dakota Sioux for hunting rights in the vicinity over many decades, refused to grant permission for a ferry or a town in their territory.

Not coincidentally, the Old Crossing soon became the situs of the Treaties of Old Crossing, whereby the Ojibwe were induced to cede most of northwestern Minnesota to the United States. This cession was originally to be consummated at Old Crossing in September 1862, but events of the Dakota War of 1862 intervened. A large contingent of Ojibwe chiefs and their family members were encamped at Grand Forks several miles below Old Crossing, when hostilities of the Dakota War of 1862 spread to the Red River Valley. The Ojibwe remained calm while panic swept through the nearby white settlements and outlying farms and trading posts, but the United States treaty negotiators fled to safety at Fort Abercrombie. The Ojibwe treaty negotiations were postponed to the following year until the Sioux were subdued. Eventually, the Treaty of Old Crossing (1863) and the Treaty of Old Crossing (1864) were consummated and signed at the site of the Old Crossing.

After the land was opened to non-native settlement in the early 1870s, a Métis contemporary of Joe Rolette, Pierre Bottineau, promoted immigration to the Red Lake River area by French-Canadian settlers. A substantial French-Canadian farming community developed nearby in what later became Red Lake County. One of these settlers, Louis Huot, arrived from Quebec in 1876. He established a ferry at the Old Crossing, just below the Black River, in 1877. The resulting village site and surrounding Louisville Township both were named after Louis Huot. As the neighborhood was homesteaded by other farmers, the village grew to include a Catholic church, a school, general store, a creamery (which later became the town hall) and a post office, as well as several houses. A bridge was built across the river, replacing the ferry, around 1900.

Following a brief period of prosperity, the town of Huot began to decline after the Northern Pacific Railroad bypassed Huot and much of the business and trade activity of Louisville Township moved to the town of Dorothy, about 5 miles (8.0 km) north. The church building (St. Aloysius) was relocated to Dorothy in 1919, while the cemetery was left in its original location, where it still remains in use. The post office (operated in the Huot store) was discontinued in 1936. The old creamery building burned in 1940, and the town meetings were moved to the school house. In 1966 the bridge collapsed and later that year, the school house was burned down by vandals. Huot Store continued in operation for a few more years, but in 2008, Huot is barely recognized or ascertainable as a village. The tiny community appears by name on some maps as the site of the Old Crossing Treaty Park.

== Parks and recreation ==
The Old Crossing Treaty Park in Huot was established on an 8.8-acre (36,000 m^{2}) on the west bank of the Old Crossing site in 1933, and a memorial to the 1863 Treaty of Old Crossing was erected there on June 25, 1933. At about the same time, an additional 100 acres (0.4 km^{2}) on the north side of the river, which included portions of the old Pembina Trail, was acquired by citizens of Polk and Red Lake counties. Today the park includes picnicking facilities, seasonal historical exhibits, a boat landing and the monument to the Ojibwe treaties and Red River cart trails. It is managed by Red Lake County. *

== Cultural events ==
www.frenchcanadianafran.org

The annual Old Crossing Chautauqua and French-Canadian/Metis Festival is a three-day event held at Huot and is sponsored by AFRAN (Association of the French of the North). The event happens the fourth weekend of August. The AFRAN mission is to create an understanding of the world's French heritage through the arts and humanities. See the website http://www.frenchcanadianafran.org/ *

See * for a description of several sites associated with Huot on the Red Lake County history tour.

== See also ==
Treaty of Old Crossing
