= Louisville Township, Red Lake County, Minnesota =

Louisville Township, Minnesota
- Township
- Location of Louisville Township, within Red Lake County, Minnesota

- Location within the state of Minnesota Louisville Township, Minnesota (the United States)
- Coordinates: 47°53′28″N 96°25′10″W
- Country: United States
- State: Minnesota
- County: Red Lake

Area
  - Total: 36.1 sq mi (93.4 km^{2})
  - Land: 36.1 sq mi (93.4 km^{2})
  - Water: 0.039 sq mi (0.1 km^{2})
- Elevation: 978 ft (298 m)

Population (2000)
  - Total: 192
  - Density: 5.4/sq mi (2.1/km^{2})
- Time zone: UTC-6 (Central (CST))
  - Summer (DST): UTC-5 (CDT)
- FIPS code: 27-38276
- GNIS feature ID: 0664828

Louisville Township is a township in Red Lake County, Minnesota, United States. The population was 171 at the 2020 census.

== Geography ==
According to the United States Census Bureau, the township has a total area of 36.1 square miles (93.4 km^{2}), of which 36.0 square miles (93.4 km^{2}) is land and 0.04 square mile (0.1 km^{2}) (0.06%) is water.

== Demographics ==
As of the census of 2000, there were 192 people, 75 households, and 51 families residing in the township. The population density was 5.3 inhabitants per square mile (2.0/km^{2}). There were 79 housing units at an average density of 2.2 per square mile (0.85/km^{2}). The racial makeup of the township was 100.00% White. Hispanic or Latino of any race were 0.52% of the population.

There were 75 households, out of which 33.3% had children under the age of 18 living with them, 65.3% were married couples living together, 4.0% had a female householder with no husband present, and 30.7% were non-families. 28.0% of all households were made up of individuals, and 9.3% had someone living alone who was 65 years of age or older. The average household size was 2.56 and the average family size was 3.21.

In the township the population was spread out, with 29.7% under the age of 18, 4.7% from 18 to 24, 28.6% from 25 to 44, 24.0% from 45 to 64, and 13.0% who were 65 years of age or older. The median age was 39 years. For every 100 females, there were 113.3 males. For every 100 females age 18 and over, there were 101.5 males.

The median income for a household in the township was $41,071, and the median income for a family was $42,188. Males had a median income of $31,750 versus $18,750 for females. The per capita income for the township was $16,805. None of the families and 2.0% of the population were living below the poverty line.

== History ==
Louisville Township was settled as part of a colony of immigrants from Quebec introduced by promoter Pierre Bottineau in the 1870s. It was organized in 1879 and named after an early settler, Louis Huot, whose last name also was affixed to a small settlement within the township known as Huot. A large percentage of the township population was French or French-Canadian. The primary economic activity has always been agriculture. The townsite of Dorothy and the Old Crossing Treaty State Park at Huot are the only non-agricultural features of the township.
