= Pierre Bottineau House =

Historic house museum in Maple Grove, Minnesota

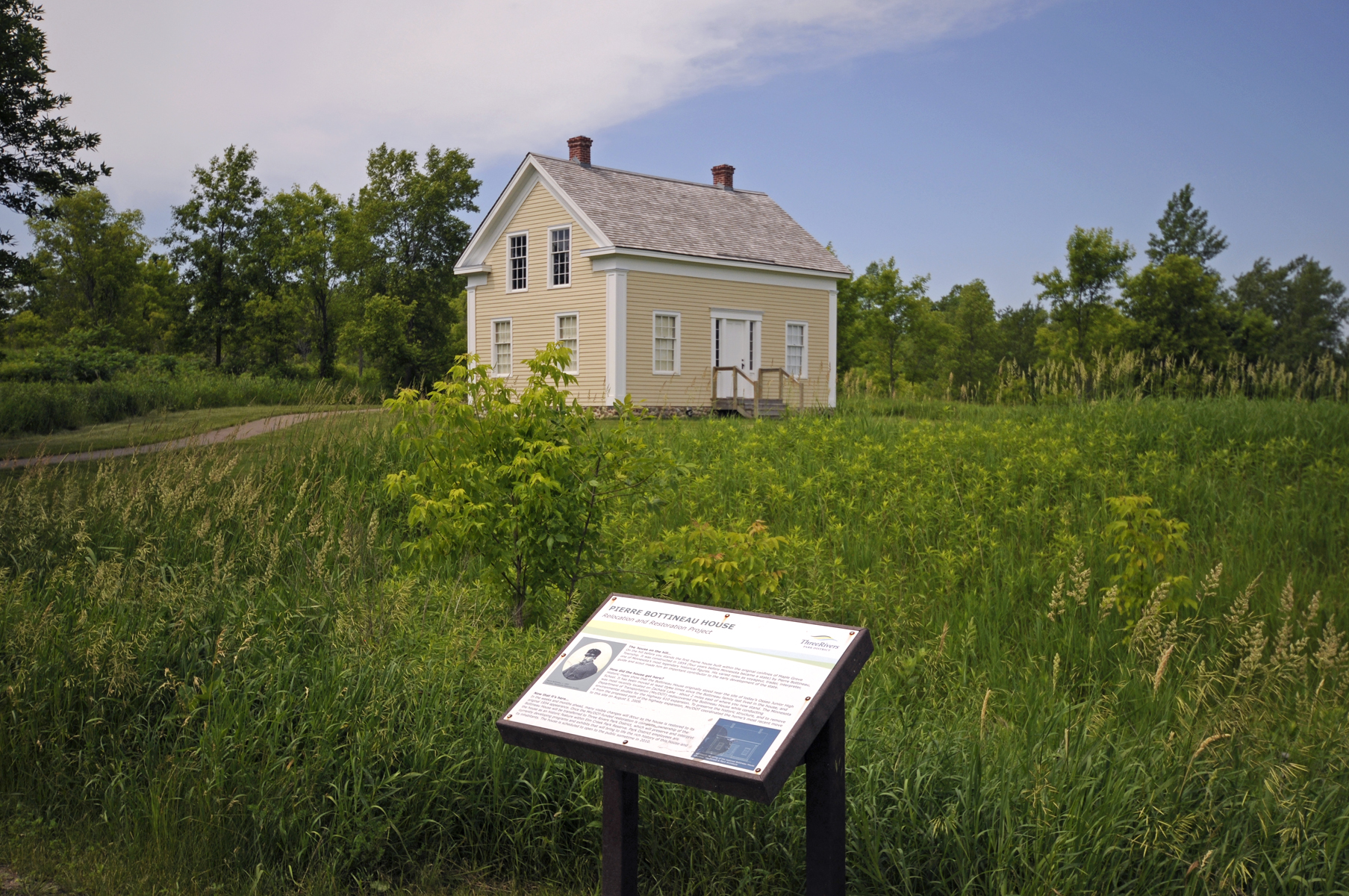
- House Exterior - from Trail showing wayside signage
- Established: 2009 (House built circa 1854)
- Location: 12600 James Deane Pkwy; Maple Grove, Minnesota 55369; USA
- Coordinates: 45.13531°N 93.442825°W
- Type: Historic house museum
- Website: website

The Pierre Bottineau House is a historic frame house in Maple Grove, Minnesota, now located in Elm Creek Park Reserve and used as an interpretive site. It dates to the 1850s and connects to the life of guide and settler Pierre Bottineau and to early European American settlement in the area.

== Building History ==
Pierre Bottineau built the house in 1854 on land that later became part of Maple Grove and Osseo, in an area once known as Bottineau's Prairie. He was Métis, the son of an Ojibwe mother and a French Canadian father, and the house reflects his role in early settlement and regional trade networks. The structure served as his family home and housed some of his many children from two marriages.

In 1908 owners converted the building into a granary, which changed its function but kept the basic structure in use. Later preservation efforts led to its restoration as a historic house that interprets the lives of early settlers in Hennepin County.

The house stood at several locations as residents and preservation groups moved it to protect it from demolition and to place it in a setting close to its original environment. In 2009 it was moved to Elm Creek Park Reserve near the chalet, where it opened as a public site under Three Rivers Park District.

== Architecture ==
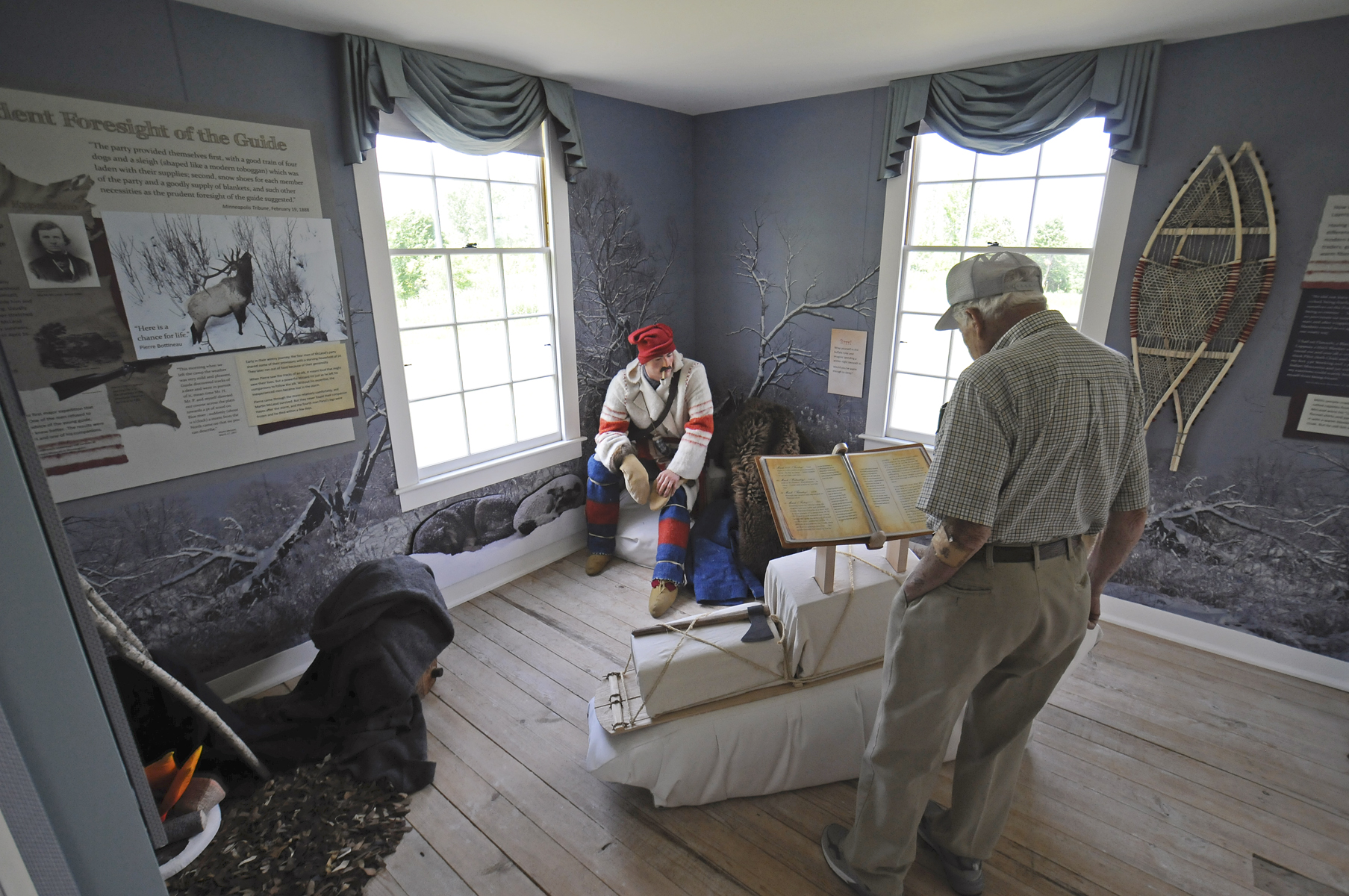
Exhibits in house interior

The structure is a Greek Revival style pine house and was the first wood‑framed house in Maple Grove. The frame combines heavy timber members with lighter framing, known as balloon frame construction. Balloon framing has 2 x 4 wall studs that run in continuous lengths from the floor to the roof peak.

Greek Revival features include corner boards that resemble simple columns and a front entry with sidelights. The roofline creates what is called a broken pediment at the gable ends.

Today the restored house functions as a museum setting with finished rooms that present furnishings and exhibits related to Bottineau's household and work. Interior interpretation focuses on daily life, trade, guiding, and the role of a mixed French Canadian and Indigenous family in regional history.

== Park and landscape ==
The house stands within Elm Creek Park Reserve in Maple Grove, near a trail system and the Elm Creek chalet. Park staff present guided programs and open house events that link the building to broader stories of settlement, Métis communities, and Indigenous presence in the region.

Its current site contains woodland and open ground that resemble the landscape of Bottineau's original homestead area. The surrounding parkland provides context for discussions of travel routes, prairies, and river systems that shaped Bottineau's work as a guide and interpreter.
