= Pierre Bottineau Library =

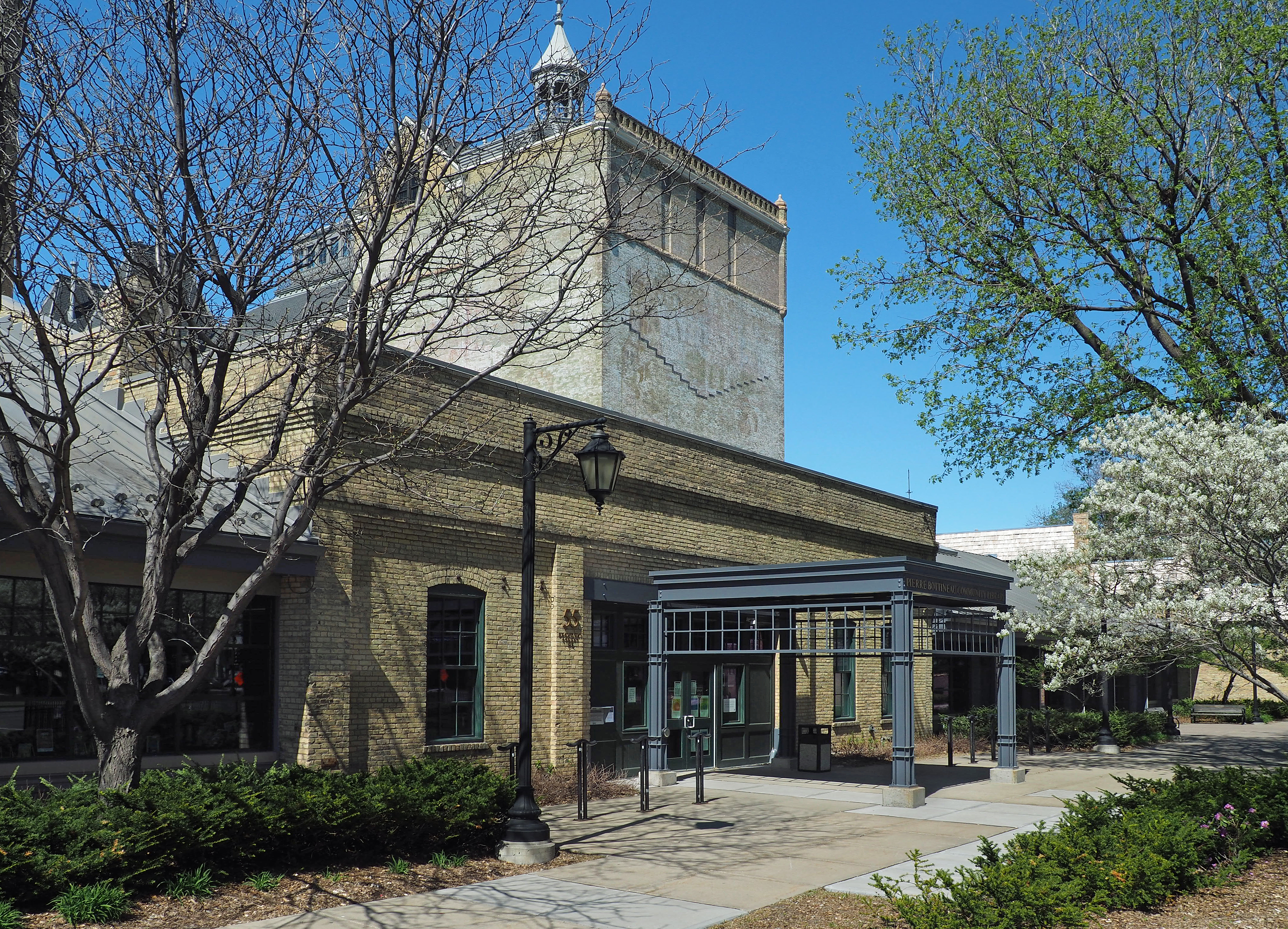
- Pierre Bottineau Library from the southwest
- Interactive map of the Pierre Bottineau Library area
- Former names: Pierre Bottineau Community Library

General information
- Type: Branch library
- Location: 55 Broadway Street NE; Minneapolis, Minnesota; 55413
- Coordinates: 44°59′57″N 93°16′12″W
- Construction started: 1893 and 1913
- Opened: May 31, 2003
- Renovated: 2002
- Owner: Hennepin County Library System

Technical details
- Floor area: 12,355 square feet (1,147.8 m^{2})

Renovating team
- Architect: RSP Architects

Pierre Bottineau Library (formerly Pierre Bottineau Community Library) is a branch library located in northeast Minneapolis, Minnesota, United States. It was named for Pierre Bottineau, a prominent Minnesota frontiersman and is one of 41 libraries in the Hennepin County Library System. The library moved to its current location at the historic Grain Belt campus in 2003. The 12,355-square-foot (1,147.8 m^{2}) facility combines two historic buildings, the 1893 Wagon Shed and the 1913 Millwright Shop, with an addition designed by RSP Architects.

== History ==
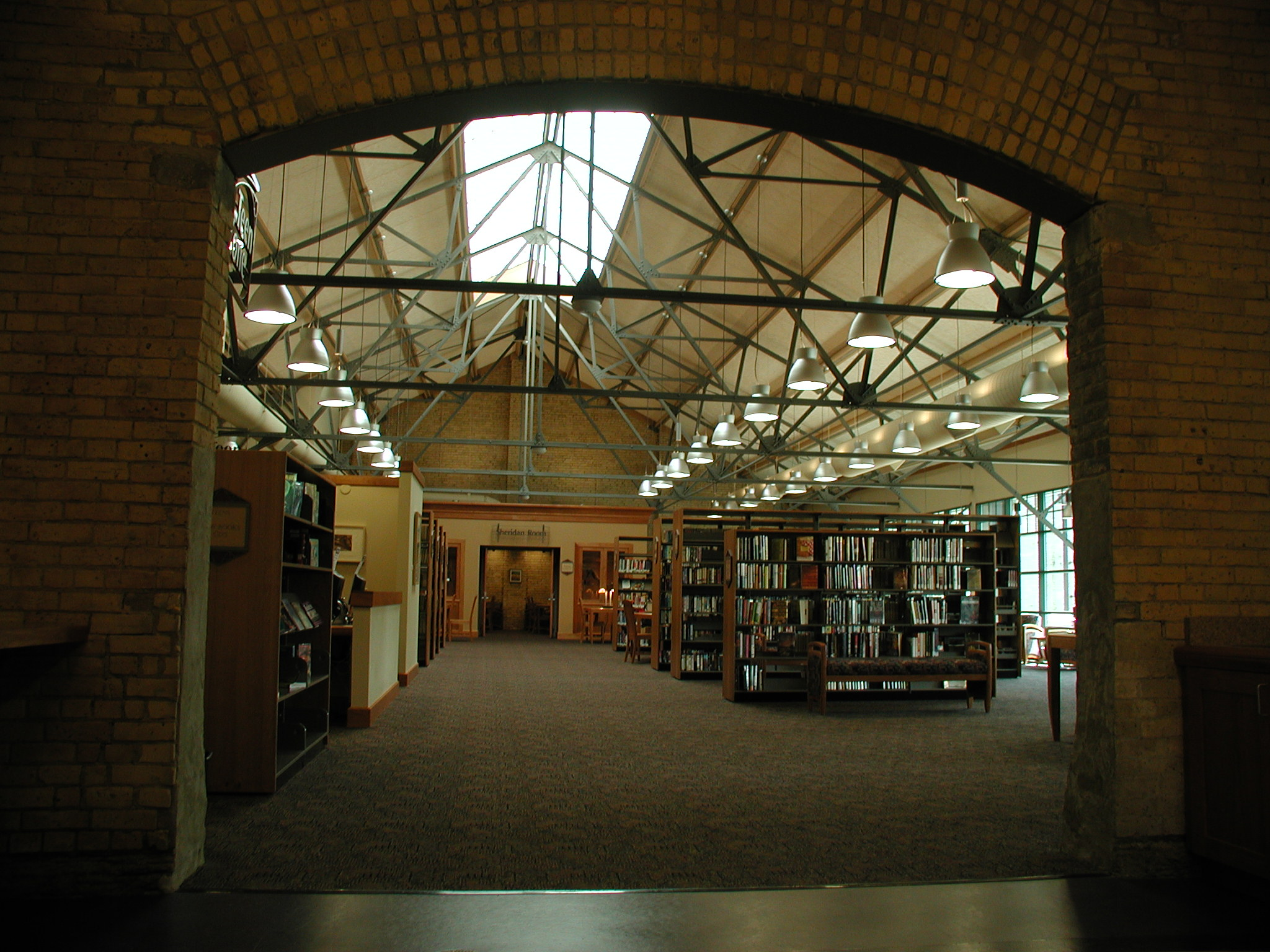
Library interior

The Northeast Minneapolis area had been served by the Minneapolis Public Library since 1913. The first library in the neighborhood was housed at Sheridan Junior High School; later, the library moved to the field house at Logan Park where it went by the name Logan Park Library. Pierre Bottineau's next incarnation was housed in a 2,044-square-foot (189.9 m^{2}) rented space at 1224 Northeast 2nd Street where it resided beginning in 1957. As of 2000, not only was it the system's only rented space but it was also the smallest at less than half the size of the lobby of the 1961 downtown Minneapolis Central Library. As Pierre Bottineau's capacity was legally set at only 40 occupants, a sign on the door would inform potential patrons that "The library is now full."

The Grain Belt location is six times the size of Pierre Bottineau's previous home and was proposed in 2000 by the Minneapolis Library Board. Support from the Minnesota Historical Society was necessary to proceed with renovations on the site as the Historical Society controlled the $500,000 earmarked for work on the Grain Belt site that the Minnesota Legislature had approved five years before. The total project cost was estimated at $2.5 million of which the Library Board was to pay half. Pierre Bottineau's move to the Grain Belt building was supported by the Sheridan Neighborhood Association and the Minneapolis Community Development Agency, the latter of which sought a grant to refurbish a next-door fountain and park.

Work on the new facility began in 2002 with costs totaling $3.1 million. Emphasis in the library was placed on meeting the needs of children as the old Pierre Bottineau received heavy use from school-age youths. Pierre Bottineau opened May 31, 2003.

Budget woes caused the Minneapolis Public Library to temporarily close three different branches in part due to a loss of local government aid in early 2007. A merger with the Hennepin County Libraries was approved by both systems' boards along with the Minneapolis City Council, and Pierre Bottineau reopened at 10 am on January 2, 2008, as a Hennepin County Library.
