= Abercrombie, North Dakota =

- City
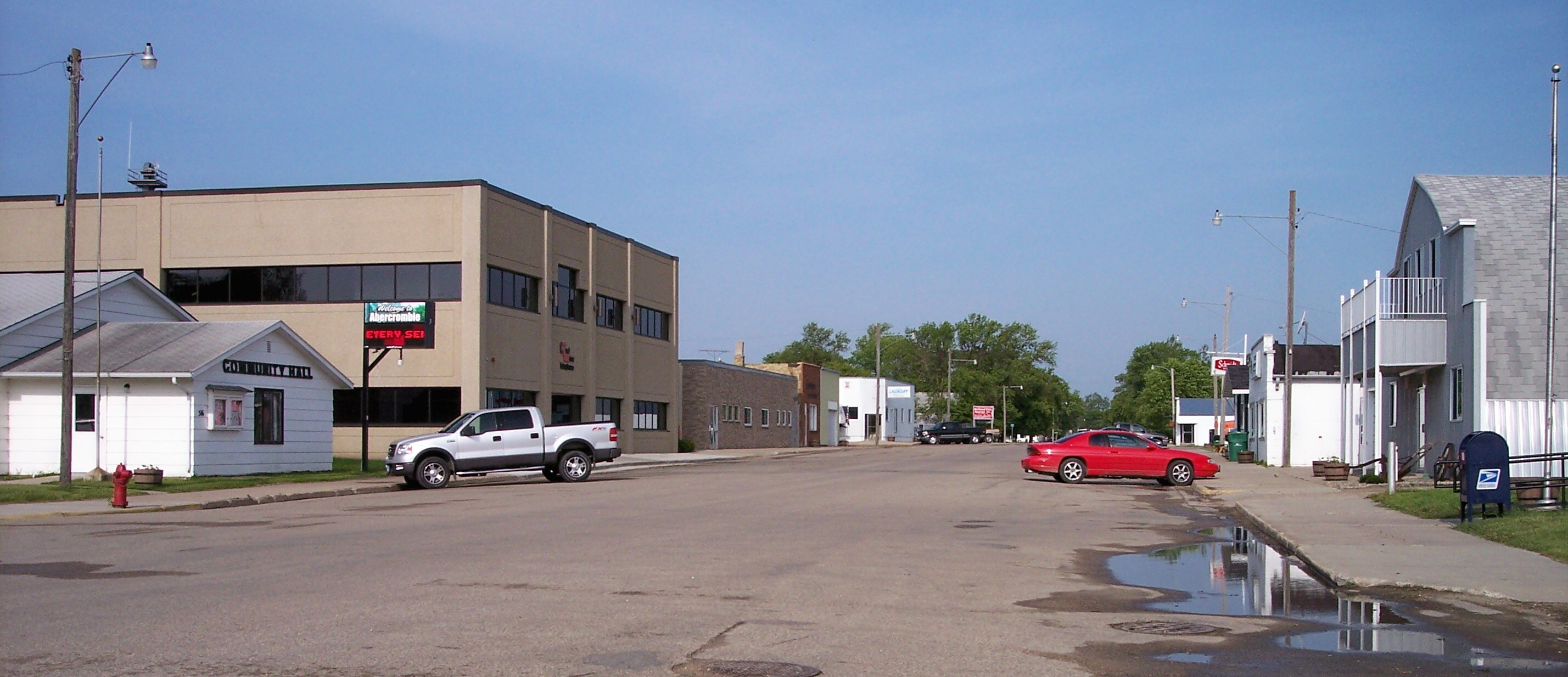
- Broadway in Abercrombie in 2007
- Interactive map of Abercrombie, North Dakota
- Location within North Dakota
- Coordinates: 46.4470°N 96.7296°W
- Country: United States
- State: North Dakota
- County: Richland
- Micro: Wahpeton–Breckenridge
- Founded: 1884
- Incorporated (village): April 5, 1904
- Incorporated (city): July 1, 1967
- Named after: Fort Abercrombie

Government
  - Type: Mayor–council
  - Mayor: Shawn Paczkowski
  - Auditor: Morgan Bolme
  - Councilmembers: David Hammond; Brian Heinz; Alex Paczkowski; Kris Hasbargen

Area
  - Total: 0.330 sq mi (0.854 km^{2})
  - Land: 0.330 sq mi (0.854 km^{2})
  - Water: 0 sq mi (0.000 km^{2}) 0.00%
- Elevation: 935 ft (285 m)

Population (2020)
  - Total: 244
  - Estimate (2025): 269
  - Density: 740/sq mi (286/km^{2})
- Time zone: UTC–6 (Central (CST))
  - Summer (DST): UTC–5 (CDT)
- ZIP Code: 58001
- Area code: 701
- FIPS code: 38-00100
- GNIS feature ID: 1035900
- Website: cityofabercrombiend.com

Abercrombie is a city in Richland County, North Dakota, United States. The population was 244 as of the 2020 census, and was estimated at 269 in 2025. It is part of the "Wahpeton micropolitan area" or "Wahpeton–Breckenridge".

== History ==
Abercrombie was founded in 1884. It was named after Fort Abercrombie, a local military installation adjacent to the city. This means the city indirectly received its name from Lieutenant Colonel Abercrombie, first commanding officer of the fort. The city is part of the military reservation and is located on section 4, 134–48. Abercrombie was incorporated as a village on April 5, 1904 and as a city on July 1, 1967.

Abercrombie did not come into being until 1884, when Fargo and Southern Railroad was built through the Red River Valley along the Red River. Then directly west of the old fort, the town of Abercrombie was started.

== Geography ==
According to the United States Census Bureau, the city has a total area of 0.330 square miles (0.85 km^{2}), all land.

== Climate ==
This climatic region is typified by large seasonal temperature differences, with warm to hot (and often humid) summers and cold (sometimes severely cold) winters. According to the Köppen Climate Classification system, Abercrombie has a humid continental climate, abbreviated "Dfb" on climate maps.

== Demographics ==
Historical population
Census	Pop.	Note	%±
1910	299		—
1920	266		−11.0%
1930	242		−9.0%
1940	215		−11.2%
1950	244		13.5%
1960	244		0.0%
1970	262		7.4%
1980	260		−0.8%
1990	252		−3.1%
2000	296		17.5%
2010	263		−11.1%
2020	244		−7.2%
2025 (est.)	269		10.2%
U.S. Decennial Census; 2020 Census

As of the 2024 American Community Survey, there were 105 estimated households in Abercrombie with an average of 2.21 persons per household. The city has a median household income of $64,844. Approximately 9.1% of the city's population lives at or below the poverty line. Abercrombie has an estimated 68.3% employment rate, with 18.3% of the population holding a bachelor's degree or higher and 98.2% holding a high school diploma. There were 116 housing units at an average density of 0 per square mile (0.0/km^{2}).

The top five reported languages (people were allowed to report up to two languages, thus the figures will generally add to more than 100%) were English (100.00%), Spanish (0.0%), Indo-European (0.0%), Asian and Pacific Islander (0.0%), and Other (0.0%).

The median age in the city was 41.8 years.

Abercrombie, North Dakota – racial and ethnic composition Note: the US Census treats Hispanic/Latino as an ethnic category. This table excludes Latinos from the racial categories and assigns them to a separate category. Hispanics/Latinos may be of any race.
Race / ethnicity (NH = non-Hispanic)	Pop. 2000	Pop. 2010	Pop. 2020	% 2000	% 2010	% 2020
White alone (NH)	286	259	231	96.62%	98.48%	94.67%
Black or African American alone (NH)	0	1	0	0.00%	0.38%	0.00%
Native American or Alaska Native alone (NH)	4	2	7	1.35%	0.76%	2.87%
Asian alone (NH)	1	0	0	0.34%	0.00%	0.00%
Pacific Islander alone (NH)	0	0	0	0.00%	0.00%	0.00%
Other race alone (NH)	0	0	0	0.00%	0.00%	0.00%
Mixed race or multiracial (NH)	5	0	5	1.69%	0.00%	2.05%
Hispanic or Latino (any race)	0	1	1	0.00%	0.38%	0.41%
Total	296	263	244	100.00%	100.00%	100.00%

=== 2020 census ===
As of the 2020 census, there were 244 people, 106 households, and 67 families residing in the city. The population density was 753.09 inhabitants per square mile (290.8/km^{2}). There were 119 housing units at an average density of 367.28 per square mile (141.8/km^{2}). The racial makeup of the city was 94.67% White, 0.00% African American, 2.87% Native American, 0.00% Asian, 0.00% Pacific Islander, 0.41% from some other races and 2.05% from two or more races. Hispanic or Latino people of any race were 0.41% of the population.

=== 2010 census ===
As of the 2010 census, there were 263 people, 104 households, and 68 families residing in the city. The population density was 431.86 inhabitants per square mile (166.7/km^{2}). There were 121 housing units at an average density of 198.69 per square mile (76.7/km^{2}). The racial makeup of the city was 98.48% White, 0.38% African American, 0.76% Native American, 0.00% Asian, 0.00% Pacific Islander, 0.00% from some other races and 0.38% from two or more races. Hispanic or Latino people of any race were 0.38% of the population.

There were 104 households, of which 37.5% had children under the age of 18 living with them, 52.9% were married couples living together, 8.7% had a female householder with no husband present, 3.8% had a male householder with no wife present, and 34.6% were non-families. 31.7% of all households were made up of individuals, and 16.4% had someone living alone who was 65 years of age or older. The average household size was 2.53 and the average family size was 3.15.

The median age in the city was 35.8 years. 30.4% of residents were under the age of 18; 5.4% were between the ages of 18 and 24; 25.9% were from 25 to 44; 25.8% were from 45 to 64; and 12.5% were 65 years of age or older. The gender makeup of the city was 48.7% male and 51.3% female.

=== 2000 census ===
As of the 2000 census, there were 296 people, 118 households, and 73 families residing in the city. The population density was 482.62 inhabitants per square mile (186.3/km^{2}). There were 138 housing units at an average density of 225.01 per square mile (86.9/km^{2}). The racial makeup of the city was 96.62% White, 0.00% African American, 1.35% Native American, 0.34% Asian, 0.00% Pacific Islander, 0.00% from some other races and 1.69% from two or more races. Hispanic or Latino people of any race were 0.00% of the population.

The top 6 ancestry groups in the city are Norwegian (54.4%), German (41.9%), Irish (12.8%), Swedish (12.2%), English (7.4%), Czech (6.8%).

There were 118 households, out of which 35.6% had children under the age of 18 living with them, 54.2% were married couples living together, 5.1% had a female householder with no husband present, and 38.1% were non-families. 33.1% of all households were made up of individuals, and 9.3% had someone living alone who was 65 years of age or older. The average household size was 2.51 and the average family size was 3.27.

In the city, the population was spread out, with 32.1% under the age of 18, 6.4% from 18 to 24, 31.8% from 25 to 44, 18.9% from 45 to 64, and 10.8% who were 65 years of age or older. The median age was 33 years. For every 100 females, there were 124.2 males. For every 100 females age 18 and over, there were 113.8 males.

The median income for a household in the city was $34,167, and the median income for a family was $37,125. Males had a median income of $30,000 versus $17,321 for females. The per capita income for the city was $13,911. About 8.8% of families and 13.8% of the population were below the poverty line, including 19.5% of those under the age of eighteen and none of those 65 or over.

== Economy ==
The economy of Abercrombie is surrounded by agriculture. While agriculture does play the dominant role in the southern Red River Valley, the city of Abercrombie provides employment in sectors such as education, telecommunication, and manufacturing.

== Culture ==
Many of the settlers who came from Norway, Sweden and Denmark in the late 1860s and early 1870s came first to Wisconsin and southern Minnesota to work in the Lumber mills. While there, they heard much about the Red River Valley and its fertility and great possibility. At this time a Mr. Strandvold was writing articles geared towards appealing to young Norsemen with the intention of drawing them to the Valley.

== Education ==
The Richland Public School District 44 was organized in 1967.

- Richland Elementary School (Preschool-6) in Abercrombie
- Richland Junior/Senior High School (7-12) in Colfax

The area is served by the Richland Public School District 44. It operates the Abercrombie School. In the 2025-26 academic year, the district reported a total of 310 students.
