= Fort Abercrombie =

- U.S. National Register of Historic Places
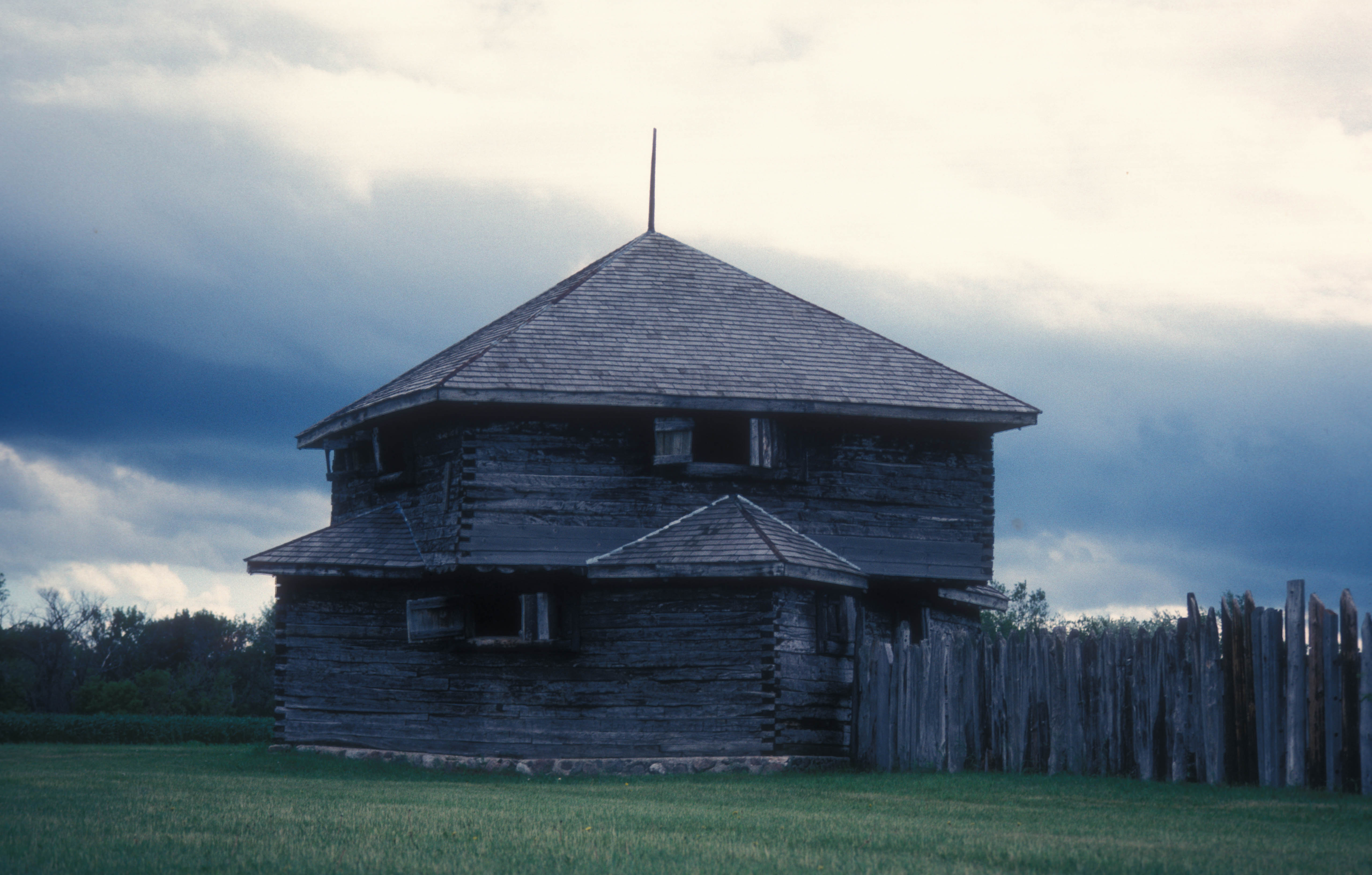
- Fort Abercrombie in 2007

- Location within North Dakota Location within the United States
- Location: Abercrombie, North Dakota
- Coordinates: 46°26′41″N 96°43′7″W
- Built: 1860
- Architect: WPA
- Architectural style: Rustic/Log
- NRHP reference No.: 08001367
- Added to NRHP: January 22, 2009

Fort Abercrombie, in North Dakota, was a United States Army fort established by authority of an Act of Congress, March 3, 1857. The act allocated twenty-five square miles of land on the Red River of the North in Dakota Territory to be used for a military outpost, but the exact location was left to the discretion of Lieutenant Colonel John J. Abercrombie. The fort was constructed in the year 1858. It was the first permanent military installation in what became North Dakota, and is thus known as "The Gateway to the Dakotas". Abercrombie selected a site right on the river. Spring flooding was a problem and the fort was abandoned. However, in 1860 the Army returned, moving the fort to higher ground.

== History ==
Because the original location was prone to flooding, a new fort was built at a higher location in 1860, north of the original location. It was besieged by the Dakota (Sioux) Indians for more than six weeks during the Dakota War of 1862. The fort was abandoned in 1877 and the town of Abercrombie, North Dakota, was founded a half mile west in 1884. Abercrombie Township was settled, in part, due to the early presence of the fort.

The fort served as a transportation hub as it guarded the Red River Trails used by the Red River ox cart trains of the late fur trade, military supply wagon trains, stagecoach routes, and steamboat traffic on the Red River.

The original buildings were either destroyed or sold at public auction when the fort was abandoned, but a Works Progress Administration project in 1939–1940 reconstructed three blockhouses and the stockade and returned the original military guardhouse to the site. More recent renovations include dismantling the southeast blockhouse and using salvageable materials to renovate the two remaining blockhouses and the guardhouse.

A new stockade was constructed and native grasses are allowed to grow in the locations of the missing buildings for visitors to get an idea about the size and shape of the buildings. A visitor center was built in the summer of 2007. Today it is known as Fort Abercrombie State Historic Site and includes a modern museum and pavilion in the town of Abercrombie. The fort itself is a quarter mile east. The Site contains a segment and trailhead for the North Country National Scenic Trail (map).

== Dakota War of 1862 ==
During the 1862 hostilities the Sioux attacked Fort Abercrombie, Fort Ridgely, New Ulm, Lower Sioux Indian Agency, and all of the white settlements bordering the Minnesota River. The hostiles were divided between two main attacking forces. The first constituted the larger lower agency force of Mdewakaton, Wahpute, Yankton, and Winnebago warriors. They fought at Fort Ridgely, New Ulm, Redwood Ferry, and Birch Coulee. The smaller upper agency force of Sisseton attacked the Ottertail Land Office, the nearby Pillager Chippewa village on Pine lake, Breckinridge, Grahams Crossing and Fort Abercrombie.

At the outbreak of the uprising, Fort Abercrombie was garrisoned by Company D of the 5th Minnesota Infantry Regiment, commanded by Captain John Vander Horck. On 23 August the fort was preparing to escort the Chipppewa treaty provisions when word came of the uprising on the lower Sioux Reservation. On August 25, 1862, Van der Horck mustered a militia company from the settlers seeking the security of the fort. Captain T. D. Smith, fort quartermaster, was appointed their commander

In August 1862 the fort was tested. Pierre Bottineau, Indian Commissioner Dole and the Chippewa treaty commission which included John Nickolay President Lincoln's private secretary were at Abercrombie seeking safety on the frontier. Increased Indian activity and word of the Uprising at the lower Sioux Agency caused nearby settlers to seek security at the fort's stockade. The Sioux besieged Fort Abercrombie for almost six weeks, alternating between occasional skirmishing and all-out attacks. The defenders, with rifles, shotguns, and two howitzers held the fort. The shotguns came out of the Chippewa treaty goods at the fort for safe keeping. The first incident was a raid in which the Sioux took over 300 animals, including the 200 cattle intended as part of the treaty payment to the Red Lake and Pembina Chippewa. The treaty signing, scheduled for August 25' was interrupted by the ongoing events. Fort Abercrombie was attacked three times. The first started at day break on September 3, 1862. It lasted six hours and was broken by the arrival of the Chippewa of G Company 9th Minn and Captain Ambrose Freeman's Company of Mounted Men, aka "Northern Rangers," from St. Cloud, Minnesota. When darkness fell Bottineau slipped out of the fort, through the Sioux lines, to trek the 80 miles to Sauk Center for reinforcements. The second attack came three days later killing and wounding a few defenders. Accounts of the second attack relate that the garrison was impressed by the obvious organization of the assault. Howitzer fire from the garrison kept the fort from being lost. Afterwards the garrison constructed defensive breastworks of soil and timbers around the untorched portion of the fort. Van der Horck, not having received any word or support from Fort Snelling, turned to the Chippewa at La Grand Fourche for support. After a long deliberation the Chiefs said rejected the request even though many of their men wanted to help, according to a report by Pierre Bottineau who had returned. Then followed an extended siege which was broke by the arrival of a 500 man militia force. Later when the Red Lake Chiefs learned that the Sioux had cattle intended for them and were the reason the treaty commission never came they offered to defend the northern frontier.

A soldier's letter later described the corpse of one of the defenders killed outside the fort. He was mutilated in the same manner reported of the Redwood ferryman at the Lower Agency.

Also afterwards, fort defenders and civilians felt Capt. T. D. Smith was owed recognition for his leadership and saving their lives. In one letter the fort commander Van der Hoeck was labeled a coward. On his own volition, he transferred Abercrombie's command to a senior State militia commander. The troops and civilians blamed Van der Hoeck for the deaths of two men. Another letter describes one of the dead, (Joseph Comptois, G Co. 9th Minn), as "one of the bravest citizens, a soldier from the redskins"(a White Earth Chippewa). Capt. Smith had to intervene three times to save Van der Hoeck from being shot by his own men.

G Co. 9th Minn remained posted to the garrison for over a year. Hatch's Battalion, aka the Minnesota Volunteer Indian Regiment, would relieve them and A Company 1st U.S. Vol. came in 1865. They were ex-confederate POWs mustered into federal service. The 8th Minn. also had a Company posted to the garrison from 1862 until May 1864 .

The Chippewa treaty commission returned to the Red River Valley in 1863 for the Treaty of Old Crossing at Fisher's landing.

=== Casualties ===
Killed:

- Sgt Edward Wright (Sept 23, 1862)
- Corporal James Bennett (with party sent to Breckinridge)
- Private Joseph Comptois (Sept 6, 1862)
- Ostler Charles W. Soell (Sept 6, 1862)
- Private Augustus Ruchenell

Wounded:

- Private C. P. Lull (Severely; Sept 23, 1862)
- Private Edwin M. Wright (Severely; Sept 3, 1862)

=== 1870 Intertribal Treaty ===
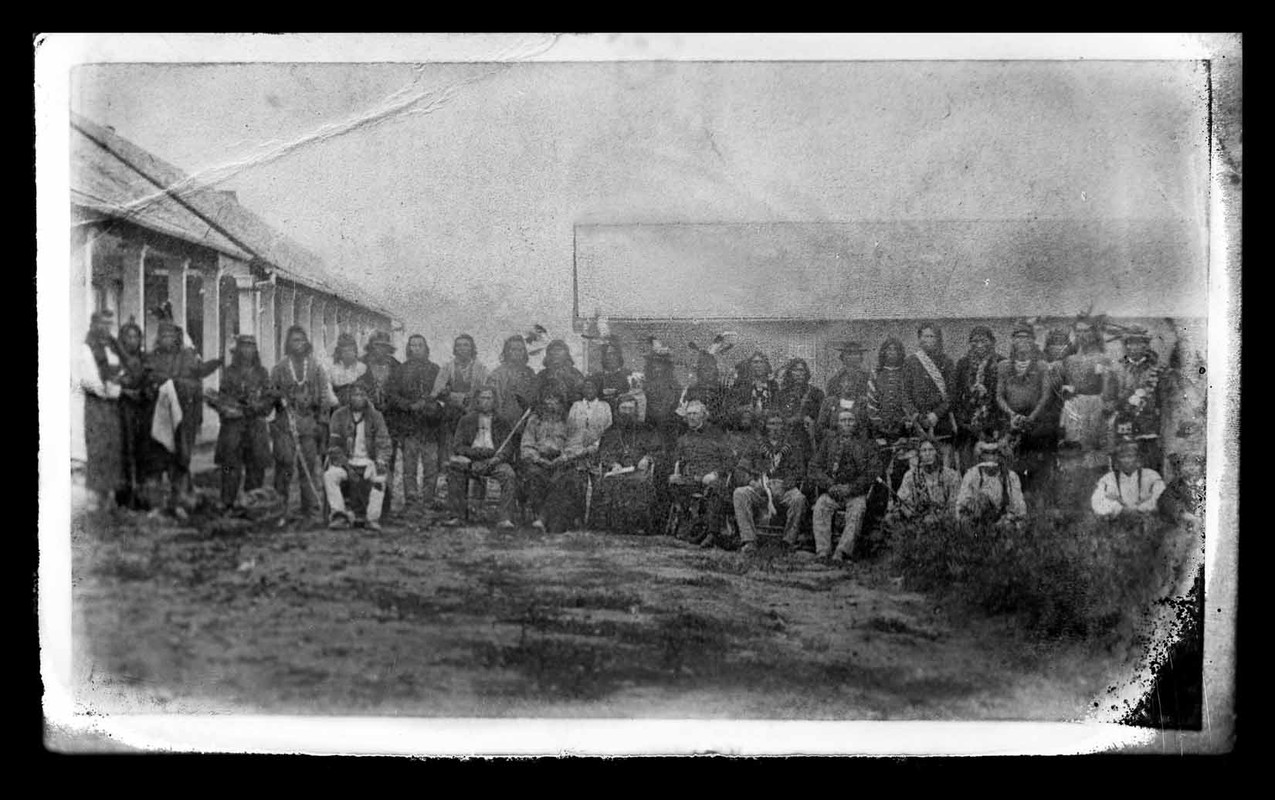
Sioux – Chippewa Peace Conference: Fort Abercrombie, August 12–15, 1870, Dakota Territory. The Sioux and Chippewa signed a Peace treaty that day that has never been broken.

On August 14, 1870 Sioux and Chippewa leaders signed a peace agreement at Fort Abercrombie instigated by the Catholic priest Father Genin. Intertribal hostilities had commenced again in 1868 with the deaths of two Sioux at the Leech lake Reservation. Chief Flatmouth II was accused of what happened on his Reservation. The 1870 treaty brought a successful end to the Intertribal issues that continues to the present. There were many names signed on that treaty.
