= Red River Trails =

Network of trails connecting the Red River Colony and Fort Garry in British North America

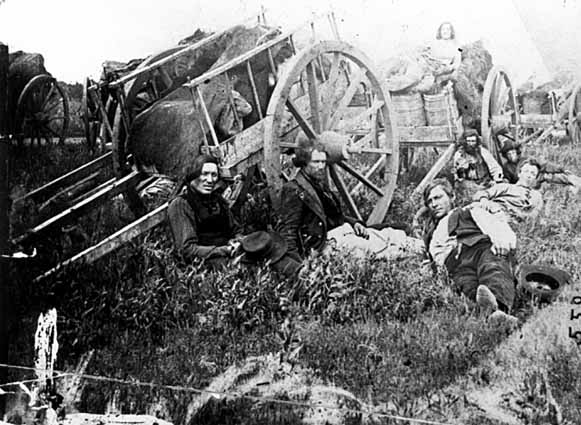
Métis drivers and ox carts at a rest stop

The Red River Trails were a network of ox cart routes connecting the Red River Colony (the "Selkirk Settlement") and Fort Garry in British North America with the head of navigation on the Mississippi River in the United States. These trade routes ran from the location of present-day Winnipeg in the Canadian province of Manitoba across the Canada–United States border, and thence by a variety of routes through what is now the eastern part of the Dakotas and across western and central Minnesota to Mendota and Saint Paul, Minnesota on the Mississippi.

Travellers began to use the trails by the 1820s, with the heaviest use from the 1840s to the early 1870s, when they were superseded by railways. Until then, these cartways provided the most efficient means of transportation between the isolated Red River Colony and the outside world. They gave the Selkirk colonists and their neighbours, the Métis people, an outlet for their furs and a source of supplies other than the Hudson's Bay Company, which was unable to enforce its monopoly in the face of the competition that used the trails.

Free traders, independent of the Hudson's Bay Company and outside its jurisdiction, developed extensive commerce with the United States, making Saint Paul the principal entrepôt and link to the outside world for the Selkirk Settlement. The trade, developed by and along the trails connecting Fort Garry with Saint Paul, stimulated commerce, contributed to the settlement of Minnesota and North Dakota in the United States, and accelerated the settlement of Canada to the west of the rugged barrier known as the Canadian Shield. For a time, this cross-border trade even threatened Canada's control of its western territories. The threat diminished after completion of transcontinental trade routes both north and south of the border, and the transportation corridor through which the trails once ran declined in importance. That corridor has now seen a resurgence of traffic, carried by more modern means of transport than the crude ox carts that once travelled the Red River Trails.

== Origins ==
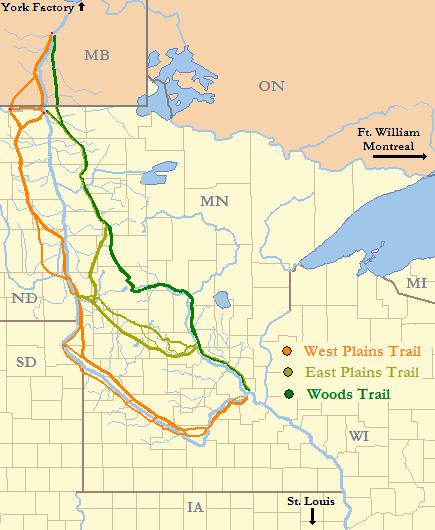

Red River Trails between Fort Garry and Saint Paul
Not all trails shown; there were many connecting trails and alternate routes.
Hold cursor over waypoints to display settlements; click to go to article.

In 1812, Thomas Douglas, 5th Earl of Selkirk, started a colony of settlers in British North America where the Assiniboine River joins the Red River at the site of modern Winnipeg. Although fur posts were scattered throughout the Canadian northwest, and settlements of Métis fur traders and bison hunters were located in the vicinity of Selkirk's establishment, this colony was the only agricultural settlement between Upper Canada and the Pacific Ocean. Isolated by geology behind the rugged Canadian Shield and many hundreds of miles of wilderness, settlers and their Métis neighbours had access to outside markets and sources of supply only by two laborious water routes.

The first, maintained by the Hudson's Bay Company (in which Lord Selkirk was a principal investor), was a sea route from Great Britain to York Factory on Hudson Bay, then up a chain of rivers and lakes to the colony, 780 miles (1,260 km) from salt water to the Assiniboine. The alternative was the historic route of the rival North West Company's voyageurs from Montreal through Lake Huron to Fort William on Lake Superior. Above Superior, this route followed rivers and lakes to Lac la Croix and west along the international border through Lake of the Woods to Rat Portage, and then down the Winnipeg River to the Red. The distance from the Selkirk settlement to Lake Superior at Fort William was about 500 miles (800 km), but Lake Superior was only the start of a lengthy journey to Montreal where furs and supplies would be transshipped to and from Europe.

Neither of these routes was suitable for heavy freight. Lighter cargoes were carried in York boats to Hudson Bay or in canoes on the border route. Both routes required navigation of large and hazardous lakes, shallow and rapid-strewn rivers, and swampy creeks and bogs, connected by numerous portages where both cargo and watercraft had to be carried on men's backs.

But geology also provided an alternate route, albeit across foreign territory. The valleys of the Red and Minnesota Rivers lay in the beds of Glacial Lake Agassiz and its prehistoric outlet Glacial River Warren; the lands exposed when these bodies of water receded were flat plains between low uplands covered by prairie grasslands. At the Traverse Gap, only a mile (1.6 km) of land separated the Bois des Sioux River, a source stream of the Red (which flowed north to Hudson Bay) and the Little Minnesota River, a source stream of the Minnesota River (tributary to the Mississippi, which flowed south to the Gulf of Mexico). The valley floors and uplands of the watercourses along this gently graded route provided a natural thoroughfare to the south. The eyes of the colonists therefore turned to the new United States, both as a source of supplies and an (illegal) outlet for their furs.

== Development of the routes ==
The rich fur areas along the upper Mississippi, Minnesota, Des Moines, and Missouri Rivers, occupied by Indigenous peoples, were exploited by independent fur traders operating from Prairie du Chien, Wisconsin in the late eighteenth century. At the beginning of the nineteenth century, these traders established fur posts in the Minnesota River valley at Lake Traverse, Big Stone Lake, Lac qui Parle, and Traverse des Sioux. The large fur companies also built posts, including the North West Company's stations at Pembina and St. Joseph in the valley of the Red River. The paths between these posts became parts of the first of the Red River Trails.

In 1815, 1822, and 1823, cattle were herded to the Red River Colony from Missouri by a route up the Des Moines River Valley to the Minnesota River, across the divide, then down the Red River to the Selkirk settlement. In 1819, following a devastating plague of locusts which left the colonists with insufficient seed to plant a crop, an expedition was sent by snowshoe to purchase seed at Prairie du Chien. It returned by flatboat up the Mississippi and Minnesota Rivers and down the Red River, arriving back at the settlement in the summer of 1820. In 1821, five dissatisfied settler families left the colony for Fort Snelling, the forerunners of later tides of migration up and down the valley between the two nations. Two years later in 1823, Major Stephen Harriman Long was the first official U.S. representative to reach Pembina; his expedition came by way of the Minnesota and Red Rivers. These early expeditions on the watersheds of these two streams were among the earliest known through trips on the route of the first Red River Trail.

=== West Plains Trail ===
The West Plains Trail had originated with Native Americans, and before the ox cart traffic it connected the fur-trading posts of the Columbia Fur Company. In fact, that company introduced the Red River ox cart to haul its furs and goods. It also developed the trails, and by the early 1830s, an expedition from the Selkirk settlement driving a flock of sheep from Kentucky to the Assiniboine found the trail to be well-marked.

From the Red River Settlement, the trail went south upstream along the Red River's west bank to Pembina, just across the international border. Pembina had been a fur-trading post since the last decade of the eighteenth century. From there, some traffic continued south along the river, but most cart trains went west along the Pembina River to St. Joseph near the border and then south, or else cut the corner to the southwest in order to intercept the southbound trail from St. Joseph. This north-south trail paralleled the Red River about thirty miles (48 km) to the west. By staying on the uplands west of the Red River, this route avoided crossing the tributaries of that river near their confluences with the Red, and also kept out of the swampy, flood-prone, and mosquito-ridden bottomlands in the lakebed of Glacial Lake Agassiz which the river drained.

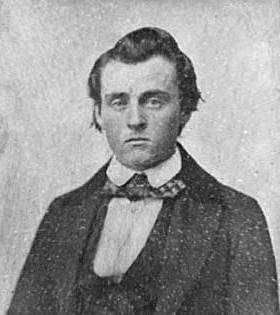
Fur trader and cart train operator Norman Kittson

In what is now southeastern North Dakota, the trail veered to the south-southeast to close with the Red River at Georgetown, Fort Abercrombie, and Breckenridge, Minnesota, all of which came into existence in consequence of the passing cart traffic. From Breckenridge, the trail continued upstream along the east bank of the Red and Bois des Sioux Rivers to the continental divide at Lake Traverse. Some traffic went along the lakeshore through the Traverse Gap on the continental divide, then down either side of Big Stone Lake, source of the Minnesota River, while other carters took a short cut directly south from the Bois des Sioux across the open prairie through modern Graceville, Minnesota thereby avoiding the wet country in the Traverse Gap.

The trail continued on intertwined routes down both sides of the valley of the Minnesota River past fur posts at Lac qui Parle and downstream locations, and the Upper Sioux and Lower Sioux Indian Agencies and Fort Ridgely, all established in the 1850s. From Fort Ridgely, the trail struck across the open prairie to the Minnesota River at Traverse des Sioux near modern-day St. Peter, Minnesota, where the furs and goods were, at first, usually transshipped to flatboats. In later years, most cart trains crossed to the east bank and proceeded northeast along the wooded river bottoms and uplands to Fort Snelling or Mendota, where the Minnesota River joined the Mississippi. From there furs were shipped down the Mississippi River to Saint Louis and other markets.

Sporadic at first, trade between Fort Garry and the Mississippi became more regular in 1835, when a caravan of traders from the Red River came to Mendota. The efforts of the Hudson's Bay Company to enforce its monopoly only induced the fur traders to avoid the company's jurisdiction by moving across the border to the United States. These included Norman Kittson whose enormous fur-trading and shipping enterprise along the West Plains Trail started with one six-cart train in 1844. In later years, trains consisting of hundreds of ox carts were sent from Kittson's post at Pembina, just inside U.S. territory and safely outside the reach of the Hudson's Bay Company. While some of this fur traffic was shifted to other routes in 1854, the forts, missions, Indian agencies, and remaining through traffic to Fort Garry kept the trails busy, and they were improved in the 1850s and supplemented by military roads.

=== Woods Trail ===
The West Plains Trail, although relatively level, went by a lengthy route through the lands of the Dakota people, and the shorter East Plains Trail also skirted Dakota land. The Dakota were the enemy of the Ojibwa, to whom the Métis carters were related by blood and marriage. These tensions led to conflicts. One such bloody confrontation in the summer of 1844 (caused by an attack by Métis carters on Dakota hunters) occurred when that year's expedition of free traders were in Saint Paul. This meant that they could not safely return by the normal route. The traders therefore struck northwest up the Mississippi to Crow Wing at the mouth of the Crow Wing River, west up that river and across the height of land to the fur post at Otter Tail Lake, then northwest across the prairie to a crossing of the Red River near its confluence with the Forest River. The next year, a southbound party followed its tracks, and by the year after (1846), the final route had been well-established inland from the Red River bottomlands. This trail was known as the Woods or Crow Wing Trail; it was also known locally as the Saint Paul Trail and Pembina Trail.

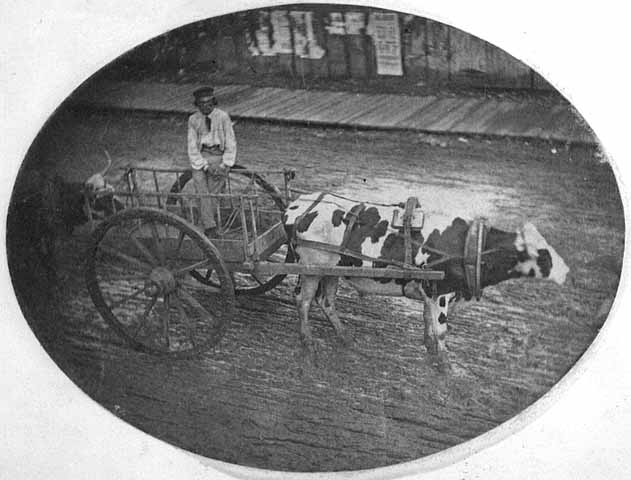
An ox cart seen at the end of the trail in Saint Paul

As the first of these names indicates, the path was partially wooded, as its southern reaches crossed the transition zone between the western prairies and eastern woodland. From Fort Garry, southbound cart trains followed the eastern edge of the Red River's Great Plains, crossing the Roseau River and the international border. In Minnesota, the trail was joined by a route coming from Pembina to the northwest, and continued south on a level prairie in the former lakebed of prehistoric Lake Agassiz. It ascended to and followed a firm gravelly ridge which was once among the higher beaches or strandlines of that ancient lake, forded the Red Lake River at the Old Crossing near modern Huot, and angled south by southeast to the fur post at White Earth. At Otter Tail Lake, the route left the plains and turned east into a forest in the Leaf Mountains on the continental divide. Taking a difficult but scenic path east through the woods, the trail crossed the Mississippi River at Old Crow Wing. It then went south down the east bank of that river on a smooth and open glacial outwash sandplain to Sauk Rapids and East Saint Cloud.

The final lap of the trail to Saint Paul, which had replaced Mendota as the principal entrepôt for the cart trade, continued along the sandplain on the east bank of the Mississippi. This route ran within a few miles of the river to Saint Anthony Falls and the community of that name which was growing on the east bank of the Mississippi. The trail then left the river and crossed open country to Saint Paul. The carters camped on the uplands west of the steamboat landing during the interval between their arrival with the furs and their return to the north with supplies and trade goods.

Inferior in terrain to other routes, the Woods Trail was superior in safety, as it was well within the lands of the Ojibwa. It was less well used during times of relative calm. In the late 1850s, its utility was increased by improvements made by the U.S. Army, which straightened and improved the winding ox path through the woods along the Leaf and Crow Wing Rivers, and also replaced the old trail along the Mississippi River between Fort Ripley (near Crow Wing) and Sauk Rapids with a military road.

=== East Plains Trail ===
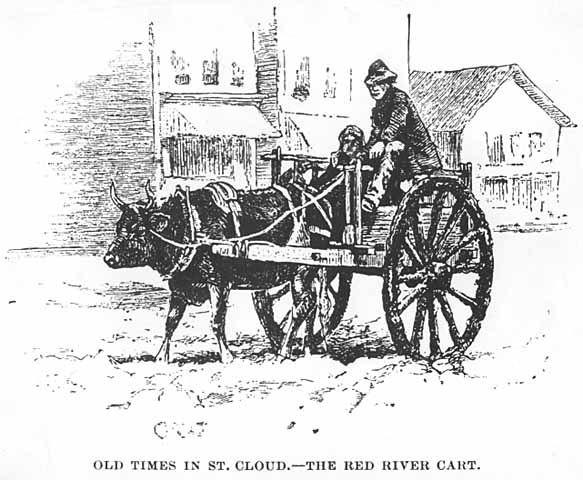
Red River cart at Saint Cloud

The Middle or East Plains Trail also came into common use in the 1840s. Shorter than the competing West Plain Trail, it became the route of the large cart trains originating from Pembina when well-known trader Henry Sibley retired from the fur trade in 1854. His successor and former partner Norman Kittson moved their company's cart trains from the West Plains Trail in the Minnesota River valley to the East Plains route.

The East Plains Trail followed the older routes of the West Plains Trail from Pembina to Breckenridge, Minnesota, then struck east by a variety of routes out of the Red River Valley across the upper valleys of the Pomme de Terre and Chippewa Rivers (tributaries of the Minnesota River), to Saint Cloud and Sauk Rapids on the Upper Mississippi. Soon however, a branch was added to connect the East Plains Trail with the Woods Trail. This link skirted the west slope of the Leaf Mountains and joined the East Plains routes at Elbow Lake or near the Otter Tail River. At times, this eastern connection may have been the better-travelled of the two variants.

At Saint Cloud, the furs of some of the cart brigades were transshipped to river craft on the Mississippi, which operated to Saint Anthony Falls at Minneapolis. Other cart trains crossed the Mississippi and travelled on to Saint Paul on a route shared with the Woods Trail.

Over most of its route, the East Plains Trail went through a post-glacial landscape of lakes, moraines, and drumlins, with beautiful scenery and difficult swamps. As the area became settled during Minnesota's territorial and early statehood days, the routes were improved, stagecoach service was instituted, towns were established, and permanent settlement began.

== Commerce ==
The trails were first used to obtain seed and supplies for the Selkirk colony. They soon became trade routes for local fur traders, and in the 1830s began to be heavily used by American fur traders operating just south of the international border. The Americans acquired furs from Métis fur traders in British North America who were evading the Hudson's Bay Company monopoly on trade within its chartered domain.

The settlement at Fort Garry was isolated and at the end of a 700-mile (1,100 km) water and land route from York Factory, which was served by only one or two ships each year. Orders from Britain had to be placed a year in advance. But from Saint Paul, the settlers could obtain staples and other goods in the span of a single summer. In the face of these relative inconveniences and the economy of shipping over the trails, the Hudson's Bay Company was unable to compel all trade to go by way of York Factory on Hudson Bay, and by 1850 the company's monopoly was broken. In fact, the company itself all but abandoned the York Factory route for heavy trade in 1857, and instead shipped its own traffic in bond through the United States and over the Red River Trails.

The principal export from the Red River settlements was fur, but as the colony passed from a subsistence economy to one producing more than could be consumed locally the agricultural surplus was also sent south by ox cart. The imports were more varied; originally they were seed, spices, and other staples, liquor, tools, implements, and hardware. In midcentury the buffalo herds declined, and traffic in furs began to be replaced by the produce and needs of settlers. As settlement developed the trails became a "common carrier" for all manner of goods that could be carried by ox cart, including lamps and coal oil to burn in them, fine cloth, books, general merchandise, champagne, sheet-metal stoves, disassembled farm machinery and at least one piano, and a printing press and other accoutrements for the first newspaper in the Fort Garry region.

== Life on the trail ==
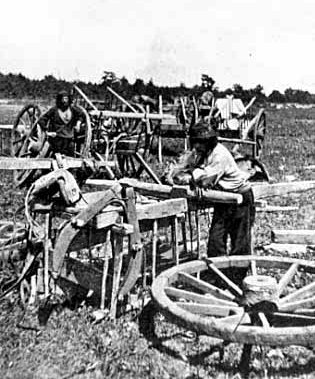
Axle repair on an ox cart in Pembina before setting out for Saint Anthony Falls

The typical carters were Métis descended from French voyageurs of the fur trade and their Ojibway spouses. Their conveyance was the Red River ox cart, a simple vehicle derived either from the two-wheeled charrettes used in French Canada, or from Scottish carts. From 1801 on, this cart was modified so that it was made solely from local materials. It contained no iron at all. Instead it was constructed entirely of wood and animal hide. Two twelve-foot-long parallel oak shafts or "trams" bracketed the draft animal in front and formed the frame of the cart to the rear. Cross-pieces held the floorboards, while front, side and rear boards or rails enclosed the box. These wooden pieces were joined by mortices and tenons. The axle was also made of seasoned oak. It was lashed to the cart by strips of wet bison hide known by its Cree name of shaganappi, which shrank and tightened as they dried. The axles connected two spoked wheels, five or six feet in diameter, which were "dished" or in the form of a shallow cone, the apex of which was at the hubs, which were inboard of the rims. The carts were originally drawn by small horses obtained from the First Nations. After cattle were brought to the colony in the 1820s, oxen were used to haul the carts. They were preferred because of their strength, endurance, and cloven hooves which spread their weight in swampy areas.

The cart, constructed of native materials, could easily be repaired. A supply of shaganappi and wood was carried as a cart could break a half-dozen axles in a one-way trip. The axles were unlubricated, as grease would capture dust which would act as sandpaper and immobilize the cart. The resultant squeal sounded like an untuned violin, giving it the sobriquet of "the North West fiddle". One visitor wrote that "a den of wild beasts cannot be compared with its hideousness". The noise was audible for miles. The carts were completely unsprung, and only their flexible construction cushioned the shocks transmitted from the humps and hollows of the trail.

Southbound, the carts were loaded with fur, packed into the 90-pound (41 kg) bundles known in the fur trade as pièces. A cart could handle 800 to 1,000 pounds (360 to 450 kilograms). On their return the traders carried staples, trade goods, and manufactured goods unavailable at Fort Garry. In both directions, the cargo was covered with hide or canvas. The carts were lashed together in brigades of ten carts, with three drivers and an overseer. These brigades could join in trains up to two miles (three km) in length. Carts numbering in the low hundreds annually used the trails in the 1840s, many hundreds in the 1850s, and thousands in the late 1860s. These cart trains travelled about two miles (three km) an hour, and about twenty miles (thirty km) in a day.

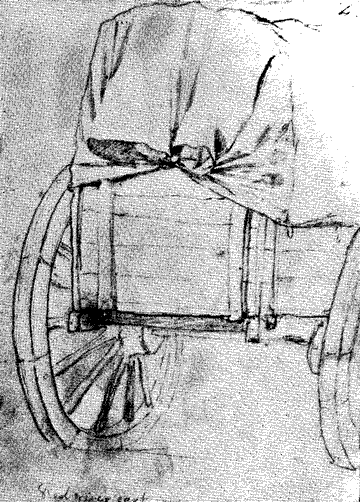
Red River ox cart (1851), by Frank Blackwell Mayer

After breaking camp in the morning, the carters set out across the prairie; transits of the unprotected open prairie between places of refuge were known as traverses. Streams often had to be forded; where the water was too deep, the carts were unloaded, the wheels were taken off and lashed together or affixed under the cart, the assemblage was covered with hide to form a hull, and the makeshift craft was reloaded and floated across. The traders endeavoured to ford a stream at the end of the day rather than start the next day with the crossing, to allow time to dry out overnight.

Streamside camps offered wood, water, and some protection from the hazards of open land. The prairie could be dangerous in time of native unrest, and trade ceased entirely for a time during the Dakota War of 1862. Prairie fires, driven by winds, were a risk in dry spells. Wet weather turned rivers into torrents, approaches to streams into bogs, and worn paths into morasses. Blizzards could strand traders and threaten them with starvation. Insects harassed both the traders and their draft animals, depriving them of sleep and weakening them.

There were compensations. Game was plentiful and the traders rarely lacked fresh meat. Some saw in the seemingly boundless prairies a colourful ocean of grass, and summer storms could be awe-inspiring, although dangerous. While the prairie had its own grandeur, after weeks of travel over treeless steppe the rivers, lakes, and woods of central Minnesota were a welcome relief.

After six or so weeks on the trail, the brigades reached Saint Paul. There the carters camped on the bluff above the town growing on the riverfront. Not all was harmonious. To the locals, the swarthy-complected carters up on the hill had a "devil-may-care" aspect, with their "curious commingling of civilized garments and barbaric adornments". One trader from the north called his host city "a wretched little village" where "drinking whisky seems to occupy at least half the time of the worth[y] citizens", while the rest were "employed in cheating each other or imposing upon strangers. The economic benefits of trade, and the separation of the carters' camp from the village below, may have helped keep relations civil. After about three weeks of trading, the "wild" carters from the north, now laden with goods, took their leave of the "den of blackguards" that was Saint Paul, returning to what they felt was a more civilized world. Their erstwhile hosts, on the other hand, thought their visitors were returning to an uncivilized and frozen wilderness.

== End of the trails ==
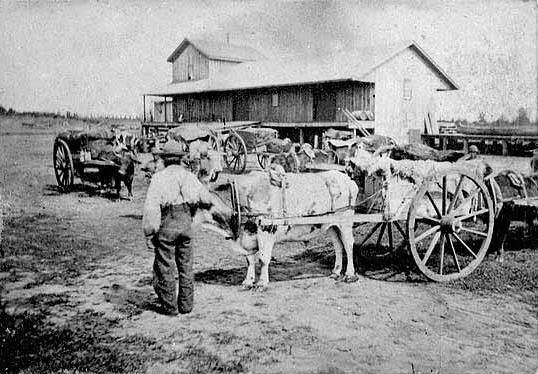
Red River carts meet the instrument of their demise: carts and traders at a railway station

At times, some ox cart trains did not go all the way through, but were supplemented by river craft. First flatboats and then shallow-draft steamboats ascended the Minnesota River to Traverse des Sioux and upstream points, where they were met by cart brigades travelling the West Plains Trail. In 1851, weekly steamboat service on the Mississippi began between Saint Anthony Falls and Sauk Rapids on the Middle and Woods trails. In 1859, steamboat machinery was carried overland to the Red River where a boat was built, but service was intermittent. The Dakota War of 1862 and the American Civil War delayed further improvements.

After the Civil War, the age of steam came to the region. After Ojibwe title to the Red River Valley had been extinguished on the United States side of the Canada–United States border by the Treaty of Old Crossing in 1863, steamboat service was revived on the Red River, and railways were built west from Saint Paul and Duluth, Minnesota on Lake Superior. A branch of the St. Paul and Pacific Railroad reached St. Cloud in 1866. Its mainline reached Willmar in 1869 and Benson, Minnesota the following year. Each end-of-track town in its turn became the terminus for many of the cart trains. In 1871, the railway reached the Red River at Breckenridge, where revived steamboat service carried the traffic the rest of way to Fort Garry. The long trains of carts drawn by oxen were replaced by railway trains powered by steam, and the trails reverted to nature.

A few traces of the vanished trails still exist. Some local roads follow their routes; depressions in the landscape show where thousands of carts once passed, and even after a century and a half of winters and springs freezing and thawing the land, there are still places where soils remain compacted and resistant to the plow. Some of these subtle artifacts are marked or are visible to those with discerning eyes, but in most places the trails have been obliterated. Their locations are noted at parks and wayside signs, and trail locations near Baxter, St. Hilaire, and West Union, Minnesota are recognised on the U.S. National Register of Historic Places.

== Significance ==
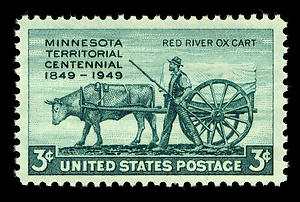
Postage stamp on the centennial of Minnesota Territory

The Red River Trails are less well known today than many other pioneer trails and trade routes in North America, and do not occupy as large a place in folklore as the great western trails in the United States and the fur-trading canoe routes of Canada. They were neither fought over nor the locus of battles (with the exception of the Dakota War of 1862), and although hazardous at times, other trails presented greater dangers. It may be that this relative lack of attention is due to the fact they did not lead to annexation of any territory to either of the nations in which the trails were located.

The trails nevertheless were instrumental in the development of central North America. Traffic over the West Plains Trail sustained the Selkirk Settlement in its early years. The trails also gave settlers of that colony and their Métis neighbours a route for migration as well as a highway for trade that was not dependent on the Hudson's Bay Company. As usage grew, old fur trading posts became settlements and new communities were established along the cart routes. The trails pioneered by the fur brigades accelerated development of Minnesota and North Dakota, and facilitated settlement of the Canadian northwest.

The trails had profound political effects during a time of Anglo-American tension. Both Britain and the U.S. were concerned about each other's cross-border influences. Born out of commercial needs and located by the dictates of geography, the trails helped create and contribute to these international influences and the tensions which resulted. The United States sent military expeditions along the route of the trails to assert national interests in the face of the continued British presence in the northwestern fur posts on soil which the U.S. claimed. The Americans were also concerned about the establishment of Lord Selkirk's colony as well as British claims to the Red River Valley. Finally the U.S. wanted to curtail Britain's attempts to get access to the Mississippi, access implicit in the Treaty of Paris ending the American War of Independence, and which Britain sought into the nineteenth century. The United States' assertion of dominion over its new territories parried and reversed the British domination of the fur trade in the upper Mississippi valley, which had continued for decades after the Revolutionary War settlement which had assigned those territories to the new nation.

"I have had occasion to observe the great facilities which nature offers, for a commercial intercourse between the country which I propose to establish, & the American settlements in the Missouri & Illinois Territories; from whence our people might draw their supplies of many articles, by way of the Mississipi & River St. Peters, with greater facility than from Canada or from Europe. This traffic, tho' it might be of small account at first, would increase with the progress of our Settlements, creating a growing demand for many articles of American produce."
—Letter of 22 December 1817 from Thomas Douglas, Fifth Earl of Selkirk, to U.S. Secretary of State John Quincy Adams

Later, the economic dependence of the Selkirk Settlement and the Canadian northwest on the Red River trade routes to U.S. markets came to pose a threat to British and Canadian control of their territory. At a time when a sense of Canadian nationality was tenuous in the northwest, that region relied on the Red River Trails and its successor steamboat and rail lines as an outlet for its products and a source of supplies. An active Manifest Destiny faction in Minnesota sought to exploit these commercial ties as a means of acquiring northwestern Canada for the United States. This pressure prompted Canada to take over the Hudson's Bay Company territory in return for monetary and land compensation. It contributed to Canadian Confederation and the establishment of Manitoba. It also led to the decision that there should be an all-Canada route for the Canadian Pacific Railway. Not until completion of that line in 1885 did Manitoba and the northwest finally have reliable and efficient access to eastern Canada by a route located entirely on Canadian soil.

Today, the international border is firmly established and peaceful; there is a greater sense of Canadian nationality, and fears of U.S. Manifest Destiny have all but disappeared. Canada and the U.S. have formalized their trading partnership with the North American Free Trade Agreement, leading to increased trade between the two nations. This trade now coursing up and down the valleys of the Red and Mississippi rivers more than fulfils Lord Selkirk's predictions made nearly two centuries ago; while he first sought access over U.S. territory for the succour of his nascent colony, now commerce in manufactures and commodities goes in both directions. The trade corridor once occupied by the long-gone Red River Trails continues to be employed for its historic purposes.

== See also ==
- Pembina Trail on the Canadian portion of the trails
- Carlton Trail
- History of Winnipeg
- Territorial era of Minnesota
