= Treaty of Old Crossing =

The Pembina and Red Lake bands of Chippewa ceded to the United States the Red River Valley of the north in two treaties. Both were named for the treaty site, "Old Crossing" and the year, Treaty of Old Crossing (1863) and the Treaty of Old Crossing (1864). In Minnesota, the ceded territory included all land west of a line running generally southwest from the Lake of the Woods to Thief Lake, about 30 miles (48 km) west of Red Lake, and then angling southeast to the headwaters of the Wild Rice River near the divide separating the watersheds of the Red River of the North and the Mississippi River. In North Dakota, the ceded territory was all of the Red River Valley north of the Sheyenne River. In size, the area was roughly 127 miles (204 km) east-west and 188 miles (303 km) north-south, making it nearly 11,000,000 acres (45,000 km^{2}) of prairie and forest.

"Old Crossing" on the Red Lake River (today Huot) was approximately 10 miles (16 km) southwest of Red Lake Falls. It was a river ford and layover site on the "Pembina" or "Woods" trail, of the Red River Trails between Fort Garry in Rupert's Land and St. Paul, Minnesota. (Note: The site at Huot has been known as the "Old Crossing" since well before the treaty negotiations, and is identified with the eastern, or "Woods" branch of the Pembina Trail. Rhoda R. Gilman, Carolyn Gilman & Doborah M. Stultz, The Red River Trails: Oxcart Routes Between St. Paul and the Selkirk Settlement 1820–1870, Minnesota Historical Society, St. Paul, 1979, pages 58–59. A history of Polk County published in 1916 states that Kittson's ox cart trains beginning in 1844, as well as the Woods-Pope expedition of 1849–50, used an earlier "Old Crossing" ford of the Red Lake River near Fisher's Landing, about halfway between the forks of the Red River and the Red Lake River and the "later" crossing at modern Huot. See R.I. Holcombe, ed., Compendium of History and Biography of Polk County, Minnesota, W.G. Bingham & Co., Minneapolis, 1916, pages 47–49. See the Compendium, id. at 49, by 1870 the Fisher's Landing route "seems not to have been much traveled", but the Crow Wing Trail from Pembina to Mendota may originally have crossed there before the Woods Trail was pioneered further east near Huot. Subsequent histories have not pursued the claim of the Compendium that the "Old Crossing Treaty" should have been called the "New Crossing Treaty". Additionally there was another "Old Crossing" on the Red River trails, located on the Ottertail River about 16 miles (26 km) southeast of Breckenridge. See Clarence A. Glasrud, ed., Roy Johnson's Red River Valley, Red River Valley Historical Society, Moorhead, Minn. (1982), pages 173–74.)

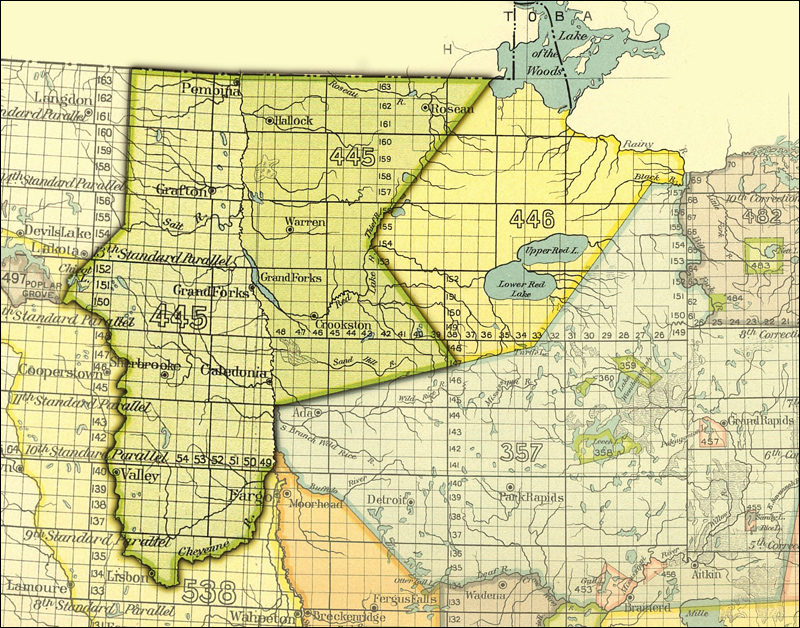
Territory ceded in Treaties of Old Crossing

== History ==
Prior to 1863, Ojibwe/Chippewa and eastern Dakota or Santee "Sioux" tribes had fought over the Red River Valley. The Ojibwe were the main occupants of the region when the first European fur traders arrived in the late 18th century. Development of the Hudson's Bay Company settlement at Fort Garry established trade with St. Paul. The Red River Trails ran between the two terminus points. This led to American settlement in the flat river valley lands.

The pressure to remove "Indians" from the American portion of the Red River Valley originated with U.S. Army Major Samuel Woods expedition in 1849 to locate a site for a military post. He was instructed to proceed north to Pembina, "to hold conferences with the Indians and learn whether their lands in the Red River Valley might be purchased and opened for white settlement." These instructions came from the Secretary of the Interior, Thomas Ewing. Who, with the approval of President Zachary Taylor, suggested the United States acquire the land for the expansion of agricultural settlement. After locating the site for he future Fort Abercrombie, Major Woods continued downriver to Pembina, where he spent 25 days and met first with Dakota and then the Métis from the Pembina Chippewa band as well as members of the Red River Chippewa reaching no land agreements.

Within weeks of the 1851 Treaty of Mendota and the Treaty of Traverse des Sioux with the Santee Sioux, Governor Ramsey negotiated a separate Treaty with the Pembina and Red Lake Chippewa and Metis (September 20, 1851). In it the Red Lake Band and the Pembina Band of Chippewa signed away rights to over 5,000,000 acres (20,000 km^{2}) of Red River Valley land extending 30 miles (48 km) on each side of the Red River. In the face of opposition from Southern states and to obtain ratification of the Sioux treaties, the Northern sponsors of the Chippewa treaty withdrew their support, causing the Senate to deny confirmation, and the Chippewa land cession failed.

With the introduction of steamboat operations on the Red River and plans for railroad development in Northwest Minnesota, the clamor for development and settlement south of the 49th parallel continued unabated throughout the 1850s. Incursions into Chippewa territory on the part of fur traders and others were common. A major trader and Métis state legislator, Joseph Rolette, founded the settlement of "Douglas" at Old Crossing which was designated by the Legislature as the first county seat of Polk County. The Ojibwe objected to the establishment of a town on their territory, and the Legislature moved the county seat to Crookston, but demands for doing something about the "sullen Chippewa" and their claims to the territory continued to mount and by 1862 had risen to a crescendo.

Following the onset of the southern rebellion, Southern State opposition to expansion of free states ceased. In 1862 railroad interests along with promoters of land development asked the U.S. Government to renew efforts to negotiate a "treaty" with the Ojibwe for the cession of the Red River Valley. The chiefs of the Pembina and the Red Lake bands of were invited to treat near the Grand Forks of the Red Lake River and Red River. The Chippewa leaders encamped at the Old Crossing in mid-August, awaiting the U.S. treaty commission that included President Lincoln's private secretary, John George Nicolay. When hostilities of the Sioux Uprising spread into the Red River Valley, the treaty commission was forced to seek refuge at Fort Abercrombie. Treaty goods and cattle were also taken to the fort for safe keeping, but the Santee Sioux raided all of the livestock. After which Abercrombie was attacked multiple times and endured an extended siege. When the Chippewa leaders were informed of why the treaty didn't happen and where their cattle were they offered to fight the Sioux.

The fur traders and steamship operators then renewed efforts to have the government acquire the land.

The main negotiator for the United States in the Treaties of Old Crossing was Alexander Ramsey, ex-Governor and made Indian Commissioner in late spring of 1863.

During the weeks leading up the Old Crossing Treaty, Ramsey held negotiations with the Red Lake and Pembina bands. It was not Ramsey's first attempt to obtain cession of the Red River Valley from the Ojibwe. He treated with the Red Lake and Pembina Bands to sign the unratified treaty at Pembina in 1851. That treaty ceded over of 5,000,000 acres (20,000 km^{2}) of the Red River Valley to the United States for about five cents an acre.

== 1863 treaty ==
On September 21, 1863, Ramsey arrived escorted by troops of the 8th Minn. Additionally accompanied by a battery of the 3rd Minn. light Artillery and 90 assorted wagons, 340 mules, 180 horses, and 55 oxen. John Nicolay did not participate in 1863 as he had already departed Washington to represent Lincoln at another treaty signing in Colorado. The Pembina band arrived a couple days after Ramsey, and negotiations ensued. Initially, Ramsey offered $20,000 for a "right of passage", that the Chippewa roundly rejected. Over the next several days, a psychological battle of wills pitted the Ojibwe negotiators, most of whom disclaimed any interest in selling their land, against the impatient Ramsey, who feigned disinterest in acquiring their land and invited a counteroffer. Eventually, on October 2, 1863, Ramsey and his co-commissioner, Ashley C. Morril, induced the chiefs, headmen and warriors of the Pembina Band and Red Lake Band to sign the Treaty of Old Crossing (1863).

The United States treaty negotiators had overtly misrepresented the purpose and effect of the proposed treaty as merely conveying a "right of passage" over the Ojibwe lands to the United States. The United States intention to bring in settlers as well as the railroad had been an established policy for years, as was plainly stated in newspapers and governmental reports of the time. Governor Ramsey's journal of the treaty negotiations contained his speech to the assembled Ojibwe in which he, as a trained lawyer and experienced politician and Indian negotiator, directly misrepresented the purpose and intent of the treaty:

Now, there is growing up a trade of considerable importance between the British settlements on the north and the American settlements on the south. ... Now, this is a trade which cannot and must not be interrupted. And their Great Father, feeling this, and desirous to prevent any trouble between his white and red people, has sent us here to come to some understanding with you about it. Their Great Father has no especial desire to get possession of their lands. He does not want their lands at all if they do not want to part with them. He has more land now than he knows what to do with. He simply wishes that his people should enjoy the privilege of traveling through their country on steamboats and wagons unmolested

Even after the initial proposal for a mere right of way was rejected, he was representing that if they sold their land, the Ojibwe could still occupy it and hunt on it for a long time.

The text of the treaty presented by Ramsey and Morril in fact ceded Ojibwe control and ownership of all of the territory (Article 2) to the United States, while "compensating" the signing bands with annuity payments of $20,000 per year to be divided up and paid to individual members of the two bands over a period of twenty years (Article 3). It provided a mechanism for non-Indian claims against the signatory Ojibwe bands to be reviewed by a commission appointed by the President of the United States in consultation with the Ojibwe bands, and appropriated $100,000 to be used to pay claims of individuals (whites) for past Indian wrongs, while relieving the Red Lake Band and Pembina Band of the threat of "punishment for past offenses". (Article 4). It left the "chiefs" of two of the bands with "reservations" consisting of 640 acres (one square mile) each (Article 9) and provided other direct inducements to the "chiefs" in the form of direct cash payments (Article 5). In lieu of annuity payments, it also provided for payment to the Métis or "half-breed" relatives of the Chippewa (Ojibwe) who were citizens of the United States the right to obtain scrip entitling the holder to claim 160 acres (0.65 km^{2}) anywhere within the ceded territory or elsewhere that was opened up for homestead by the United States (Article 8).

1863 treaty signatory representatives

Affiliation	Title as Recorded	Name / Spelling in Treaty, (& English Translation)
Red Lake	Chief of Red Lake	Moozomoo / Mons-o-mo (Moose Dung)
Red Lake	Chief of Red Lake	Wawaashkinike / Kaw-wash-ke-ne-kay (Crooked Arm)
Red Lake	Chief of Red Lak(e)	Esiniwab / Ase-e-ne-wub (Little Rock)
Pembina	Chief of Pembina	Miskomakwa / Mis-co-muk-quoh (Red Bear)
Pembina	Chief of Pembina	Esens / Ase-anse (Little Shell)
Red Lake	Warrior of Red Lake	Miskokonaye / Mis-co-co-noy-a (Red Robe)
Red Lake	Warrior of Red Lake	Gichi-anishinaabe / Ka-che-un-ish-e-naw-bay (Big Indian)
Red Lake	Warrior of Red Lake	Niiyogiizhig / Neo-ki-zhick (Four Skies)
Pembina	Warrior of Pembina	Niibini-gwiingwa'aage / Nebene-quin-gwa-hawegaw (Summer Wolverine)
Pembina	Warrior of Pembina	Joseph Gornon
Pembina	Warrior of Pembina	Joseph Montreuil
Red Lake	Head Warrior of Red Lake	Mezhakiiyaash / May-shue-e-yaush (Dropping Wind)
Red Lake	Warrior of Red Lake	Min-du-wa-wing (Berry Hunter)
Red Lake	Chief of Red Lake	Naagaanigwanebi / Naw-gaun-a-gwan-abe (Leading Feather)

"Signed in the Presence Of:"

Affiliation	Title as Recorded	Name (& English Translation)
Unstated (Red Lake)	Special Interpreter	Paul H. Beaulieu
Unstated	None	Peter Roy
United States	United States Interpreter	T. A. Warren
United States (assumed)	Secretary	J. A. Wheelock
United States (assumed)	Secretary	Reuben Ottman
United States (Minnesota)	Major (Eighth Regiment Minnesota Volunteers)	George A. Camp
United States (Minnesota)	Captain Company K (Eighth Regiment Minnesota Volunteers)	William T. Rockwood
United States (Minnesota)	Captain Company L (First Regiment Minnesota Mounted Rangers)	P. B. Davy
United States (Minnesota)	Second Lieutenant (Third Minnesota Battery)	G. M. Dwelle
United States (Minnesota)	Surgeon (Eighth Regiment Minnesota Volunteers)	F. Rieger
United States (Minnesota)	First Lieutenant Company L (First Minnesota Mounted Rangers)	L. S. Kidder
Unstated	None	Sam B. Abbe
Unstated	None	C. A. Kuffer
Unstated (Red Lake)	None	Pierre x Bottineau

== The 1864 amendments ==
Afterwards, it was stated that the Ojibwe signatories of the 1863 treaty did not know the character of the treaty they had made and, in the words of the Episcopal Bishop Henry Whipple, it was "from beginning to end a fraud...". It is said that the principal "translator" involved in the negotiations, Paul H. Beaulieu, was familiar only with Dakota languages and the "Chippewa Métis" creole language and not with the Ojibwe words and meanings as used by the Red Lake Band and other non-Métis Ojibwe people. Even if the English used by the negotiators was accurately translated to the Ojibwe negotiators, however, the effect was the same—the treaty ceded away over 10,000,000 acres (40,000 km^{2}) of land for a total consideration of just over $500,000, or 5 cents an acre. Governor Ramsey bragged that it was the lowest price per acre ever paid for Indian land cessions in the history of the United States.

The United States Senate refused to ratify the treaty on the grounds that it was "too generous to the chiefs", and sent back an amended treaty with the demand that the Ojibwe capitulate to the revisions. The Senate eliminated language which would have diverted unused portions of the $100,000 indemnity fund to the chiefs after settlement of all just claims, and instead provided for any unused funds to be added to the annuity payments to be distributed directly to members of the bands on a per capita basis. It also added a proviso to Article 8, prohibiting any assignment of the half-breed scrip until after the patent had been issued to the original claimant, after 5 years of proving up the claim.

As a result of the unilateral alterations to the unratified treaty imposed by the Senate, several original Indian signers of the 1863 treaty refused to sign the amended version. Nonetheless, the "treaty" was re-executed by the United States Commissioners along with certain representatives of the bands who had been taken to Washington, D.C. for this purpose, all of whom signed the amended treaty on April 12, 1864. This version of the treaty was then signed by President Abraham Lincoln, in early May 1864.

After negotiating the initial Treaty of Old Crossing in 1863, Ramsey had been appointed to the United States Senate before the follow-up treaty negotiations in 1864, and probably played a role in approving the ensuing revisions to the treaty he had just negotiated.

== 1864 supplemental treaty ==
One of the dissatisfied chiefs from the Red Lake Band recruited Bishop Whipple to assist in an effort to enhance the benefits of the treaty to the Red Lake and Pembina Ojibwe. This resulted in a supplemental treaty, sometimes called the Treaty of Old Crossing (1864) but entirely negotiated in Washington, D.C., which in some ways enhanced the benefits of the treaty to the signatory bands and in other ways assured that much of the indemnity fund would never find its way back to the tribes.

The 1864 supplement reduced the $20,000 annuity to $15,000, but specifically allocated $10,000 per year to the Red Lake band and $5,000 per year to the Pembina band (to be distributed per capita directly to individual members of each band). It eliminated the fixed term of 20 years and provided for the annuity to be paid "during the pleasure of the President". An additional annuity payment of $12,000 ($8,000 for the Red Lake band and $4,000 for the Pembina band) was established for a period of 15 years, with these payments to be made to the bands in common for agricultural assistance and materials to make clothing and "other useful articles". The United States also committed to provide a sawmill, to furnish a blacksmith, physician, miller and farmer, and to provide various blacksmithing and carpentry materials and tools with an annual value of $1500 over a period of 15 years. In effect, these changes increased the price paid by the United States for the ceded land to about 6 cents an acre.

Other changes made to the terms of the 1863 treaty in the supplemental treaty of 1864 have provoked ongoing controversy among Ojibwe and white historians alike. The $100,000 indemnity fund was reallocated, to provide that $25,000 would be immediately distributed to the chiefs of said bands "through their agent". The balance of the funds were specifically earmarked for the satisfaction of specific claims for "depredations committed by said Indians" on Euro-American traders' goods at the Red Lake River and for "exactions forcibly levied by [said Indians]" on the steamship operations on the Red River, and the remainder was to be allocated pro rata in satisfaction of other claims. The provision for collaborative review and settlement of these claims by an appointed commission in consultation with the chiefs of the Ojibwe bands was eliminated, with the determination of claims left entirely to the "agent for said bands". In effect, the revisions transferred control of the indemnity fund to the white Indian agent and assured that none of the funds would be allocated to the Indians themselves.

The 1864 supplemental treaty also altered the provisions for half-breed scrip, restricting the holder to claims on land within the ceded territory, while eliminating restrictions on assignment or required prove-up of claims. The Red Lake Band has renounced these aspects of the treaty, contending that none of the purported signatories for the Red Lake Band were legitimate leaders or had authority to speak for or sign away their ancestral lands, and that virtually all of the benefited Métis claimants were non-citizen relatives of members of the Pembina band who used the scrip to acquire timberlands formerly belonging to the Red Lake Band.

=== Signatory representatives ===
Affiliation	Title as Recorded	Name / Spelling on Treaty, (& English Translation)
Red Lake	Principle Red Lake Chief	Medweganoonind / May-dwa-gua-no-nind (He That Is Spoken To)
Red Lake	Red Lake Chief	Moozomoo / Mons-o-mo (Moose Dung)
Red Lake	Red Lake Chief	Esiniwab / Ase-e-ne-wub (Little Rock)
Pembina	Principle Pembina Chief	Miskomakwa / Mis-co-muk-quah (Red Bear)
Red Lake	Red Lake Headman	Naagaanigwanebi / Naw-gon-e-gwo-nabe (Leading Wing-Feather)
Red Lake	Red Lake War[r]ior	Gwiiwizens / Que-we-zance (The Boy)
Red Lake	Red Lake Headman	Mezhakiiyaash / May-zha-ke-osh (Dropping Wind)
Red Lake	Red Lake Headman	Bwaanens / Bwa-ness (Little Sioux, recorded as "Little Shoe")
Red Lake	Red Lake Headman	Waabaanikweyaash / Wa-bon-e-qua-osh (White Hair[ed Wind])
Pembina	Pembina Headman	Dibishko-giizhig / Te-bish-co-ge-shick (Equals the Sky, recorded as "Equal Sky")
Red Lake	Red Lake Warrior	Dibishko-bines / Te-besh-co-be-ness (Like a Bird, recorded as "Straight Bird")
Red Lake	Red Lake Warrior	"Osh-shay-o-sick" (No interpretation)
Red Lake	Red Lake Warrior	Zesegaakamigishkam / Sa-sa-goh-cum-ick-ish-cum (He That Makes the Ground Tremble)
Red Lake	Red Lake Warrior	"Kay-tush-ke-wub-e-tung"
Pembina	Pembina Warrior	Ayaanjigwanebi / I-inge-e-gaun-abe (Be Molting Feathers, recorded as "Wants Feathers")
Red Lake	Red Lake Warrior	Gwiiwizhenzhish / Que-we-zance-ish (Bad Boy)

== Legacy ==
Governor Ramsey virtually admitted the fraud he had perpetrated in his letter transmitting the final treaty to Congress for ratification, saying:

I stated to them very plainly, that if the offers were not agreeable to them they should make another proposition. The Great Father had several times offered to purchase the land, not because he wanted it for settlement—at least during the lifetime of the youngest of them, but because he wanted a free passage over it ...

As Governor Ramsey was well aware, the treaty did not merely grant "a free passage". By the text of the treaty, the signatory Ojibwe bands did "hereby cede, sell, and convey to the United States all their right, title, and interest in and to all the lands now owned and claimed by them ... within the following described boundaries:". The intended effect of the treaty on the part of the United States negotiators in fact was to extinguish all Ojibwe interests in the land for the benefit of the United States. This in fact was the stated objective of the treaty in all of Ramsey's communications on the subject other than his statements to the Ojibwe during the negotiations.

Most of the indemnity fund wound up in the hands of Norman Kittson, who had pioneered steamship operations on the Red River as a means of handling a burgeoning trade with the Hudson's Bay Company. The Ojibwe had accused Kittson of trespassing on their territory, cutting timber for fuel and starting forest fires. At one point they had demanded tribute for the continued right to pass along the river—the "exactions forcibly levied" referred to in the text of the treaty. But Kittson's shipping operations were already faltering as the Hudson's Bay Company withdrew from dependence on supply through the St. Paul and the Red River routes and re-established direct shipping from England via Hudson Bay, and the Sioux Uprising effectively ended the trade for most of the 1860s. The treaty indemnity payments thus may be seen as a politically inspired bailing out of Kittson from a losing position, using the excuse of Indian "depredations" which had been no more than a demand for payment by the Ojibwe for the right of passage now being exacted from them.

Although the Ojibwe had no involvement in the Dakota War of 1862, white agents in the press and the government freely associated the Ojibwe with the Dakota, or Sioux, and overtly argued for reduced benefits to the "Indians" due to the depredations committed on white settlers in the "Sioux Uprising". The leading historian of North Dakota, Elwyn B. Robinson, described the treaty as satisfying the "sullen Chippewa" who had "wanted to sell their land to the United States" and who had "plundered" fur traders' property and "threatened to stop the steamboat" if their long-frustrated desires were thwarted. Even as soon as 1899, Euro-Americans were characterizing the 1863 and 1864 Treaties of Old Crossing as "ending the trouble" caused by the Sioux Uprising. The official Red Lake County history tour guide still characterizes the treaty as a "peace treaty", as does the centennial history of Red Lake County, the split-off portion of the original Polk County in which the Old Crossing now is located. Describing the monument erected in 1932 to commemorate the Old Crossing Treaty, it states:

Here at the "Old Crossing" is a monument which commemorates a peace pact....As the descendants of these self-same Indians [i.e., the Ojibwe] pause in its shadow they may well say our forefathers kept their faith, and be proud that this was done.

Ojibwe negotiators at Old Crossing denied any interest in selling the lands of their people.

A standard Minnesota history work states:

Though the treaties ceding the Red River Valley followed shortly after the Sioux War, they were not in any direct sense a consequence of the outbreak. In fact, commissioners had been sent out from Washington in 1862 to negotiate a treaty, but the plan had been interrupted by the Indian war.

Norman Kittson, the long-time supplier of the Hudson's Bay Company, and the steamship operator who probably benefited most directly from the treaty, had been a partner of "Jolly Joe" Rolette in the abortive effort to develop the townsite of Douglas, the "Magnificent City of the West", on Ojibwe Land at the Old Crossing. Kittson, "Jolly Joe" and Pierre Bottineau previously had pioneered the Red River cart trains that supplied the Selkirk Colony and the Hudson's Bay Company in the Red River Colony. (Note: See Virgil Benoit, The French-Canadian Presence in the Northwest and the Very Early Beginnings of Red Lake Falls and Red Lake County) Rolette became their personal representative in the Minnesota legislature.

Henry Sibley, the marauding militia leader that carried a punitive expedition against the Sioux in the eastern part of Dakota Territory and throughout the Red River Valley, was a former partner in the fur trade with "Jolly Joe's father, "Old Joe" Rolette, and later recruited Norman Kittson himself as his partner in the fur trade and the supply of Hudson's Bay Company and Fort Garry. Ramsey was the first governor of the State of Minnesota, and had previously served as the first governor of the Territory and its delegate to Congress. Ramsey was appointed to the U.S. Senate immediately after his service in negotiating several treaties, including the Old Crossing Treaty, whereby virtually all Indian rights to territory outside reservations in Minnesota were finally eliminated in 1863.

It was Kittson who invited the Woods-Pope reconnaissance of the Red River Valley in 1849 and the initial sounding out of the Ojibwe about their willingness to part with their land for United States settlement purposes, who met the expedition and provided critical information about the lay of the land and its inhabitants, and whose clerk, the younger Rolette, provided Woods and Pope lodgings and entertainment while they engaged the Red Lake and Pembina bands in discussions in 1849. John Pope's report produced after the 1849–50 Woods-Pope expedition extolled the agricultural potential of the Red River Valley. This led directly to Ramsey's first negotiation with the Ojibwe to obtain a cession of the Red River Valley—the unratified Pembina Treaty of 1851—which had been directly facilitated by Henry Sibley's securing of a Congressional allocation of funds to finance Ramsey's negotiations in Pembina and by Kittson's urging of treaty negotiations to obtain Red River Valley lands for white settlement from the "reluctant tribesmen" of the Pembina and Red Lake Bands. In that case, also, Kittson had stood to gain $30,000 in payments for alleged debts owed to him by the Ojibwe.

John Pope was surveying the still-unceded Red River Valley for the United States Army Corps of Topographic Engineers in 1858 when he determined that the river would be suitable for steamboats. Soon after, Norman Kittson and James J. Hill started their steamboat operations on the river, to supplement their already substantial ox cart trade. It was Kittson, as well, who got caught at Georgetown with a load of trade goods when the Sioux Uprising intervened, and who encountered the hungry and disgruntled Ojibwe encamped at Grand Forks, waiting for the United States commissioners who never arrived with the promised trade goods and provisions during the planned treaty negotiations, in 1862; the Ojibwe encamped at Grand Forks confiscated some of his cargo for food and thereby committed the "depredations by said Indians" for which Kittson later collected nearly $100,000 in indemnity payments under the treaty negotiated the next year.

Pope and Sibley were carrying out their military expeditions in the vicinity while Ramsey negotiated the Treaty of 1863. Sibley, who had hired Pierre Bottineau as a scout and agent throughout the 1840s and 1850s during his years as a fur trader in the Red River Valley and Minnesota River Valley, also engaged Bottineau as his scout in the expedition against the Sioux of 1862–63.

Bottineau had worked for Sibley and Kittson for years, had accompanied Sioux and Ojibwe tribal delegates to Washington, D.C. as a "trusted interpreter" in 1849–50, immediately after the Woods-Pope foray to Pembina, had guided the first Ramsey expedition to Pembina in 1851 that resulted in the initial unratified treaty ceding Ojibwe claims to the Red River Valley, and had guided any number of government and military surveys, railroad surveys, sportsmen, journalists, settlers and townsite promoters around the Red River Valley and other points south, east and west, both before and after the Ojibwe and Dakota ceded their territory for white settlement. Bottineau himself had a hand in the founding of several townsites in Minnesota in the late 1850s, including the town of La Fayette, on the east side of the Red River of the North, in still unceded Ojibway territory, in 1857.

Bottineau now was engaged by Ramsey (escorted by Sibley) as one of his interpreters in treaty negotiations at the Old Crossing in 1863. In this capacity, Bottineau signed the treaty himself, and his nominal role as an interpreter often is characterized as "negotiator", probably for good reason. At the same time as Sibley loaned Ramsey the services of his guide and interpreter, Sibley also provided two companies of dragoons to escort Ramsey to the Old Crossing treaty grounds in late September 1863.

Soon after the treaty was consummated, the principal beneficiary, Sibley's former partner in the fur trade, Norman Kittson, and Kittson's current partner in the steamboat and railroad business, James J. Hill, developed the first railroads through the Red River Valley and re-established the steamboat traffic on the Red River of the North. Bottineau went on to found the town of Red Lake Falls and recruited French-Canadian immigrants to settle the recently ceded Ojibwe lands in nearby Louisville Township, where he also founded the townsite of Huot, the site of the Old Crossing Treaty negotiations as well as the former location of the nonexistent town of Douglas as first county seat of Polk County.

== See also ==
- Dakota War of 1862
- Huot, Minnesota
