= Abercrombie Township, Richland County, North Dakota =

Coordinates: 46°24′18″N 96°47′16″W

Abercrombie Township is a township in Richland County, North Dakota, United States. Its population at the 2020 Census was 256.

== History ==
Abercrombie Township was organized on March 12, 1883, when still part of the Dakota Territory. Settlement in the area began in the late 1860s and early 1870s, mainly by people of Scandinavian ancestry. Fort Abercrombie, first built in 1858 and rebuilt in 1861, was a prominent fixture in the township.
