= Dorothy, Minnesota =

Former unincorporated community in Minnesota, US

Dorothy
- Former unincorporated community
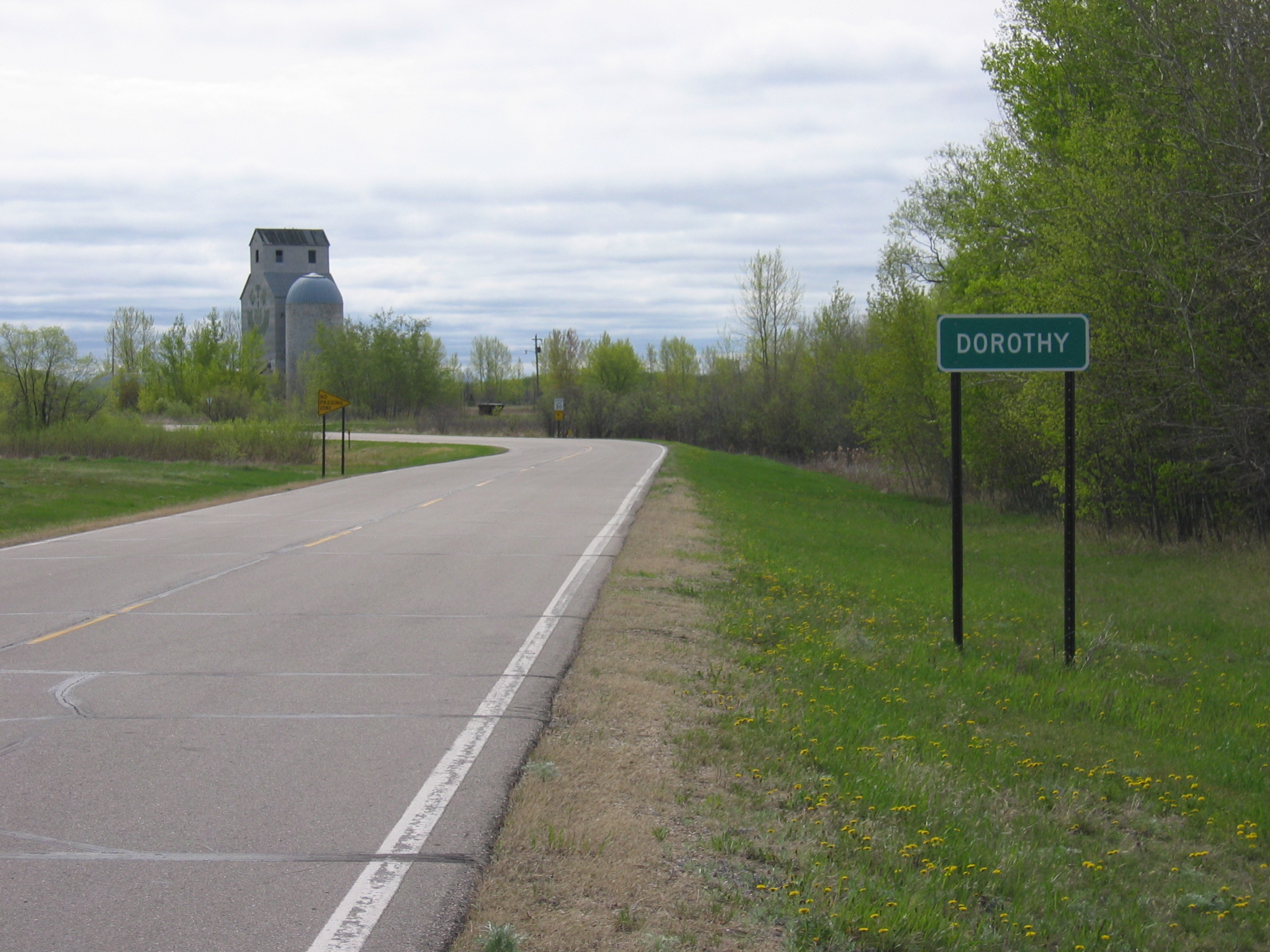
- What was left of Dorothy in 2007

- Location within Minnesota Location within the United States
- Coordinates: 47°55′40″N 96°26′48″W
- Country: United States
- State: Minnesota
- County: Red Lake
- Elevation: 991 ft (302 m)
- Time zone: UTC-6 (Central (CST))
  - Summer (DST): UTC-5 (CDT)
- Area code: 218
- GNIS feature ID: 642897

Dorothy is an unincorporated community in Section 5, Louisville Township, Red Lake County, Minnesota, United States.

Dorothy was initially established as a railroad station in 1916–17, after the Northern Pacific Railway extended its line from Tilden Junction to Winnipeg and built a spur through Red Lake Falls. The new town sucked away what was left of the historic river crossing town, Huot, and for a time sputtered toward prosperity, boasting a grain elevator, a Catholic church, a school and several houses.

The post office in Dorothy was first established February 11, 1898, with Joseph H. Mathews as postmaster. It was finally discontinued in 1945.

The Federal Writers' Project reported in 1938 that the town had a population of 25, and "a beautiful church with stained-glass windows". In 1973, the railroad was abandoned and the grain elevator closed, and with it, the town's reason for existence was gone. By 2007, the church had been abandoned and appeared to be in use as a residence.

On October 24, 2014, the old church caught fire and burned to the ground in a conflagration that apparently started after embers from a pile of leaves a property owner was burning nearby blew towards the building, igniting the structure, which was a total loss.

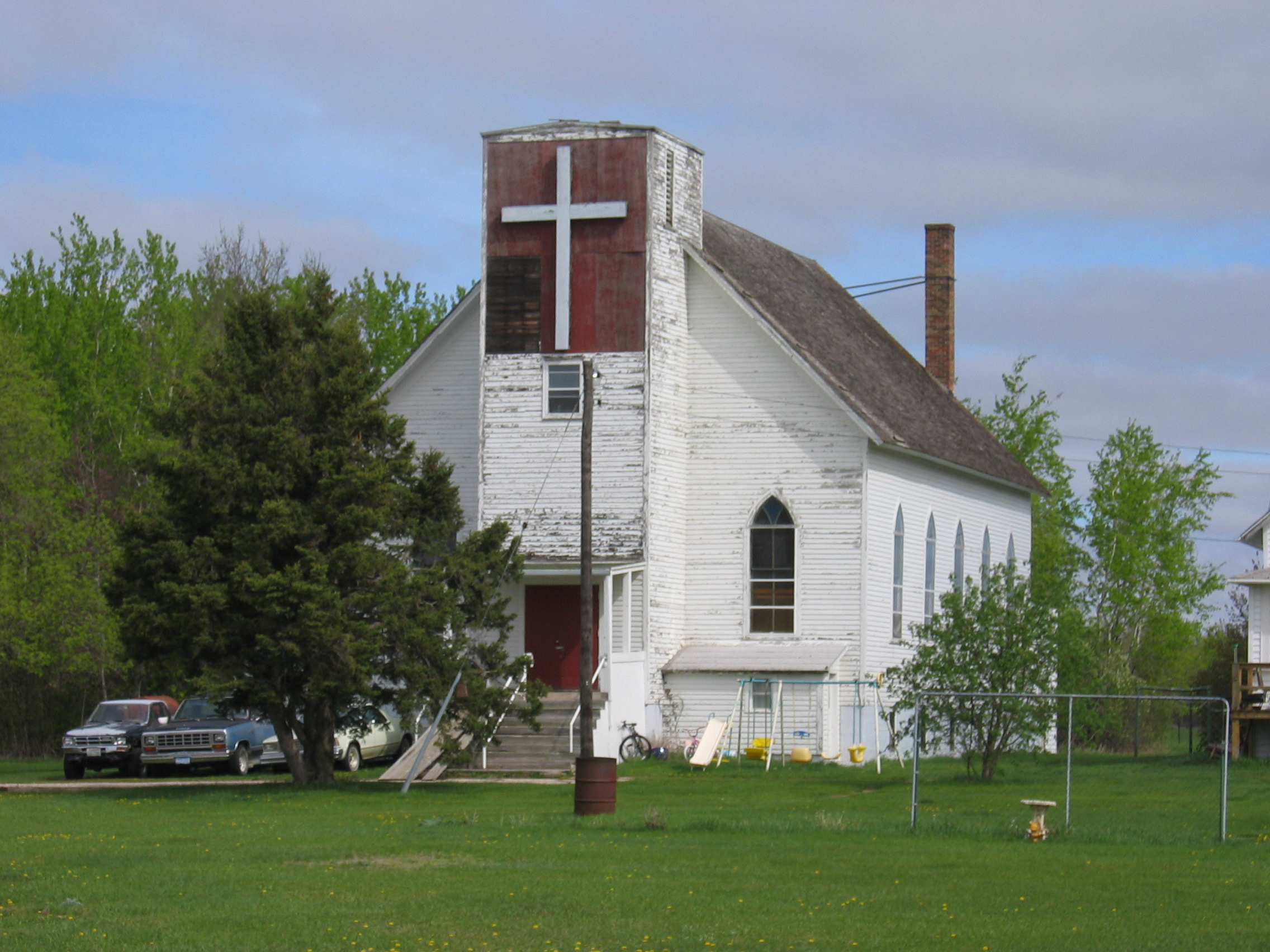
St. Dorothy's Church in 2007

== Sources ==
- Red Lake County Bicentennial Committee, A History of Red Lake County, Minnesota (Taylor Publishing Co., 1976), at pp. 91–95.
- Federal Writers' Project, Minnesota: A State Guide (Works Progress Administration, 1938), at p. 338.
- The Post Offices of Minnesota, Alan H. Patera and John S. Gallagher; (The Depot, Burtonsville, Maryland, 1978), at pp. 153, 268
- The Erskine Echo, Erskine, Minn., Thursday, Oct. 30, 2014, at p. 4
