= Grain Belt Brewery =

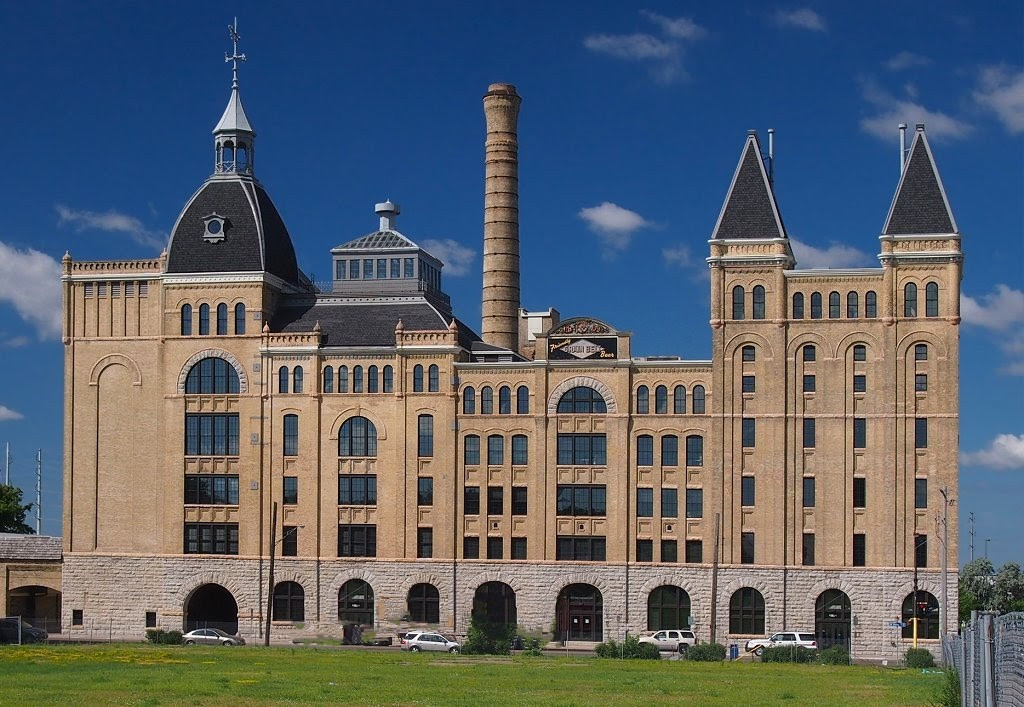
- The Grain Belt Brewery building
- Interactive map of the Grain Belt Brewery area
- Alternative names: Minneapolis Brewing Company

General information
- Architectural style: Richardsonian Romanesque
- Location: Jct. of Marshall St. and 13th Ave. NE. Minneapolis, Minnesota, US
- Coordinates: 44°59′59″N 93°16′13″W
- Year built: 1891–1892
- Opened: July 1892
- Renovated: 2002
- Cost: $500,000 ($17.9 million in 2025)
- Owner: Grain Belt Brewing (1892–1975); I.J. Enterprises (1975–1989); City of Minneapolis (1989–2001); Ryan Companies (2001–present)

Technical details
- Floor count: 6

Design and construction
- Architects: William L. Lehle; Frederick W. Wolff
- Minneapolis Brewing Company
- U.S. National Register of Historic Places
- Minneapolis Historic Landmark
- Part of: Minneapolis Brewing Company Historic District
- NRHP reference No.: 90000988

Significant dates
- Added to NRHP: June 21, 1990
- Designated MHL: August 1977

The Grain Belt Brewery, also known as the Minneapolis Brewing Company, is a former brewery building in Northeast, Minneapolis, United States, located north of Broadway St. NE on the east bank of the Mississippi River. Originally the headquarters of the eponymous Minneapolis Brewing Company on its opening in 1892, the building has four distinct architectural styles in homage to the four companies that came together to build it. The building ceased operating as a brewery in 1975, and sat empty in disrepair for many years. After many redevelopment proposals fell through, the property was purchased by Ryan Companies in 2001, was remodeled into offices, and reopened in 2002. It is considered to be one of the city's "most striking industrial buildings from the turn of the century."

== History ==
=== Brewery ===
German immigrant John Orth built a brewery on the current site of Marshall St. and 13th Ave. NE in 1850. In 1890, during a time period when large mergers were becoming common in the brewing industry, the John Orth Brewing Company and three others—Heinreich Brewing Association, F. D. Noerenberg Brewing Company, and Germania Brewing Association—jointly created the Minneapolis Brewing and Malting Company, and the Orth brewery was the chosen location for the principal plant for the combined company. Within a few years, the brewery took on the "Grain Belt" brand, referring to the vast fields of Minnesota, Iowa, Wisconsin, and the Dakotas as "America's Grain Belt".

A building permit for the new collaborative brewery was acquired in June 1891. Completed in July 1892 at a cost of $500,000 ($17.9 million in 2025), the L-shaped brewery was designed by Frederick Wolff and William Lehle. The brewery front features four distinct sections, as an homage that four companies merged to create the brewery. An elevator was added to one side in 1904, corrupting the symbolism. The brewery rapidly grew to be one of the largest in Minnesota, second only to Hamm's Brewery in St. Paul. Production was greater than a million barrels per year by the 1960s. However, with competition from larger, national breweries proving to be too great, the company fell into financial difficulties and was sold in 1975 to Irwin L. Jacobs under his company I.J. Enterprises.

=== Preservation and renovation ===
From 1975 to 1987, the building remained vacant and unused. In response to attempts to demolish the building and redevelop the site, it was designated a historic landmark for preservation by the Minneapolis City Council in August 1977. Its historic status allowed the City of Minneapolis to deny permits for its demolition in 1977 and again in 1986. Various redevelopment plans for the now-historic building—including a duty-free foreign trade zone, a luxury hotel, a Shakespearean theater, and an aquarium—were put forward. By 1986, the Minneapolis Community Development Agency concluded that the ability to redevelop the building "were not optimistic" due to vandalism and degradation over the years of inoccupancy, and demolition was considered the best option.

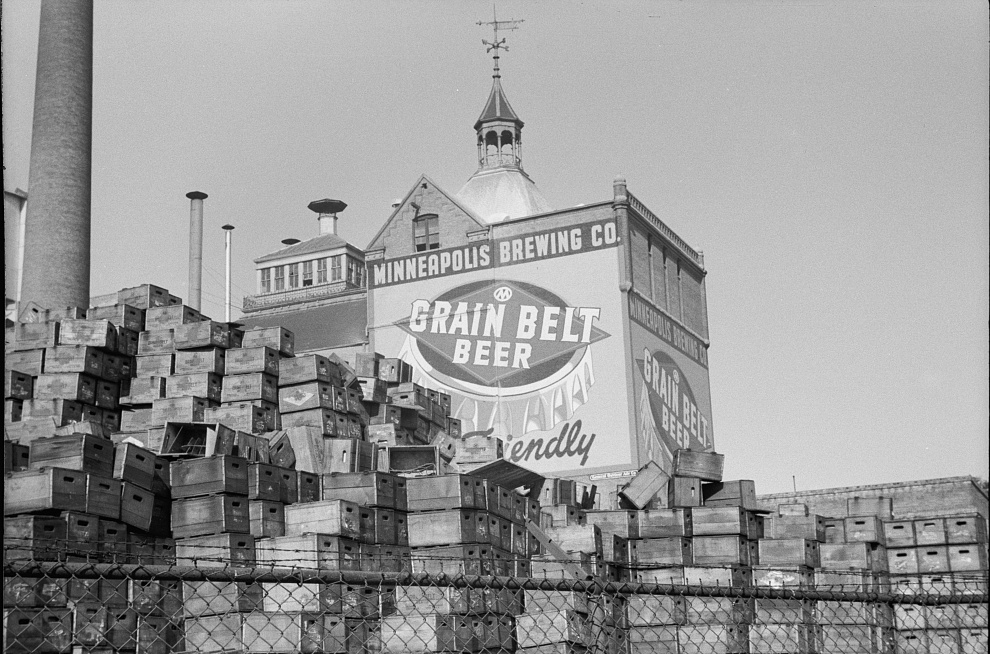
The brewery from behind in 1939

While the city had previously declined a donation of the building due to the predicted operating costs between $100,000 and $300,000 per year, Minneapolis purchased the building in 1989 for $4.85 million ($12.6 million in 2025) after realizing the rent agreements that came with other property in the deal might offset the costs. It was added to the National Register of Historic Places in 1990. However, by 1993, $1 million ($2.23 million in 2025) had been spent simply to keep the building from collapsing and no developer had come forward yet. City council member Tony Scallon called voting for the purchase the "biggest political mistake I ever made". Nonetheless, it was acknowledged that any attempts to tear the iconic building down would be met by people standing in front of the bulldozers.

In 1995, the Guthrie Theater considered developing the property into offices and a scene shop, but financial considerations caused them to back out within a few months. A deal with Aveda seemed near in early 1997, but by the end of the year that one also fell through.

In October 1999, Ryan Companies expressed interest in buying the building. They proposed a $20.3 million ($38 million in 2025) plan to develop the building into offices for RSP Architects. By May 2000, a proposal was in place where Ryan Companies would purchase the brewhouse for a nominal fee of $1 and the city would assist with $14 million of the $19 million in planned redevelopment costs, with the remaining $5 million being funded by Ryan. The sale was finalized in May 2001, (Note: It is unclear whether the previously mentioned sale price of $1 was the final price.) and the renovated offices opened in 2002.

== Structure ==
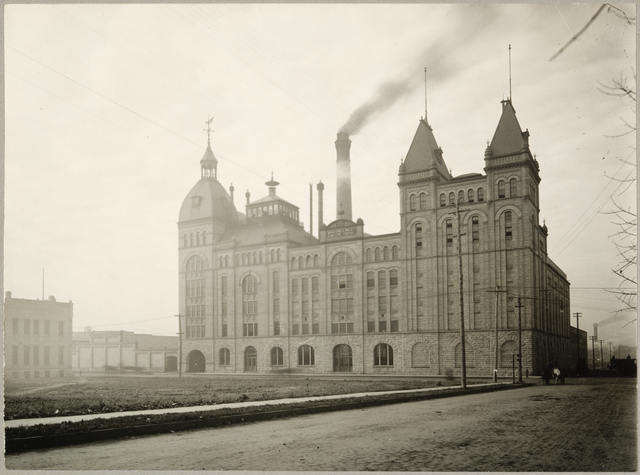
The building in 1900, prior to the addition of the elevator

The Richardsonian Romanesque brewhouse stands between five and six stories high. While originally divided into four architecturally unique sections in homage to the four original breweries, a fifth section was added in 1904. The northeastern-most and tallest section of the building, on the corner of 13th Ave NE and Marshall St NE, (Note: The right-most section when facing the building from across Marshall St. NE (as seen in the article photos)) was used for fermentation and refrigeration and features twin towers with hipped roofs. The next section to the southeast is five stories high, featuring flat lintels, segmental arches, semicircular windows and a semicircular arch, and is topped with a sign stating "FRIENDLY GRAIN BELT BEER". The third section, used for mixing and cooking, is also five stories and is topped by a square, hipped belvedere. It also features parapet walls on the outer edges, decorated with finials. The fourth original section, originally containing the grain bins, is six stories high with a four-sided mansard dome topped off with a steel lantern. The fifth section added in 1904 is attached to the southern wall of the fourth section; it is a six-story malt-elevator topped with a corbeled cornice.

== Historic district ==
Beyond the main edifice, several other buildings are part of the historic district. The Wagon Shed and Shops to the south of the brewhouse has become the Pierre Bottineau branch of Hennepin County Library; the Bottling House to the north, including the 1969 addition, now serves as a space for artist studios.

== See also ==
- Grain Belt Beer Sign
- National Register of Historic Places listings in Hennepin County, Minnesota
