= Pembina Trail =

19th-century foot trail in North Dakota, US, and Manitoba, Canada

The Pembina Trail was a 19th century trail used by Métis and European settlers to travel between Fort Garry and Fort Pembina in what is today the Canadian province of Manitoba and U.S. state of North Dakota. The trail followed the west bank of the Red River. There were many alternative routes depending on conditions and which communities travellers wanted to avoid. The Pembina Trail was the part of the larger Red River Trail network and is no longer in use today as a trail, however, a modified version of it is now the Lord Selkirk and Pembina Highways in Manitoba.

== History ==
The Pembina Trail and network of Red River Trails have been in regular use since at least 1823. As communities along the Red River between Fort Garry and Pembina grew, churches were built and residents began to communicate with other communities, resulting in increased travel to and from. The Pembina Trail was not only used for travel between Fort Garry and Pembina for social or political reasons, it was also used as a main route to access the Red River Trails. This connection is important because it allowed groups of Métis and settlers to access the ever decreasing populations of bison on the prairies.

The trail began in Fort Garry and made its way south, passing through the 49th parallel North, or the Canada–United States border. As Métis had varied histories with many other Indigenous communities, the trail would often deviate to avoid coming in contact with any enemies. A letter written by Father Joseph Provencher provides evidence for another reason settlers and Métis may visit Pembina: to avoid the harsh winter climate of Fort Garry.

Mr. Dumoulin is on the prairies about Pembina. He is following the bois brules (Note: bois brules is a pejorative term and should not be used.) [Métis], who almost entirely abandon the post when they leave for the hunt, being obliged to go in large bands to protect themselves from the insults of the Sioux, who had not done any harm since I wrote last. He is busy instructing them how to prepare the infants for baptism; he also says Mass on Sundays. I have not yet made the trip to Pembina. The journey is not without danger; perhaps I shall spend the winter, or part of it, there. Life is easier there (Nute 1942:373).

Cultural mixing was prominent along the trails, as these routes passed through numerous Indigenous and settler communities. As groups passed, they would network and build relationships, which was fundamental to their success as a community. This cultural difference created a duality to records, as some were written through a Métis or Indigenous perspective, while most were recorded through a settler perspective.

Once in Pembina, travellers had access to the three major routes of the Red River Trails network, the East Plains Trail, the West Plains Trail and the Woods Trail. The Woods Trail is often confused as the Pembina Trail, however they were part of two separate networks. A more direct version of the Pembina Trail is now a four-lane paved road that serves as the Lord Selkirk Highway (Highway 75) and Pembina Highway that run along the Red River between Winnipeg and Canada–United States border near Pembina.

== See also ==
- Red River Trails
- Métis in Canada
- Métis in the United States
- Bison Hunt
- Manitoba Highway 75
