= Pierre Bottineau =

American Métis frontiersman (1817-1895)

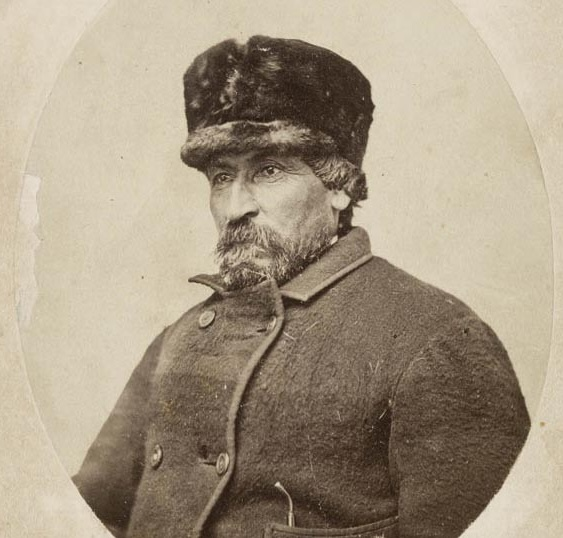
- Bottineau in 1855
- Born: January 1, 1817
- Died: July 26, 1895 (aged 78); Red Lake Falls, Minnesota
- Known for: Frontiersman
- Spouse(s): Genevieve Larance, Martha C. Gervais
- Parents: Charles Joseph Bottineau (father); Margaret Ah-dik-Songab (Clear Sky) (mother)

Pierre Bottineau was a Métis guide, interpreter, and landowner who played a central role in the settlement of parts of Minnesota and North Dakota during the nineteenth century. He helped link Native nations, fur trade companies, and United States officials through his work on expeditions and treaties.

== Early life and family ==
Pierre Bottineau was born in 1816 at a hunting camp at Bear Point near the mouth of the Turtle River, close to the later site of Grand Forks, North Dakota. His father, Charles Joseph Bottineau, came from French Canada and worked in the fur trade, and his mother, Margaret Ah-dik-Songab (Clear Sky), was Ojibwe. Bottineau grew up along the Red River around Pembina and the nearby English and Métis settlements.

During his life Bottineau learned many languages, including French, English, Dakota, Ojibwe, Assiniboine, Plains Cree, Mandan, and Winnebago. This skill supported his later work as an interpreter in treaty councils, military campaigns, and trade expeditions. He was described as being "a man of noble proportions and physique, being over six feet in height and weighing two hundred and ten pounds."

== Marriages and descendants ==
Bottineau married Genevieve Larance at St. Boniface on December 1, 1836, and they had nine children. Genevieve died at St. Anthony Falls in April 1851. On January 6, 1852, he married Martha C. Gervais; they had fourteen children, with two dying in infancy.

In 1864 Bottineau and seventeen of his children received Half-Breed Scrip under amendments to the Old Crossing Treaty, in which he had served as translator and witness. At his death he left twenty-three surviving children from his two marriages.

== Work as guide and interpreter ==
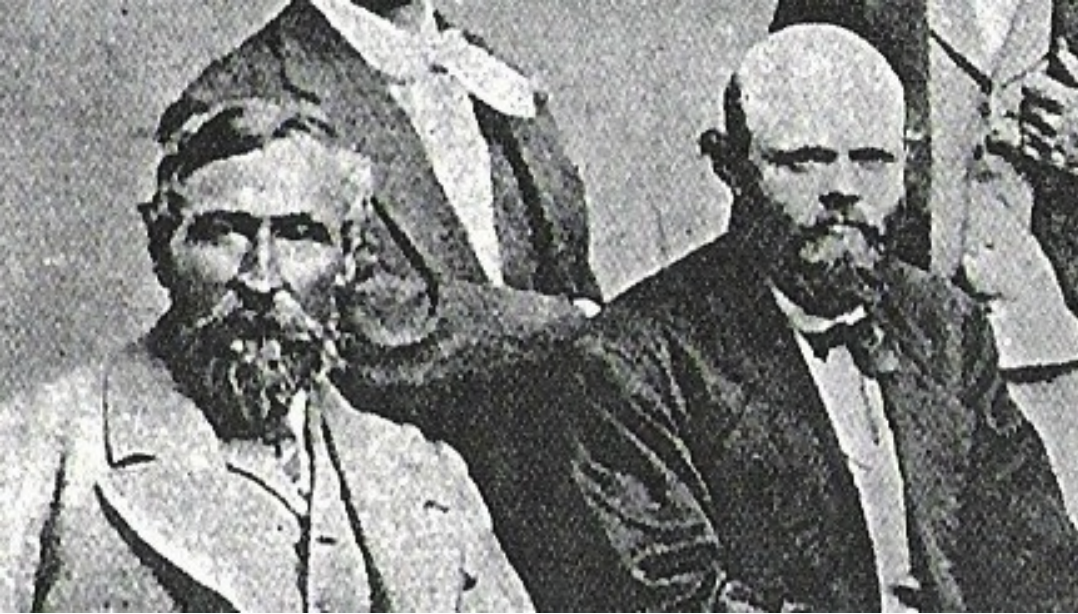
Pierre Bottineau (left) and William R. Marshall (right) in 1863 during a preliminary survey for the Northern Pacific Railroad

Bottineau began work as a messenger and voyageur in 1830, traveling from the Red River colony to Prairie du Chien for the North West Company. He later carried communications between Hudson's Bay Company posts in present-day Manitoba and American Fur Company stations across Minnesota. He took part in the 1830s efforts of James Dickson, who tried to organize an "Indian Liberating Army," and guided Martin McLeod through severe winter conditions from Fort Garry toward Fort Snelling.

From the 1830s through the 1860s he guided emigrant families, traders, and military parties across the upper Mississippi and Red River regions. Isaac Stevens, governor of Washington Territory, selected Bottineau as principal guide for the 1853 Pacific Railroad survey across northern Dakota to Fort Union and praised his knowledge of frontier travel and hunting.

== Land, settlement, and civic roles ==
Around 1840 Bottineau settled near Fort Snelling at a French-Métis village while also farming. After military orders cleared that settlement, he bought land in what became St. Paul and later acquired property along the east bank of the Mississippi above St. Anthony Falls, together with Franklin Steele holding much of that waterfront. He also owned a hotel and freighting way station on the Elk River during the early 1850s.

In 1855 Bottineau moved to what became Osseo, Minnesota, where his farm lay on "Bottineau's Prairie" and he held the elected office of Supervisor of Roads in Ramsey County in 1850. Over time he took part in founding or early development of settlements later known as Osseo, Maple Grove, Breckenridge, and Red Lake Falls in Minnesota and Wahpeton in North Dakota.

== Treaties and military service ==
Bottineau often worked as a scout and interpreter for Henry Hastings Sibley when Sibley represented the American Fur Company. In 1851 he received a contract to supply and guide Minnesota territorial governor Alexander Ramsey during treaty negotiations with the Pembina, Red Lake, and Turtle Mountain Ojibwe, though that first agreement did not gain ratification. He later served as guide and interpreter on treaty expeditions in 1860 and 1863 that led to the ratified Old Crossing Treaty with the Red Lake and Pembina bands.

During the U.S.–Dakota War era, Bottineau helped lead emigrant wagon trains, including the James Liberty Fisk party to Fort Union in 1862, and guided Sibley's troops in campaigns on the plains. His last major expedition came in 1869, when he again guided a Northern Pacific Railroad survey party to Fort Union.

== Later years ==
In 1876 Bottineau left the growing community near Osseo and resettled at Red Lake Falls, Minnesota, where he laid out the town and built a brick house near a bend in the river. In 1879 residents of Minnesota petitioned Congress to grant him a pension in recognition of his work as guide and interpreter. Bottineau died at Red Lake Falls on July 27, 1895.

== Legacy ==
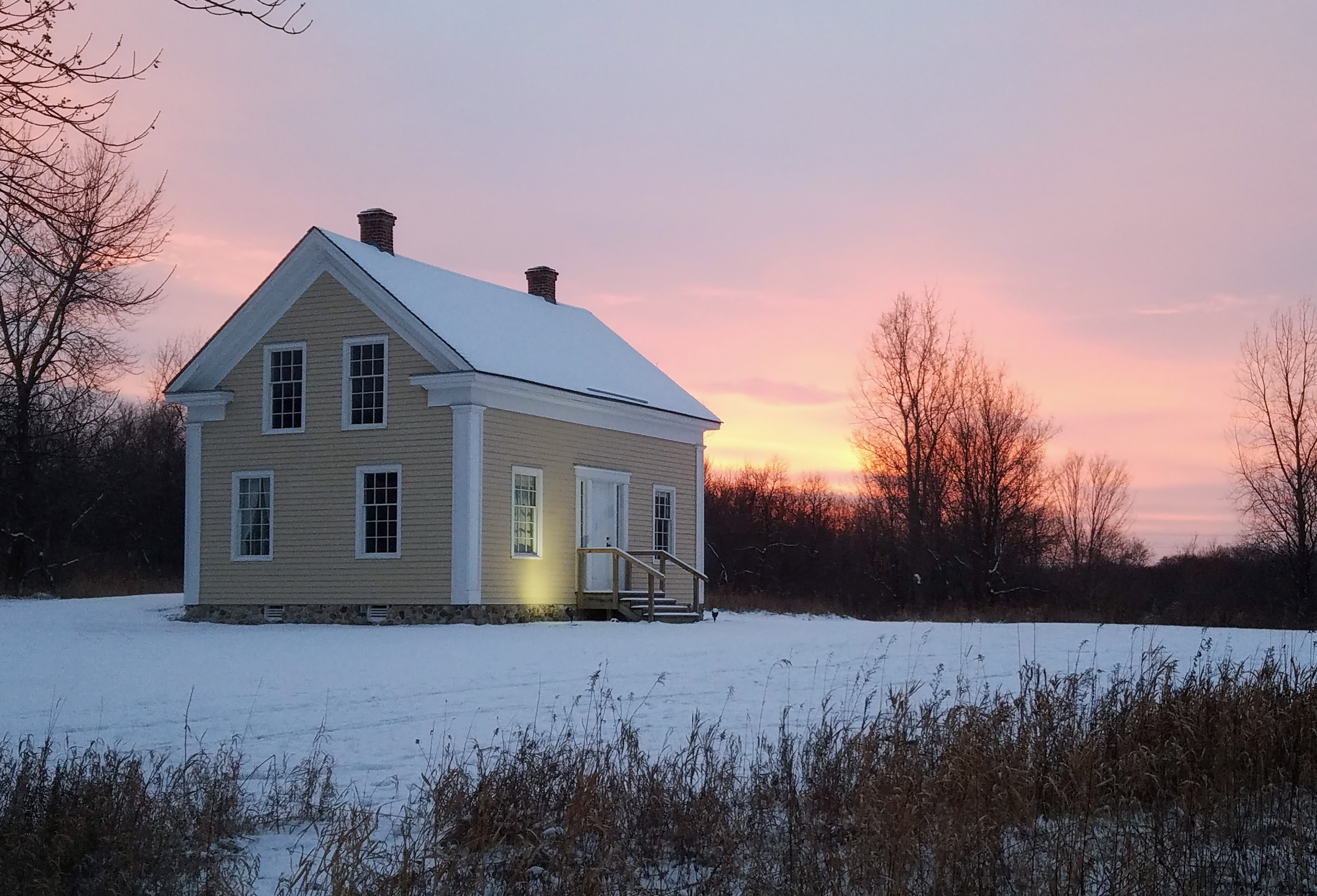
Bottineau's 1854 house, preserved in Maple Grove, Minnesota

Bottineau County in North Dakota and its county seat, Bottineau, carry his name in recognition of his role in the region. Writers have compared him to Daniel Boone and later accounts describe him as a symbol of Métis involvement in frontier settlement and treaty-making in the northern Plains.

Bottineau's name appears on the Pierre Bottineau Library, a branch of the Hennepin County Library system in northeast Minneapolis located on the historic Grain Belt campus and opened at that site in 2003. The library occupies a remodeled complex that joins former industrial buildings and serves nearby neighborhoods as part of the countywide system. The building reflects ongoing public recognition of Bottineau in the city where he once owned land along the Mississippi River.

The Pierre Bottineau House, first built around 1854 near Osseo as a wood-frame dwelling, now stands in Elm Creek Park Reserve, where it functions as an interpreted historic site about Bottineau and early settlers. The house has been moved and restored through projects by the Minnesota Department of Transportation, Three Rivers Park District, and preservation architects. Public programs there present Bottineau's roles in trade, guiding, and community formation in the Maple Grove and Osseo area.

Bottineau's name is also present in Bottineau Boulevard, the designation for County Road 81, which runs through several northwest Twin Cities suburbs and serves as a major transportation route. Plans for the METRO Blue Line Extension describe this corridor as a link between Minneapolis and suburbs such as Robbinsdale, Crystal, and Brooklyn Park, showing how his name continues in regional transit planning and daily travel.

== See also ==
- Marie Louise Bottineau Baldwin
- List of Métis people
