= List of newspapers in North Dakota =

This is a list of newspapers in North Dakota. There were approximately 105 newspapers in North Dakota in 2020 according to the Library of Congress. The oldest newspaper still in print under the same name is the Hillsboro Banner, which dates from 1879.

== Daily newspapers ==
- Bismarck Tribune - Bismarck
- Devils Lake Daily Journal - Devils Lake
- The Dickinson Press - Dickinson
- The Forum of Fargo-Moorhead - Fargo and Moorhead, Minnesota
- Grand Forks Herald - Grand Forks
- Jamestown Sun - Jamestown
- Minot Daily News - Minot
- Valley City Times-Record - Valley City
- Wahpeton Daily News - Wahpeton

== Weekly newspapers ==
- Adams County Record - Hettinger
- Aneta Star - Aneta
- Ashley Tribune - Ashley
- Benson County Farmers Press - Minnewaukan
- Beulah Beacon - Beulah
- Billings County Pioneer - Medora
- Bottineau Courant - Bottineau
- Bowman County Pioneer - Bowman
- Burke County Tribune - Bowbells
- Carson Press - Carson
- Cass County Reporter - Casselton
- Cavalier Chronicle - Cavalier
- Cavalier County Republican - Langdon
- The Center Republican - Center
- Crosby Journal - Crosby
- Dickey County Leader - Ellendale
- Dunn County Herald - Killdeer
- Edgeley Mail - Edgeley
- Edmore Herald - Edmore
- The Enderlin Independent - Enderlin
- Emmons County Record - Linton
- Glen Ullin Times - Glen Ullin
- Grant County News - Elgin
- Foster County Independent - Carrington
- Gleaner - Northwood
- Golden Valley News - Beach
- Griggs County Courier - Cooperstown
- Hatton Free Press - Hatton
- Hazen Star - Hazen
- Hebron Herald - Hebron
- The Herald-Press - Harvey
- The Herald - New England
- Hillsboro Banner - Hillsboro
- The Independent - Fingal
- The Kenmare News - Kenmare
- Kulm Messenger - Kulm
- Lake Metigoshe Mirror - Bottineau
- Lakota American - Lakota
- LaMoure Chronicle - LaMoure
- Larimore Leader-Tribune - Larimore
- The Leader-News - Washburn
- Litchville Bulletin - Litchville
- Mandan News - Mandan
- The McClusky Gazette - McClusky
- McKenzie County Farmer - Watford City
- McLean County Independent - Garrison
- McLean County Journal - Turtle Lake
- McVille Messenger - McVille
- Mountrail County Promoter - Stanley
- Mountrail County Record - Parshall
- Mouse River Journal - Towner
- Napoleon Homestead - Napoleon
- Nelson County Arena - Michigan
- New Rockford Transcript - New Rockford
- New Salem Journal - New Salem
- New Town News and Sanish Sentinel - New Town
- Oakes Times - Oakes
- Pembina New Era - Pembina
- The Pierce County Tribune - Rugby
- Ransom County Gazette - Lisbon
- Renville County Farmer - Mohall
- Richland County News-Monitor - Hankinson
- The Sargent County Teller - Milnor
- The Standard - Westhope
- Steele County Press - Finley
- Steele Ozone and Kidder County Press - Steele
- Tioga Tribune - Tioga
- Towner County Record-Herald - Cando
- Traill County Tribune - Mayville
- Tri-County News - Gackle
- Tri-County Sun - Fordville
- Turtle Mountain Star - Rolla
- Turtle Mountain Times - Belcourt
- The Underwood News - Underwood
- Valley News and Views - Drayton
- Velva Area Voice - Velva
- Walhalla Mountaineer - Walhalla
- Walsh County Press - Park River
- The Walsh County Record - Grafton
- West Fargo Pioneer - West Fargo
- Williston Herald - Williston
- Wishek Star - Wishek

== College newspapers ==
- The Collegian - Jamestown College
- Dakota Student - University of North Dakota
- The Hawk - Dickinson State University
- The Mystician - Bismarck State College
- Red and Green - Minot State University
- The Spectrum - North Dakota State University
- The Summit - University of Mary
- The Orbit - Mayville State University

== Alternative news ==
- High Plains Reader - Fargo
- Great Plains Examiner - Bismarck

== Defunct ==
- Bismarck Daily Tribune (1881-1916)
- Der Staats Anzeiger (1906–1945)
- Great Plains Examiner (2011-2013, Bismarck)
- Jamestown Weekly Alert (Jamestown) (1882–1925)
- Neche Chronotype (1897–1928)
- Northern Express (Drayton) (1881–1883)
- Pembina County Chronotype-Express (Neche) (1929–1932)
- Pembina Pioneer (1879–1882)
- Pioneer Express (Pembina) (1883–1928)
- Sioux County Arrow (Fort Yates) (1928–1929)
- Sioux County Pioneer (Fort Yates) (1914–1929)
- Sioux County Pioneer-Arrow (Fort Yates) (1929–1967)
- Ward County Independent (Minot) (1902–1965)
- Washburn Leader (1890–1986)
- Wilton News (1899–1986)
- Wing Press (Wing, N.D.) (1951)

== See also ==
Comprehensive

- Lists of newspapers
- List of newspapers in the United States

Frequency

- List of free daily newspapers in the United States
- List of weekly newspapers in the United States

Circulation

- List of international newspapers originating in the United States
- List of national newspapers in the United States
- List of newspapers in the United States by circulation

Foreign language

- List of French-language newspapers published in the United States
- List of German-language newspapers published in the United States
- List of Spanish-language newspapers published in the United States

Specialty

- List of African-American newspapers in the United States
- List of alternative weekly newspapers in the United States
- List of business newspapers in the United States
- List of family-owned newspapers in the United States
- List of Jewish newspapers in the United States
- List of LGBTQ periodicals in the United States
- List of student newspapers in the United States
- List of supermarket tabloids in the United States
- List of underground press in the United States

Other

- List of defunct newspapers of the United States
