= Buechner & Orth =

American architectural firm

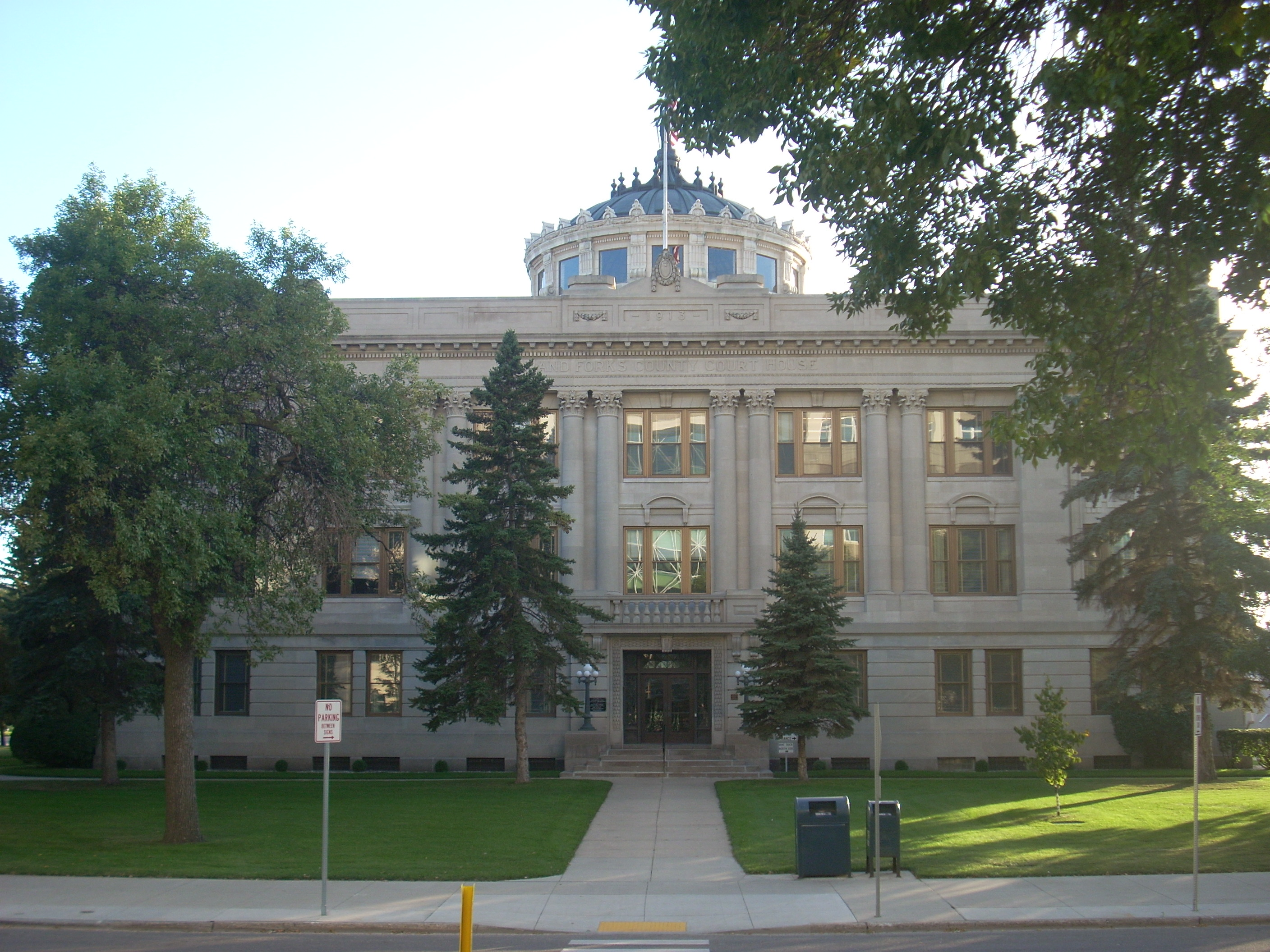
Grand Forks County Courthouse

Buechner & Orth was a St. Paul, Minnesota-based architectural firm that designed buildings in Minnesota and surrounding states, including 13 courthouses in North Dakota. It was the subject of a 1979 historic resources study.

Charles W. Buechner, the founding partner, was born in Germany in 1859. He emigrated to the United States in 1874 and worked for a time at the Northern Pacific Railway as a surveyor and civil engineer, eventually becoming the Superintendent of Tracks, Buildings and Bridges. He left the Northern Pacific and studied architecture under noted Minnesota architect Clarence H. Johnston Sr. In 1892, he founded the firm Buechner & Jacobson with partner John H. Jacobson. They designed at least three Minnesota courthouses in the popular Richardsonian Romanesque style.

In 1902, John Jacobson died, so Buechner formed a new partnership with Henry W. Orth, a recent Norwegian immigrant. They designed the Pierce County Courthouse in the Neoclassical Revival style popularized by the World's Columbian Exposition of 1893. In the next 25 years, they designed at least 19 other courthouses in this style.

== Works ==
=== Minnesota ===
- Douglas County Courthouse (Minnesota)
- Jackson County Courthouse (Minnesota)
- Kanabec County Courthouse, by predecessor firm Buechner & Jacobson
- Lac qui Parle County Courthouse, Buechner & Jacobson
- Madison City Hall
- Otter Tail County Courthouse
- Ramsey County Poor Farm Barn
- Swift County Courthouse, Buechner & Jacobson
- Wilkin County Courthouse

=== Montana ===
- First National Bank of Glasgow

=== North Dakota ===
- Grand Forks County Courthouse, NRHP-listed
- Dickey County Courthouse
- Divide County Courthouse
- Fargo Theatre
- Foster County Courthouse
- LaMoure County Courthouse
- McHenry County Courthouse
- McIntosh County Courthouse (North Dakota)
- Mountrail County Courthouse
- Pembina County Courthouse
- Pierce County Courthouse (North Dakota)
- Richland County Courthouse (North Dakota)
- Sargent County Courthouse
- Traill County Courthouse
- St. Alexius Hospital, Bismarck, 1914 Building
- St. Alexius Hospital, Bismarck, Nurses Home
- VCSU Vangstad Auditorium?, Valley City, 1907 Building (Not Certain, But Likely Due To Detailing Very Similar To Known Work)

=== South Dakota ===
- Deuel County Courthouse and Jail
- McPherson County Courthouse (South Dakota)
- Roberts County Courthouse (South Dakota)
- Sioux Falls State Theatre

=== Wisconsin ===
- Pierce County Courthouse (Wisconsin)
- West Bay Club (Sand Island)
