= Sargent County Courthouse =

- U.S. National Register of Historic Places
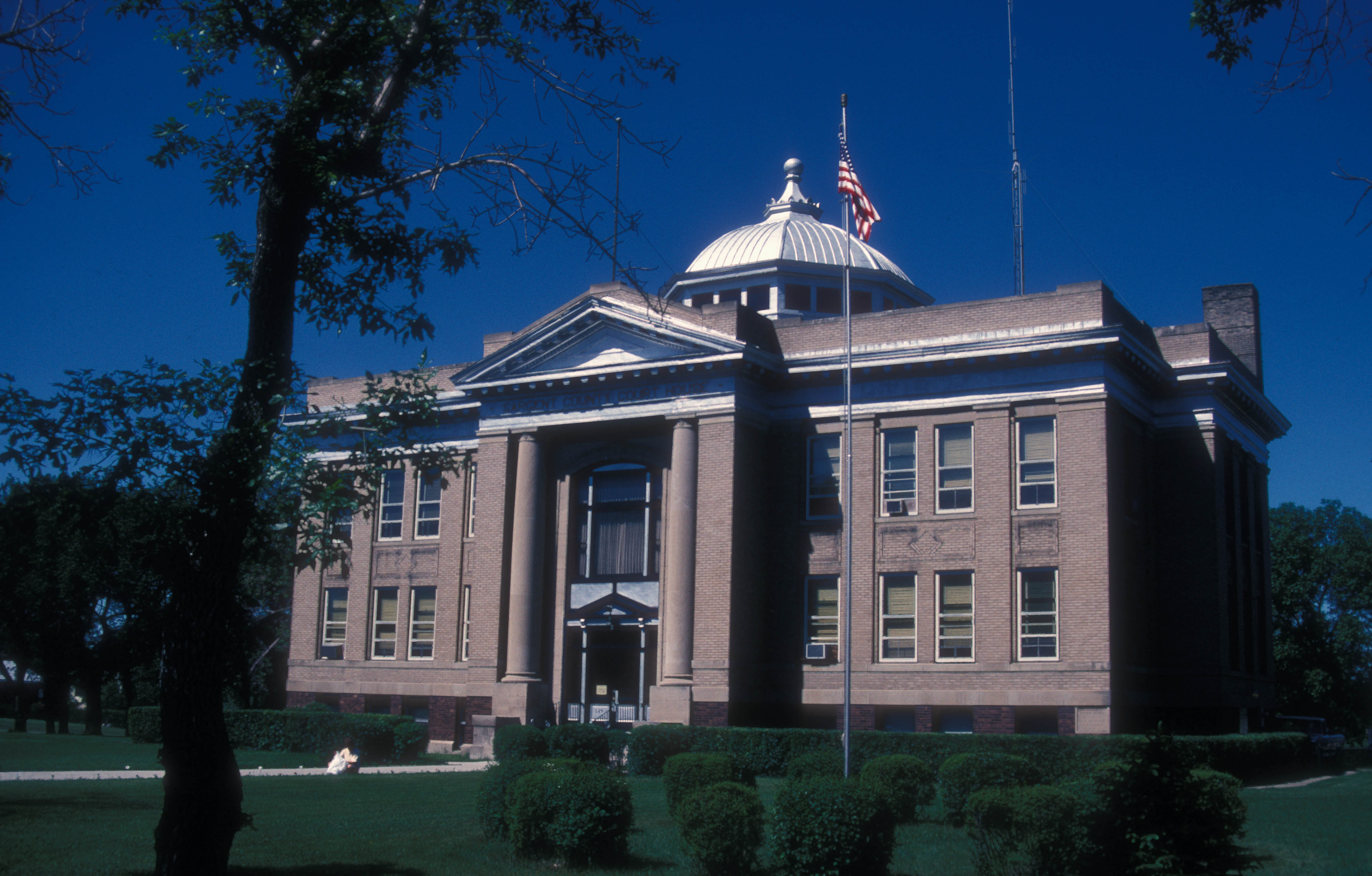

- Location within North Dakota Location within the United States
- Interactive map showing the location of Sargent County Courthouse
- Location: 355 Main St S, Forman, North Dakota
- Coordinates: 46°6′23″N 97°38′13″W
- Built: 1910
- Architect: Buechner & Orth
- Architectural style: Beaux Arts
- MPS: Buechner and Orth Courthouses in North Dakota TR
- NRHP reference No.: 80002927
- Added to NRHP: November 25, 1980

The Sargent County Courthouse in Forman, North Dakota was built in 1910. The courthouse of Sargent County, it was designed by architects Buechner & Orth in Beaux Arts style. It was listed on the National Register of Historic Places in 1980.

It has been described as an "economy version" of the Foster County Courthouse and Pierce County Courthouses (other North Dakota courthouses designed by Buechner & Orth). Its front facade has a center pavilion that is "virtually identical" to that of the Foster County Courthouse, with small variations.

The interior of the building includes a skylight of geometric stained glass, and pink terrazzo and pink marble floors on the first floor. The interior may have had murals that have been lost, but has not been changed in terms of its spaces, besides addition of a dropped ceiling of acoustical tile in the courtroom. In particular its rotunda interior is simpler than those of other Buechner & Orth courthouses in North Dakota.
