= Pierce County Courthouse =

Pierce County Courthouse may refer to:

- Pierce County Courthouse (Georgia)
- Pierce County Courthouse (North Dakota)
- Pierce County Courthouse (Wisconsin)
- Pierce County Courthouse (Washington), a county courthouse in Washington
