= McHenry County Courthouse =

- U.S. National Register of Historic Places
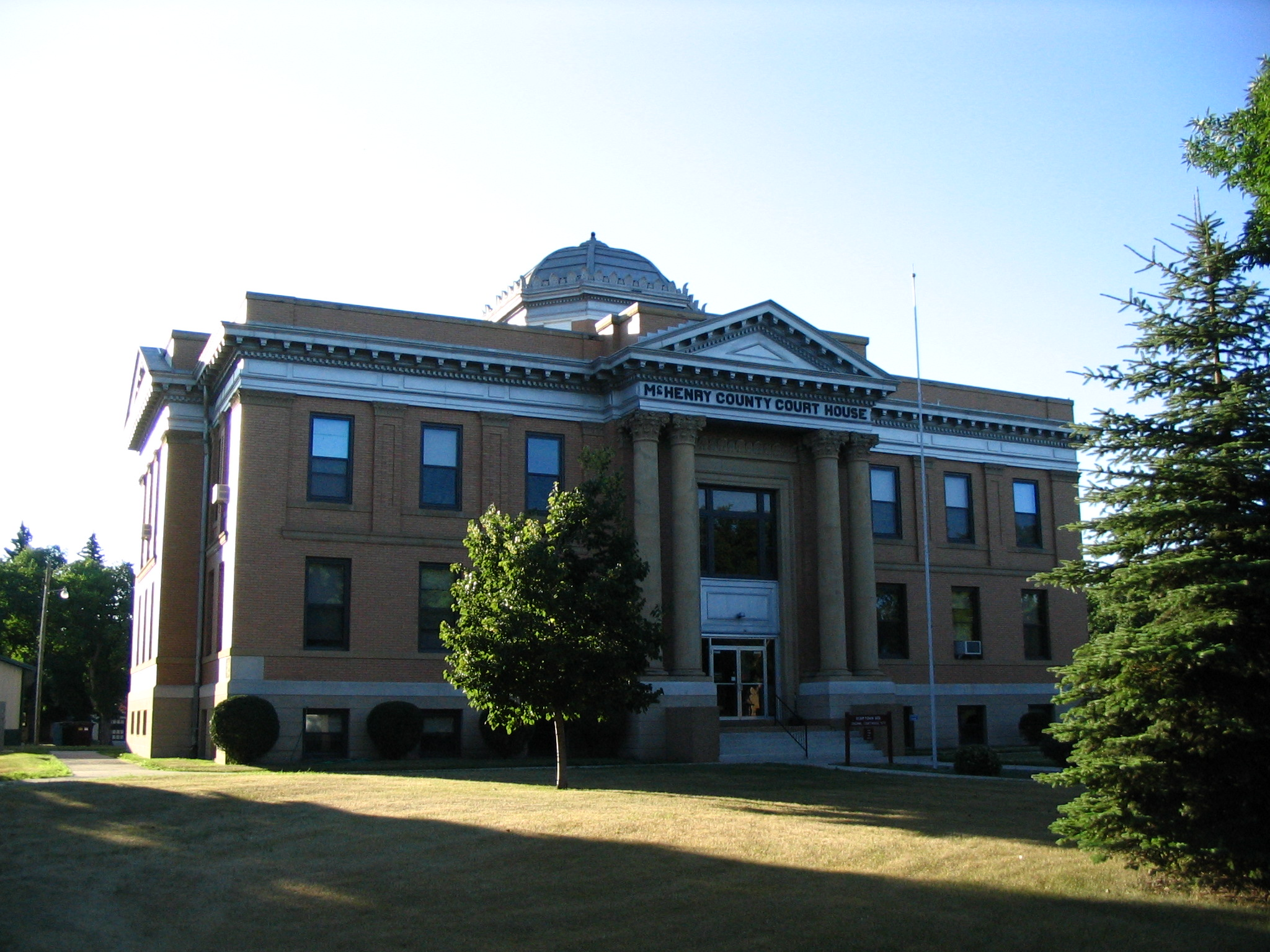

- Location within North Dakota Location within the United States
- Interactive map showing the location of McHenry County Courthouse
- Location: in Towner, North Dakota
- Coordinates: 48°20′35″N 100°24′13″W
- Built: 1907
- Architect: Buechner & Orth
- Architectural style: Beaux Arts
- MPS: Buechner and Orth Courthouses in North Dakota TR
- NRHP reference No.: 80002917
- Added to NRHP: November 25, 1980

The McHenry County Courthouse in Towner, North Dakota was built in 1907. Along with a number of other North Dakota courthouses designed by its architects Buechner & Orth, it was listed on the National Register of Historic Places in 1980.

It includes Beaux Arts architecture and is said to be "an economy version" of the architects' Traill County Courthouse design. Its surface is buff brown brick, and it has a limestone line about the first floor level.
