= Henry Orth =

American architect

Harold (Henry) William Orth (April 14, 1866 - March 5, 1946) was an American architect.

== Background ==
Harold William Orth was born on a ship en route to the United States from Christiana (Oslo), Norway, on April 14, 1866. His exact date of arrival to the United States is unknown. He was educated at a business college (location unknown). He married Esther Susan Trigalet and settled in St. Paul, Minnesota.

== Career ==
Residence in Linden Hills Minneapolis, Minnesota designed by Buechner & Orth

He became a partner of Frank W. Kinney (1855–1929) in Austin, Minnesota, in 1895. The partnership of Kinney and Orth designed several large buildings in various parts of Minnesota until 1900. The work of architects Kinney & Orth included the Winnebago County Courthouse, a Romanesque-style building made of red brick and trimmed with stone, built during 1896 in Forest City, Iowa.

In 1902, Orth joined Charles Buechner (1859–1924) in St. Paul. Buechner remained a partner with Orth in the architectural firm Buechner & Orth until his death in 1924. The firm specialized in designing courthouses and theaters throughout the Midwest and was one of the most successful architectural practices of its day in the area. Buechner & Orth was known for its use of Beaux-Arts architecture.

== Buildings ==
Among the many buildings designed by Buechner & Orth are:

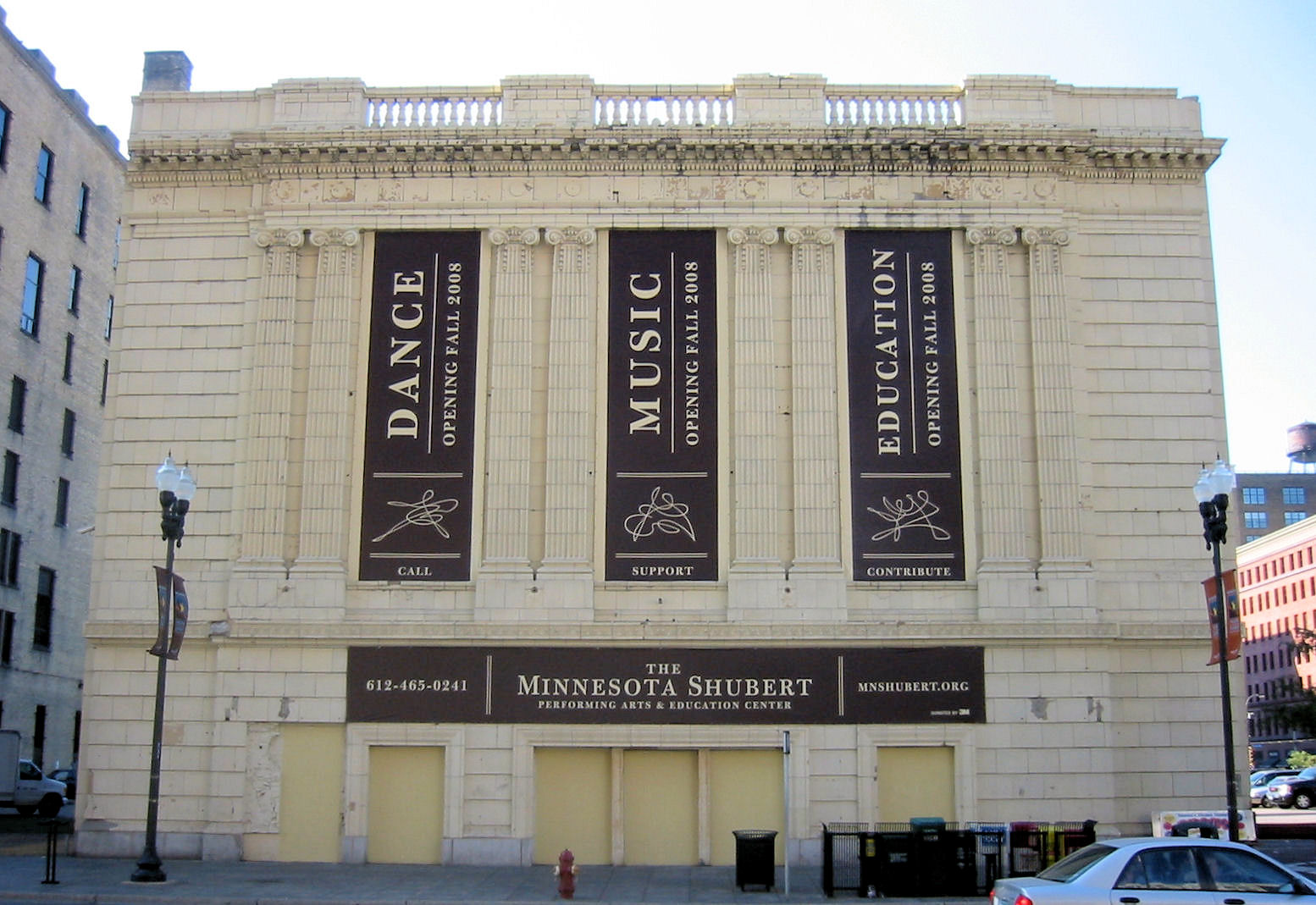
Shubert Theater (1910) St. Paul, Minnesota designed by Buechner & Orth

- Cleveland High School (St. Paul), 1909
- Empress Theatre (St. Paul), 1910
- Grand Theatre (Grand Forks, ND), 1919
- Labor Temple (St. Paul), 1922
- Lagoon Theatre (Minneapolis), 1915
- Luther Seminary (St. Paul), several buildings for, 1921, 1923
- Masonic Temple (St. Paul)
- Shubert Theatre (St. Paul), 1909 & 1910
- Henry Orth residence (St. Paul), 1915
- Palace Theatre (St. Paul), 1916
- St. Alexius Hospital (Bismarck, ND), 1914
- Shriners Hospital for Crippled Children (Minneapolis), 1922
- State Theatre (Sioux Falls, SD), 1925
- West Bay Club (Sand Island, WI), 1913
- Fargo Theatre (Fargo, North Dakota), 1925
- Drawings for 19 courthouses in Minnesota, and North and South Dakota, 1907–1926, and plans of nearly 100 residences, most of them in Minneapolis and St. Paul.
