= McIntosh County Courthouse =

McIntosh County Courthouse may refer to:

- McIntosh County Courthouse (North Dakota), Ashley, North Dakota, listed on the National Register of Historic Places
- McIntosh County Courthouse (Oklahoma), listed on the NRHP in McIntosh County, Oklahoma
