= Dickey County Courthouse =

- U.S. National Register of Historic Places
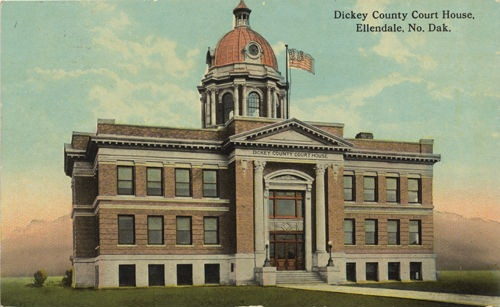
- Dickey County Courthouse, c. 1916

- Location within North Dakota Location within the United States
- Interactive map showing the location of Dickey County Courthouse
- Location: Off U.S. 281, Ellendale, North Dakota
- Coordinates: 46°0′15″N 98°31′24″W
- Area: less than one acre
- Built: 1910
- Architect: Buechner & Orth
- Architectural style: Beaux Arts
- MPS: Buechner and Orth Courthouses in North Dakota TR
- NRHP reference No.: 80004283
- Added to NRHP: November 25, 1980

The Dickey County Courthouse in Ellendale, North Dakota was built in 1910. It is in Beaux Arts architecture and was designed by architects Buechner & Orth. It was listed on the National Register of Historic Places (1980) in 1980.

Among Buechner & Orth's designs for courthouses, this one's design is apparently nearly identical in that of the Traill County Courthouse, with the exceptions being paired columns on its tower and differing pilasters among the second floor windows. According to its NRHP nomination, its rotunda is "less exuberant in ornament" than those of most other courthouses designed by Buechner & Orth.
