= Deuel County Courthouse and Jail =

- U.S. National Register of Historic Places
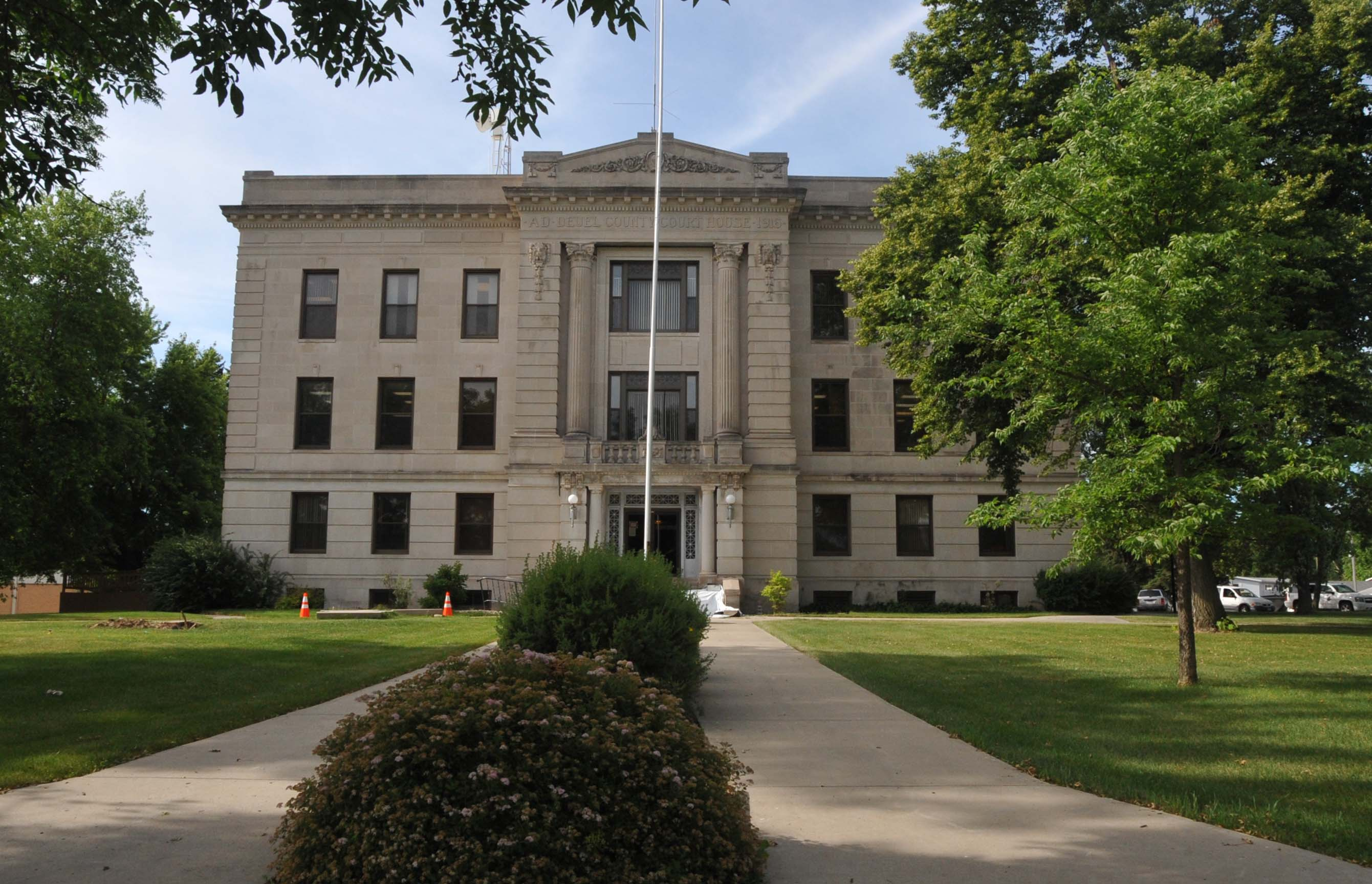

- Location within South Dakota Location within the United States
- Interactive map showing the location of Deuel County Courthouse & Jail
- Location: SD 22, Clear Lake, South Dakota
- Coordinates: 44.755264°N 96.68478944°W
- Area: 1 acre (0.40 ha)
- Built: 1916
- Architect: Buechner & Orth
- NRHP reference No.: 76001730
- Added to NRHP: June 16, 1976

Deuel County Courthouse and Jail in Clear Lake, South Dakota was listed on the National Register of Historic Places in 1976. It is located on South Dakota Highway 22.

It is a three-story three-bay building built of Bedford limestone and cost $75,000 when built in 1916. It was designed by architects Buechner & Orth.

The jail building, a two-story brick building, was built in 1899, and also served as the sheriff's residence.
