= Hillsboro Municipal Airport (North Dakota) =

Airport in North Dakota, United States

- IATA: none; ICAO: none; FAA LID: 3H4

Summary
- Airport type: Public
- Owner: Hillsboro Municipal Airport Authority
- Serves: Hillsboro, North Dakota
- Elevation AMSL: 906 ft (276 m)
- Coordinates: 47°21′34″N 097°03′37″W

Map
- Location within North Dakota Location within the United States

Runways
Direction	Length		Surface
Direction	ft	m	Surface
16/34	3,301	1,006	Asphalt

Statistics (2010)
- Aircraft operations: 14,670
- Based aircraft: 22
- Source: Federal Aviation Administration

Hillsboro Municipal Airport (FAA LID: 3H4) is three miles south of Hillsboro, in Traill County, North Dakota,. It is owned by the Hillsboro Municipal Airport Authority. The FAA's National Plan of Integrated Airport Systems for 2011–2015 categorized it as a general aviation facility.

== Facilities ==
The airport covers 55 acres (22 ha) at an elevation of 906 feet (276 m). Its single runway, 16/34, is 3,301 by 60 feet (1,006 x 18 m).

In the year ending September 30, 2010 the airport had 14,670 aircraft operations, average 40 per day: 98% general aviation, 2% air taxi, and <1% military. 22 single-engine aircraft were then based at this airport.

== Accolades ==
In 2022, the North Dakota Aeronautics Commission and the Airport Association of North Dakota named Hillsboro Municipal Airport the General Aviation Airport of the Year, the fourth time it has received that award.

== See also ==
- List of airports in North Dakota
