= Divide County Courthouse =

- U.S. National Register of Historic Places
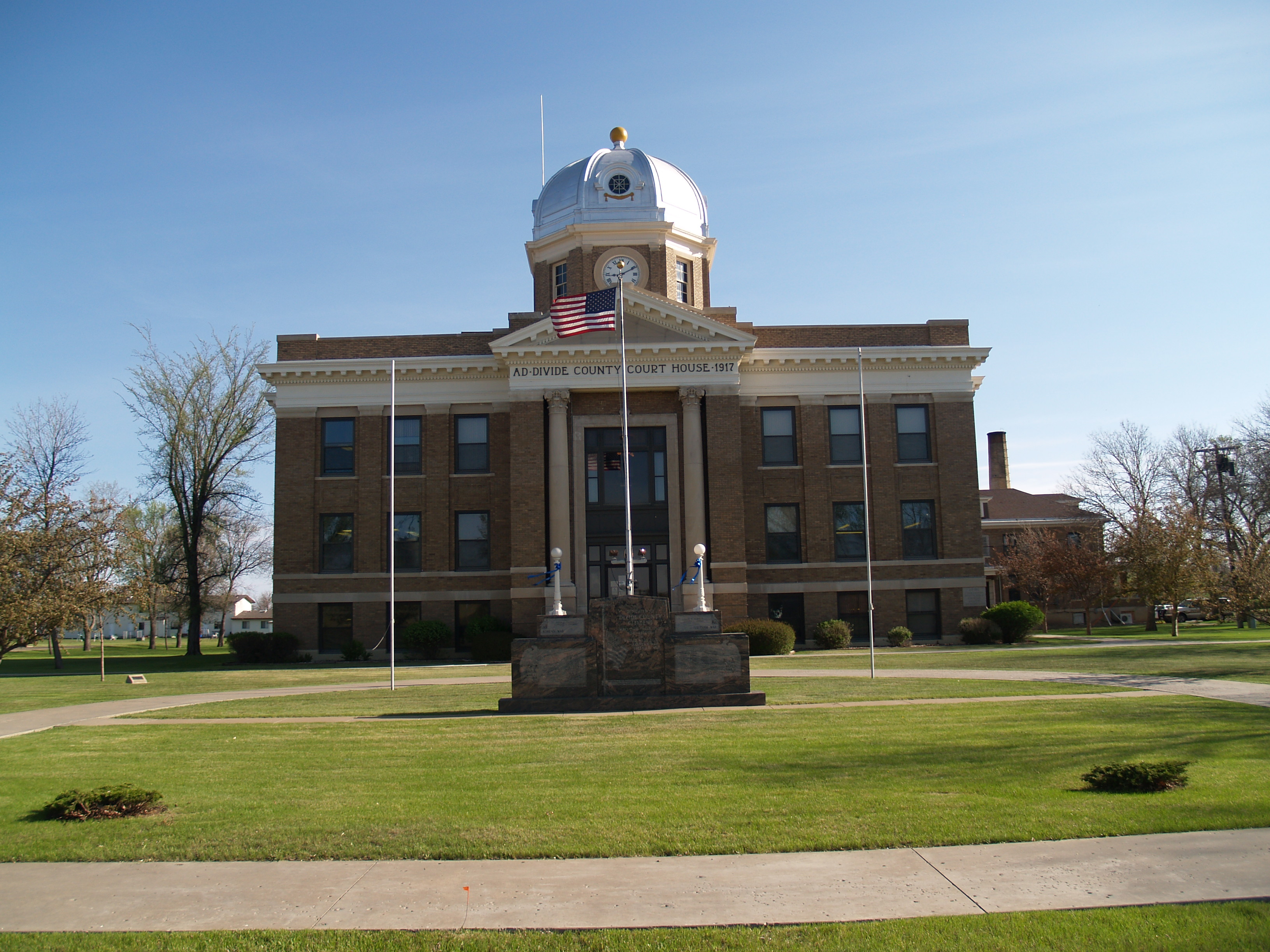

- Location within North Dakota Location within the United States
- Interactive map showing the location of Divide County Courthouse
- Location: Crosby, North Dakota
- Coordinates: 48°54′55″N 103°17′38″W
- Built: 1917
- Architect: Buechner & Orth
- Architectural style: Beaux Arts
- MPS: Buechner and Orth Courthouses in North Dakota TR
- NRHP reference No.: 80002910
- Added to NRHP: November 25, 1980

The Divide County Courthouse in Crosby, North Dakota was built in 1917. It was designed by architects Buechner & Orth in Beaux Arts style. It was listed on the National Register of Historic Places in 1980.

According to its NRHP nomination, its "interior features terrazzo floors and dark wood trim in an austere version of the usual Buechner and Orth treatment."
