= Ramsey County Poor Farm Barn =

- U.S. National Register of Historic Places
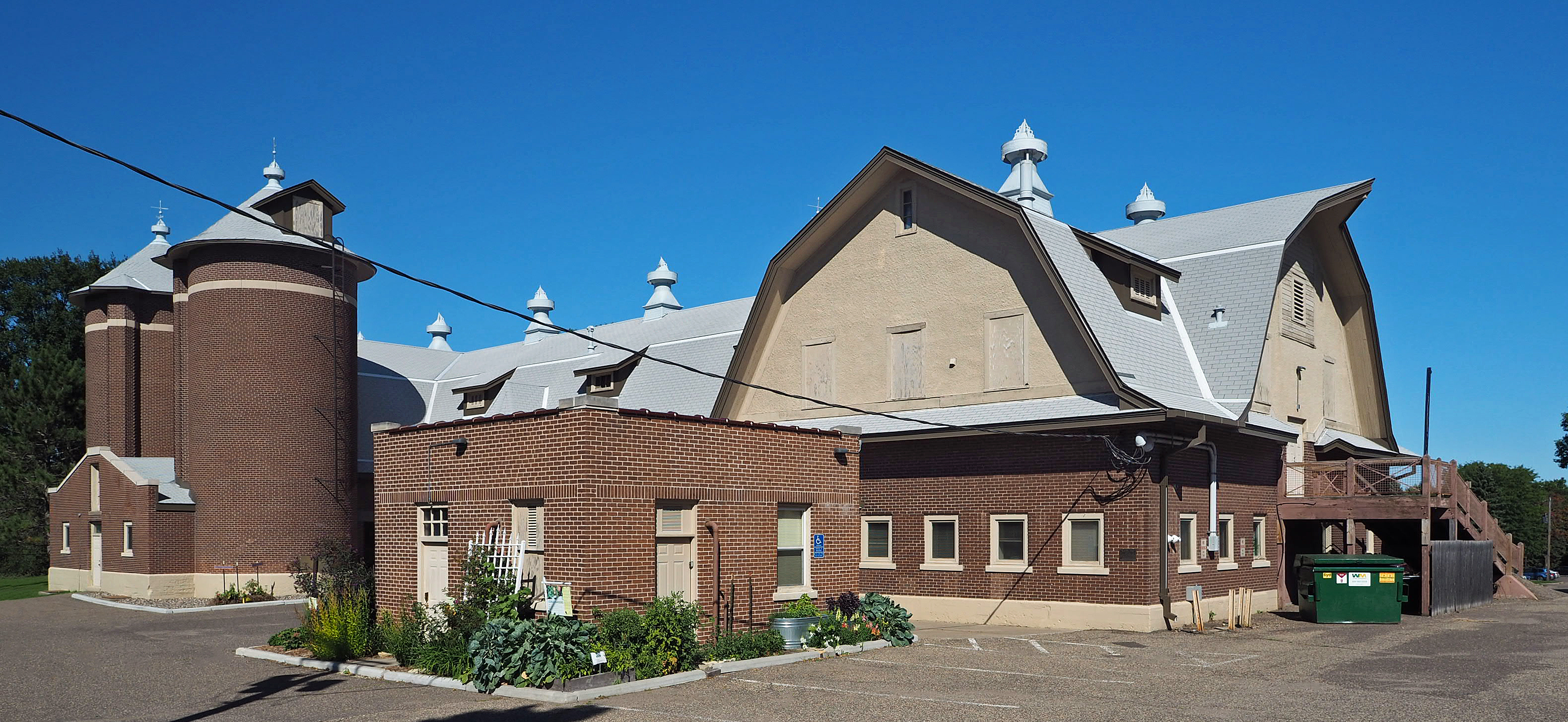
- Ramsey County Poor Farm Barn from the southwest

- Location within Minnesota Location within the United States
- Location: 2020 White Bear Avenue, Maplewood, Minnesota
- Coordinates: 45°0′1″N 93°1′27″W
- Built: 1918
- Architect: Buechner & Orth
- NRHP reference No.: 77000766
- Added to NRHP: September 22, 1977

The Ramsey County Poor Farm Barn served as home and work for the indigent in Ramsey County, Minnesota, United States. The barn is now used by the Ramsey County Cooperative extension service. It is listed on the National Register of Historic Places.

The second floor housed the Ramsey County Fright Farm, a popular haunted attraction, from 1996 through 2020.
