= LaMoure County Courthouse =

- U.S. National Register of Historic Places
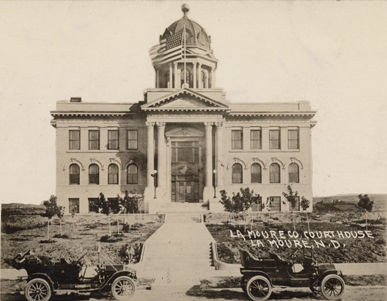
- LaMoure County Courthouse, c. 1916

- Location within North Dakota Location within the United States
- Location: LaMoure, North Dakota
- Coordinates: 46°21′45″N 98°17′28″W
- Built: 1907
- Architect: Buechner & Orth
- Architectural style: Beaux Arts
- MPS: Buechner and Orth Courthouses in North Dakota TR
- NRHP reference No.: 80004284
- Added to NRHP: November 25, 1980

The LaMoure County Courthouse in LaMoure, North Dakota was built in 1907. It was designed by architects Buechner & Orth in Beaux Arts style. It was listed on the National Register of Historic Places (NRHP) in 1980.

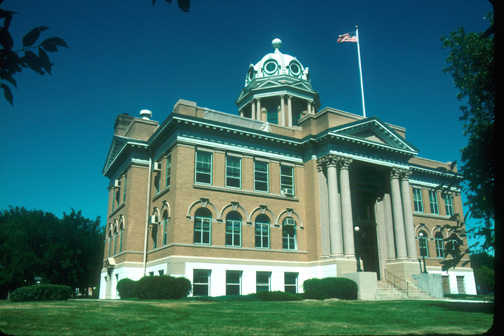
LaMoure County Courthouse in 1996.

The structure includes a highly detailed, metal-covered dome with bull's eye windows topped by a ball finial. An octagonal tower with columns and arched windows supports the dome. The front facade features four large Corinithian columns.
