= Mountrail County Courthouse =

- U.S. National Register of Historic Places
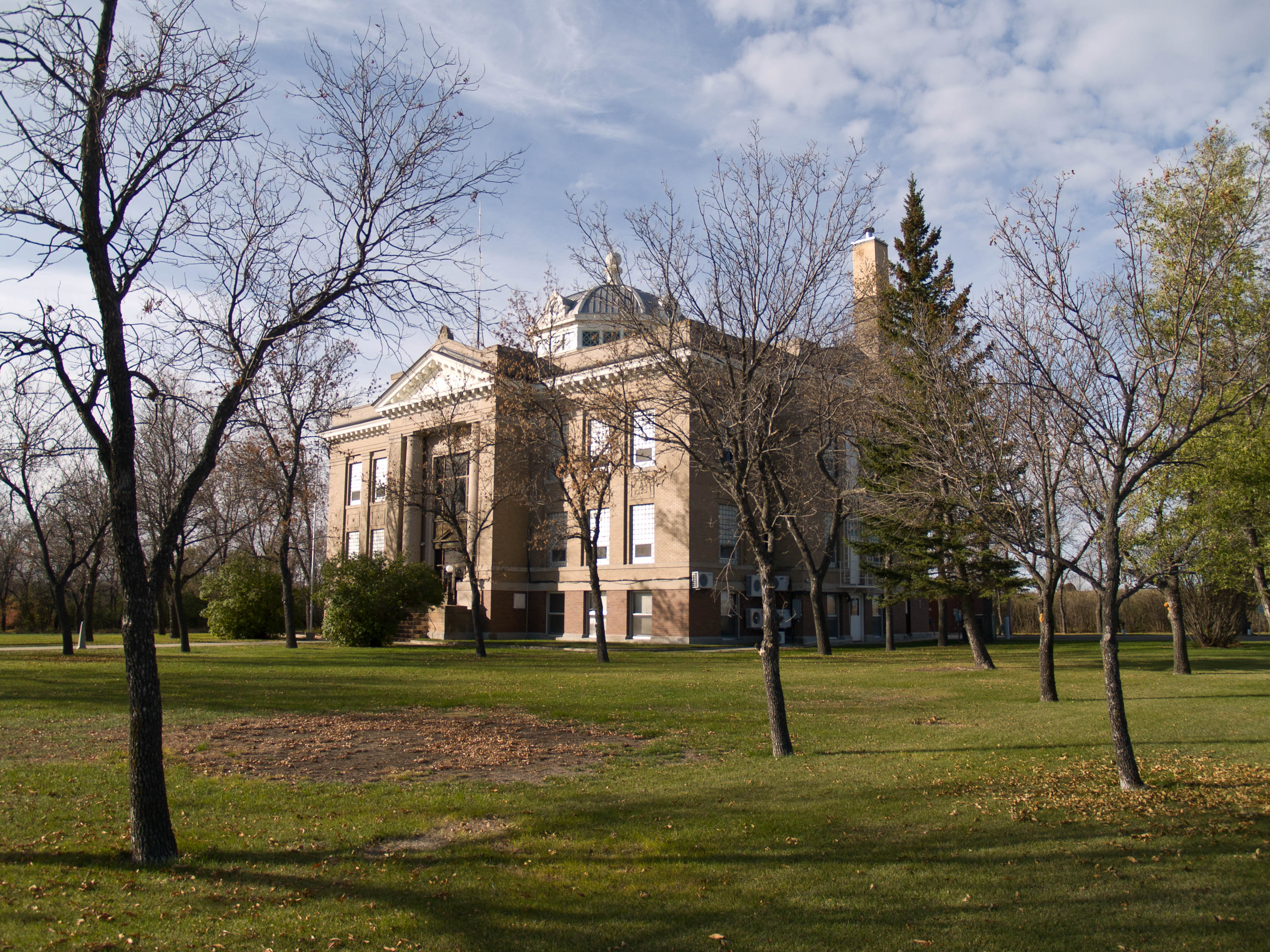
- Courthouse in 2008

- Location within North Dakota Location within the United States
- Location: 101 N. Main St., Stanley, North Dakota
- Coordinates: 48°19′16″N 102°23′27″W
- Area: 2.1 acres (0.85 ha)
- Built: 1914
- Built by: Carl Bartleson
- Architect: Buechner & Orth
- Architectural style: Late 19th and 20th Century Revivals, Academic Revival style
- MPS: Buechner and Orth Courthouses in North Dakota TR
- NRHP reference No.: 78001992
- Added to NRHP: December 22, 1978

The Mountrail County Courthouse in Stanley, North Dakota was built in 1914 and served Mountrail County as its courthouse continuously since then. It was designed by architects Buechner & Orth in what can be termed Academic Revival architecture and/or Late 19th and 20th Century Revivals architecture. It was listed on the National Register of Historic Places in 1978; a 2.1-acre (0.85 ha) area was included in the listing.
