= First National Bank of Glasgow =

- U.S. National Register of Historic Places
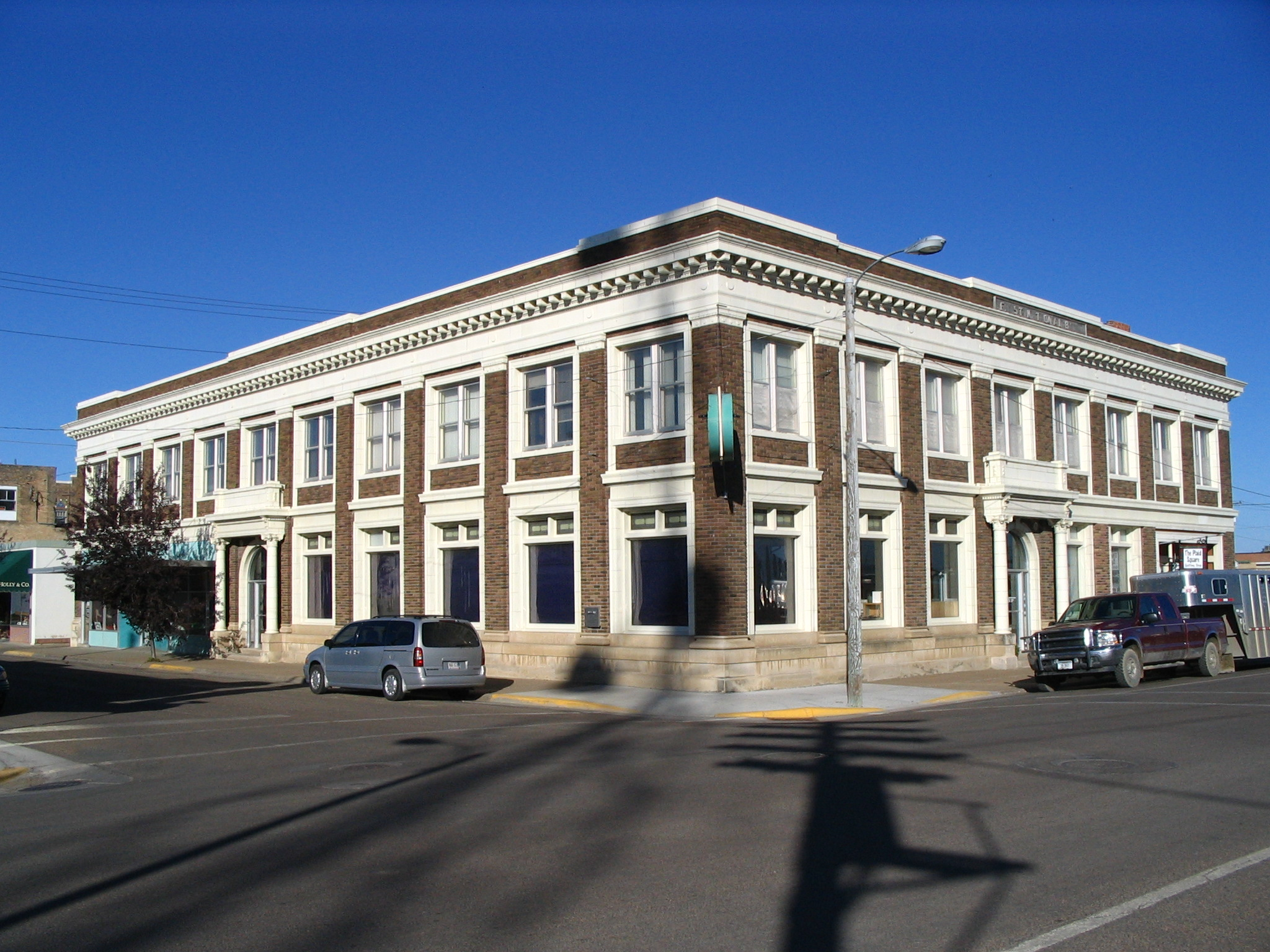

- Location within Montana Location within the United States
- Location: 110 Fifth St. S, Glasgow, Montana
- Coordinates: 48°11′40″N 106°38′7″W
- Area: less than one acre
- Built: 1914
- Architect: Buechner & Orth
- Architectural style: Beaux Arts
- NRHP reference No.: 02000698
- Added to NRHP: June 27, 2002

The First National Bank of Glasgow in Glasgow, Montana was built in 1914. It was listed on the National Register of Historic Places in 2002.

It is a two-story L-shaped building which was designed by Buechner & Orth in Beaux Arts style. It has also been known as Langen Building and as Irving Building.
