= Sioux Falls State Theatre =

Historic movie theater in South Dakota, United States

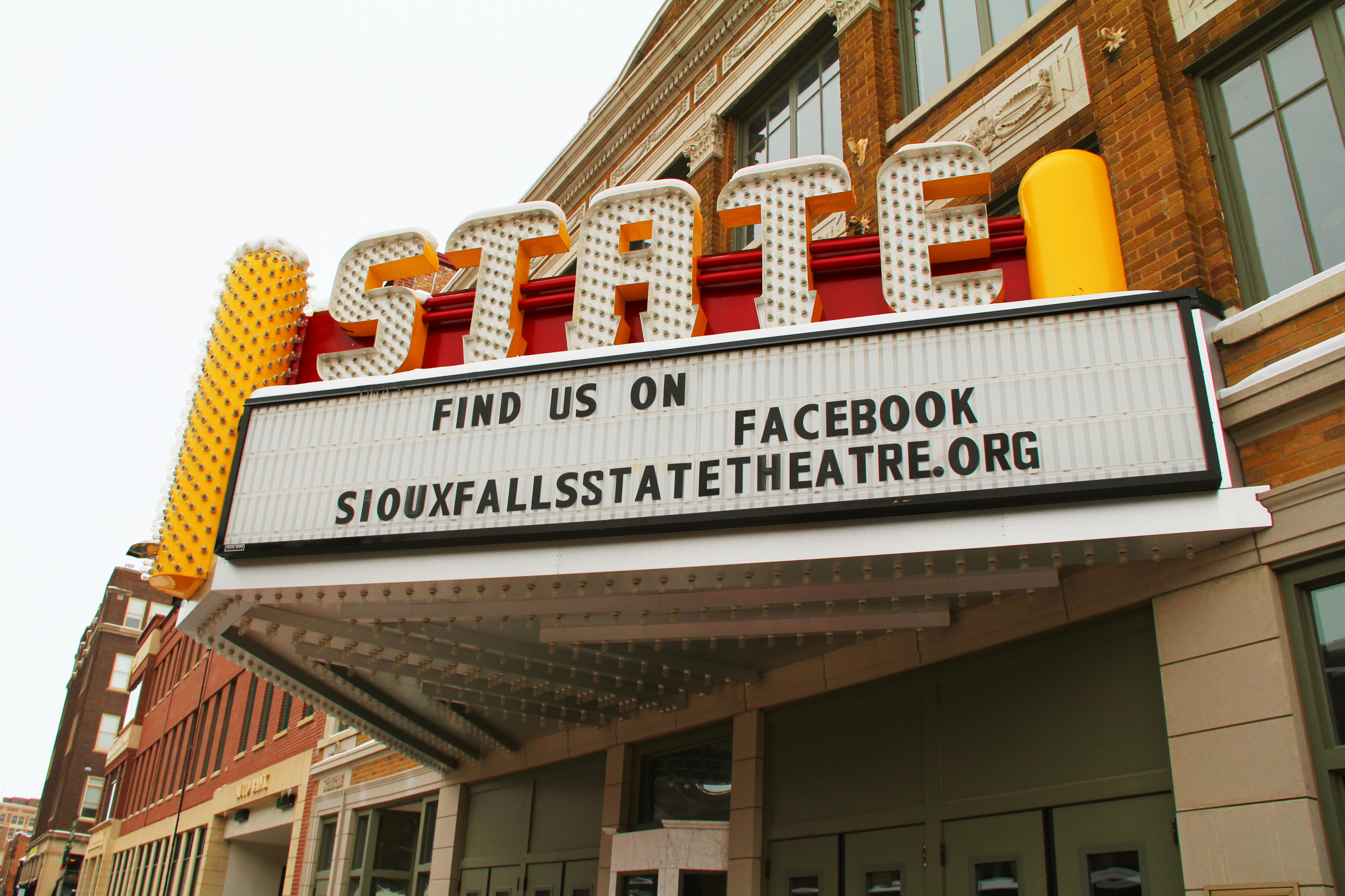
- The theater's marquee
- Interactive map of Sioux Falls State Theatre
- Address: 316 S. Phillips Avenue; Sioux Falls, South Dakota; United States
- Coordinates: 43°32′39″N 96°43′35″W

Construction
- Opened: March 2, 1926; 100 years ago
- Years active: 1926–1990, 2020–present
- Architect: Buechner & Orth

Website
- siouxfallsstatetheatre.org

The State Theatre is a historic one-screen movie theater in Sioux Falls, South Dakota. Opened in 1926, it operated continuously until 1990 when it was closed amidst the popularity of multiplexes. In 2005, a city-supported group was formed to finance the renovation and re-opening of the venue. In December 2020, the State Theatre resumed screening movies. The historic building was designed by Buechner & Orth, an architecture firm from Saint Paul, Minnesota.

== History ==
M. L. Finkelstein and I. H. Ruben, a duo of cinema proprietors operating in the Upper Midwest, commissioned the State Theatre in 1925. Saint Paul-based architecture firm Buechner & Orth designed the venue in the Beaux-Arts style. Finkelstein and Ruben selected the Henry Carlson Company as the general contractor for the project, and construction began that year. On March 2, 1926, the State Theatre opened to the public with a screening of the A. Edward Sutherland silent film Behind the Front. In 1928, two years after its opening, the venue switched from silent films to sound film programming.

On February 13, 1940, the Argus Leader announced in its daily edition that the State Theatre would be screening the historical romance epic Gone with the Wind. The arrival of the acclaimed movie made the theater a major attraction, as long lines for tickets formed around the block.

On February 16, 1956, the State Theatre hosted the premiere of the Richard Brooks film The Last Hunt, a Western set in South Dakota. It was the first premiere in the venue's history and was also believed to be the first major premiere in the city's history. Co-stars Stewart Granger and Russ Tamblyn attended the event. The screening attracted thousands of fans and a capacity crowd. Local Native American dancers performed and gave a blessing to Tamblyn and Venetia Stevenson, who had been married two days prior.

Due to the decline of the venue and attendance lost to newer multiplex theaters, the State Theatre closed on June 21, 1990, following an evening showing of the Donald Petrie film Opportunity Knocks. The news made the front page of the Argus Leader with locals lamenting the closure and calling for the preservation of the building, as the city's other historic movie theaters had been demolished.

Following the closure of the State Theatre, a group of investors signed a five-year lease to renovate and operate it as a music venue. The State reopened with a rock concert featuring two local bands on January 25, 1991. The concert venue project was scrapped following its three-week trial run.

In the spring of 1992, a different pair of investors, Herb Roe and Doug Henricks, purchased the building intending to convert it into a performing arts center. By winter, the Argus Leader reported that a renovation of the theater reached the halfway point and its owners planned to apply for listing on the National Register of Historic Places. In September 1993, the theater owners said that its reopening was contingent on the approval of a liquor license; otherwise, the building would be torn down. The city approved the license on November 15.

In July 1994, Minneapolis-based Classic Theatres Corp. offered to buy the venue and operate it as a second-run cinema but backtracked because the deed authored by the former owner, Midco Theatre Corp., stipulated an extensive waiting period before new films could be screened. Later that month, as work stalled because required fireproofing upgrades were too costly, the State Theatre faced a potential demolition. A real estate developer wanted to buy the theater and demolish it as he planned to construct an office complex on the adjacent lot. As a result, Roe sought to buy out Henricks's share and take out a loan to continue renovations.

In October 1994, Roe and Henricks listed the State Theatre for sale. Despite interest from various groups, the venue went without a buyer for years. By 1996, Henricks had bought out Roe's share and had negotiated with multiple groups interested in operating the State. In 2001, the Sioux Falls Film Society purchased the building for $200,000. The group's subsequent renovations included a roof repair to prevent water damage.

In 2005, the Sioux Falls State Theatre Company purchased the venue. By 2013, the organization raised $2.3 million for renovations. On December 11, 2020, the State Theatre reopened to the public with a screening of the film White Christmas.
