= Kanabec County Courthouse =

- U.S. National Register of Historic Places
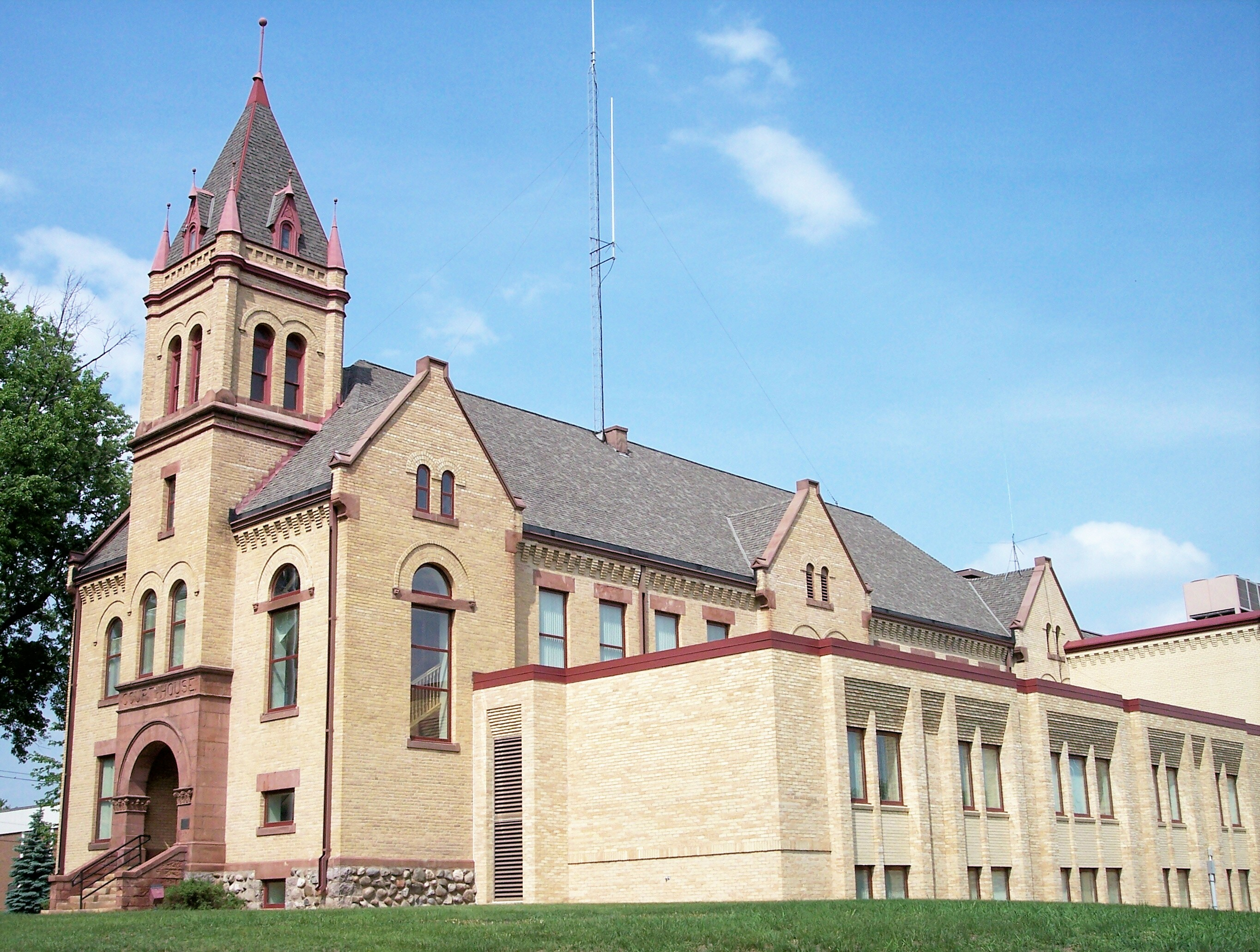

- Location within Minnesota Location within the United States
- Interactive map showing the location of Kanabec County Courthouse
- Location: 18 N. Vine St., Mora, Minnesota
- Coordinates: 45°52′38.77″N 93°17′37.24″W
- Area: 1 acre (0.40 ha)
- Built: 1894
- Architect: Buechner and Jacobson
- Architectural style: Romanesque
- NRHP reference No.: 77000748
- Added to NRHP: April 11, 1977

The Kanabec County Courthouse, located at 18 Vine Street North in Mora, Kanabec County in the U.S. state of Minnesota is a beige brick, Romanesque building, featuring a prominent 4-story center tower. The courthouse sits on a stone foundation. Arched windows and doorways with brown sandstone sills lend distinction. The eaves were built with unusual corbelled brick and the corners of the tower are decorated with tourelles. Hardwood floors and oak balusters lead to the second-floor courtrooms. Charles Skoglund built the building in 1894 for $7,200.

It was designed by architects Buechner and Jacobson.
