= Otter Tail County Courthouse =

- U.S. National Register of Historic Places
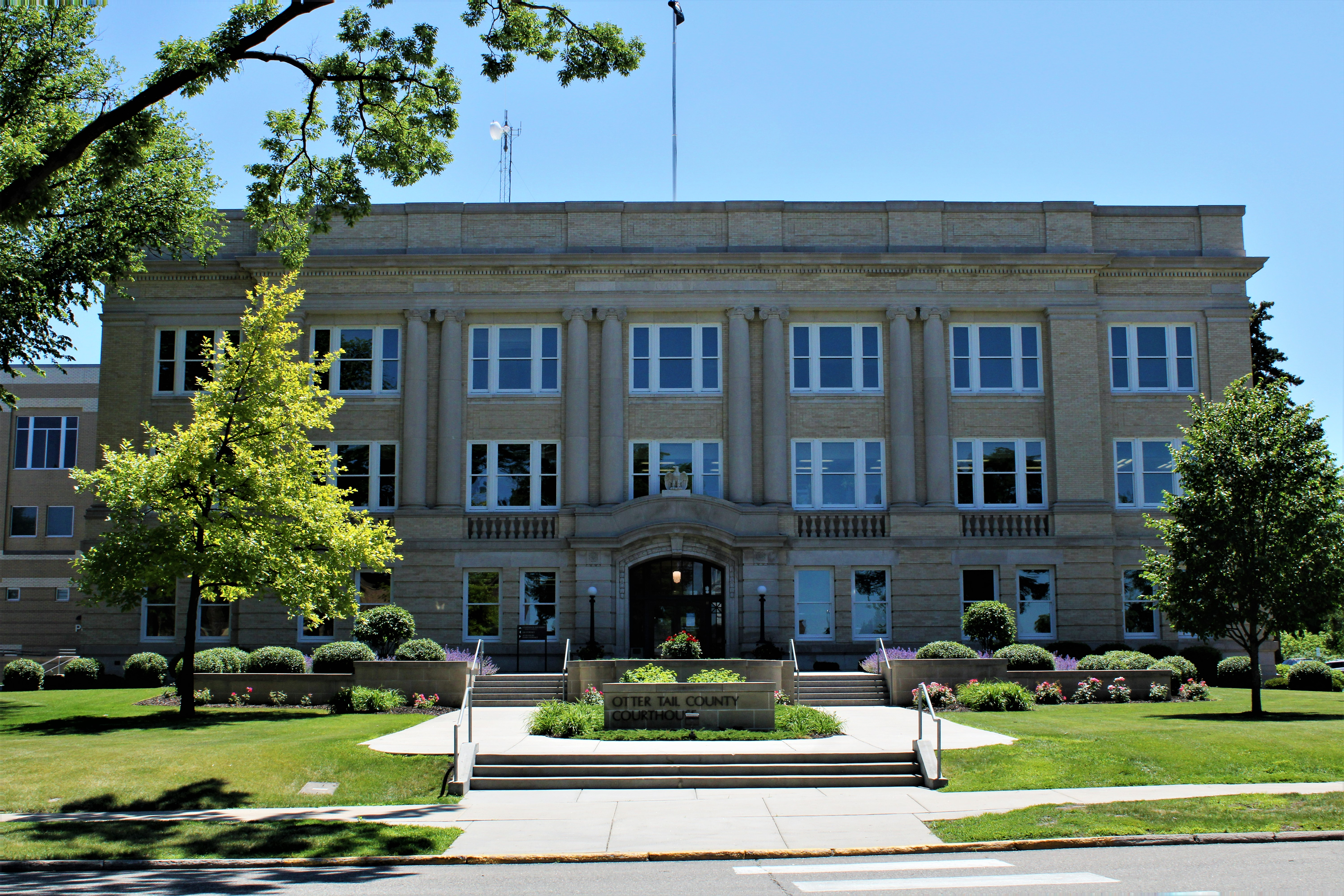

- Location within Minnesota Location within the United States
- Location: 121 W. Junius Ave. Fergus Falls, Minnesota
- Coordinates: 46°16′48″N 96°04′30″W
- Area: less than one acre
- Built: 1922, 1972
- Architect: Buechner & Orth
- Architectural style: Beaux Arts
- NRHP reference No.: 84001637
- Added to NRHP: May 10, 1984

The Otter Tail County Courthouse is the seat of county government and a historic building located in Fergus Falls, Minnesota, United States. Otter Tail County's first county seat was Ottertail City. After the decline of that city, it was moved to Fergus Falls in 1872. The previous courthouse was completed in 1881, and it was damaged by a tornado in June 1919. A bond issue was defeated by county voters in August of the same year because of confusion over whether the county was going to build a new courthouse, repair the old building, or wait for building costs to decrease. Another storm took off part of the courthouse's temporary roof a short time later. In November 1920, Judge William L. Parsons ruled that Otter Tail County no longer had a courthouse. That allowed the county commissioners to issue bonds and levy a 1% property tax to build a new building.

The present courthouse was designed by the St. Paul architectural firm of Buechner & Orth, and it was completed in 1922 by L.P. Jorgenson for $322,000. The three-story brick and Bedford stone structure is an excellent example of the Beaux Arts style, although it is similar to other courthouses of the same style in the state. The law enforcement center was built behind the courthouse in 1962. Designed by Glenn W. Cording Associates, the same light color brick was used so it blends in with the older courthouse. The two buildings were joined together in 1972. The courthouse was listed on the National Register of Historic Places in 1984.
