= Grand Forks County Courthouse =

- U.S. National Register of Historic Places
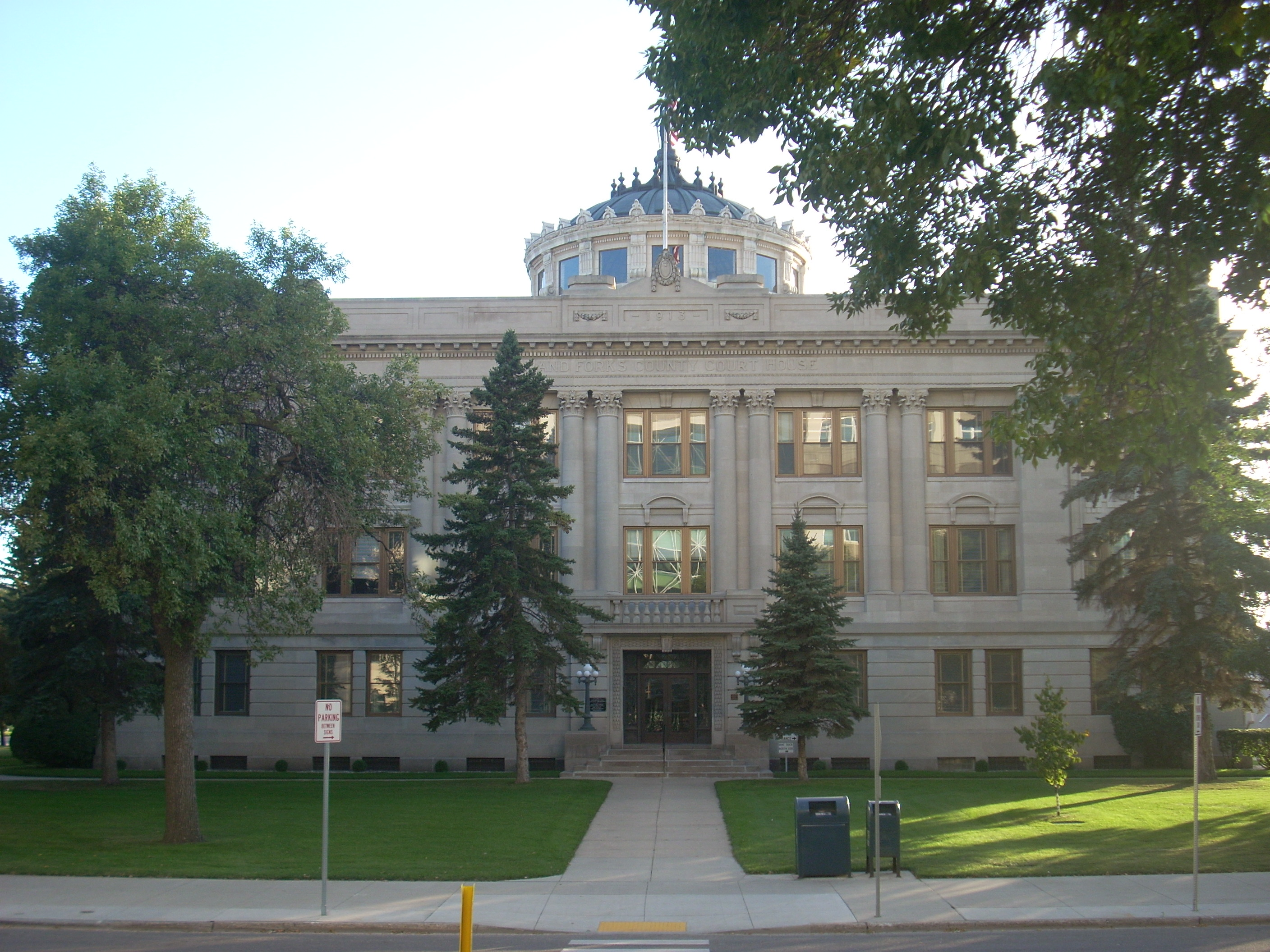
- Building in 2009

- Location within North Dakota Location within the United States
- Interactive map showing the location of Grand Forks County Courthouse
- Location: S. 5th St., Grand Forks, North Dakota
- Coordinates: 47°55′22″N 97°1′46″W
- Built: 1913–1914
- Architect: Buechner & Orth
- Architectural style: Beaux Arts
- MPS: Buechner and Orth Courthouses in North Dakota TR
- NRHP reference No.: 80002913
- Added to NRHP: November 25, 1980

Grand Forks County Courthouse is a Beaux Arts style building in Grand Forks, North Dakota, United States, that was listed on the National Register of Historic Places in 1980. It is a "richly decorated white limestone structure in a modified Classical Revival style, topped with a massive cast iron dome."

It was built between 1913 and 1914 and designed by Buechner & Orth, a Minnesotan architecture firm. The courthouse is identified as the largest and most expensive of thirteen B&O-designed county courthouses in North Dakota built from 1905 until 1919.

Considerable additional detail on the building is provided in its NRHP nomination document. The NRHP listing was for just the one contributing building, with no specific property area identified.
