= The Bismarck Tribune =

Daily newspaper published in Bismarck, North Dakota, U.S.

- The March 1, 2012 front page of The Bismarck Tribune
- Type: Daily newspaper
- Owner: Lee Enterprises
- Founder: Clement A. Lounsberry
- Editor: Blake Nicholson
- Founded: July 11, 1873; 153 years ago
- Language: English
- Circulation: 22,006 Daily (as of 2023)
- ISSN: 2330-5967 (print); 2330-5975 (web)
- OCLC number: 11987205
- Website: bismarcktribune.com

The Bismarck Tribune is a newspaper in Bismarck, North Dakota. Owned by Lee Enterprises, it is the only daily newspaper for south-central and southwest North Dakota. It was the first paper established in Bismarck and was the oldest continually published in the state until printing was moved to South Dakota in 2026.

== History ==
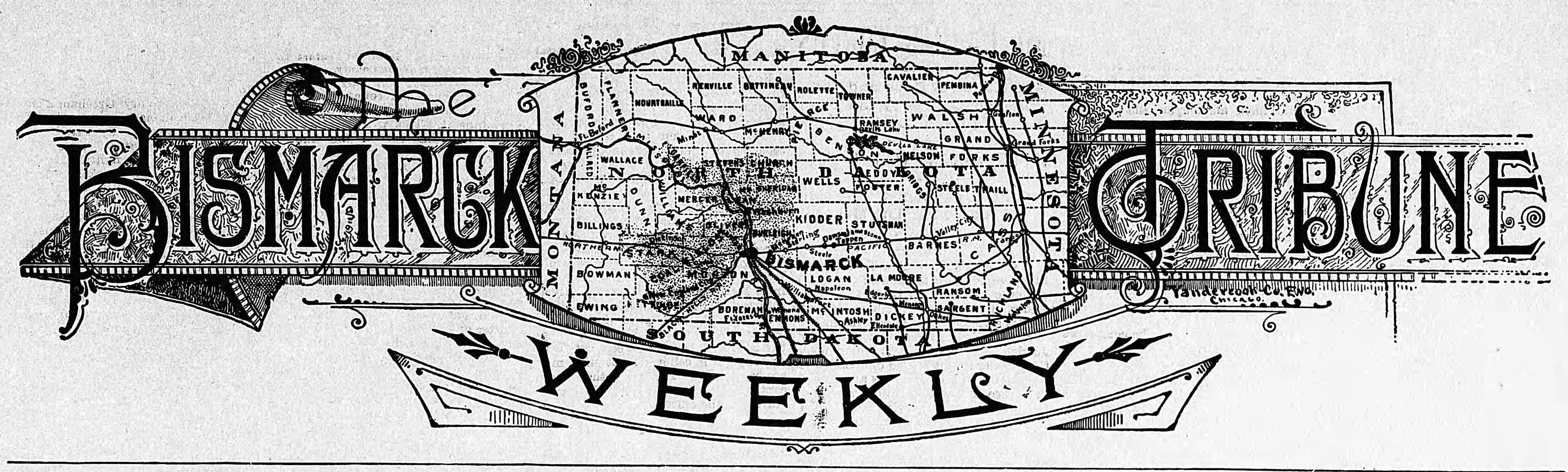
Bismarck Weekly Tribune nameplate, 1895

On July 11, 1873, Clement A. Lounsberry published the first edition of the Bismarck Tribune. Three years later Lounsberry, an American Civil War veteran, planned to accompany George Custer and the 7th Cavalry Regiment to Montana. However, a family member became sick, so he hired stringer Mark H. Kellogg to go in his place.

A month later Kellogg was killed at the Battle of the Little Bighorn. He is considered the first Associated Press correspondent to die in the line of duty. Lounsberry learned of the massacre after the steamship Far West returned to Bismarck. He wrote the first complete account of the battle in the Tribune and telegraphed the 50,000 word story to The New York Herald, breaking the news to the world.

In 1878, Lounsberry sold the Tribune to Stanley Huntley and Marshall H. Jewell. A year later Huntley left to go interview Sitting Bull for the Chicago Tribune and was replaced by Lounsberry. In 1881, the paper expanded into a daily and was renamed to the Bismarck Daily Tribune. In 1884, Lounsberry disposed of his interests, leaving Jewell as its sole proprietor. In 1911, Jewell died after publishing the Tribune for three decades. His widow Katherine T. Jewell inherited the business.

A year later the Bismarck Tribune Co. was reorganized. Judge George T. Flannery was elected president, banker C.B. Little was elected treasurer and Mrs. Jewell was elected secretary. By 1916, Little and political boss Alexander McKenzie were the controlling owners, with Mrs. Jewell retaining a minority stake.

In February 1917, the company was declared defunct and entered into the receivership of Little. A month later the Tribune was sold at auction to former senator Edmond A. Hughes for $13,600. That October, news editor George D. Mann and advertising manager Ensley A. Weir bought the paper. Weir left the Tribune a month later. In 1926, Lounsberry died and was buried at Arlington National Cemetery.

In 1934, Lounsberry was inducted into the North Dakota Newspaper Hall of Fame, followed two years later by Jewell. In 1936, Mr. Mann died. His widow Stella I. Mann then operated the paper. In 1938, the Tribune won the Pulitzer Prize for Public Service after publishing a series of articles called "Self-Help in the Dust Bowl."

In 1962, Mrs. Mann's nephew A. Glenn Sorlie, the son of former governor Arthur G. Sorlie, succeeded her as publisher. In 1973, Mrs. Mann died. At that time Sorlie became company president. In 1978, Lee Enterprises acquired a 53% interest in the paper. In 1981, Mrs. Mann became the first woman inducted into the North Dakota Newspapers Hall of Fame. In 1993, A. Glenn Sorlie died. In 1999, A. Glenn Sorlie was inducted into the hall of fame.

In 2020, the Tribune moved to a six-day printing schedule, eliminating its printed Sunday edition. The Tribune ceased printing in Bismarck on May 1, 2026, and moved to a three-day printing schedule. The Tribune is currently printed in Rapid City, South Dakota and delivered by U.S. Mail.

In July 2026, the Tribune's former headquarters at 707 E. Front Avenue were purchased at auction by Prairie View Properties LLP of Mandan, North Dakota for $1,025,000.

== See also ==
- List of newspapers in North Dakota
