= Roberts County Courthouse (South Dakota) =

- U.S. National Register of Historic Places
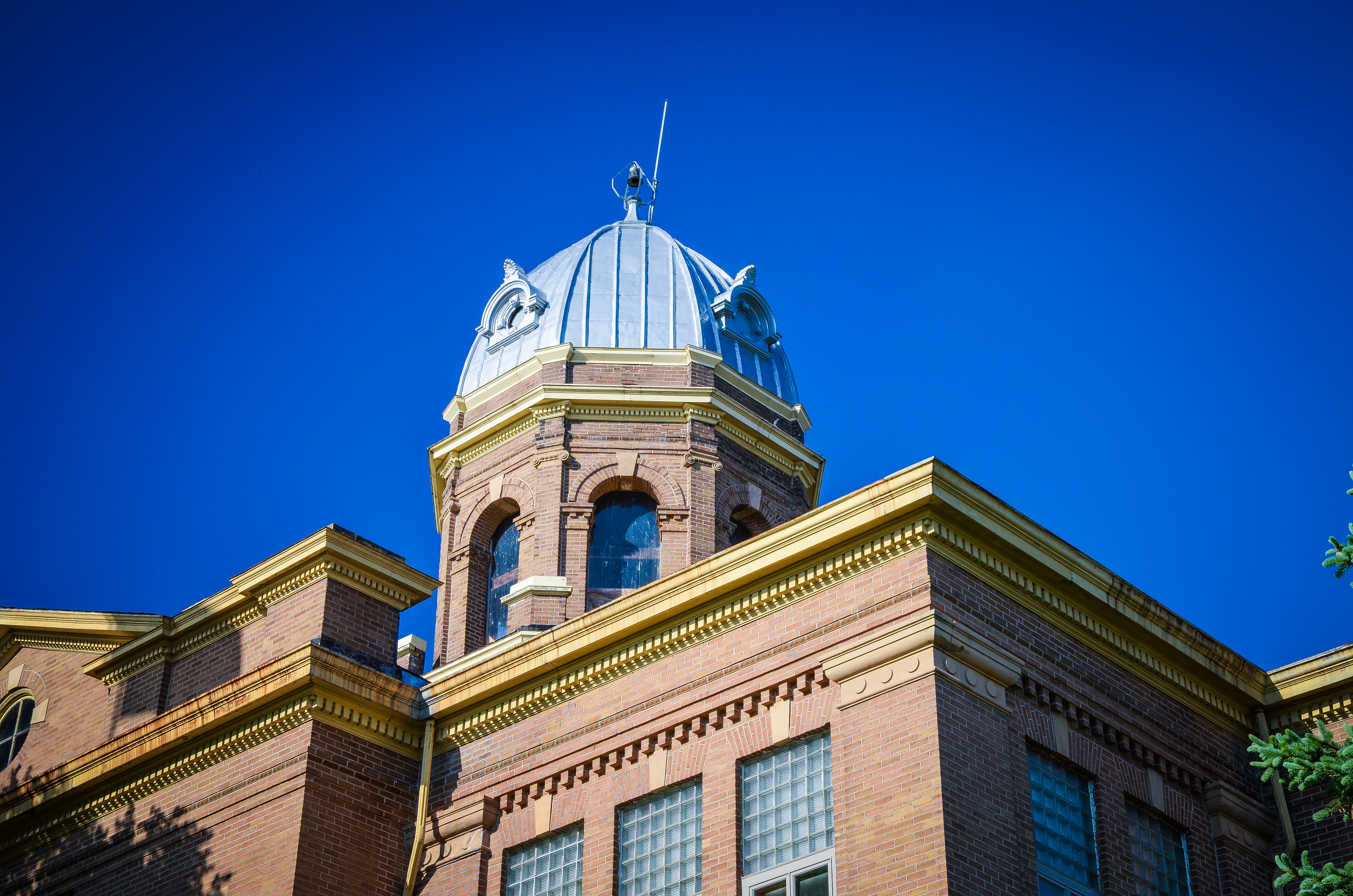

- Location within South Dakota Location within the United States
- Interactive map showing the location of Roberts County Courthouse
- Location: 411 2nd Ave. East, Sisseton, South Dakota
- Coordinates: 45.664228°N 97.047680°W
- Built: 1902
- Architectural style: Renaissance Revival
- NRHP reference No.: 76001755
- Added to NRHP: December 12, 1976

Roberts County Courthouse in Sisseton, South Dakota was built in 1902. It was listed on the National Register of Historic Places in 1976.

It is notable for reflecting the contention between competing towns for the county seat.
