= Foster County Courthouse =

- U.S. National Register of Historic Places
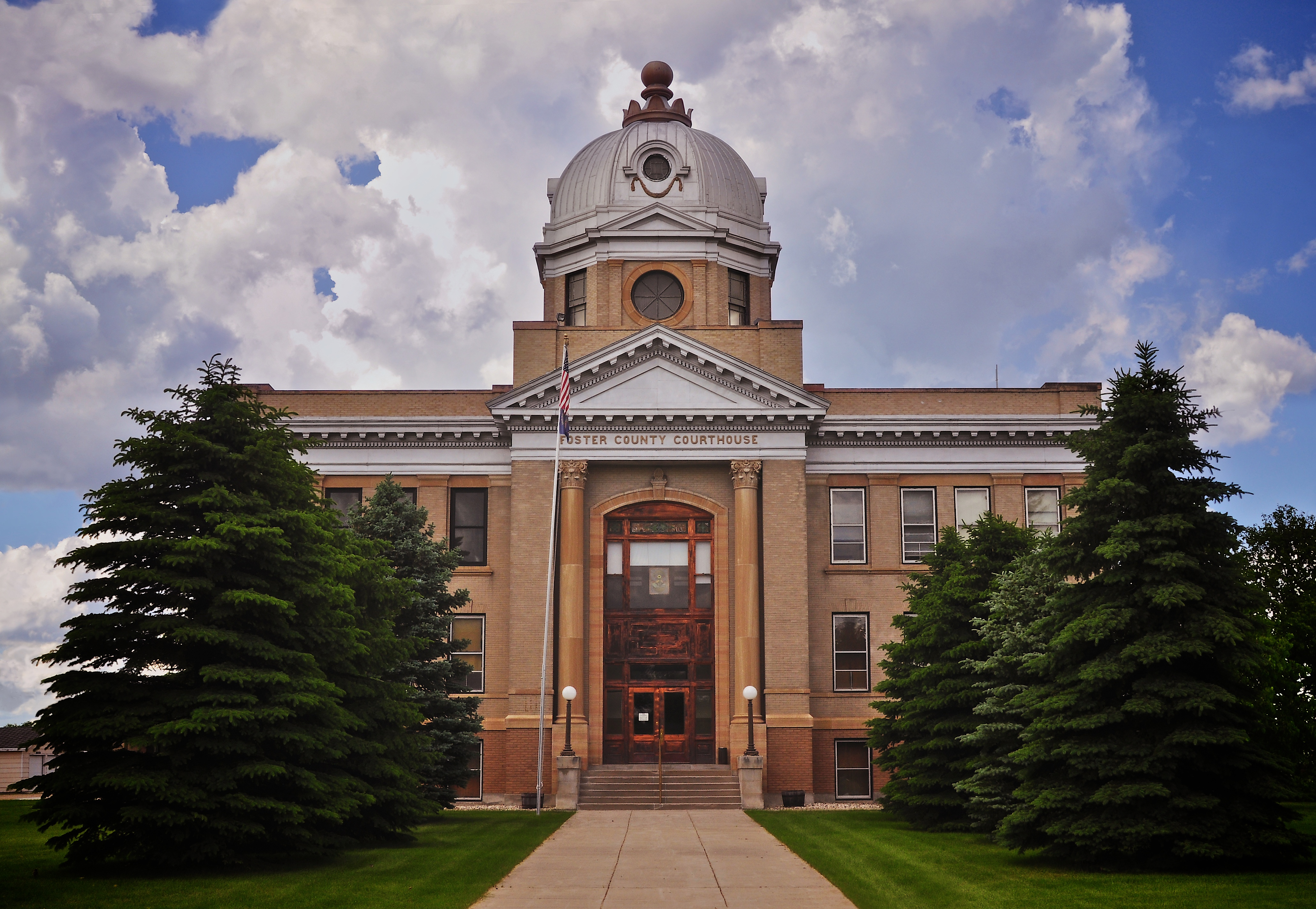

- Location within North Dakota Location within the United States
- Location: 1000 5th St N, Carrington, North Dakota
- Coordinates: 47°27′18″N 99°7′33″W
- Built: 1909
- Architect: Buechner & Orth
- Architectural style: Beaux Arts
- MPS: Buechner and Orth Courthouses in North Dakota TR
- NRHP reference No.: 80002911
- Added to NRHP: November 25, 1980

The Foster County Courthouse in Carrington, North Dakota was built in 1909. It was designed by architects Buechner & Orth in Beaux Arts style. It was listed on the National Register of Historic Places in 1980. The listing includes two contributing buildings.

The listing includes the courthouse and also a sheriff's residence/jail building to its north, which is a two-story brick building.
