= Hillsboro Banner =

Weekly newspaper in Hillsboro, North Dakota

- Type: Weekly newspaper
- Format: Broadsheet
- Owner(s): Cory Erickson, Cole & Alyssa Short
- Founder: A. DeLacy Wood
- Publisher: Sub-Zero Press, Inc.
- President: Cory Erickson
- Editor: Cole Short
- Founded: 1880; 146 years ago
- Language: English
- Headquarters: 502 W Caledonia Ave Hillsboro, North Dakota 47.4030°N 97.0693°W
- Circulation: 1,400
- OCLC number: 1752077
- Website: hillsborobanner.com

The Hillsboro Banner is a weekly newspaper published in Hillsboro, North Dakota in the United States. It is the oldest weekly publication continuously published in the state of North Dakota.

== History ==
Prior to coming to North Dakota, A. DeLacy Wood founded or published eight short-lived newspapers in towns across Wisconsin and Minnesota. It's believed Wood founded 31 newspapers throughout his life, an average of one new paper every 12 months over three decades. The Fargo Argus described Wood as an "irrepressible, pungent and sometimes caustic editor."

In January 1880, at age 24, Wood leased the Breckenridge Free Press and planned to start his ninth venture in Caledonia, North Dakota called The Northern Signal. The first issue was published in early March 1880. In March 1881, Wood relocated the Signal to Hillsboro, then known as Hill City. In May 1881, Edward D. Barker acquired the printing plant and relaunched the paper as The Trail County Banner.

In July 1884, George E. Bowers, formerly of the Hastings Banner, bought the paper, and sold it in December 1892 to Alvin Schmidt for $4,000. Schmidt published it two decades until he grew sick and died in December 1910 at age 49. His estate then sold the Banner to L.E. George in June 1911.

In March 1917, George was sued for libel by Capt. B.C. Boyd who sought $5,000 in damages for an article that implied he embezzled $65 from the $200 relief fund local residents donated to his company of soldiers and used the stolen money to buy an automobile. A jury found George not guilty, and a judge denied a request for a retrial.

After George died in June 1935, the paper passed to his widow Constance and children Lyle and Vila. In May 1955, William N. Kremer bought the paper from the Georges. In June 1961, Eugene G. Carr bought the paper from Kremer.I n November 1970, Carr became co-owner of the Steele County Press. In May 1971, Carr sold the Banner to Ms. Mylon E. Ash, manager of the Hazen Star. In July 1972, Ash bought the Velva Journal. In October 1972, Ash sold the Banner to Tom Ellingsworth, owner of the Barnesville Record-Review. In March 1983, Ellingsworth appointed Mark Morque as Banner publisher.

In April 1985, Keith Meyer, a high school science teacher, became the owner. In January 1987, Hillsboro High School principal Rick Alfson and his wife Val bought the paper. In April 1991, Henry Kelly, owner of the Walsh County Press, bought the Banner from the Alfsons. At that time Kelly also bought the Dickney County Leader and Oakes Times. Kelly owned six papers when he declared bankruptcy a year later due to debts accrued by his other failing company, DAK Publishing. The Banner was then acquired by Gorman King Jr. in 1994, Sean and Cheryl Kelly in April 2003, and Cory Erickson along with Cole and Alyssa Short in February 2012.
