= Hillsboro, North Dakota =

- City
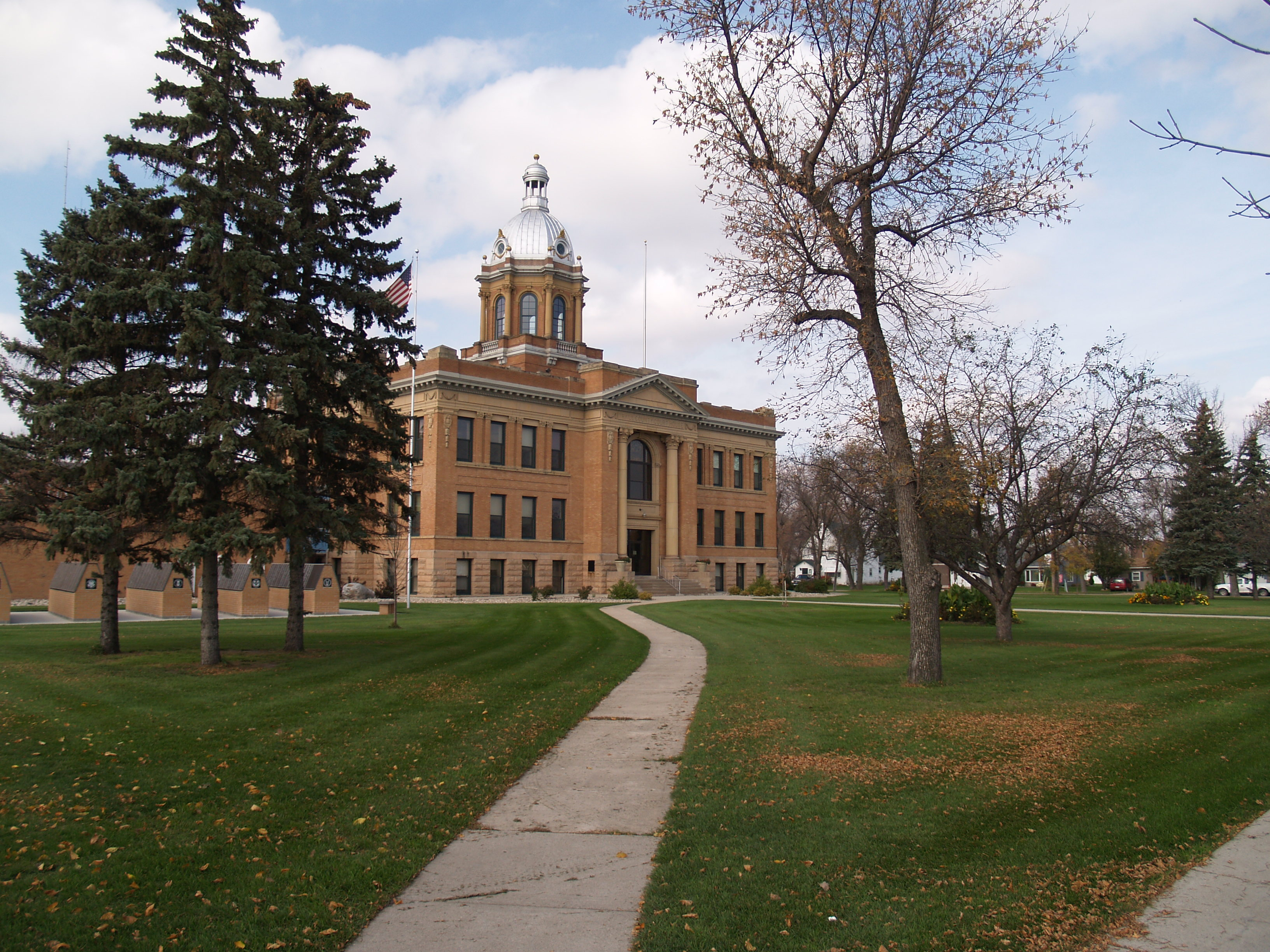
- Traill County Courthouse in Hillsboro

- Logo
- Nickname: "Home of the burros"
- Motto: "Experience Hillsboro"
- Location of Hillsboro, North Dakota
- Coordinates: 47°24′11″N 97°03′48″W
- Country: United States
- State: North Dakota
- County: Traill
- First Settled: Circa 1870
- Founded as "Comstock": 1880
- Established: 1881
- Renamed "Hillsboro": 1883

Government
  - Mayor: Levi Reese

Area
  - Total: 1.11 sq mi (2.88 km^{2})
  - Land: 1.11 sq mi (2.88 km^{2})
  - Water: 0 sq mi (0.00 km^{2})
- Elevation: 906 ft (276 m)

Population (2020)
  - Total: 1,649
  - Estimate (2024): 1,667
  - Density: 1,483.1/sq mi (572.64/km^{2})
- Time zone: UTC-6 (Central (CST))
  - Summer (DST): UTC-5 (CDT)
- ZIP Code: 58045
- Area code: 701
- FIPS code: 38-38100
- GNIS feature ID: 1036092
- Highways: I-29, US 81, ND 200
- Website: hillsboro-nd.com

Hillsboro is a city in Traill County, North Dakota. It is the county seat of Traill County. The population was 1,649 at the 2020 census. Hillsboro was founded in 1881. Hillsboro is approximately 10 miles away from the Red River/North Dakota-Minnesota border.

Hillsboro sits in the fertile Red River Valley. Local agriculture has dominated the area's economy from the beginning. With its location on Interstate 29, halfway between the two metropolitan centers of Greater Grand Forks and Fargo–Moorhead, Hillsboro has seen steady population growth in recent years and has become somewhat of a bedroom community.

== History ==
The area along the Goose River that is now Hillsboro was first settled by German and Norwegian settlers around 1870. In 1880, the present day site of Hillsboro was founded under the name "Comstock". Local folklore tells of the residents of nearby Caledonia, North Dakota turning away a shabby surveyor because of his appearance. This man was then offered hospitality by residents in the tiny settlement of Comstock. The man turned out to be railroad baron James J. Hill.

Hill was so impressed by the kindness showed to him by the residents of this small community that he decided to place his Great Northern Railway there instead of in Caledonia. The name of Comstock was platted as "Hill City" in September 1880 in honor of Mr. Hill. The city was then renamed "Hillsboro" in 1883 after it was discovered that there was already a "Hill City" elsewhere in Dakota Territory, now a part of South Dakota.

The routing of the railroad through Hillsboro gave the young city the motivation to attempt to have the county seat moved there from Caledonia, which had been the seat of Traill County since its organization in 1875. The ensuing contest grew bitter and heated, with Caledonians arming themselves, posting guards in the town, and organizing a committee for defense. Hillsboro residents took to calling the defense committee Tigers of the Jungle and Irreconcilables.

Caledonia went as far as to bring in a professional campaign speaker, Col. W. C. Plummer, to campaign on behalf of the town. His speeches were well-attended but, despite these efforts, Caledonia lost the county seat to Hillsboro in a 1,291 to 218 vote. The Traill County Courthouse was built in Hillsboro in 1905.

In 2001 Hillsboro experienced sustained 100-mph winds that blew down 2,400 trees and 23 miles of powerline and damaged a quarter of the homes in Hillsboro.

In 2006, Hillsboro celebrated its 125th birthday.

== Geography ==
Hillsboro sits on the banks of the Goose River in eastern North Dakota. Located in the center of the fertile Red River Valley, the area around Hillsboro is prime agricultural land and very flat.

According to the United States Census Bureau, the city has a total area of 1.09 square miles (2.82 km^{2}), all land.

=== Climate ===
This climatic region is typified by large seasonal temperature differences, with warm to hot (and often humid) summers and cold (sometimes severely cold) winters. According to the Köppen Climate Classification system, Hillsboro has a humid continental climate, abbreviated "Dfb" on climate maps.

== Demographics ==
Historical population
Census	Pop.	Note	%±
1890	715		—
1900	1,172		63.9%
1910	1,237		5.5%
1920	1,183		−4.4%
1930	1,317		11.3%
1940	1,338		1.6%
1950	1,331		−0.5%
1960	1,278		−4.0%
1970	1,309		2.4%
1980	1,600		22.2%
1990	1,488		−7.0%
2000	1,563		5.0%
2010	1,603		2.6%
2020	1,649		2.9%
2022 (est.)	1,654		0.3%
U.S. Decennial Census; 2020 Census

=== 2010 census ===
As of the census of 2010, there were 1,603 people, 687 households, and 418 families residing in the city. The population density was 1,470.6 inhabitants per square mile (567.8/km^{2}). There were 763 housing units at an average density of 700.0 per square mile (270.3/km^{2}). The racial makeup of the city was 93.9% White, 0.1% African American, 1.5% Native American, 0.6% Asian, 3.0% from other races, and 0.9% from two or more races. Hispanic or Latino of any race were 5.5% of the population.

There were 687 households, of which 31.0% had children under the age of 18 living with them, 49.5% were married couples living together, 7.7% had a female householder with no husband present, 3.6% had a male householder with no wife present, and 39.2% were non-families. 35.7% of all households were made up of individuals, and 17% had someone living alone who was 65 years of age or older. The average household size was 2.28 and the average family size was 2.98.

The median age in the city was 40.5 years. 25.6% of residents were under the age of 18; 6.3% were between the ages of 18 and 24; 22.6% were from 25 to 44; 26.6% were from 45 to 64; and 18.7% were 65 years of age or older. The gender makeup of the city was 49.3% male and 50.7% female.

=== 2000 census ===
As of the census of 2000, there were 1,563 people, 679 households, and 414 families residing in the city. The population density was 1,460.6 inhabitants per square mile (563.9/km^{2}). There were 727 housing units at an average density of 679.4/sq mi (262.3/km^{2}). The racial makeup of the city was 94.82% White, 0.19% African American, 2.05% Native American, 2.11% from other races, and 0.83% from two or more races. Hispanic or Latino of any race were 4.93% of the population.

There were 679 households, out of which 30.6% had children under the age of 18 living with them, 49.5% were married couples living together, 6.6% had a female householder with no husband present, and 38.9% were non-families. 36.7% of all households were made up of individuals, and 20.6% had someone living alone who was 65 years of age or older. The average household size was 2.23 and the average family size was 2.92.

In the city, the population was spread out, with 25.2% under the age of 18, 5.8% from 18 to 24, 25.7% from 25 to 44, 21.9% from 45 to 64, and 21.5% who were 65 years of age or older. The median age was 41 years. For every 100 females, there were 94.6 males. For every 100 females age 18 and over, there were 90.1 males.

The median income for a household in the city was $33,516, and the median income for a family was $42,357. Males had a median income of $30,607 versus $19,769 for females. The per capita income for the city was $17,976. About 6.6% of families and 9.2% of the population were below the poverty line, including 9.4% of those under age 18 and 15.0% of those age 65 or over.

== Economy ==
The economy of Hillsboro, like so many other small, rural towns in North Dakota, is heavily dependent on agriculture. When local farmers have a bad harvest, the Hillsboro economy can also suffer. In turn, when the harvest is good, Hillsboro usually prospers. One of the more obvious effects the agricultural community has had on Hillsboro is found at the American Crystal Sugar sugar beet plant directly north of town. The large plant, located on U.S. Highway 81, has been responsible for both an increase in population and a steady stream of available jobs during the last few decades that it has been open. In addition, the local agriculture-based factories of Degelman Industries and Total Ag Industries has spurred a recent demand for a local workforce.

In recent years, Hillsboro has become a bedroom community for the Greater Grand Forks and Fargo-Moorhead metropolitan areas. This has led to an increase in both population and home construction. The local business community has also been growing with the recent addition of new businesses including 3R Floral, Sundae Brew, and Goose River Brewing. Although not the once bustling downtown area (centered at the intersection of Caledonia Avenue and Main Street) it once was, Hillsboro's downtown has become a new area of development.

=== Economic development ===
Local organizations, including the Hillsboro Economic Development Corporation and the Traill County Economic Development Commission work help with the economic development in the area. A portion of local sales tax revenues is set aside to bolster business development. New businesses and entrepreneurs can request grants or low-interest loans to help promote development in the city.

== Education ==
It is within the Hillsboro Public School District 9. The Hillsboro Public Schools system provides residents with an elementary school and a high school.

The high school offers Advanced Placement classes either as Online Classes, dual credit classes in school, or through Lake Region State College, depending on the class. These classes are worth college credit at most in-state colleges and universities.

In 2003, 40% of students met or exceeded grade-level standards in Math, and 76% of students met or exceeded grade-level standards in English, above-average when compared to the state average of 39% and 61%, respectively.

In 2012, Hillsboro joined a cooperative agreement in all sports with Central Valley School in rural Buxton. The schools remain separate for fine arts competitions.

=== High school championships ===
- State Class 'B' boys basketball: 1973, 1974, 1977, 1981, 2017, 2018
- State Class 'B' girls basketball: 1984
- State Class 'B' volleyball: 2000, 2006
- State Class 'B' boys baseball: 1967, 1968
- State Class 'B' girls gymnastics: 1977, 1981
- State 9-man football: 2008
- State 11-man 'A' football: 2017
- State 11-man '2A' football: 2019
- State Class 'B' Girls Cross Country: 2011, 2012, 2013, 2014, 2015, 2016, 2017, 2018, 2024, 2025

== Culture ==
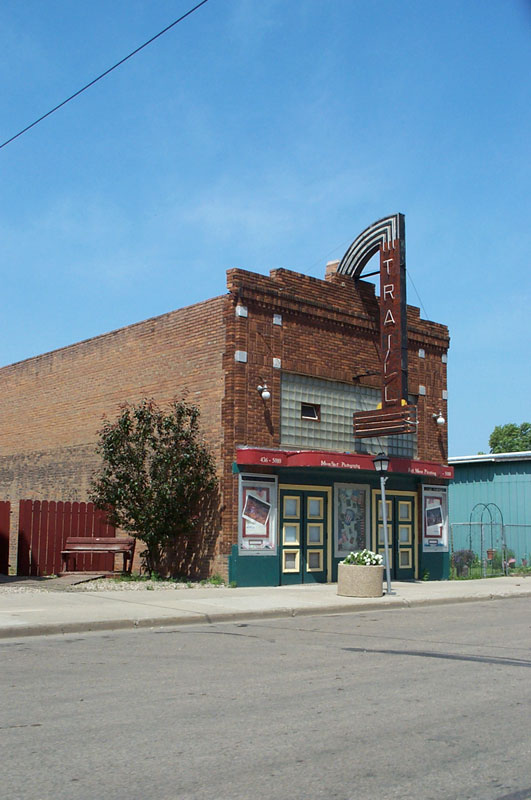
The historic Traill Theatre in Hillsboro

=== Recreation ===
The city of Hillsboro operates a large park on the north side of town. Woodland City Park sits on the banks of the Goose River. It offers a public swimming pool and scenic views of a dam on the river. For many years, there was also a group of deer living in a penned in area of the park, though they no longer reside there. The Goose River Golf Club sits directly north of town. Hillsboro also has railroad park alongside its Main Street to the East, containing a historic railroad caboose and a statute of the local high school mascot, the burro. Railroad Park has become an area of focused improvement by the City Commission, with projects planned to revitalize this green space.

=== Media ===
The local paper is the weekly Hillsboro Banner. The Banner has been published continuously since 1879, making it the oldest weekly newspaper in the state of North Dakota. Hillsboro has no radio stations of its own. Nearby stations include KMAV 105.5 FM and KMSR 1520 AM in nearby Mayville and KRJB 106.5 FM in Ada, Minnesota. Residents have access to radio stations and network affiliates from both Grand Forks and Fargo–Moorhead.

=== Sites of interest ===
- The Amos and Lillie Plummer House, a historic 1897 mansion that has been converted to a museum and restored to its turn of the century elegance
- Traill County Courthouse, a historic building near the center of the town, with a large dome on top, with paintings on the interior. There is a bust of Abraham Lincoln located nearby
- Pioneer Museum, museum complex featuring:

- Centennial Building, military, school, and pioneer collections
- Pioneer Building, agriculture collection
- St. Olaf Chapel, church that resembles small, rural Churches that typify the Red River Valley
- Log Cabin, a log cabin built on the banks of the Red River of the North in the 1870s

== Transportation ==
Residents of Hillsboro have easy access to major population centers via Interstate 29. The Interstate runs on the western edge of the community and there is an interchange (Caledonia Avenue) that connects the Interstate to Hillsboro. U.S. Highway 81 runs through the community and also connects Hillsboro to Grand Forks and Fargo.

Like so many towns in the American Midwest, Hillsboro's streets are aligned in the grid pattern. In Hillsboro, routes that run north to south are called streets and routes that run east to west are called avenues.

The BNSF Railway, eventual successor to the Great Northern, continues to maintain tracks in Hillsboro that see a variety of freight trains every day as well as Amtrak's Empire Builder, which passes through without stopping in the early morning hours. The nearest stations are located in Grand Forks, 40 miles (64 km) to the north, and Fargo, 42 miles (68 km) to the south.

The Hillsboro Municipal Airport is a small airport south of town with a landing strip which provides an area for crop dusters or small private airplanes to stop. However, residents have to travel either to Grand Forks or Fargo in order to take regularly scheduled flights to major airports.

== Notable people ==
- John H. Carkin, Oregon lawyer and politician
- Randy Lemm, member of the North Dakota Senate
- Elmore Y. Sarles, 9th governor of North Dakota
