= Towner, North Dakota =

- City
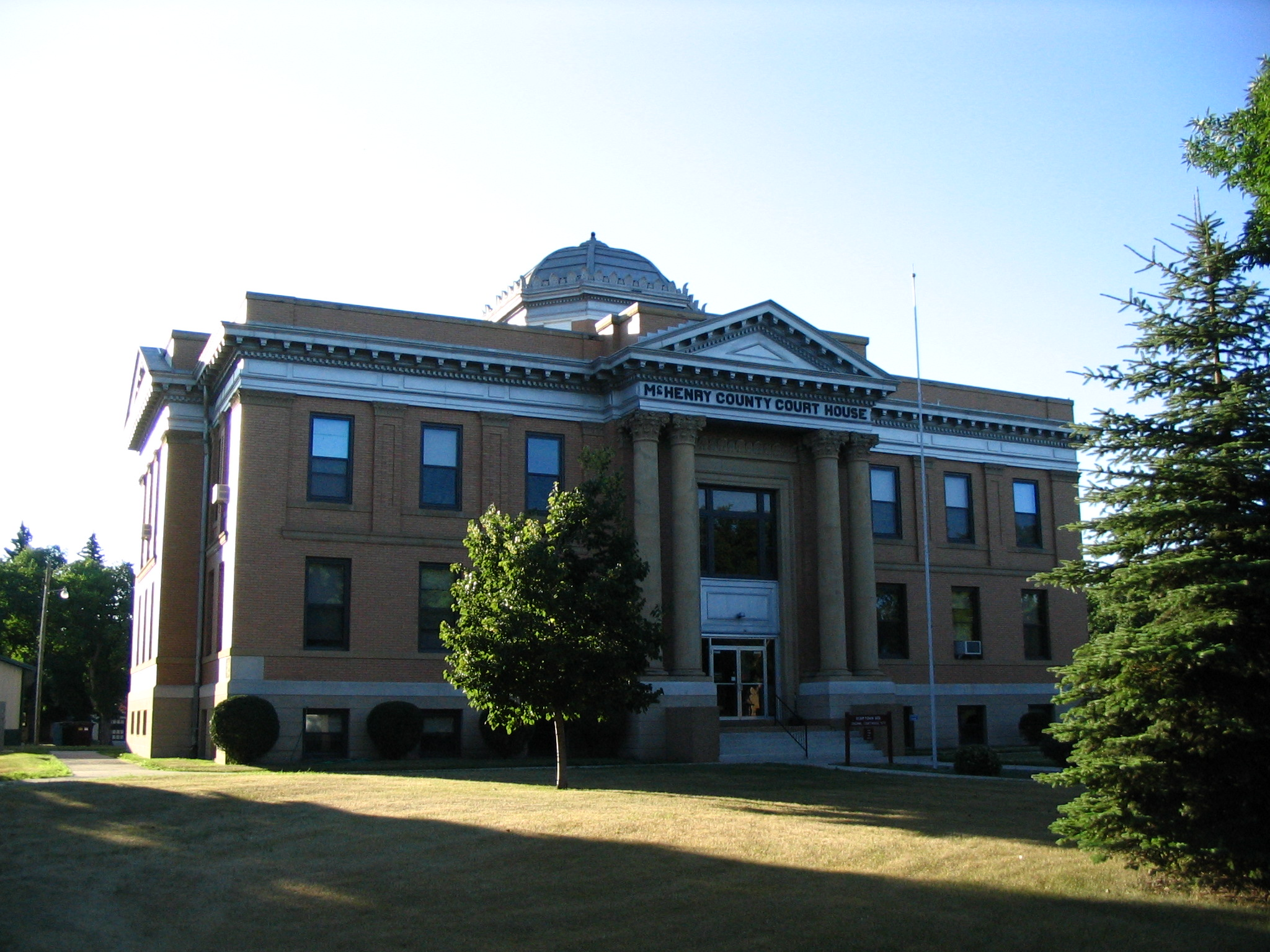
- McHenry County Courthouse in Towner

- Location of Towner, North Dakota
- Coordinates: 48°20′50″N 100°24′25″W
- Country: United States
- State: North Dakota
- County: McHenry
- Founded: 1886

Government
  - Executive Office: Patty Mc Combs

Area
  - Total: 0.83 sq mi (2.14 km^{2})
  - Land: 0.83 sq mi (2.14 km^{2})
  - Water: 0 sq mi (0.00 km^{2})
- Elevation: 1,480 ft (450 m)

Population (2020)
  - Total: 479
  - Estimate (2022): 464
  - Density: 579.3/sq mi (223.68/km^{2})
- Time zone: UTC-6 (Central (CST))
  - Summer (DST): UTC-5 (CDT)
- ZIP code: 58788
- Area code: 701
- FIPS code: 38-79420
- GNIS feature ID: 1036299
- Website: townernd.com

Towner is a city in and the county seat of McHenry County, North Dakota. The population was 479 at the time of the 2020 census. It is part of the Minot Metropolitan Statistical Area. Towner was founded in 1886.

== History ==
Towner sprang up in 1886 with the arrival of the Great Northern Railway into the area. It was named for rancher O. M. Towner.

== Geography ==
According to the United States Census Bureau, the city has a total area of 0.81 square miles (2.10 km^{2}), all land.

== Demographics ==
Historical population
Census	Pop.	Note	%±
1890	211		—
1900	331		56.9%
1910	691		108.8%
1920	610		−11.7%
1930	622		2.0%
1940	918		47.6%
1950	955		4.0%
1960	948		−0.7%
1970	870		−8.2%
1980	867		−0.3%
1990	669		−22.8%
2000	574		−14.2%
2010	533		−7.1%
2020	479		−10.1%
2022 (est.)	464		−3.1%
U.S. Decennial Census; 2020 Census

=== 2010 census ===
As of the census of 2010, there were 533 people, 267 households and 149 families residing in the city. The population density was 658.0 per square mile (254.1/km^{2}). There were 337 housing units at an average density of 416.0 per square mile (160.6/km^{2}). The racial make-up was 96.6% White, 1.9% Native American, 0.6% from other races, and 0.9% from two or more races. Hispanic or Latino of any race were 5.3% of the population.

There were 267 households, of which 22.1% had children under the age of 18 living with them, 43.4% were married couples living together, 9.0% had a female householder with no husband present, 3.4% had a male householder with no wife present, and 44.2% were non-families. 41.6% of all households were made up of individuals, and 24.4% had someone living alone who was 65 years of age or older. The average household size was 2.00 and the average family size was 2.69.

The median age was 49.9 years. 20.5% of residents were under the age of 18; 5.3% were between the ages of 18 and 24; 18.1% were from 25 to 44; 29.1% were from 45 to 64; and 27% were 65 years of age or older. The gender makeup of the city was 48.6% male and 51.4% female.

=== 2000 census ===
As of the census of 2000, there were 574 people, 295 households and 158 families residing in the city. The population density was 694.0 per square mile (268.0/km^{2}). There were 335 housing units at an average density of 405.0 per square mile (156.4/km^{2}). The racial make-up was 97.91% White, 0.35% African American, 0.35% Native American, and 1.39% from two or more races. Hispanic or Latino of any race were 0.87% of the population.

There were 295 households, of which 18.3% had children under the age of 18 living with them, 44.7% were married couples living together, 6.4% had a female householder with no husband present, and 46.4% were non-families. 42.0% of all households were made up of individuals, and 23.1% had someone living alone who was 65 years of age or older. The average household size was 1.95 and the average family size was 2.66.

17.1% of the population were under the age of 18, 6.1% from 18 to 24, 20.7% from 25 to 44, 27.2% from 45 to 64, and 28.9% who were 65 years of age or older. The median age was 50 years. For every 100 females, there were 86.4 males. For every 100 females age 18 and over, there were 82.4 males.

The median household income was $25,536 and the median family income was $44,375. Males had a median income of $29,500 and females $17,375. The per capita income was $19,598. About 3.2% of families and 10.2% of the population were below the poverty line, including 4.4% of those under age 18 and 16.5% of those age 65 or over.

== Attractions ==
- Denbigh Experimental Forest
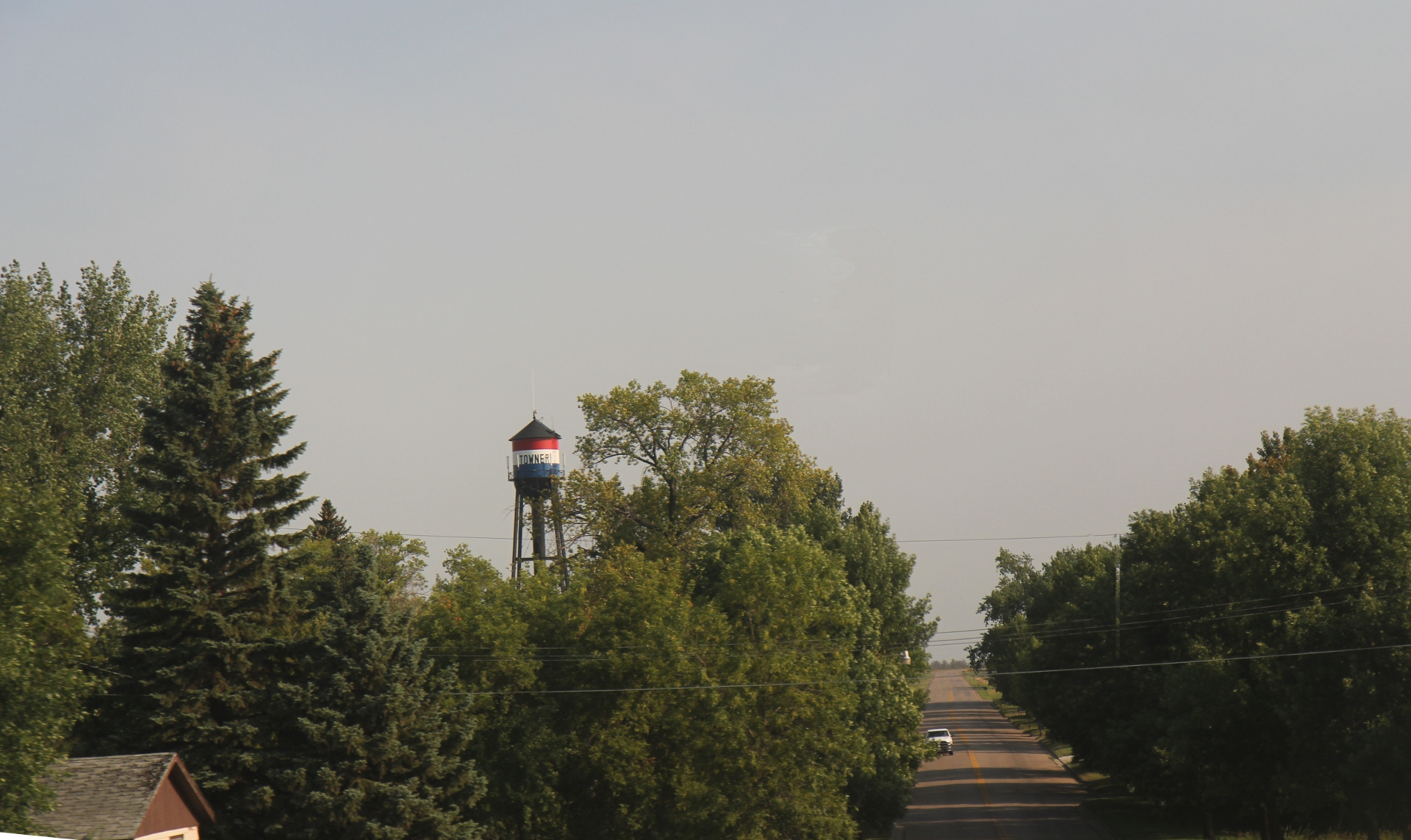
Panorama of Towner

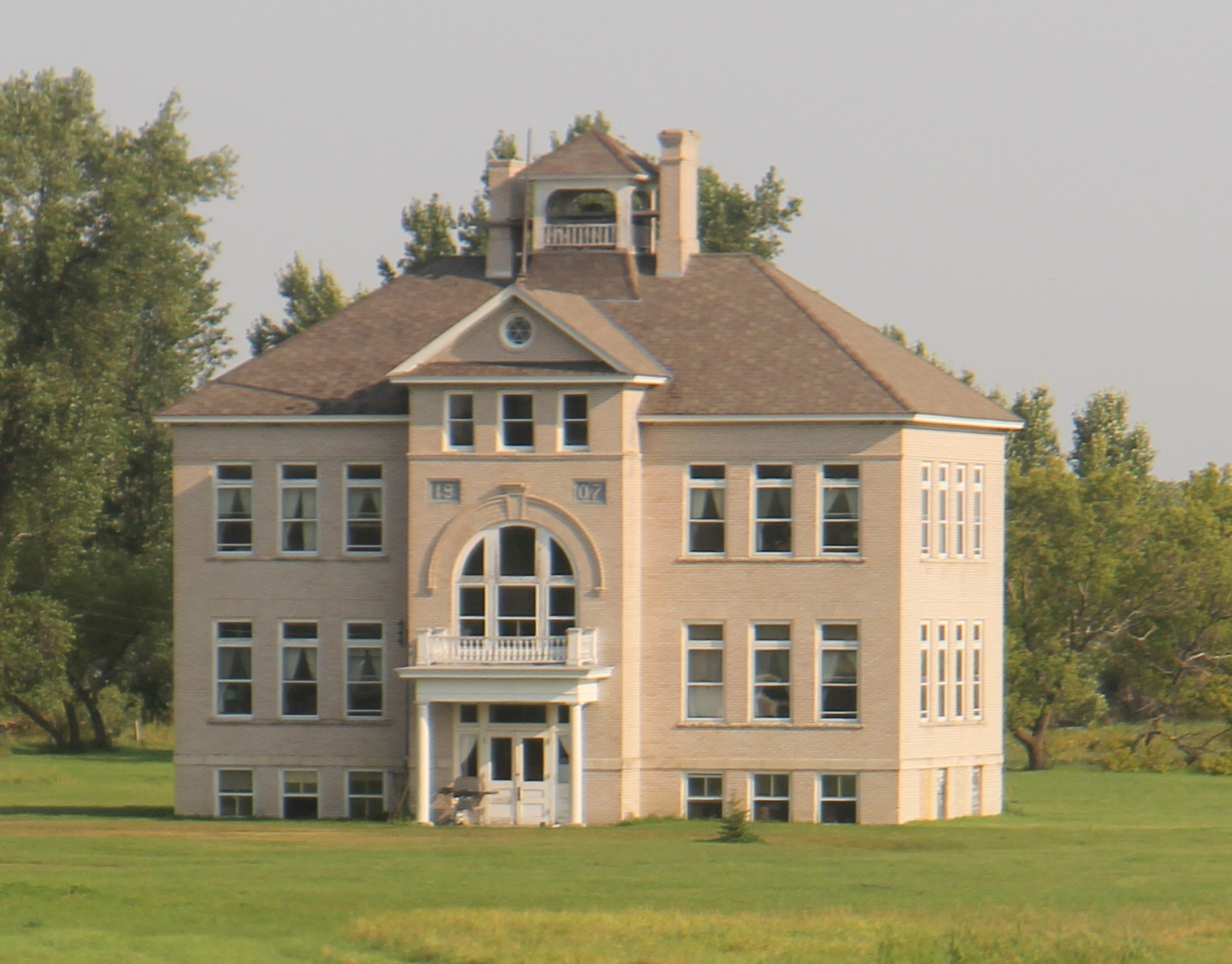
School by Towner

== Transportation ==
Amtrak’s Empire Builder, which operates between Seattle/Portland and Chicago, passes through the town on BNSF tracks, but makes no stop. The nearest station is located in Rugby, 20 miles (32 km) to the east.

== Climate ==
This climatic region is typified by large seasonal temperature differences, with warm to hot (and often humid) summers and cold (sometimes severely cold) winters. According to the Köppen Climate Classification system, Towner has a humid continental climate, abbreviated "Dfb" on climate maps.

Climate data for Towner 2 NE, North Dakota (1991–2020 normals, extremes 1896–present)
Month	Jan	Feb	Mar	Apr	May	Jun	Jul	Aug	Sep	Oct	Nov	Dec	Year
Record high °F (°C)	58 (14)	63 (17)	79 (26)	95 (35)	106 (41)	106 (41)	111 (44)	105 (41)	103 (39)	95 (35)	76 (24)	67 (19)	111 (44)
Mean daily maximum °F (°C)	18.5 (−7.5)	23.3 (−4.8)	35.7 (2.1)	54.0 (12.2)	68.5 (20.3)	77.2 (25.1)	83.4 (28.6)	83.3 (28.5)	72.6 (22.6)	56.7 (13.7)	37.8 (3.2)	23.8 (−4.6)	52.9 (11.6)
Daily mean °F (°C)	7.2 (−13.8)	11.1 (−11.6)	24.2 (−4.3)	40.7 (4.8)	54.1 (12.3)	63.8 (17.7)	69.2 (20.7)	67.8 (19.9)	57.7 (14.3)	43.0 (6.1)	26.4 (−3.1)	13.1 (−10.5)	39.9 (4.4)
Mean daily minimum °F (°C)	−4 (−20)	−1.0 (−18.3)	12.7 (−10.7)	27.4 (−2.6)	39.7 (4.3)	50.3 (10.2)	55.0 (12.8)	52.4 (11.3)	42.7 (5.9)	29.3 (−1.5)	15.0 (−9.4)	2.3 (−16.5)	26.8 (−2.9)
Record low °F (°C)	−49 (−45)	−48 (−44)	−42 (−41)	−20 (−29)	12 (−11)	25 (−4)	32 (0)	22 (−6)	12 (−11)	−15 (−26)	−34 (−37)	−44 (−42)	−49 (−45)
Average precipitation inches (mm)	0.48 (12)	0.48 (12)	0.78 (20)	0.98 (25)	2.34 (59)	3.80 (97)	2.50 (64)	2.05 (52)	1.56 (40)	1.20 (30)	0.84 (21)	0.66 (17)	17.67 (449)
Average snowfall inches (cm)	6.9 (18)	6.9 (18)	4.6 (12)	3.3 (8.4)	0.8 (2.0)	0.0 (0.0)	0.0 (0.0)	0.0 (0.0)	0.1 (0.25)	2.2 (5.6)	4.6 (12)	10.0 (25)	39.4 (100)
Average precipitation days (≥ 0.01 in)	3.5	3.5	2.7	3.4	5.3	8.2	6.0	5.4	4.3	2.9	3.0	3.7	51.9
Average snowy days (≥ 0.1 in)	3.0	3.1	1.8	1.1	0.2	0.0	0.0	0.0	0.1	0.8	2.3	3.7	16.1
Source: NOAA
