= Turtle Mountain Times =

Weekly newspaper in Belcourt, North Dakota

- Type: Weekly newspaper
- Format: Broadsheet
- Owner: Turtle Mountain Band of Chippewa
- Founded: 1993
- Headquarters: Belcourt, North Dakota, United States
- Circulation: 1,619
- ISSN: 1082-5622
- Website: tmtimes.com

The Turtle Mountain Times is a weekly local newspaper based in Belcourt, North Dakota. It is published in print edition only, and in English.

== History ==
On October 27, 1993, the Turtle Mountain Times was first published. It established by the Turtle Mountain Band of Chippewa Indians. The Times was founded by Richard J. “Jiggers” LaFramboise, at the time the chairman of the Turtle Mountain Band of Chippewa, with assistance from the then owner of Indian Country Today. The first staff worked for a short time at Indian Country Today as part of their training for setting up the newspaper. The establishment of the newspaper was seen as a positive move in shaping the Native American media narrative. The first editor was Robin Poitra-Powell. Despite early assurance of non-interference, Poitra-Powell was fired in 1994 by the tribal council after a disagreement about publishing the minutes of tribal council meetings.
