= West Bay Club =

- U.S. National Register of Historic Places
- Location: Sand Island
- Nearest city: Bayfield, Wisconsin
- Coordinates: 46.97197°N 90.97641°W
- Built: 1913
- Architect: Buechner & Orth
- Architectural style: Rustic
- NRHP reference No.: 14000385
- Added to NRHP: July 28, 2015

The West Bay Club is located on Sand Island of the Apostle Islands National Lakeshore.

== History ==
The clubhouse was built for people with allergic rhinitis from Saint Paul, Minnesota and was designed by Buechner & Orth. It was added to the Wisconsin State Register of Historic Places in 2014 and to the National Register of Historic Places the following year.
