= McIntosh County Courthouse (North Dakota) =

Historic government building in North Dakota, United States

- U.S. National Register of Historic Places
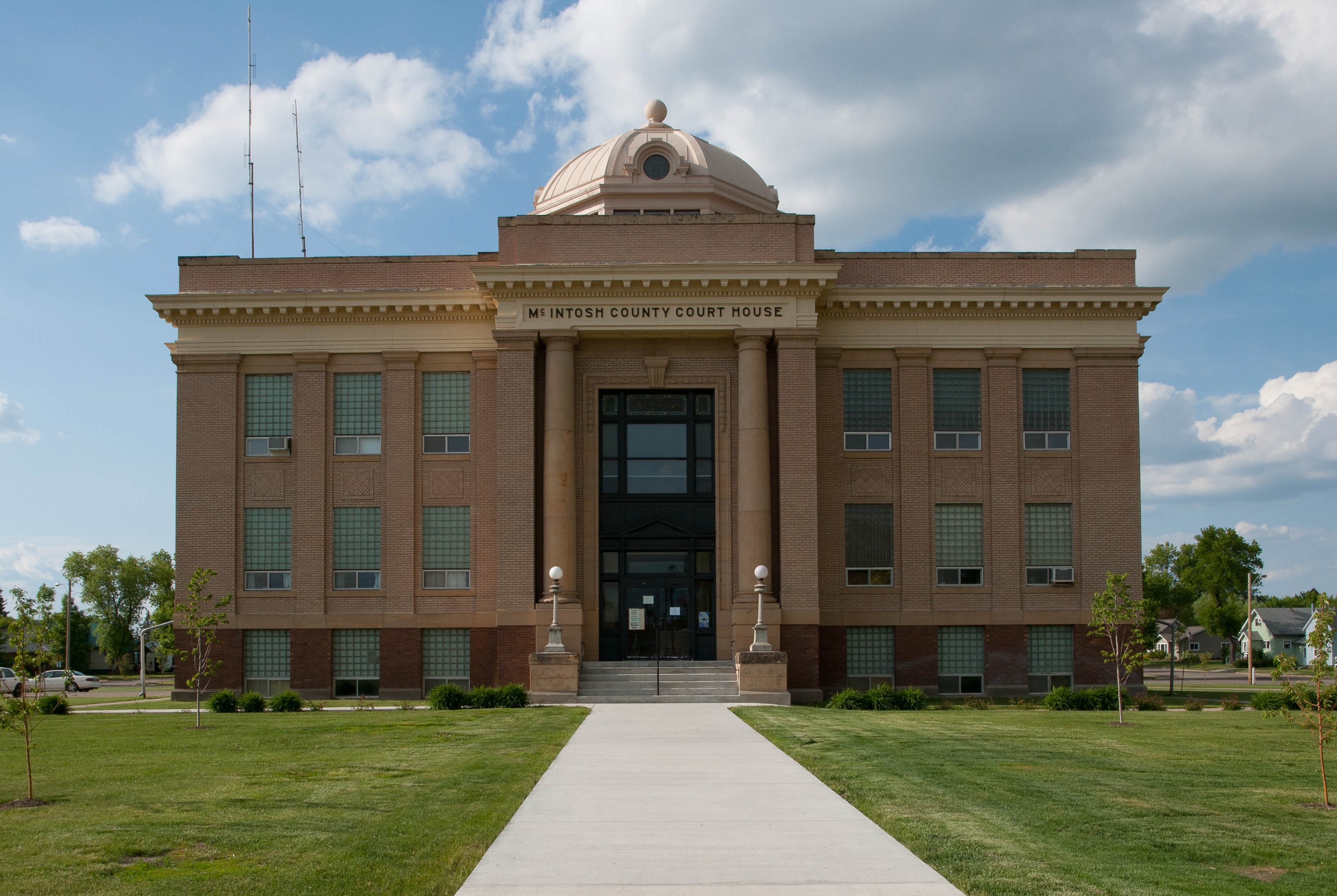

- Location within North Dakota Location within the United States
- Location: 112 1st St. NE, Ashley, North Dakota
- Coordinates: 46.03601°N 99.3711°W
- Built: 1919
- Architect: Buechner & Orth
- Architectural style: Beaux Arts
- MPS: Buechner and Orth Courthouses in North Dakota TR
- NRHP reference No.: 80002918
- Added to NRHP: November 25, 1980

McIntosh County Courthouse in Ashley, North Dakota was built in 1919,to serve the surrounding county.

It is one of thirteen Beaux Arts Neo-Classical courthouses in North Dakota designed by the architectural firm of Buechner & Orth.

The courthouse was listed on the National Register of Historic Places in 1980.

At the southwest corner of the courthouse square stands the Pioneer Fathers and Mothers Monument. It was sponsored by the Ashley Women's Club and dedicated during Ashley's Golden Jubilee year of 1938.
