= Traill County Courthouse =

- U.S. National Register of Historic Places
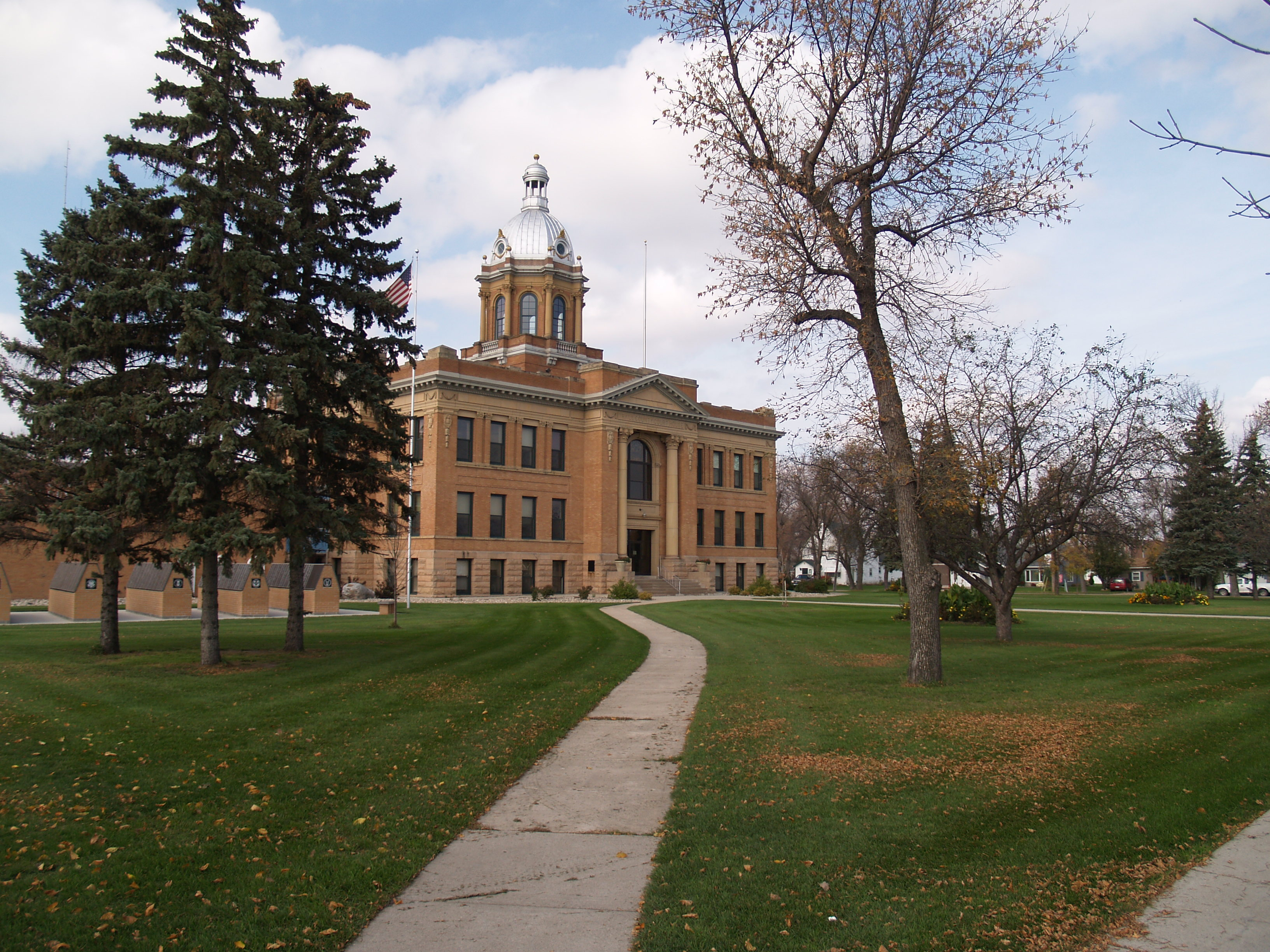

- Location within North Dakota Location within the United States
- Location: 114 W Caledonia Ave, Hillsboro, North Dakota
- Coordinates: 47°24′13″N 97°3′48″W
- Built: 1905
- Architect: Buechner & Orth; Kurke Associates
- Architectural style: Beaux Arts
- MPS: Buechner and Orth Courthouses in North Dakota TR
- NRHP reference No.: 80002928
- Added to NRHP: November 25, 1980

The Trail County Courthouse in Hillsboro, North Dakota is a Beaux Arts building that was built in 1905. It was designed by Buechner & Orth and has a tall domed tower.

In 1955 an International Style addition was built by architects Kurke Associates of Fargo.

It was listed on the National Register of Historic Places in 1980.
