= Pierce County Courthouse (Wisconsin) =

- U.S. National Register of Historic Places
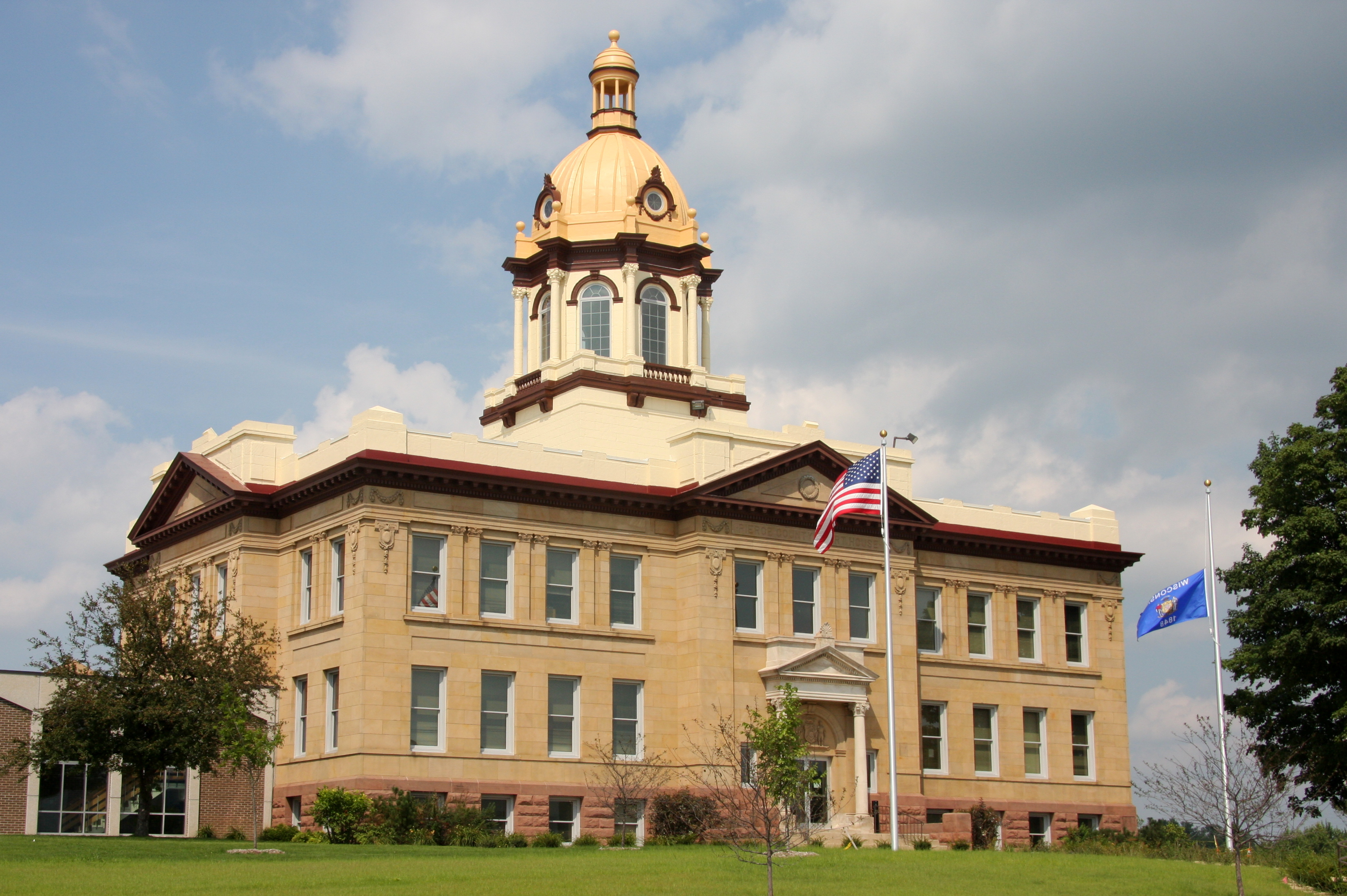
- Front of the courthouse

- Location within Wisconsin Location within the United States
- Interactive map showing the location of Pierce County Courthouse
- Location: 411 W. Main St., Ellsworth, Wisconsin
- Coordinates: 44°43′57″N 92°29′5″W
- Area: 2.5 acres (1.0 ha)
- Built: 1905
- Architect: Buechner & Orth
- Architectural style: Beaux Arts, Neoclassical
- MPS: County Courthouses of Wisconsin TR
- NRHP reference No.: 82000696
- Added to NRHP: March 9, 1982

The Pierce County Courthouse is a historic governmental building in Ellsworth, Wisconsin, United States. Built-in 1905, the courthouse sits on the edge of Ellsworth's business district. Built on a raised foundation of sandstone, it features elements of both the Beaux-Arts and the Neoclassical styles of architecture. Among the distinctive elements of its construction are a large hexagonal dome and multiple Ionic columns.

In 1982, the Pierce County Courthouse was listed on the National Register of Historic Places, qualifying because of its historically significant architecture.
