= Pierce County Courthouse (North Dakota) =

- U.S. National Register of Historic Places
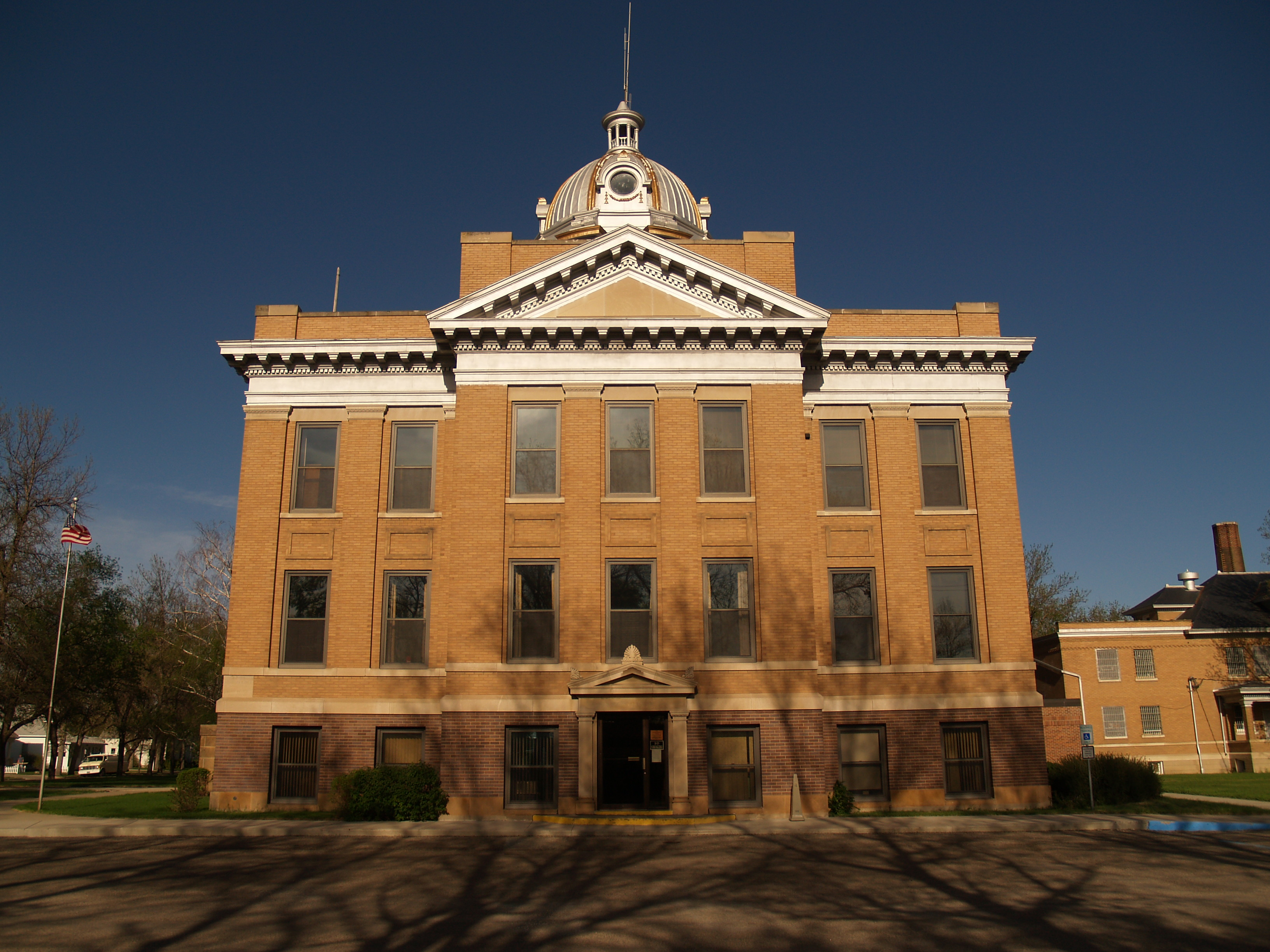
- Pierce County Courthouse in 2008

- Location within North Dakota Location within the United States
- Interactive map showing the location of Pierce County Courthouse
- Location: 240 2nd St SE, Rugby, North Dakota
- Coordinates: 48°22′6″N 99°59′26″W
- Built: 1908
- Architect: Buechner & Orth
- Architectural style: Beaux Arts
- MPS: Buechner and Orth Courthouses in North Dakota TR
- NRHP reference No.: 80002924
- Added to NRHP: November 25, 1980

The Pierce County Courthouse in Rugby, North Dakota was built in 1908. It was designed by St. Paul, Minnesota architects Buechner & Orth in Beaux Arts or Modified Renaissance style. It was listed on the National Register of Historic Places in 1980 as part of a multiple property submission for Buechner and Orth Courthouses in North Dakota.

The front facade of the building is constructed of brown Hebron pressed brick with Beford stone trim and features paired stone columns. The building includes a central tower with columns and arched windows topped by a silver-colored dome. The dome has a diameter of 28 feet and extends to a height of 100 feet from the grade line. A newspaper article in 1910 noted: "The dome is one of the show features of the court house and has no equal at the present time in the state." The interior features four murals depicting historic scenes from Pierce County.

A shield above the main entrance displays the Latin words "PAX" and "LEX." The interior rotunda and main entry hall feature purple (or dark red) marble wainscoting and pink marble pilasters. The building included a meeting room for the county commissioners and offices for the county auditor, treasurer, and register of deeds. The courtroom on the second floor has an ornamental beamed ceiling.

The historic site includes a two-story structure originally used as the sheriff's residence and jail located to the southeast of the courthouse.

In 1911, shortly after the courthouse opened, district judge John Cowan was impeached and charged with drunken behavior, disorderly conduct, and assault. One of the incidents involved an allegation that he tried "to forcibly kiss a woman in the Pierce County courthouse at Rugby." Cowan was acquitted of the charges in a trial before the North Dakota Senate.

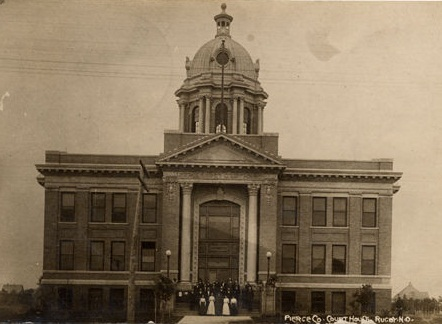
The courthouse c. 1913
