= List of neighborhoods in Minot, North Dakota =

Minot is generally divided into three areas: North Hill, the Souris River Valley and South Hill. The following list shows neighborhoods within these subdivisions.

== North Hill ==
- Davis Addition
- Northern Lights Addition
- University Heights

== The Valley ==
- Bel Air
- Downtown
- Eastwood Park
- Minot State University
- Oak Park
- Parkland
- Spring Lake
- Torbenson
- West Minot
- West Oaks

== South Hill ==
- Anthony Hill
- Boston Heights
- Charlesbois
- Dakota Square Mall
- Southwest Minot
- Summit Park
- Upper Brooklyn
- Warrendale
- Woodridge
