= Geography of Minot, North Dakota =

Minot, North Dakota, is located in the Drift Prairie region of north central North Dakota, at 48°13′59″N 101°17′32″W.

According to the U.S. Census Bureau, the city has a total area of 14.6 sq mi (38 km^{2}). It is almost entirely land; the Souris River, its numerous surrounding oxbow lakes, and a few creeks take up just 0.14% of the city's total landmass.

The elevation of the river at the city center is 1,556 feet (474 m). The valley sits some 160 feet (49 m) below the surrounding plains; the elevation at the Minot International Airport on "North Hill" is 1,716 feet (523 m).

The city is located along the Souris River (also known as the Mouse River), some 30 km from its southernmost point near Velva. It eventually turns northwest and meets with the Assiniboine River, which eventually flows into Hudson Bay.

The population of Richardson's ground squirrels is extremely high in the inner-city area where there are fewer predators to hunt them. This has been known to cause issues with the squirrels tearing up fields with their tunneling, and causing minor property damage by hollowing out areas beneath structures.

== Relative to other locations ==
Minot is about 170 km (110 mi) north of Bismarck, 330 km (210 mi) west of Grand Forks, 385 km (239 mi) southeast of Regina, Saskatchewan and 425 km (264 mi) northwest of Fargo and 450 km (280 mi) southwest of Winnipeg, Manitoba. Outside Minot, the closest cities are Burlington to the west, and Surrey to the east. The unincorporated community of Ruthville lies between Minot and Minot AFB to the north. To the southeast along US 52, there is the unincorporated community of Logan. The nearest community to the south of Minot is Max, over 40 km distant. The near-desolate towns of Drady and Saron are also near Minot.

Important cities in the region for which Minot is the trading center include Bottineau, Garrison, New Town, Rugby, Stanley, and Velva.

Cities in the "Greater Minot" area, including unincorporated(~) cities

- Minot AFB (5,521) + Ruthville (191)
- Burlington (1,102) + Brookside
- Surrey (972)

~Gassman ("Trestle Valley")
~Logan (194)
~South Prairie
~Drady
~Saron

== Local grid and address system ==
The city is laid out on a grid-based street system. Streets run north–south and avenues run east–west. Streets are numbered by their block distance east or west of Main Street. Similarly, Avenues are numbered north and south of Central Avenue. Addresses south of Central Avenue are designated south, while addresses north of Central are designated north. Similarly, addresses east of Main Street are designated east, while addresses west of Main are designated west. There are four city quadrants (NW, SW, SE, NE) to describe the exact location of any given address. Main Street addresses are simply designated North and South. Central Avenue addresses are simply designated East and West.

== Major streets ==
North-South:

- 16th Street West
- 6th and 8th Streets West
- Broadway (US 83)
- 3rd Street East
- Valley Street (Bus. US 52)
- Hiawatha Street

East-West:

- 21st Avenue North
- University Avenue
- 4th, 3rd, 5th, Railway Avenue
- The Quentin N. Burdick Expressway (Bus. US 2/52)
- 11th Avenue South
- 20th Avenue South
- 32nd Avenue South

== Major divisions ==
The Souris River, also known as the "Mouse River", divides the city approximately in half, north and south. The valley rises to the plains both north and south of the river. Between the north and south hills is The Valley, the stretch of flat land until the city center, surrounding the Souris River, The northern rise and the plateau north of it are referred to as North Hill and the southern rise and plateau south of it are referred to as South Hill.

=== Commercial areas ===
Minot has several commercial areas, the first of which is Broadway (US Highway 83) itself, the main north–south trunk route.

Downtown Minot - generally refers to the area bounded by Broadway, 3rd Street East, Central Avenue, and Burdick Expressway, though the immediate vicinity is often also included.

Southwest Minot - There is a major shopping district along 16th Street SW south of the 2/52/83 bypass, including Dakota Square Mall, Wal-Mart, and various other shops.

The Arrowhead Mall is located at Central Avenue and 16th Street West. Oak Park Center is nearby, along 4th Avenue NW. There is also Town and Country Center, located at Broadway and 11th Avenue SW.

=== Neighborhoods ===
More specific named divisions tend to be upscale residential areas. These include Bel Air, which is the area north of 4th Avenue NW and west of 16th Street NW and includes Bel-Air Elementary School, Eastwood Park, which is southwest of Roosevelt Park and north of Burdick Expressway along 7th and 8th Streets SE, Terracita Vallejo which is actually outside of the city, west of the US 83 bypass but north of US 2/52, and Green Acres, which is off 16th St. SW near Dakota Square mall and other area shopping with a neighborhood park. Southwest Knolls is one of the more established wealthy neighborhoods of Minot, specifically 8th, 9th, and 10th Streets South, along South Hill.

Stonebridge Farms is located in the NE quadrant of the city, north of the airport. This is a more upscale suburban neighborhood along 36th Ave NE

Ridgedale Heights is located outside of Minot’s city limits, sits north of Stonebridge Farms it is a rural subdivision, it runs along 36th Ave NE and 13th St NE
