= Downtown Minot =

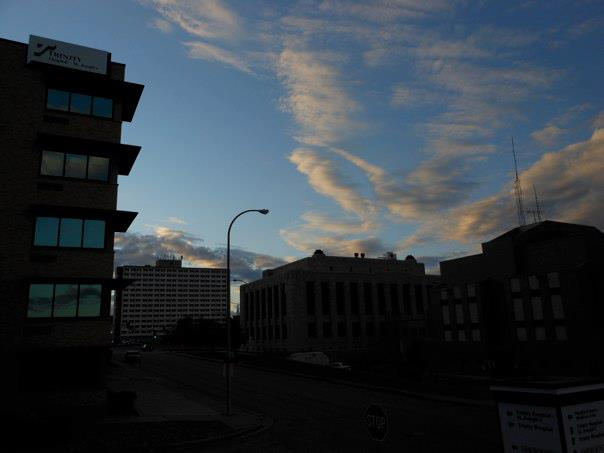
- Downtown Minot from Third Street NE
- Interactive map of Downtown Minot
- Coordinates: 48.235°N 101.293°W
- Country: United States
- State: North Dakota
- County: Ward County
- City: Minot
- Established: 1886
- Subdistricts of downtown: List: Commercial Historic District; East End/Bayou; Government Center; High Third; Lower Brooklyn

Government
  - Minot City Council: Larry Frey, David Lehner, Bob Miller, George Withus, Kevin Connole, Lisa Olson
  - State Assembly: Andrew G. Maragos (R), Roscoe Streyle (R), Scott Louser (R), Roger Braband (R)
  - State Senate: Randall A. Burckhard (R), Oley Larsen (R)
  - U.S. House: Kevin Cramer (R)

Area
  - Total: 0.24 sq mi (.62 km^{2})
- Highest elevation: 1,663 ft (507 m)
- Lowest elevation: 1,552 ft (473 m)
- ZIP Codes: 58701, 58703
- Area code: 701
- Website: downtownminot.com

Downtown Minot is the central business district of Minot, North Dakota, located south of the Souris River in the Souris Valley. Downtown is the site of the first permanent settlement in Minot in 1886. Downtown is home to many of Minot's cultural sites of interest. It is also home to numerous galleries, stores and restaurants. The Minot Riverwalk traverses the downtown.

== Geography ==
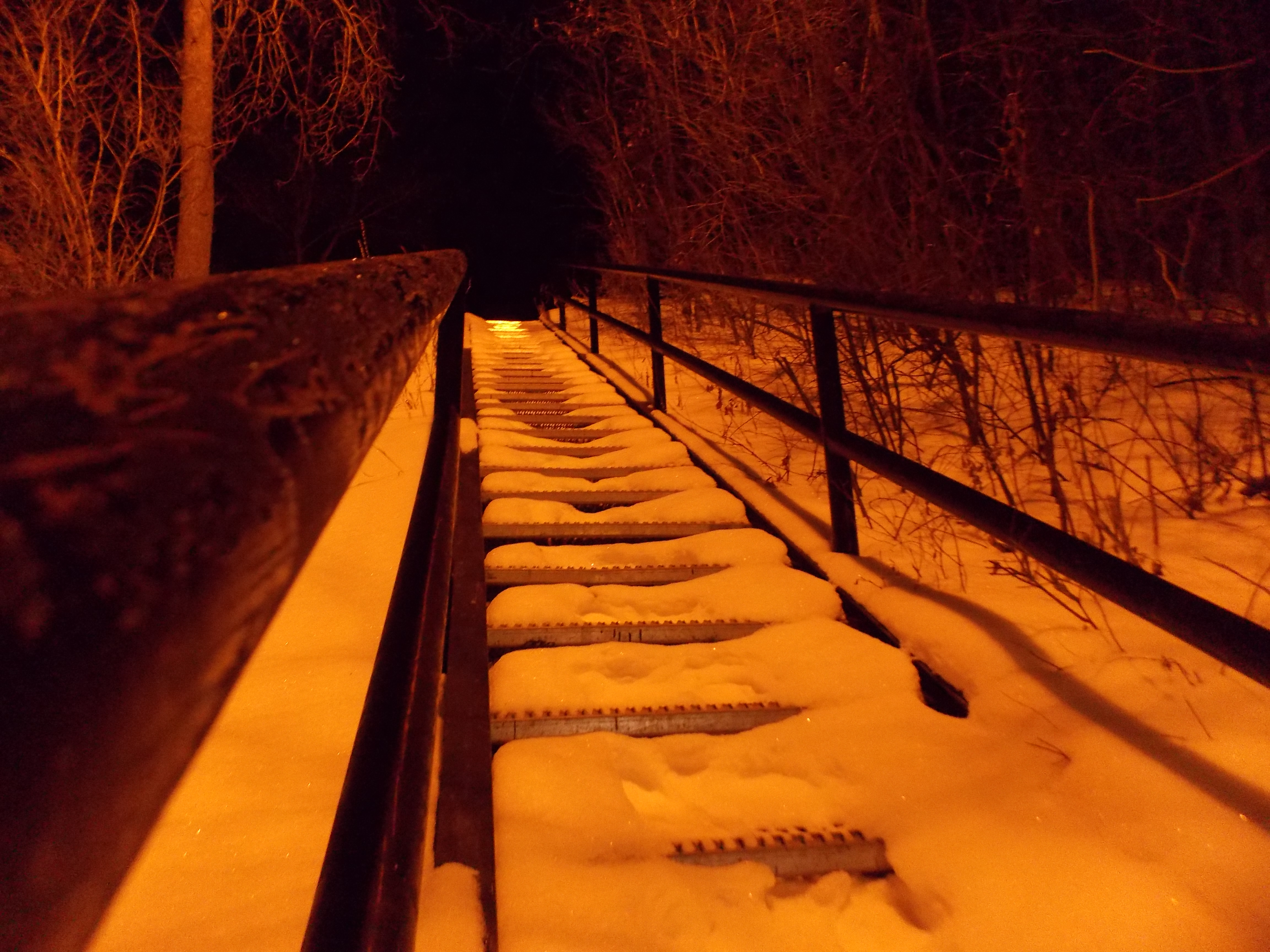
First Street Stairs to South Hill

Downtown Minot is located in the Souris River Valley between North Hill and South Hill along US Route 83. The neighborhood is roughly bound by Fifth Avenue South to the south, Fifth Street Southwest to the west, CP's railroad tracks to the north and Front Street to the east. The major streets through downtown include Broadway (formerly Second Street West), the Burdick Expressway (Business US 2/52), Main Street and Central Avenue. Main Street and Central Avenue divide the city's street into four quadrants. Streets east of Main Street are designated east, while streets west of Main Street are designated west. Likewise, streets north of Central Avenue are designated north, while those to the south are designated south. Downtown is connected to the north side of the Souris River by three bridges, the Broadway Bridge and the Third Street Bridge carry automobile traffic over the railroad track and river and the Anne Street Viaduct is a pedestrian bridge making this crossing. The Broadway Bridge, which carries US 83 across the river, was completed in 1962. The First Avenue Pedestrian Bridge over the Souris River, built in 1935, connects downtown with the Torbenson neighborhood. The Eastwood Park Bridge is a pedestrian bridge over the Eastwood Oxbow, which connects downtown with the Eastwood Park neighborhood. The Eastwood Park Bridge, a false arch bridge built in 1927, carries Sixth Street from Central Avenue to First Avenue SE. The First Street Stairs is a set of stairs connecting two sections of First Street and downtown with South Hill.

== History ==
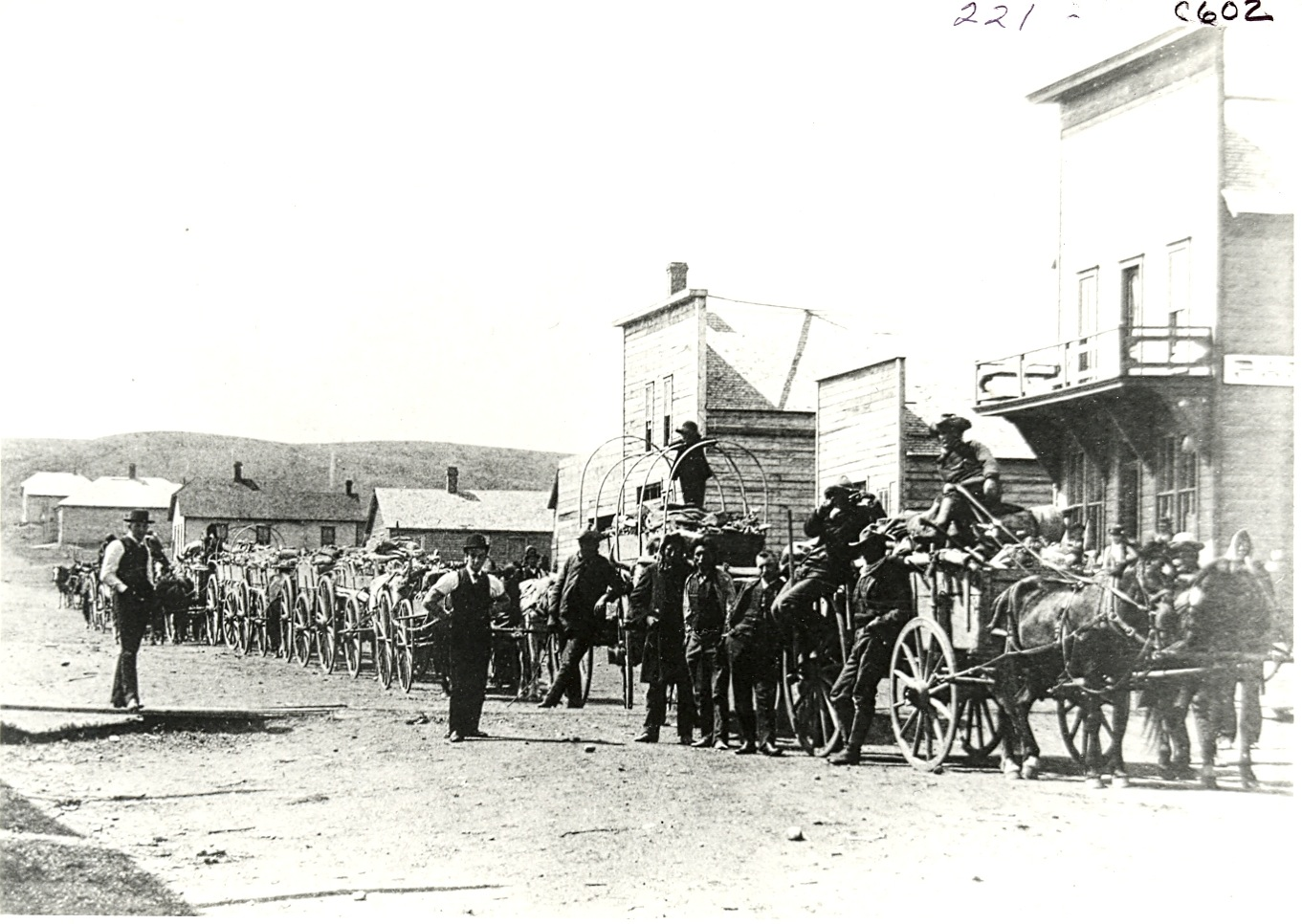
Photograph of Main Street in Minot in 1886. The Parker House is visible at the far right. Wagons of buffalo bones are also depicted.

In 1808, Alexander Henry The Younger identified the Assiniboine living along the Souris Valley as the Little Girl band. The Little Girl band or Souris River Assiniboine were the southernmost tribe of the Assiniboine The region they inhabited later became part of Rupert's Land, part of Hudson's Bay Company claim. This land did not become part of the United States until fifteen years after the Louisiana Purchase, at the London Convention. Minot was first settled in 1886, when the Great Northern Railway was extended to that location. Originally, a tent city sprung up where the trestle was being constructed across the Gassman Coulee. When it became known that the railroad had picked a townsite to the east, the tent city was relocated to what is now downtown Minot. At this time, the area was part of the Dakota Territory, whose capital had been transferred from Yankton in what is now South Dakota, to nearby Bismarck in 1883.

Olfa Olson, Ole Spokle, Ed Kettleson and Erik Ramstad were the first to settle in what is now Minot. Ramstad bought the tract which includes downtown. The area originally called the Second Crossing of the Mouse, later in 1886 was given the name Minot, after James J. Hill's friend, Henry Davis Minot, a fellow railroad executive and ornithologist. In 1886, people quickly began settling the downtown area. J.H. Charlesboise opened a blacksmith shop and Christ Lindberg opened a saloon. Allen Tompkins, who later became mayor of Minot, moved to the town and soon built the Minot's first hotel, which would later become the Parker House. Allen's son, Ernest Minot Tompkins, was the first child born in the new city. Construction of the railroad, farming and needed services provided early settlers with jobs. Another early way to make money was through the collection of buffalo bones from the area.

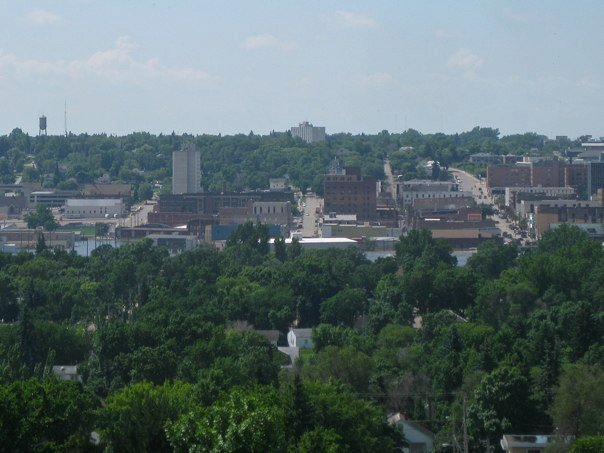
View of Downtown Minot from North Hill during the 2011 Flood

People collected buffalo bones from the surrounding area and brought them to the railroad track downtown. The bones were used for fertilizer and in the process of refining sugar. Piles of bones were stacked along the railway. In 1888, the pile along the railroad tracks extending east from Main Street was so large that the railroad built a spur track to load cars. Lignite mining was another earlier industry that was established around Minot.

On July 16, 1887, the village of Minot was incorporated and James H. Scofield became the first mayor. The second mayor of Minot, elected the following year, was the city's first physician, Dr. Edmund Belvea. Minot's population at this time was already around four hundred. By 1890, Minot's population was nearly thirteen hundred. Minot's early population growth earned it its nickname "The Magic City". By the 1910 census, Minot had outgrown Bismarck, to become the third largest city in the state. By 1970, however, Bismarck had regained that position. The Minneapolis, St. Paul and Sault Ste. Marie Railway, nicknamed the Soo Line for Sault Ste. Marie's pronunciation, was the second railroad to reach Minot, in 1893. The Soo Line Passenger Depot, built in 1912, served this line. In 1887, the city began publishing its first newspaper, the Minot Rustler Tribune. In the early 1920s, bank robbers, "Smiling" Johnny Reid and "Chicago Freddie" were living in Minot. Johnny Reid was one of several aliases used by Leslie Ayer, born in Prince Rupert, British Columbia in 1895. "Chicago Freddie", along with Arthur Schultz and George Long, were aliases of Arthur G. Davis, an American bank robber. Davis had just been released on parole, when he met Ayer in Minot in 1921. The pair stole more than $2 million from banks in Canada and the United States in the early 1920s.

In 2011, the Souris River flood inundated much of the river valley in Saskatchewan, North Dakota and Manitoba. In Minot, about a quarter of residents of the city were evacuated. On June 24, the Souris River surpassed previous crest heights This was considered a five-hundred year flood event. Hesco barriers were installed by the National Guard downtown before the flooding began. The secondary dikes and Hesco barriers helped to limit some of the flooding downtown. The flooding downtown was primarily in the northern section of the East End/Bayou section up to Central Avenue.

== Economy ==
=== Top employers ===
The top employers in Downtown Minot, according to the Minot Area Development Corporation in the first quarter of 2013 are:

#	Employer	# of Employees
1	Trinity Health	2,593
2	Minot Public Schools	1,545
3	City of Minot	323
4	Ward County	230
5	US Post Office	105
6	Minot Daily News	85 (2011)

== Neighborhoods ==
=== East End/Bayou ===
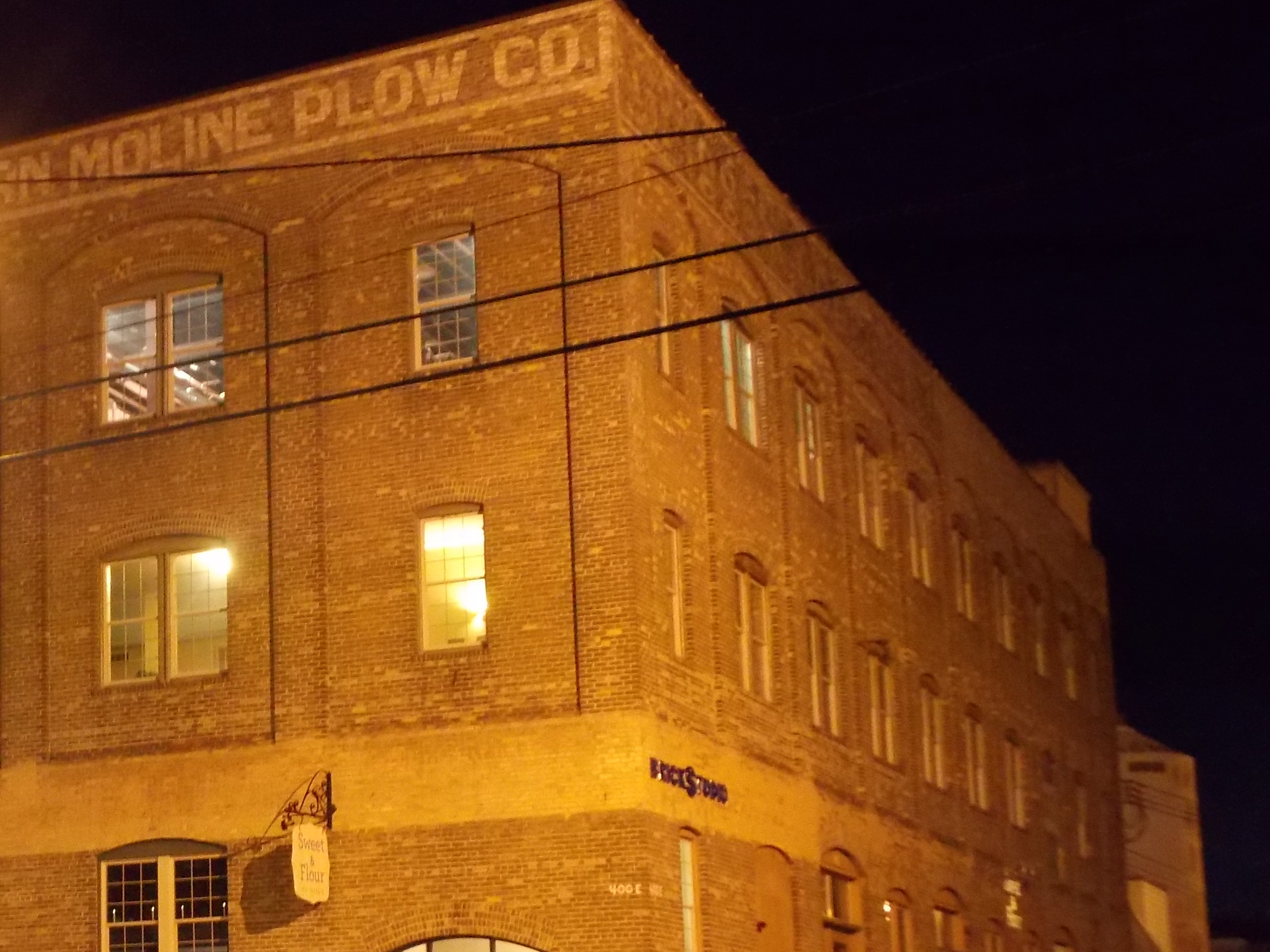
Bricks on Central Building

The East End/Bayou District is a neighborhood adjacent to the Commercial Historic District, not officially recognized as part of the Central Business District. It is situated within the Minot Industrial Historic District. The East End/Bayou neighborhood borders the Coney Island Addition to the north, the Woodland Addition and the river to the east, CP's railroad tracks to the south and the Commercial Historic District to the west. It is a mixed-use neighborhood, zoned mostly industrial and commercial. It has a similar building density to the rest of downtown. Central Avenue and Third Street East are the main thoroughfares through the neighborhood. The neighborhood is home to many businesses, including two bicycle shops, a flower shop and also the Railroad Museum. Bricks on Central, a three-story brick building, converted for office and commercial space, is home to a patisserie, a nursery, two photography studios, a dance studio, a fitness center and a software developer. The First Avenue Pedestrian Bridge connects the neighborhood with the Torbenson neighborhood on the north side of the river. The Sixth Street Pedestrian Bridge connects the neighborhood with Eastwood Park. The two neighborhoods are separated by the Eastwood Oxbow, for which the Bayou Addition received its name.

=== Government Center ===
Government Center is the small area formed from the triangle created by the Burdick Expressway, Third Street SE and Front Street. It is not considered part of the Central Business District. Government Center is home to the Ward County Courthouse, the county library and the county jail. It is the future location of the Ward County Office Building, a planned three-story, sandstone and glass office building across from the courthouse. The Minot Daily News building is also located in the neighborhood.

=== High Third ===
High Third was Minot's tenderloin or red-light district in the early twentieth century. It was located on a four block section of Third Street SW between what is now the Burdick Expressway and First Avenue SW, going up South Hill. The neighborhood remained the city's red-light district into the 1960s. The neighborhood was home to the Avalon, the Coffee Bar, the Flame Cafe, Saul's Barbecue, Famous Pit Bar-B-Cue, the Derrick Cafe and the Grill. Dale Brown, Louisiana State University coach, used to eat at the Grill. Saul's Barbecue was operated by Negro leagues player, Saul Davis. In the 1940s, Davis's team came to Minot to play a game at Corbett Field. Davis remained in Minot, where he decided to open a barbecue at 318 Third Street SW. High Third was known for the presence of gambling, prostitution and alcohol during Prohibition. During Prohibition, the illegal activities associated with the High Third neighborhood helped earn Minot the nickname Little Chicago. In a 1983 Minot Daily News article, the author called the neighborhood a "haven of brothels and bootlegging". After police raids in the Third Street neighborhood in 1954, the city received phone calls warning them to "lay off Third Street or else". In 1979, the North Dakota State Highway Department widened Broadway, which necessitated the demolition of numerous buildings in the neighborhood.

=== Lower Brooklyn ===
The lower part of the Brooklyn neighborhood is included in Minot's Central Business District. Brooklyn, named for the Brooklyn Addition, is bounded by Sixth Street SW, Eleventh Avenue SW, Broadway and the Burdick Expressway. Lower Brooklyn is the northeast section of the neighborhood bounded by a line continued from Fourth Street SW and Eighth Avenue SW. Upper Brooklyn or Brooklyn Heights is the southwestern portions of the neighborhood on South Hill and is not considered part of downtown. The Brooklyn Heights Apartments are named after the neighborhood. Upper Brooklyn is also home the Scandinavian Heritage Park. Lower Brooklyn is home to a few businesses, residences and a car dealership.

== Cityscape ==
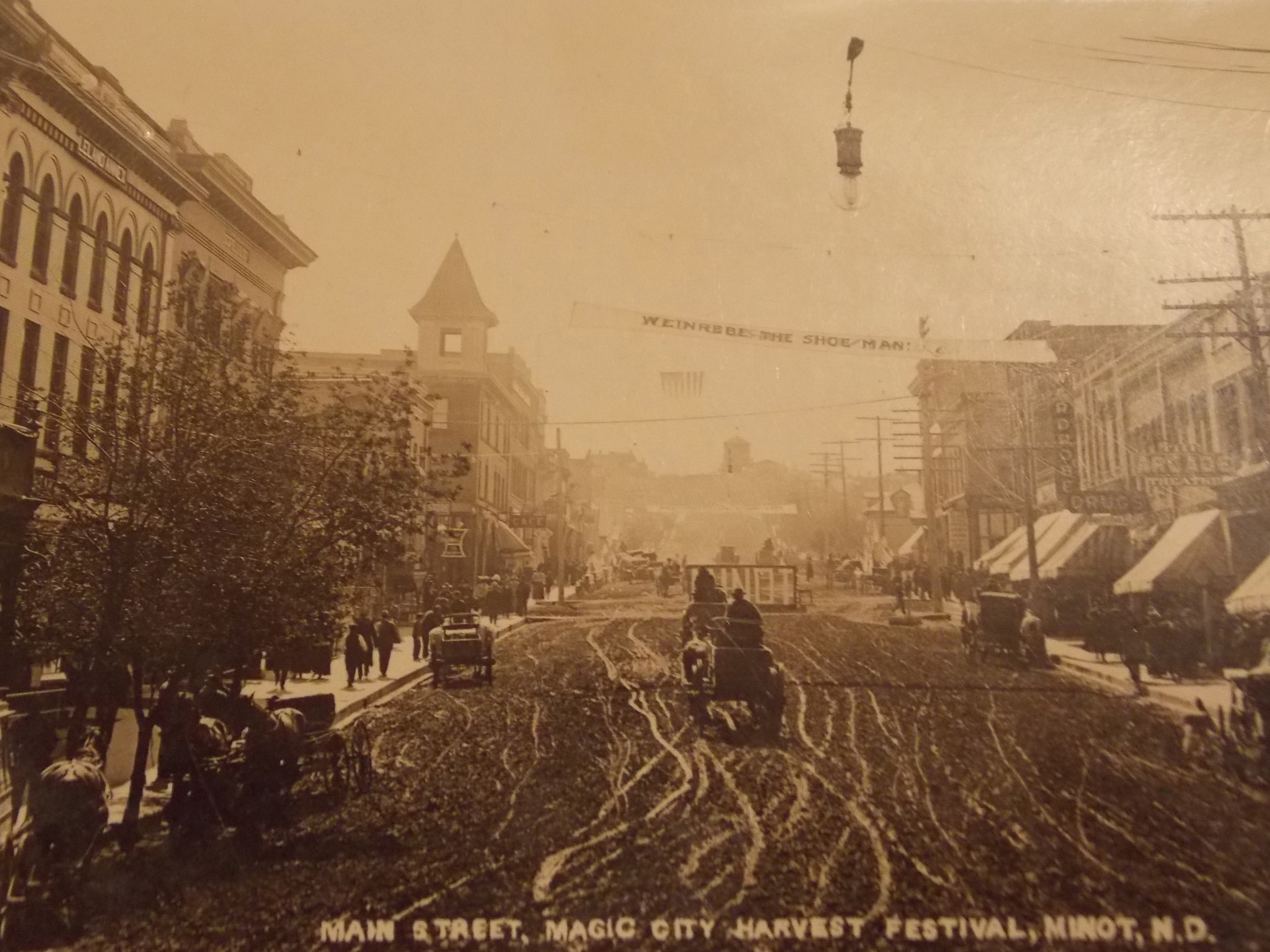
Postcard looking south on Main Street in 1909

The Blakey Block is located at 107 Main Street. The building was designed by Robert Stacy-Judd, who lived in Minot and operated a firm in town from 1917 to 1919. The Blakey Block was formerly home of A.S. Blakey Drugs. In the first half of the twentieth century, it was also home to the short-lived Minot College of Commerce, which was located on the second floor. Today, the building is home to a jewelry store. It is pictured in the postcard above, just past the Cafe sign on the left hand side of the road.

Bricks on Central is a three-story brick building in the Bayou section, which has been converted for commercial use.

The Carnegie Library is located on 2nd Avenue SE and was built in 1911. The Classical Revival style building served as the city's library from 1912 until 1965. The building now called the Carnegie Center is used for special events.

The Fair is the second location of the Ellison brothers Fair department store. Engel, Norman and Otto Ellison opened the new location in 1910. In 1929, a second building, just south of the Fair Block was opened at the corner of Second Avenue and Main Street. The building at the corner of Second Avenue and Main Street was intended to be five stories, four stories for the store and the top stories for offices. The building, however, was only built as a three-story structure. Today the building is home to offices, restaurants and stores. The upper floors are home to apartment and condominiums.

The First Avenue Building at 13 First Avenue SW is a five-story building between West Alley and First Street SW. The building was completed in 1928 and is concrete with an applied masonry facade. The building used to face Minot's first city hall built in 1905. That building was later razed to build a parking lot. The site is expected to become the location of a public parking garage in 2013.

Fountain Plaza located at the Southwest Corner of First Avenue and Main Street. It is named for the fountain, originally located in the middle of Main Street, which has since been moved to this location. The Lyceum Theater operated at this site, in an earlier building, in the early twentieth century. In the 1920s, the theater was renamed the Strand Theater and in 1955 it became the Town Theater. The theater building was torn down in the 1960s.

The Lee Block or Evergreen Square is the building on the southwest corner of Main Street and Central Avenue. It is named for Peter P. Lee, the fourth mayor of Minot. This location was home to Jack Doyle's saloon, Lee's general store and later the New York Store, which became a Woolworths. Today, the building is home to apartments.

The Minot Building, also known as the Midwest Federal Building, is located on Second Avenue SW between 1st Street and West Alley. The building formerly served as the Minot Federal Savings and Loans headquarters. The dark eight-story building and the large letter M, make the building a landmark in downtown.

The Minot Public Library, located on Second Avenue SW, has served as the public library for the city, since the building was dedicated in 1966.

The Parker Suites at 19 First Avenue SE were built between 1929 and 1943. George Vaulker commissioned the project as an office building, but only the bottom two floors were finished for many years. As historical pictures show, the supports for the upper floors were built, but the building remained unfinished. Clarance Parker bought and finished construction of the building turning it into a hotel. President Eisenhower stayed at the hotel in 1953, while visiting the recently completed Garrison Dam.

The Scofield Block is the building on the east side of Main Street, just south of Artspace Lofts. The building is named for James H. Scofield, the first mayor of Minot, who was the head of Scofield Implement. The building was built in 1905.

The Soo Line Passenger Depot is an old railroad station built in 1912 at the northern end of Main Street. The depot, no longer located on a line which offers passenger service, has since been converted to the Old Soo Depot Transportation Museum.

The Tompkins Block is located between 10 North Main and the Taube Art Museum on the east side of North Main Street. The two-story building is named after the former mayor of Minot, Allan Tompkins. The building is home to apartments and several businesses.

== Attractions ==
=== Arts and culture ===
- Arlene Theater, a theater hosting performances by a community theater group called the Mouse River Players is located on First Avenue SE.
- Minot Public Library, the city's public library located on the west end of downtown on Second Avenue SW.
- Taube Museum of Art, an art museum which first opened in 1970, is located in the Union National Bank Building on North Main Street.
- Old Soo Transportation Museum, located in the old Soo Line Depot, built in 1912, has items related to Minot's railroad history.
- Railroad Museum of Minot, a museum displaying artifacts from Minot's railroad history, is located on First Ave NE
- 62 Doors Gallery and Studios, is an art gallery and studio space so named for the walls in the studios constructed from salvaged doors
- Margie's Art Glass Studio, is a studio space and gift shop, selling art glass supplies and handmade glasswork.
- Pangea House, a community center with a focus on music and art, which also hosts Why Not Fest, an annual music and arts festival.
- Ward County Library, a small library in Government Center open on weekdays only.

=== Sports venues ===
The Minot Municipal Auditorium is a 5,000-seat multi-purpose venue at the western edge of downtown. Despite having a larger seating capacity than All Seasons Arena, two miles to the east or Maysa Arena, two miles to the southwest, the Municipal Auditorium has no current tenants. The Minot Minotauros of the North American Hockey League play their games at Maysa Arena. The MSU Beavers hockey team plays their games at All Seasons Arena. The Minot SkyRockets, a former Continental Basketball Association team played their games at the Municipal Auditorium. The Auditorium has recently served as a venue for concerts. In the fall of 2011, students at Ramstad Middle School began attending classes at the Minot Municipal Auditorium downtown. Temporary classroom units on the property were also needed to accommodate students. A new Ramstad Middle School is currently being constructed on North Hill, which is expected to open for the 2013-2014 school year.

=== Places of worship ===
Baptist

First Baptist Church

Baptist

Heritage Baptist Church

Catholic

St. Leo's Catholic Church

Christian Science

First Church-Christ Scientist

Episcopal

All Saints' Episcopal Church

Grace Communion International

Grace Communion International meets at the Central High School Campus

Lutheran

Bethany Lutheran Church

Lutheran

St. Paul's Lutheran Church

== Tallest buildings ==
There is currently a maximum height limit of one hundred and fifty feet for the Central Business District. There is no height limitation for most of the East End/Bayou neighborhood.

Rank	Building	Height	Floors	Year completed/projected	Status
1st	Milton Young Towers	151.93 ft (46 m)	14	1972	Completed
2nd	The Minot Building	112.62 ft ft (34 m)	8	1962	Completed
3rd	The Parker Suites	97.66 ft ft (30 m)	9	1946	Completed

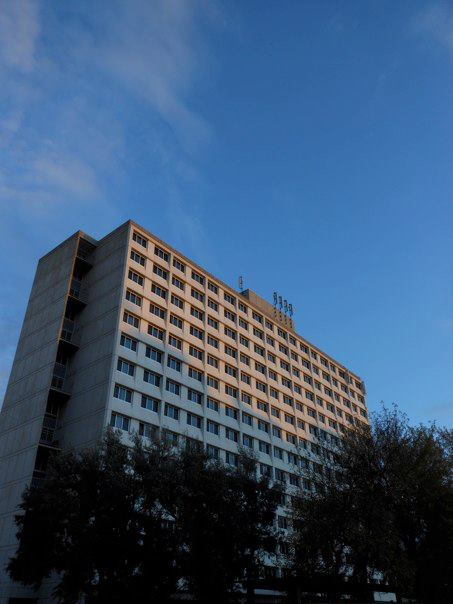
Milton Young Towers

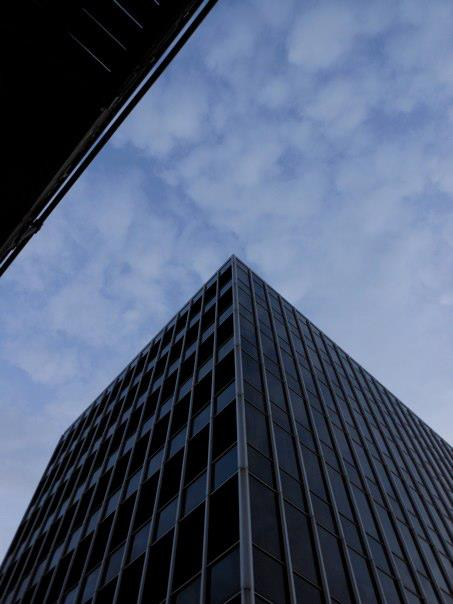
The Minot Building

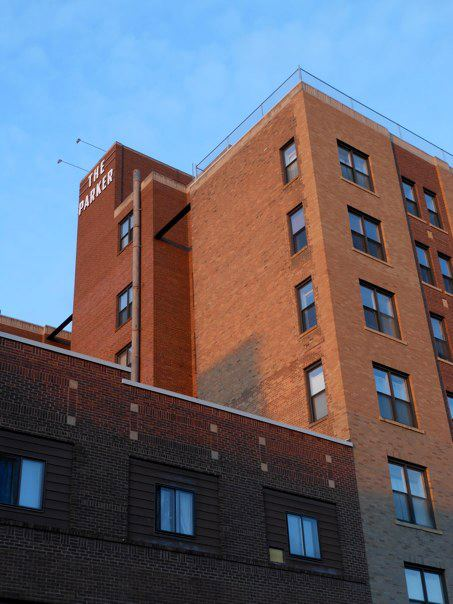
Parker Suites

== Demographics ==
Approximately 65% of the residents of downtown Minot were born in North Dakota. 28.4% of the population was born in other US states and 6.6% of the population was born outside of the United States.

== Government Facilities ==
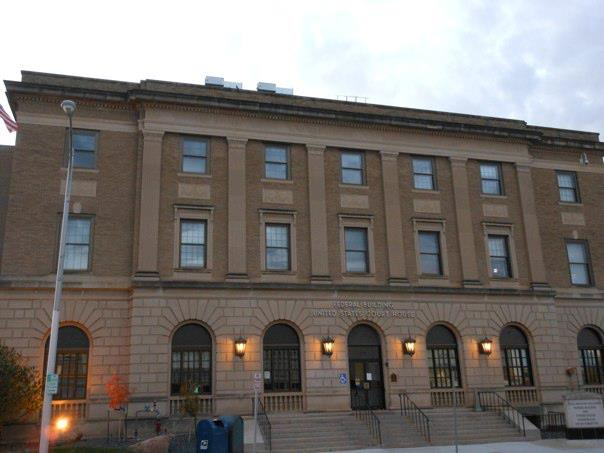
Van Sickle Federal Building

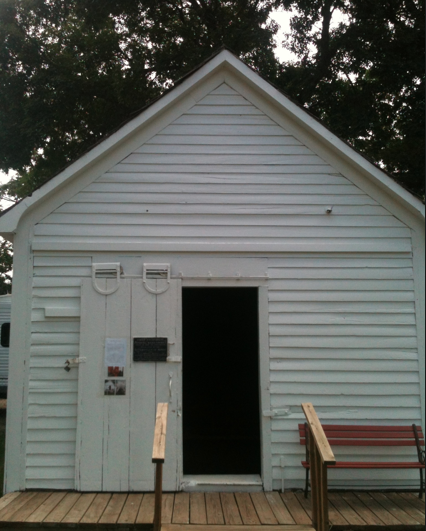
The first Ward County Courthouse

Government Center, the triangle formed from the Burdick Expressway, Third Street SE and Front Street is home to a number of Ward County facilities. This area is home to the county courthouse, the county jail and the county library. The Minot Public Library is located on the western edge of the downtown neighborhood, on the corner of Second Ave SW and Sixth Street SW. The former public library, the Minot Carnegie Library is located on Second Avenue SE. The former library, now called the Carnegie Center, hosts numerous special events throughout the year. There are also current plans to construct a county office building in the neighborhood. The neighborhood is also home to the Minot Daily News, the primary print newspaper for the northwestern part of the state. The first Ward County Courthouse was located in Burlington. It was built in 1886 and at that time the county was called Imperial Ward County and included parts of Burke, Mountrail and Renville counties. This building is now located at the North Dakota State Fairgrounds in Minot. The building sustained some minor damage from the Souris River flood in 2011. In 1889, a new county courthouse was built at the present site on Third Street. The brick building was raised in 1928, so a new courthouse could be constructed on the site. In 1929, the current Art Deco Ward County Courthouse, designed by the architectural firm Toltz, King & Day, was constructed on the same site. The county jail is situated just to the east of the courthouse. The planned county office building would be constructed, just to the north of the courthouse on the other side of Third Avenue.

The Judge Bruce M. Van Sickle Federal Building and U.S. Courthouse is an Italian Renaissance Revival style building located on First Street SW in downtown. Bruce Marion Van Sickle was a Minotian and United States federal judge appointed by Richard Nixon in 1971. The building was built in 1915 and designed by Oscar Wenderoth. The building originally housed the post office for Minot. In 1940, a significant addition was constructed. In 1962, the post office was moved out of the building and out of downtown. The area that served as the post office was converted to office space. In 1982, the courtroom in the building was remodeled.

Minot's first city hall was located on First Avenue Southwest on West Alley between First Street SW and Main Street. The two-story brick building remained in use as Minot City Hall for fifty years. Today, Minot City Hall is located in a complex with the police station on Second Avenue across from the city library.

== Education ==
The University of North Dakota's School of Medicine and Health Sciences has a Northwest Campus located downtown. The campus is host to a small number of medical students and family medicine residents at Trinity Hospital. The campus is also home to the Angus L. Cameron Medical Library. The library is open on weekdays and provides resources and services to medical staff at Trinity and to students. Limited resources and services are also available to the general public.

Downtown is also home to Minot High School's Central Campus and Central Campus East. Central Campus East is an alternative campus for students under 16. The Central Campus is the high school in Minot for ninth and tenth graders. It is located in the expanded former Minot High School building, which was constructed in 1918. In 1974, a new high school was opened in Minot, west of downtown. That campus has since become the Magic City Campus and was for eleventh and twelfth graders. Upon completion of the new Minot North High school (opened in August 2024), Magic City became a full four-year high school, and Central was converted into the city's fourth middle school.

The former Minot Armory building is now home to the Minot School District offices. In 1913, the armory housed Minot State Normal School's first library.

== Transportation ==
Map of Downtown Minot

The main roads accessing downtown are the Burdick Expressway and Broadway. The Burdick Expressway is a four lane road, which carries Business US 52 and Business US 2 through downtown. Broadway carries US 83 through downtown. The Minot Bypass, a loop composed of alternate routes for all three roads travels around the city. The southern segment of the bypass is a four-lane limited-access highway, while the Western Bypass is a two-lane limited-access highway. A recently constructed Northeast Bypass carries traffic from US 2 on the east side of town to US 83 north.

Downtown in one and a half miles from Minot International Airport, the second busiest airport in the state, behind Hector International Airport in Fargo. In 2012, the airport had over 224,000 boardings, a record number, which was a sixty-six percent increase from 2011. The airport is served by Allegiant, Delta, Frontier and United, which fly to Denver, Las Vegas, Minneapolis and Phoenix. In 2010, when service was offered to Denver, an additional route to Salt Lake City was begun. This route was cancelled due to low ridership. Similarly in the 1960s and the 1980s, a connection with Regina was briefly offered at Minot Airport. More recently United offered service to Houston, which has since been cancelled. With the surge in number of travelers at the airport in recent years, however, new destinations are now being considered. The airport is currently in the planning stages of a construction project for a new terminal and airport expansion project.

=== Amtrak ===
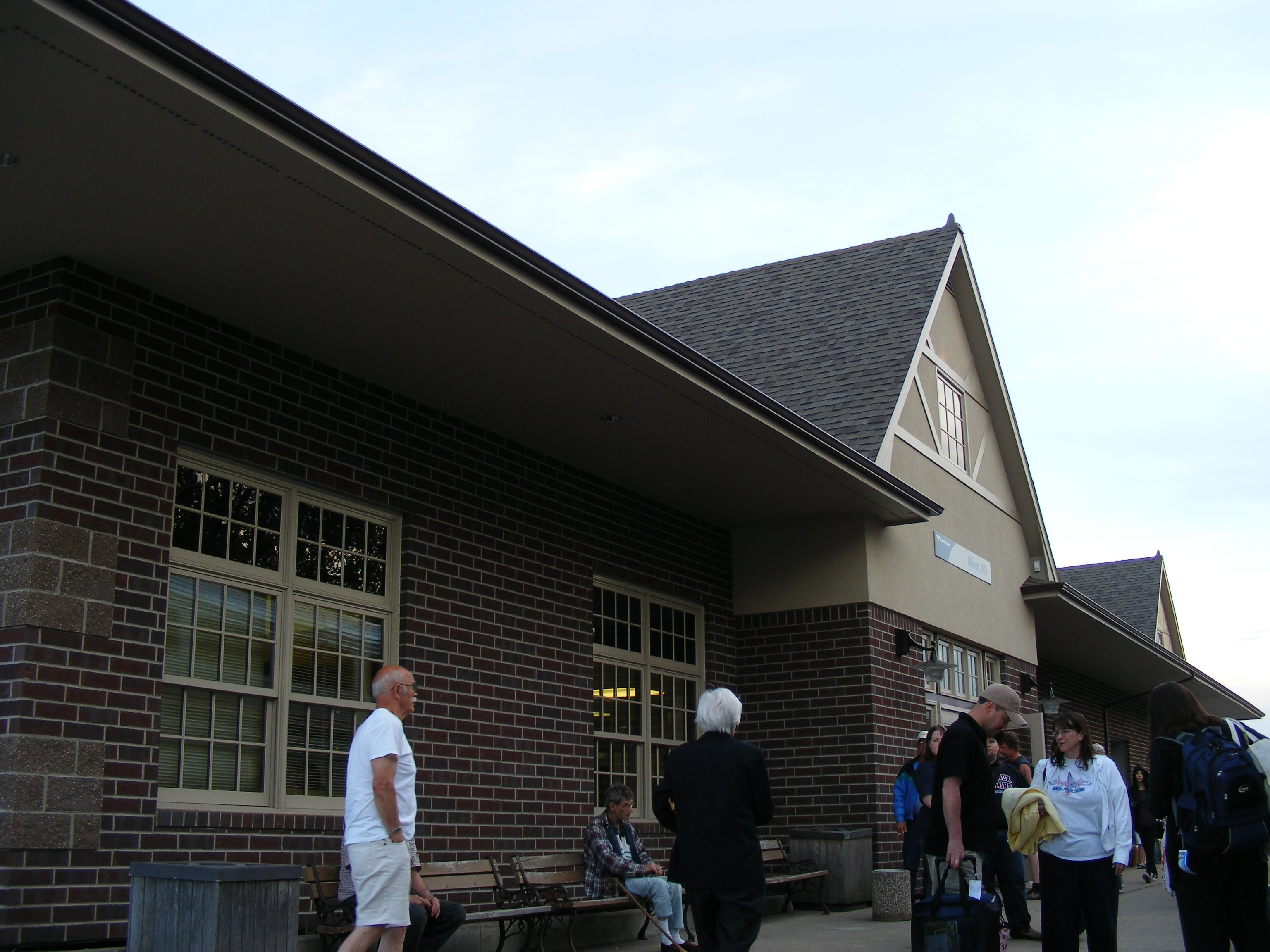
Minot Amtrak station

Although the Soo Line Depot downtown is no longer used as a passenger station, Amtrak's Minot Station is located on the northwest edge of downtown, accessible from First Avenue SW. The station is on Amtrak's Empire Builder line, which connect's Chicago with Seattle and Portland. The station was the second busiest in the state in 2012, over Fargo, Grand Forks, Devils Lake, Rugby and Stanley. Only Williston had more boardings than Minot. Of the forty-six stations on the Empire Builder route, Minot was the twelfth busiest in 2012 behind Chicago Union Station, King Street Station in Seattle, Union Station in Portland, Milwaukee Intermodal Station, Midway Station in St. Paul, Vancouver Station in Washington, Glenview Station in Illinois, Whitefish Station in Montana, Spokane Intermodal Center, Williston Station and Everett Station in Washington. Minot is a layover stop as the city marks the start of a new subdivision. This is where train crews change to Mountain Time Zone, although the tracks do not cross into the Mountain Time Zone until the Montana border.

=== Local Service ===
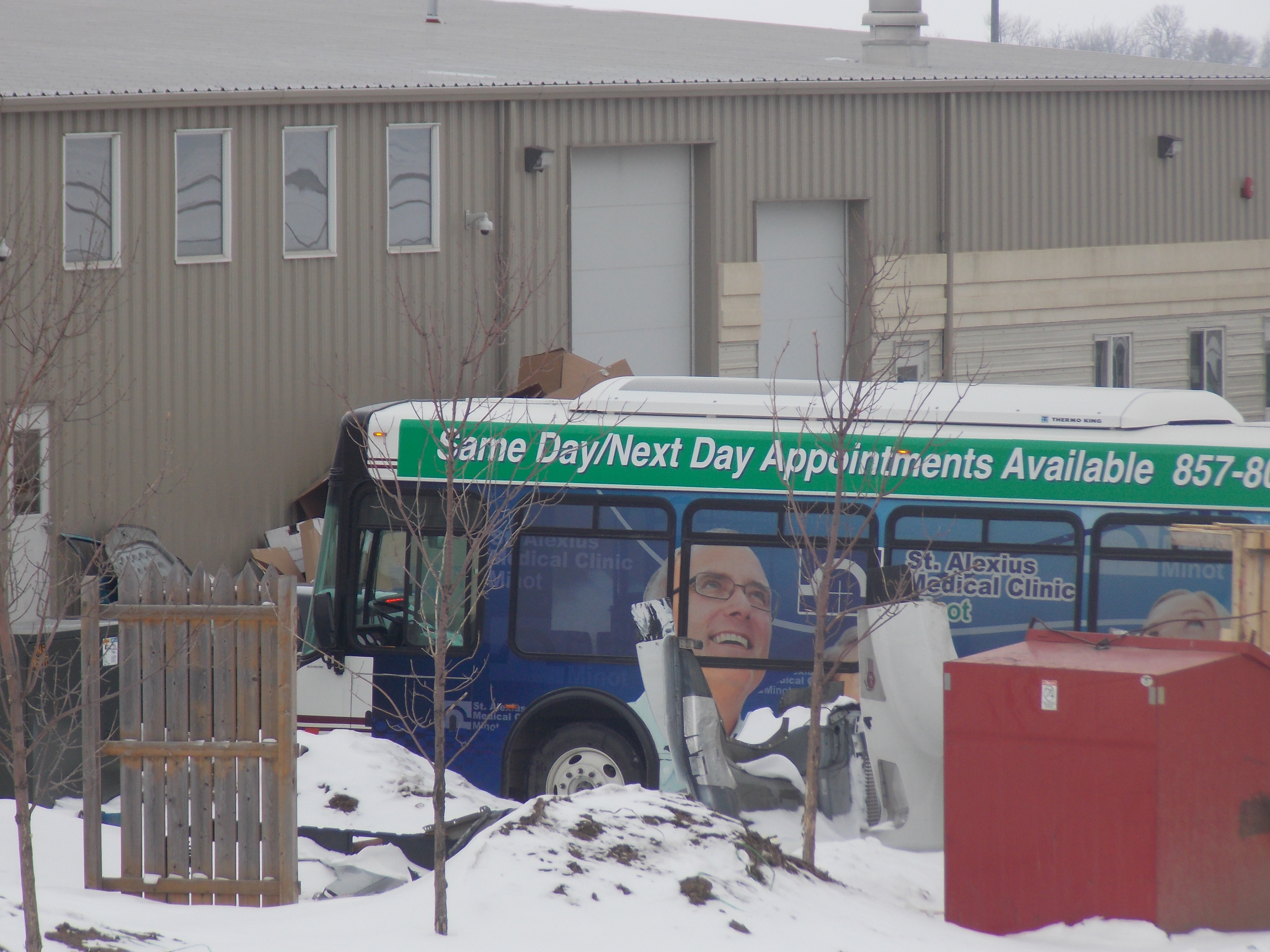
Minot city bus

Minot City Transit operates several bus routes, which serve downtown on weekdays. Cash fare or tokens can be purchased upon boarding the bus. In the mornings, bus routes from downtown service Minot State University and West Minot on the North Central Route, Minot State University and North Hill from the North Route, Eastwood Park and Holiday Village from the East Route, South Hill and the Dakota Square Mall form the South #2 Route and Oak Park and Bel Air from the West Route. In the afternoon, North Hill can be accessed from the North Route, Roosevelt Park and Holiday Village from the East Route, South Hill from the South Route #1 and Minot State University and Oak Park from the West Route. The City of Minot is currently conducting a transit study to determine the transit service needs of the city and the region over the next five to ten years.

On January 8, 1912, former Minot mayor, Joseph Roach and James Johnson, A.J. Brunner and L.J. Palda, met with the city commission to propose an electric street railway. The trolley would have begun at the old Soo Line Depot, travelled up Main Street to what is now the Burdick Expressway toward Eastwood Park and return to downtown via Central Avenue. The proposal was turned down by the city. The reason cited was that the plan did not cover the outlying districts of Minot.

=== Regional Service ===
Souris Basin Transportation offers service from Minot to Crosby, Kenmare, the Minot Air Force Base and Sawyer. The Dakota Shuttle offers daily service to Stanley, Tioga and Williston. The pickup location can be reached from downtown via city cab or the North bus line. There is a bus from Minot to Bismarck that leaves at 1:00 PM on every day except Thursday and Saturday, which returns at 4:30 PM. The bus stops at Washburn at 2:15 PM on the way to Bismarck and at 5:25 PM on the way to Minot.

== Future development ==
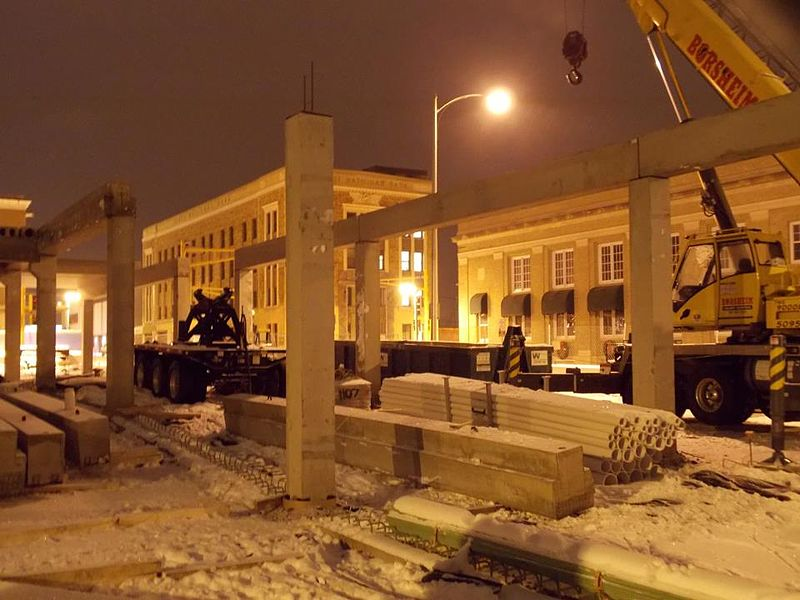
ArtSpace Lofts in Minot under construction in December 2012

The downtown neighborhood was part of a redevelopment project. The $140 million Imagine Downtown project helped restore the downtown district in response to the 2011 Flood. The project provided low to moderate income housing in the downtown and improved infrastructure, which included new streets, sidewalks, water mains and traffic lights. Two three-level, city-owned parking garages have also been built downtown, which were financed through the MAGIC Fund. One parking structure is located on the southeast corner of Second Avenue SW and First Street SW, while the other is located on the northeast corner of First Avenue SW and First Street SW.

The Artspace Minot Lofts, a new addition to Main Street, is a four-story 34-unit residential building on the site of the former Leland Parker Hotel. The building was the first building constructed downtown in thirty years. In addition to the residential space, commercial arts-related space is available. One tenant of this space is a Native American museum and gift shop.

A new Ward County Office Building downtown was designed by JLG Architects The project included the expansion of the Ward County Jail. The new office building matches the look of the Ward County Courthouse, but has a glass entryway. The architect explained that the current design allows for future vertical expansion.

== Events ==
Downtown Minot host numerous events throughout the year, which include:

- Hot Summer Nights Wine Walk in June
- Festival on Main, held in August
- Why Not?!? Minot Music and Arts Festival (formerly "Why Not Fest"), held in August
- The Wine Walk, held in September
- The Souris Valley Garlic and Grape Festival, held in September
- Artfest, held in October
- Worldwide Photo Walk, held in October
- Tree Lighting Ceremony, held in November
- Small Business Saturday, held the day after Black Friday
- Christmas Open House, held in November

== Emergency Services ==
=== Hospitals ===
Trinity Hospital is located along the Burdick Expressway in downtown.

Trinity Hospital is no longer located along Burdick expressway downtown. Location has moved to 2305 37th ave SW, Minot ND 58701

=== Fire services ===
The Minot Fire Department operates Fire Station #2 in Downtown

=== Police services ===
The Minot Police Department operates just outside the Central Business District at 515 Second Ave SW.

== Gallery ==
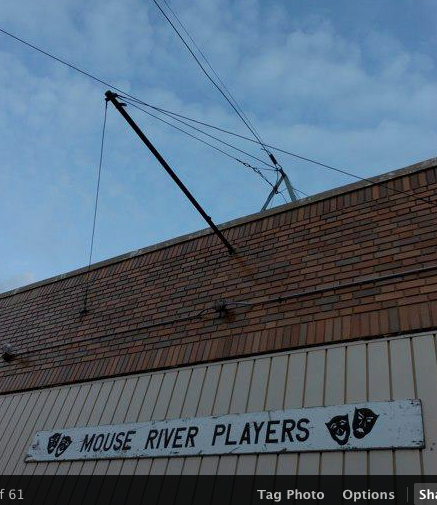
Arlene Theater

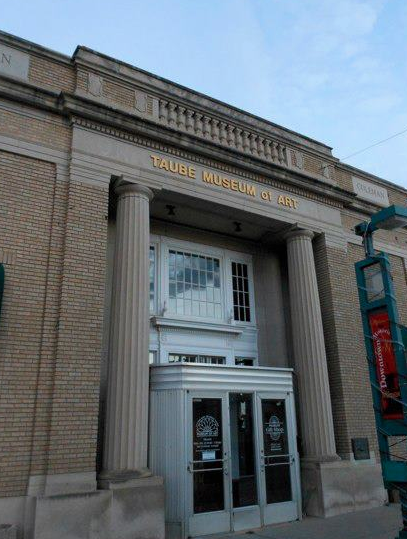
Taube Museum of Art

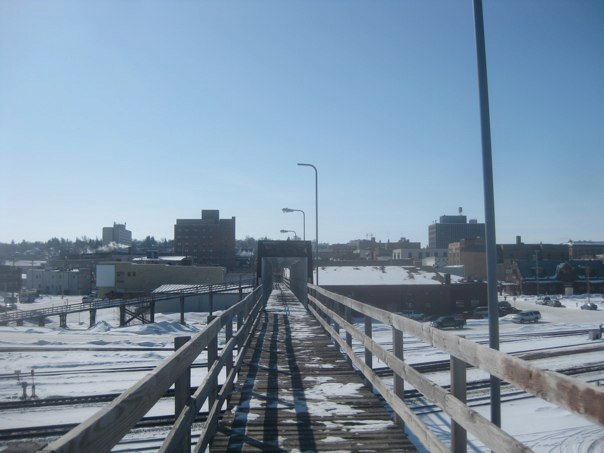
Anne Street Bridge

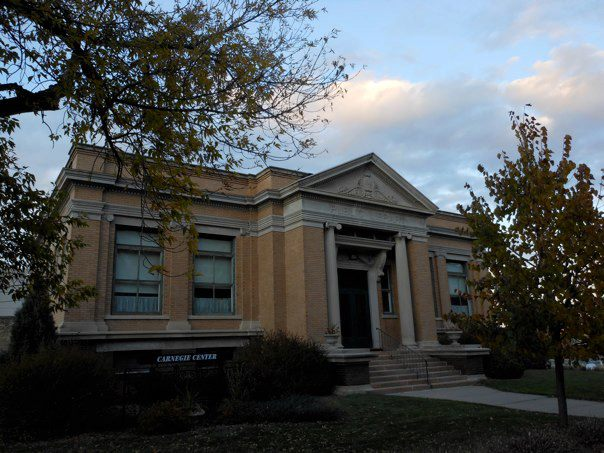
Carnegie Center

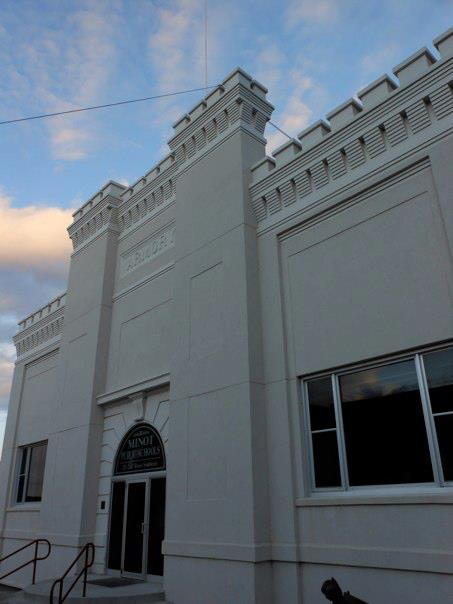
Armory
