= Taube Museum of Art =

Museum in Minot, North Dakota

Coordinates: 48.2366°N 101.2928°W

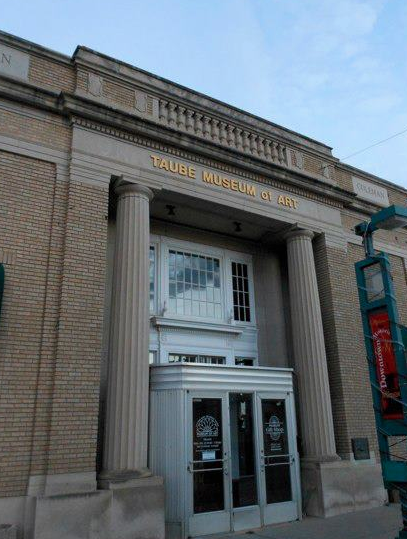
- Established: 1970
- Location: 2 N. Main Street; Minot, North Dakota, U.S.
- Director: Rachel Alfaro
- Public transit access: Minot City Transit; Minot station
- Website: www.taubemuseum.org

The Taube Museum of Art is an art museum in Downtown Minot, North Dakota. The museum, previously known as the Minot Art Gallery, was named after Lillian and Coleman Taube.

The organization was formed in 1970 and was initially located at the Linha home on US 83. It later moved to the Ward County Historical Society at the North Dakota State Fairgrounds. In 1977, the group purchased the Union National Bank Building at 2 North Main Street. The building was constructed in 1923 after a fire gutted the former building at that location. The bank operated at this location until 1963, when a new bank was built at the southeast corner of First Ave SW and First Street SW.

The museum currently has two galleries, their main gallery and a lower gallery. The museum has a gift shop, which sells painting and other artwork created by local and regional artists. The museum is open from Tuesday through Friday 10:30 AM to 5:30 PM. On September 25, 2012, a groundbreaking ceremony was held for Minot Artspace Lofts, which are being constructed across from the Taube Art Museum.
