= Arlene Theater =

Performance theater in Downtown Minot, North Dakota, U.S.

Coordinates: 48°14′05″N 101°17′28″W

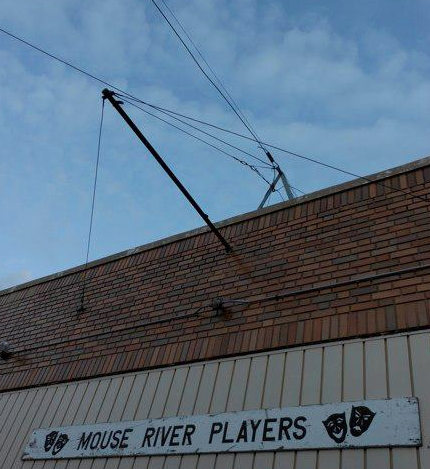
- Interactive map of Arlene Theater
- Address: Minot, North Dakota; USA
- Operator: Mouse River Players
- Capacity: 200
- Public transit: Minot City Transit

Construction
- Opened: 2004

Website
- http://www.mouseriverplayers.org/

The Arlene Theater is the name of a performance theater in Downtown Minot, North Dakota.

The theater is located on First Street Southeast in Downtown Minot. The building was originally built and dedicated as the Minot Labor Temple. The Mouse River Players theater group purchased the building in 2004. It was first called the Mouse River Players Community Arts Center, but renamed after Arlene L. Saugstad (1912-2014) in 2006. Saugstad was instrumental in the organization of the Mouse River Players in 1971. In 2009, the theater installed stadium seating to accommodate two hundred audience members.

== Mouse River Players ==
Mouse River Players is an all-volunteer community theatre organization. Mouse River Players began in 1971 to providing live, quality theatre performances.

== Mini Mousers ==
The Arlene Theater has a children's theater program called the Mini Mousers. The program offers students between the ages of six and fourteen classes taught by local artists. Students in the program perform in the Mouse River Players annual family production
