= Minot Public Library =

Public library in Minot, North Dakota

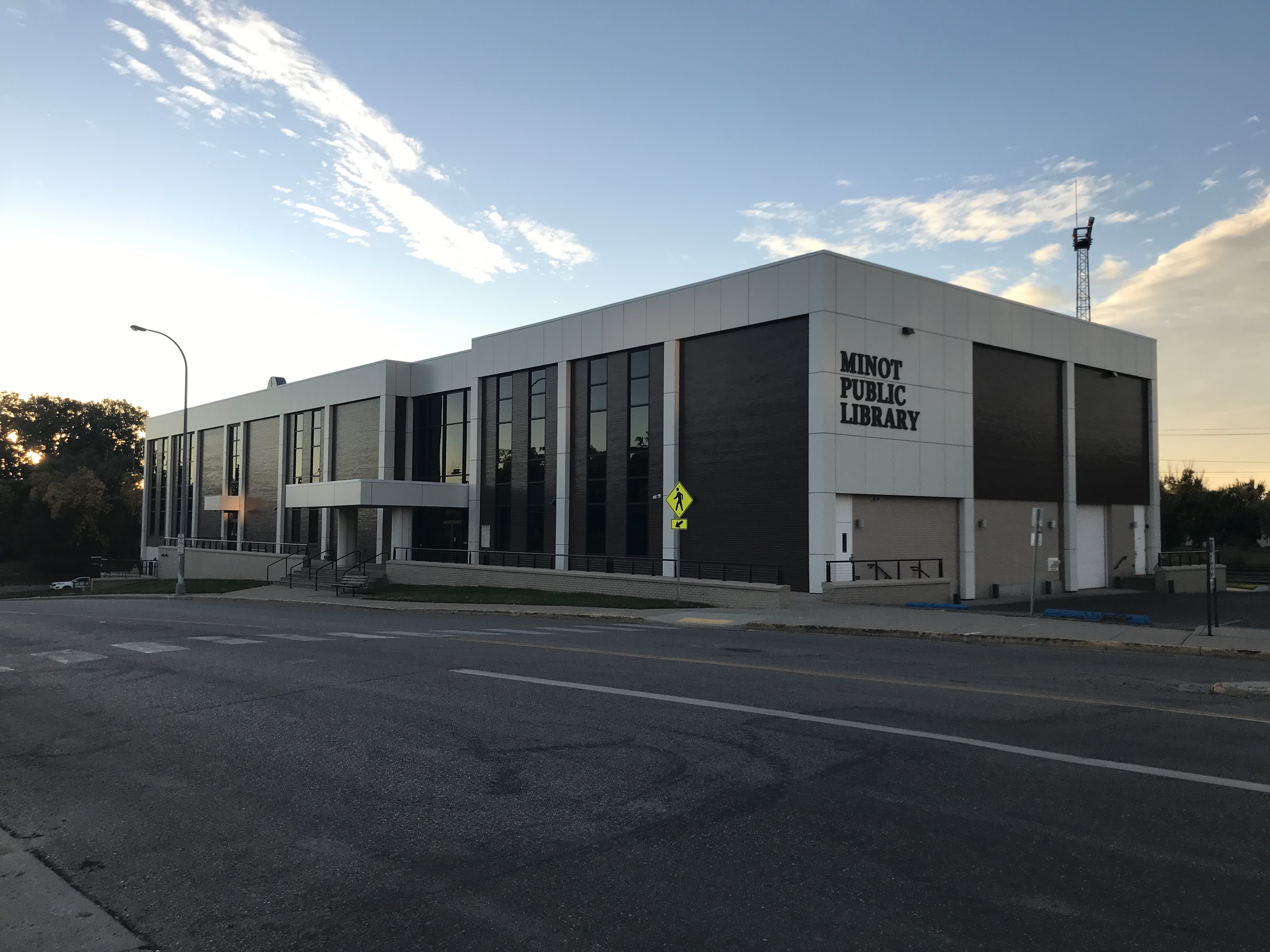
- 48.234482°N 101.301101°W
- Location: Minot, North Dakota, USA
- Type: Public
- Established: 1908

Collection
- Size: 134,416

Access and use
- Circulation: 301,721
- Population served: 42,485

Other information
- Director: Janet Anderson
- Public transit access: Minot City Transit
- Website: Minot Public Library

The Minot Public Library is a public library in Minot, North Dakota, at the western edge of Downtown Minot.

== History ==
The Minot Public Library was established in 1908 with Clara Kunst serving as the first librarian. Within the first year the library had over thirteen hundred books in its collection. The library was originally in two rooms of the Optic Block on Main Street. On March 29, 1909, a fire broke out in the work room of the Optic Block. The fire caused considerable damage in the building, estimated at the time at $2,500. In 1910, the library received a grant from Andrew Carnegie for a new library building. The Minot Carnegie Library was built on the corner of Second Avenue SE and First Street SE by Carl Peter Bartleson, who also built the Mountrail County Courthouse. The new library was dedicated on February 19, 1912. The librarian Margaret Greene reported that 221 books were checked out on that day. On November 1, 1913, the North Dakota Library Association held a meeting at the new public library in Minot, which Governor L.B. Hanna and future governor Ragnvald A. Nestos attended. Nestos was the President of the North Dakota Library Association at the time. The new library on Second Avenue SW was dedicated on December 3, 1966. The library hosts monthly educational and cultural displays.
