= George Floyd protests in North Dakota =

Civil unrest in 2020 following the murder of George Floyd

- Part of George Floyd protests
- Date: May 30 – June 7, 2020 (1 week and 1 day)
- Location: North Dakota, United States
- Caused by: Police brutality; Institutional racism against African Americans; Reaction to the murder of George Floyd; Economic, racial and social inequality

This is a list of protests in North Dakota related to the murder of George Floyd.

== Locations ==
=== Bismarck ===
Hundreds gathered to share solidarity for the life of George Floyd at Peace Park on May 30. A witness said she saw the passenger of a pickup truck displaying a Confederate Flag and Trump 2020 regalia point a gun at the protesters.

=== Dickinson ===
Hundreds of protesters gathered along Third Avenue on June 2 to protest for justice for George Floyd and equality in the judicial system.

=== Fargo ===
Black Lives Matter protesters marched from Island Park past the Police Station and then south on 25th Street, as reported on May 30. The protests began peacefully but became violent after 6:00 PM. Several businesses in downtown Fargo were damaged, including the historic Hotel Donaldson. Nearby Moorhead, Minnesota's African-American Mayor Johnathan Judd pressed the flesh in the crowd of thousands asking people to get more involved in their community.

=== Grand Forks ===
Hundreds of protesters marched though downtown Grand Forks on June 4, in honor of George Floyd.

=== Jamestown ===
On June 5, approximately 20 protesters held a rally on First Avenue to protest the murder of George Floyd, chanting slogans such as "Hands up, don't shoot."

=== Minot ===
On May 31, over 100 protesters gathered at Oak Park to rally against police brutality.

=== Rugby ===
On June 7, almost 50 high school students were escorted by police officers as they peacefully marched through the streets of Rugby to protest the murder of George Floyd.

=== Valley City ===
On June 7, between 70 and 85 protesters gathered in Valley City Park and marched across the bridge and through the streets in support of Black Lives Matter.

=== Williston ===
On June 5, about 30 protesters gathered at Harmon Park to support Black Lives Matter and rally against police brutality. A biker gang held a counter-protest across from them, brandishing firearms and chanting "All Lives Matter."
