= Eastwood Park =

Eastwood Park may refer to:

- Eastwood Park Historic District, a district in Minot, North Dakota, USA
- Eastwood Park, Essex, a town in Essex, England
- Eastwood Park (HM Prison), a prison in South Gloucestershire, England.
- Eastwood Park, a small park in Hasland, Chesterfield, England.
- Eastwood Park, a park in Giffnock, Scotland
