= Upper Brooklyn =

Coordinates: 48°13′46″N 101°17′56″W

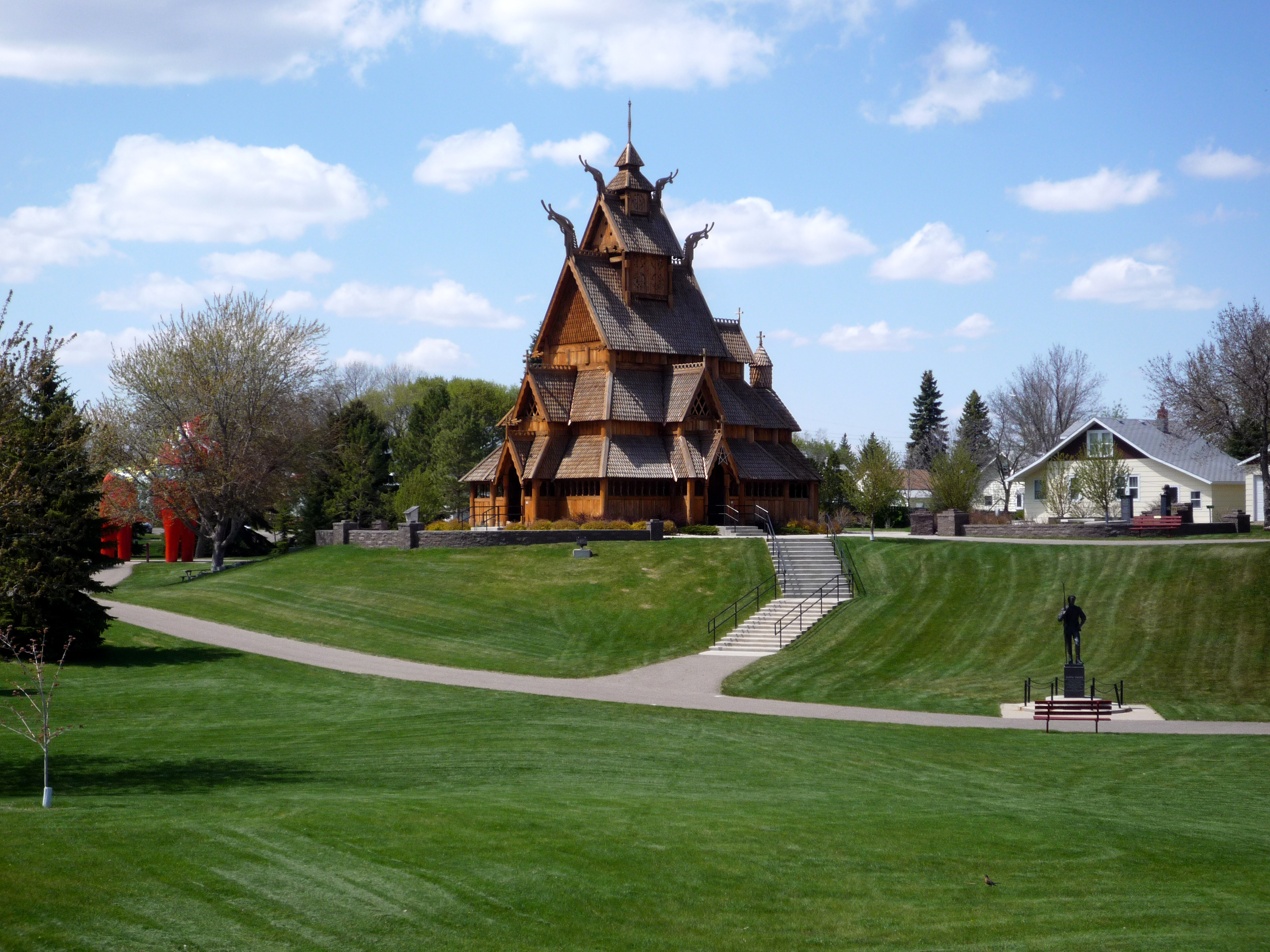
Scandinavian Heritage Park in the Upper Brooklyn neighborhood

Upper Brooklyn or Brooklyn Heights is a neighborhood on South Hill in Minot, North Dakota. The neighborhood consists of the sections of the Brooklyn Addition that are not part of Downtown Minot. The High Third neighborhood, the Lower Brooklyn neighborhood and the area around the Minot Municipal Auditorium, which were part of the Brooklyn Addition, are considered part of the downtown area. Upper Brooklyn is bordered by downtown and the BNSF railroad tracks to the north, Minot High School's Magic City Campus to the west, Eleventh Avenue SW to the south and South Broadway and Lower Brooklyn to the east. The neighborhood is approximately 0.46 square kilometers. The neighborhood is home to the Scandinavian Heritage Park and Jim Hill Middle School.

== Streets and Avenues ==
The main streets through the neighborhood are the Burdick Expressway (Fourth Street SW) and Sixth Street SW. The Avenues in Upper Brooklyn follow the typical numbered pattern of Minot's gridded system. Western Avenue is formed where the west ends of First Avenue and Second Avenue come together. Western Avenue begins near the public library at its east end and ends at the Burdick Expressway at Eighth Street at its west end. Avenue A SW is the only other avenue in the neighborhood that does not follow the numbered grid system. Avenue A falls between Eighth Avenue SW and Ninth Avenue SW.

The streets through the neighborhood were not originally numbered. The following street have since been renamed:

- Ward Street, became Second Street SW and is now South Broadway
- Jarvis Street, became Third Street SW
- Preston Street, became Fourth Street SW
- Peterson Street, became Fifth Street SW
- Swathe Street, became Sixth Street SW
- Colton Street, became Seventh Street SW
- High Street, became Eighth Street SW

Park Street, which falls between Fourth and Fifth Streets, has kept its original name. Maple Street, at the west edge of the neighborhood has also kept its original name. Summit Drive connects Upper Brooklyn with Lower Brooklyn by connecting Fourth Street SW at Avenue A with Third Street SW at Seventh Ave SW. Brooklyn Alley is the only alley in the neighborhood and runs between Park Street and Fifth Street from Sixth Avenue to Eleventh Avenue.

== See also ==
- Lower Brooklyn
