= Minot Industrial Historic District =

Historic district in North Dakota, United States

- U.S. National Register of Historic Places
- U.S. Historic district
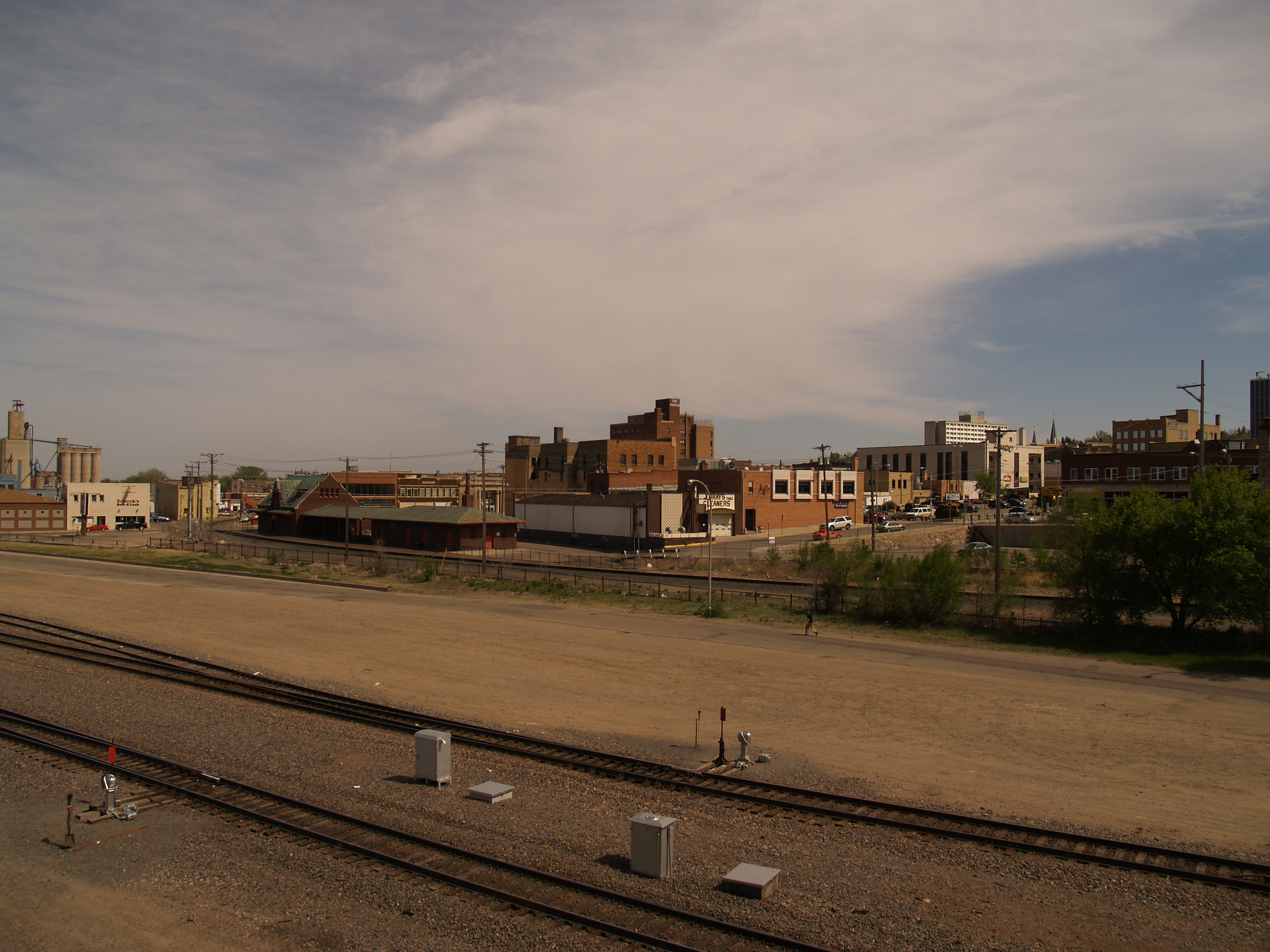
- View of the district (left half of image in particular)

- Location within North Dakota Location within the United States
- Location: Roughly bounded by Souris River, Fifth St. NE, First Ave. SE, First St. NE, Soo Line RR tracks, and Broadway, Minot, North Dakota
- Area: 195.4 acres (79.1 ha)
- Architectural style: Classical Revival, Italianate
- MPS: Minot MRA
- NRHP reference No.: 86002818
- Added to NRHP: October 16, 1986

The Minot Industrial Historic District is a 195.4-acre (79.1 ha) historic district in Downtown Minot, North Dakota, United States, that was listed on the National Register of Historic Places in 1986. It includes Classical Revival and Italianate architecture. The listing included 31 contributing buildings and one other contributing structure.

It is bounded on the north by the Souris River.
