= West Minot =

Coordinates: 48°14′50″N 101°19′04″W

West Minot is a neighborhood in Minot, North Dakota, located in the Souris River Valley. It borders Oak Park to the South, North Hill to the North, Bel Air to the west and Nubbin Park to the east. The neighborhood is largely residential and there are no commercial thoroughfares, which run through the neighborhood. It received its name when at the time it was the westernmost neighborhood in Minot. Today, there are neighborhoods, such as Bel Air further west of here, but the area has retained the name West Minot. West Minot is home to the Quentin N. Burdick Jobs Center, Minot's Hebrew Cemetery and the West Minot Church of God.
