= Minot Commercial Historic District =

Historic district in North Dakota, United States

- U.S. National Register of Historic Places
- U.S. Historic district
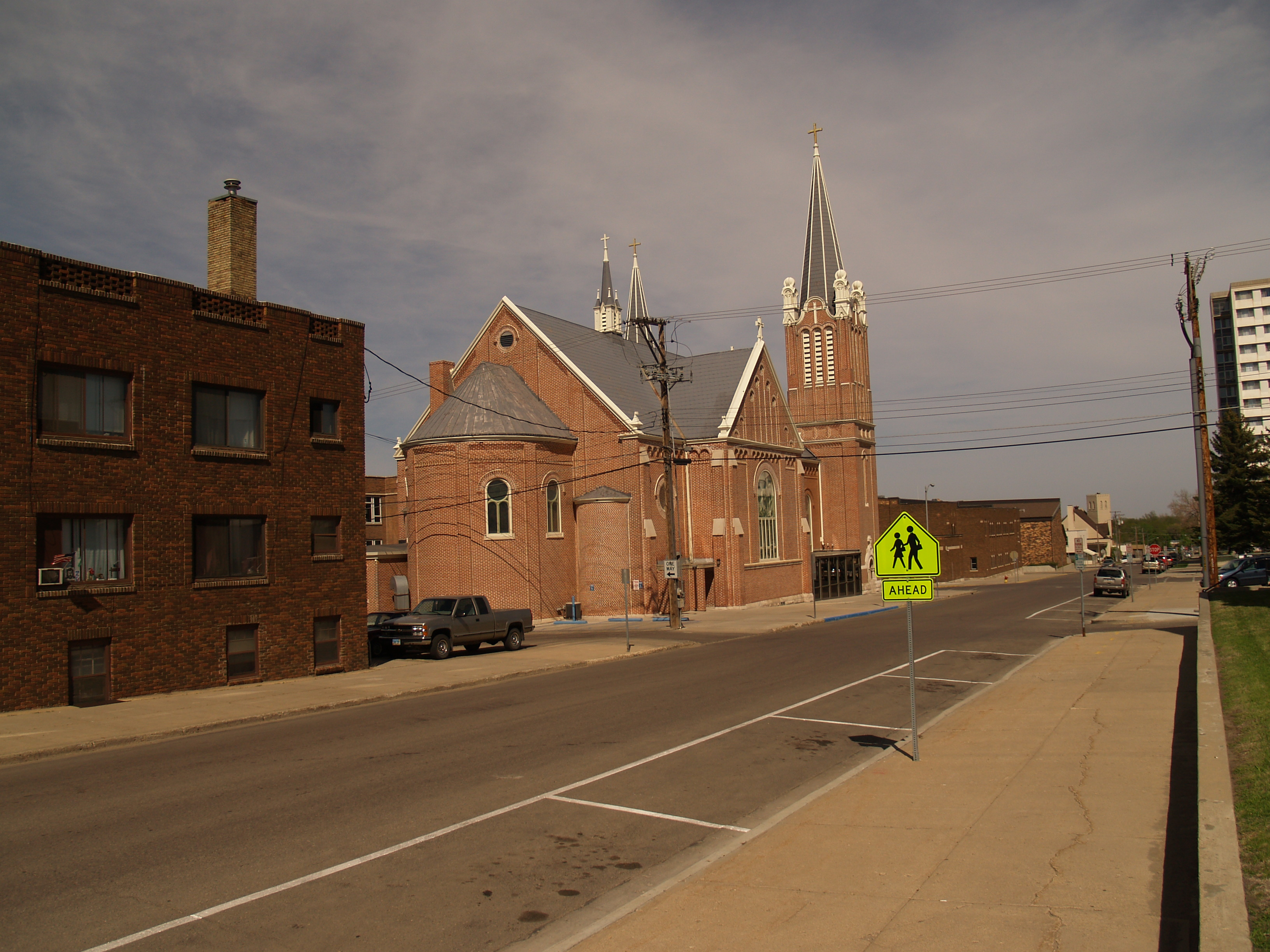
- St. Leo's, a church within the district

- Location within North Dakota Location within the United States
- Location: Roughly bounded by Soo Line RR tracks, Burdick Expressway, and Broadway, Minot, North Dakota
- Coordinates: 48.23448°N 101.29302°W
- Area: 103 acres (42 ha)
- Architectural style: Classical Revival, Early Commercial, Late Victorian
- MPS: Minot MRA
- NRHP reference No.: 86002823
- Added to NRHP: October 16, 1980

The Minot Commercial Historic District is a 103-acre (42 ha) historic district in Minot, North Dakota that was listed on the National Register of Historic Places in 1980. It includes Classical Revival, Early Commercial, and Late Victorian. The listing included 40 contributing buildings.

It includes an Italianate style Masonic Hall building, on Main Street, built in 1907, and a Sons of Norway building at the intersection of Broadway and Central that was built in 1915. The latter "is an eclectic mixture of Neo-Classical elements dominated by a central three-story facade with Renaissance Revival details."

== See also ==
- Downtown Minot
