= West Oaks =

Coordinates: 48°14′05″N 101°18′51″W

West Oaks is a neighborhood in Minot, North Dakota. The neighborhood is bounded by Oak Park to the North, the Souris River to the east, the Soo Line Railroad tracks to the south and Sixteenth Street SW. The neighborhood is home to the West Oaks Animal Hospital, the West Oaks Apartments, Harleys Automotive Center and gas station, Eagles Wings Community Fellowship and a number of single family homes. Oak Park's south entrance is located in the neighborhood on Oak Drive SW. A thin strip of land between the Oak Park Oxbow and the Souris River connects the park with the neighborhood. The neighborhood was greatly impacted by the Souris River flood in 2011. In June 2011, the Washington Post printed a story about the Minot flood on the front page with an accompanying photograph of Harleys and the nearby Arrowhead Mall. Water inundated both structures, despite the large dikes constructed around both buildings. On June 26, 2011, the New York Times also printed an article with an aerial photograph of the flooded Harleys. Similar aerial photographs of the flood at that location are displayed at the Harleys gas station.
