= Minot Carnegie Library =

- U.S. National Register of Historic Places
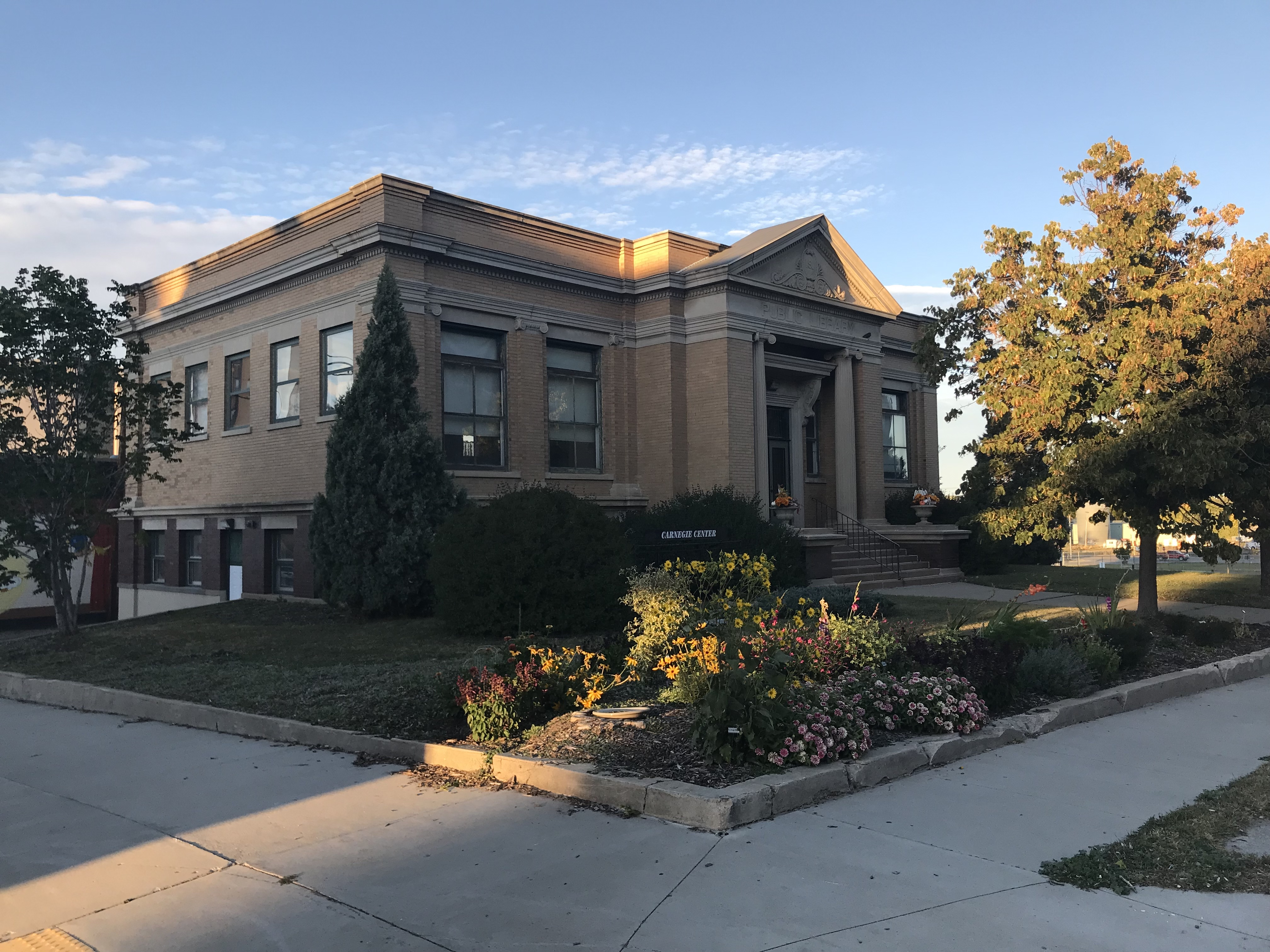
- Carnegie Library in Downtown Minot

- Location within North Dakota Location within the United States
- Interactive map showing the location of Minor Carnegie Library
- Location: 105 2nd Ave., SE, Minot, North Dakota
- Coordinates: 48°14′5″N 101°17′27″W
- Built: 1911
- Architect: Woodruff & McGulpin
- Architectural style: Classical Revival
- NRHP reference No.: 80002929
- Added to NRHP: November 10, 1980

Minot Carnegie Library on 2nd Ave., SE, in Downtown Minot, North Dakota.

It was built in 1911 and was designed by Minot architects Woodruff & McGulpin in Classical Revival style. It has also been known as Free Public Library, Carnegie Library and Minot Public Library. It was listed on the National Register of Historic Places in 1980. It served as the public library for Minot from 1912 until 1965, until the new Minot Public Library building was built.

It was used as a library until 1965, then used as a senior center, then was vacant from 1979 until the time of NRHP listing.
