= Minot station (Soo Line) =

Museum in the United States

Minot
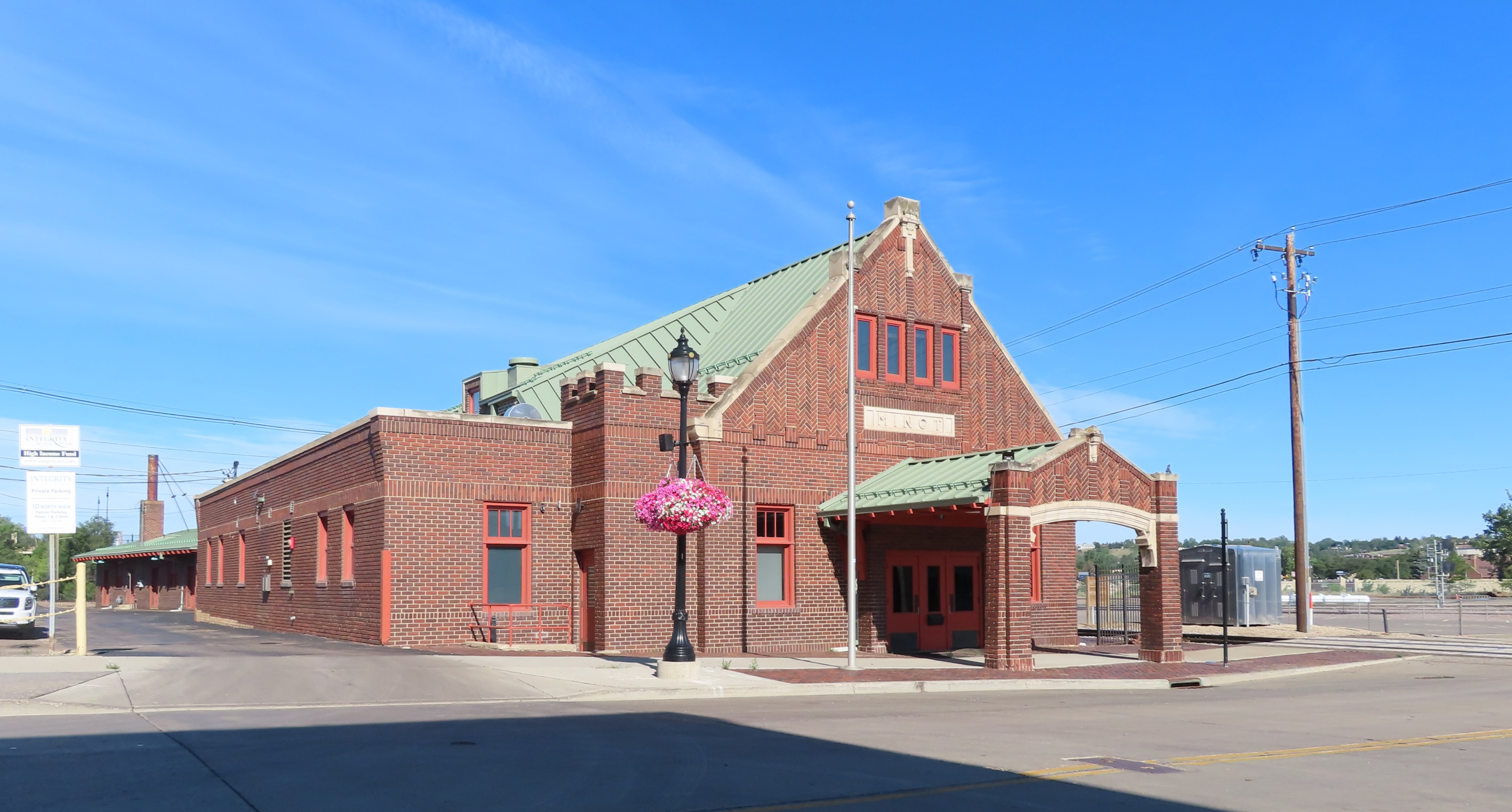
- Minot station in 2021

General information
- Location: 11 North Main Street, Minot, North Dakota 58703
- System: Former Soo Line passenger rail station

History
- Closed: December 9, 1963
- Rebuilt: 1912

Services
Preceding station	Soo Line	Following station
Foxholm toward Portal	Main Line	Sawyer toward Chicago
- Soo Line Passenger Depot
- U.S. National Register of Historic Places
- Location within North Dakota Location within the United States
- Location: 11 North Main Street, Minot, North Dakota
- Coordinates: 48°14′13″N 101°17′34″W
- Area: less than one acre
- Built: 1912
- Architect: Kenyon, William M.
- NRHP reference No.: 78001996
- Added to NRHP: January 20, 1978
Location

Minot station, built in 1912, now houses the Old Soo Depot Transportation Museum. It is located in historic Downtown Minot, North Dakota, USA. The depot once served the Minneapolis, St. Paul and Sault Ste. Marie Railroad, which is now part of the Canadian Pacific Railway.

It was listed on the National Register of Historic Places in 1978 as the Soo Line Passenger Depot.

Passenger train service to the Soo Line Minot station ended on December 9, 1963, when trains 13 and 14 were discontinued from the Twin Cities to Portal, North Dakota. Mixed train service continued for some time thereafter.
