= Minot Public Schools =

School district in North Dakota, US

Address
- 215 2Nd St Se Minot, North Dakota, 58701; United States

District information
- Type: Public
- Grades: PK–12
- Schools: 21
- NCES District ID: 3813030

Students and staff
- Students: 7,683 (2025–2026)
- Teachers: 551.48 (on an FTE basis) (2025–2026)
- Staff: 741.88 (on an FTE basis) (2025–2026)
- Student–teacher ratio: 13.93 (2025–2026)

Other information
- Website: www.minot.k12.nd.us

Minot Public Schools (MPS) is a system of publicly funded K-12 schools in Minot, North Dakota. There are thirteen elementary schools, four middle schools, two high schools, and one alternative high school. Three schools (two elementary & one middle school) are located on Minot AFB, fifteen miles north. Minot City Transit provides busing service.

== Schools ==
=== Elementary schools ===
- Bel Air (Bobcats)
- Dakota (on Minot AFB)
- Edison
- John Hoeven (Hawks)
- Lewis & Clark
- Longfellow
- North Plains (on Minot AFB)
- Perkett
- Roosevelt
- Sunnyside
- Washington

=== Middle schools ===
- Erik Ramstad
- Jim Hill
- Central Middle School
- Memorial (on Minot AFB)

=== High school ===
- Minot High School (Magicians)
- Minot North High School (Sentinels)
- Souris River Campus (alternative high school)
