= Minot Municipal Auditorium =

Building in North Dakota, United States

- Interactive map of Minot Municipal Auditorium
- Location: Minot, North Dakota
- Coordinates: 48°14′01″N 101°17′57″W
- Owner: City of Minot
- Capacity: 5,000
- Public transit: Minot City Transit

Construction
- Opened: 1954

Tenants
- Magic City Snowbears (IBA) (1996–2001); Minot SkyRockets (CBA) (2006–2009)

The Minot Municipal Auditorium is a 5,000-seat multi-purpose arena in Downtown Minot, North Dakota.

It was built in 1954. It hosts conventions and sporting events, primarily basketball, and competes with the MSU Dome and All Seasons Arena for local events. It was the home of the Minot SkyRockets basketball team. The auditorium is also the location of the municipal court, Minot Park District office, and transfer hub for Minot City Transit.

== Notable performances ==
Notable performances at the venue include The Beach Boys (1966), Johnny Cash (1967), Kiss (1974), Rush (1977), Metallica (1989), Puddle of Mudd, Papa Roach and Kansas (2012), and Marilyn Manson (2015).

== 2011 Souris River Flood ==
The facility was used as a shelter for the evacuees during the 2011 Souris River flood. The facility was also used as a Federal Emergency Management Agency registering office during the 2011 Souris River flood.
