= Minot station =

Train station in Minot, North Dakota

Minot, ND
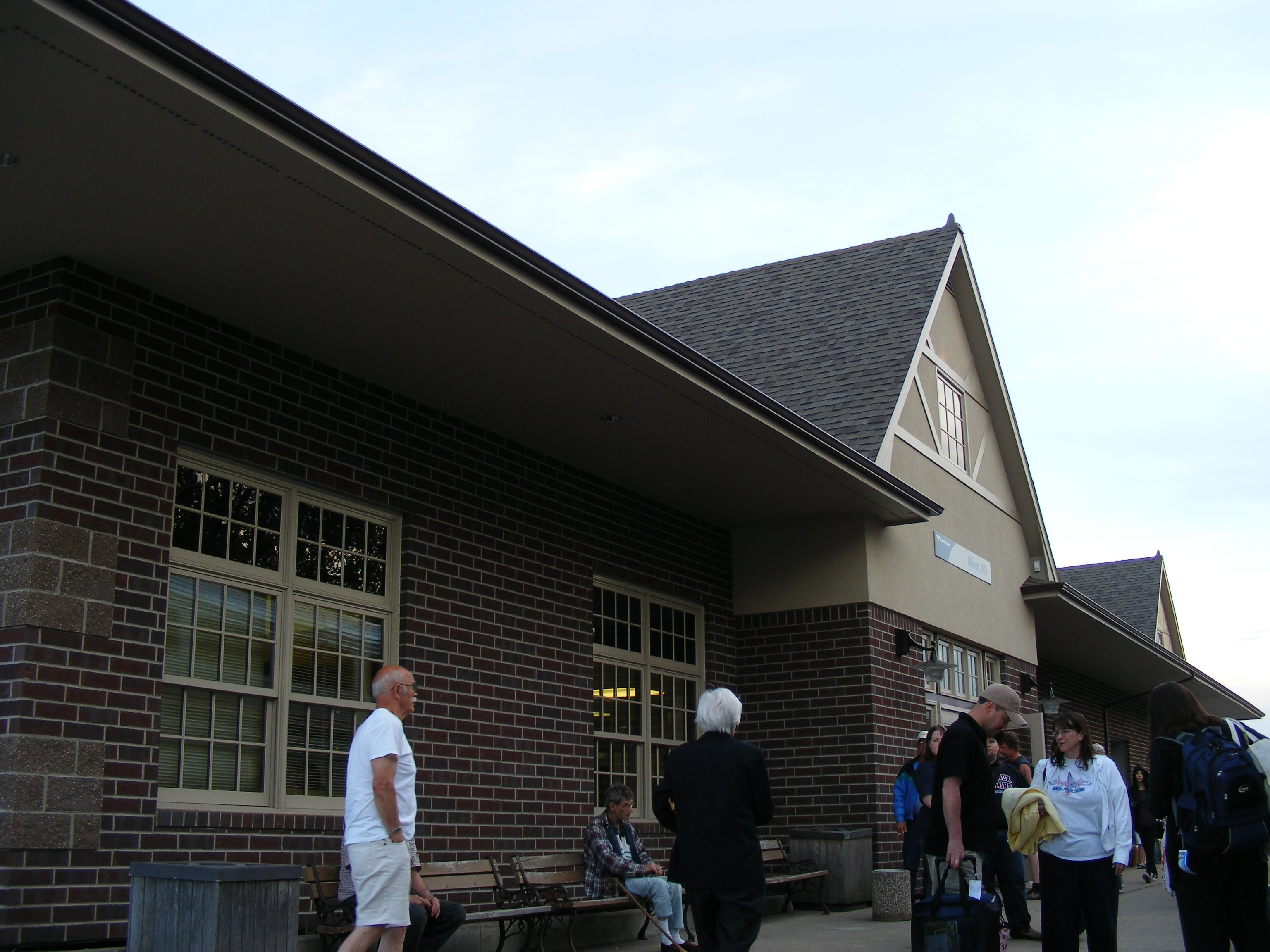
- The station building at Minot after the 2008 restoration

General information
- Location: 400 1st Avenue S.W. Minot, North Dakota; United States
- Coordinates: 48.2361°N 101.2987°W
- Owner: BNSF Railway
- Line: BNSF Glasgow Subdivision
- Platforms: 1 side platform
- Tracks: 2

Construction
- Parking: Yes
- Accessible: Yes

Other information
- Station code: Amtrak: MOT

History
- Opened: June 18, 1893
- Rebuilt: 1910, 1975, 2008–2010

Passengers
- FY 2025: 18,775 (Amtrak)

Services
| Preceding station | Amtrak | Following station |
|---|---|---|
| Stanley toward Seattle or Portland | Empire Builder | Rugby toward Chicago |
Former services
| Preceding station | Great Northern Railway | Following station |
|---|---|---|
| Ralston toward Seattle | Main Line Via Grand Forks | Surrey toward St. Paul |
| Ralston toward Seattle | Main Line Via New Rockford | Surrey toward St. Paul |
Location

Minot station is a train station in Minot, North Dakota served by Amtrak, the national railroad passenger system. The station is located at the site of the former Great Northern Railway station, adjacent to the Minot Public Library, and close to Minot's City Hall and Downtown Minot.

Minot is a service stop for Amtrak's daily Empire Builder, which also serves six other cities in North Dakota. This is the only scheduled service stop—20 minute refuel and crew change—between Minneapolis, Minnesota and Havre, Montana. Minot station is the busiest Amtrak station in the state.

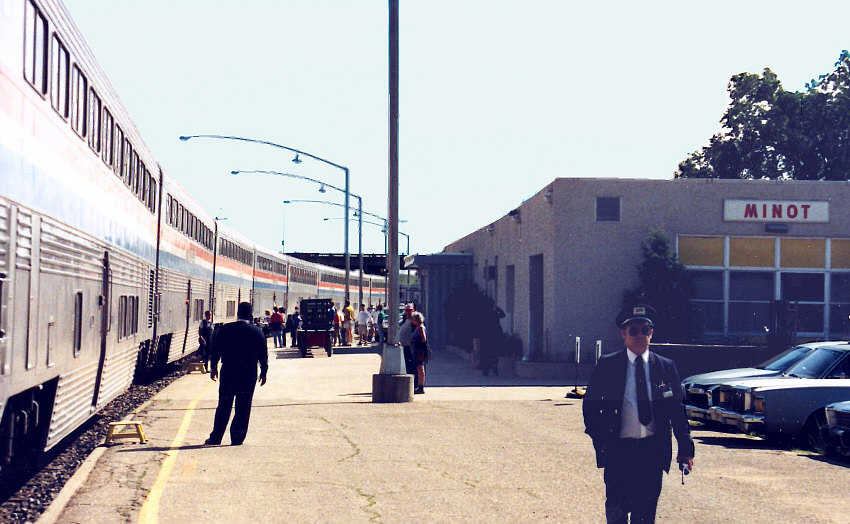
Amtrak Empire Builder at Minot, 1991

The station was built in 1905 by the Great Northern Railway. It originally featured a brick exterior and a gabled roof. In 1975, the station was modernized; a stucco exterior and a flat roofline drastically altered the appearance of the depot. According to Great American Stations, the Amtrak Depot Restoration Committee used federal, state and city funds to renovate the station in recent years. In 2008, the brick exterior and gabled roof were restored, while the renovation of the interior was completed in Fall 2010. However, flooding in the summer of 2011 damaged the interior of the main waiting room, which was then closed for repairs. A small temporary waiting room was opened in early Nov 2011 for Empire Builder passengers to use until the main waiting room was repaired.

In fall 2012, Amtrak proceeded with the next round of improvements, including repairs to the waiting room's tile floor and wall paneling. Work was completed by April 2013 and a few weeks later, on National Train Day, the city held an open house at the depot. That September, 15 wood benches were installed in the main waiting room. The Minot Area Community Foundation, which supports both local and national charities and charitable causes, funded the project through a $30,000 grant.

The platform, tracks and station building are all owned by BNSF Railway.

Minot City Transit does not directly serve the station; however, buses travel north-south on both Broadway and 6th Street and may be flagged down at any street corner.

== Bibliography ==
- Allen, W.F. (1893). Travelers Official Guide of the Railway and Steam Navigation Lines in the United States and Canada. New York, New York: National Railway Publication Company.
