= South Hill, Minot =

South Hill
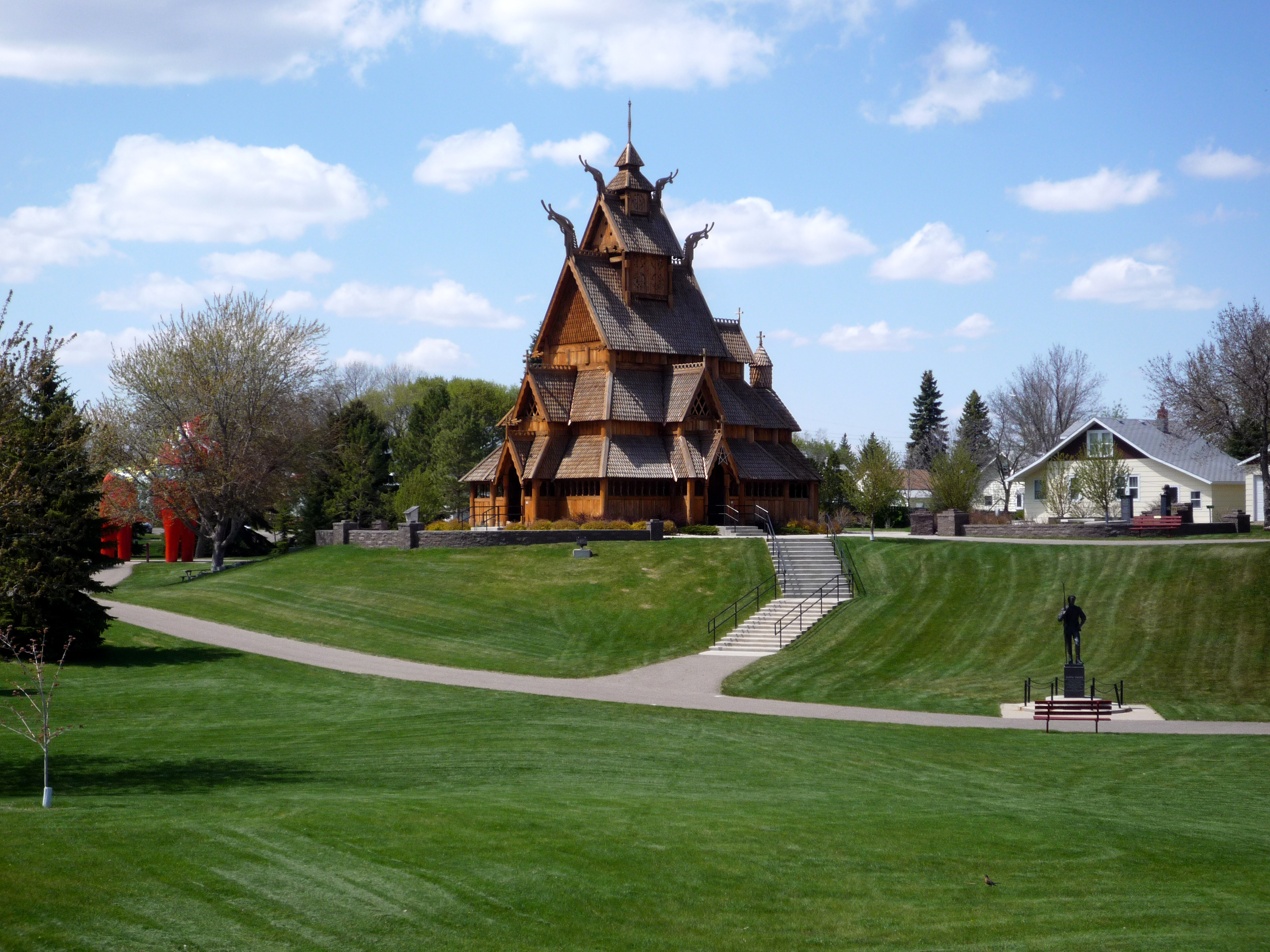
- Scandinavian Park in South Hill
- Interactive map of South Hill
- Coordinates: 48.211°N 101.296°W
- Country: United States
- State: North Dakota
- County: Ward County
- City: Minot

Government
  - Minot City Council: Larry Frey, David Lehner, Amy Moen, Milton Miller, Scott Knudsvig, Tom Seymour, Mark Jantzer, Blake Krabseth, Kevin Connole, Lisa Olson
  - State Assembly: Roger Brabandt (R), Scott Louser (R), Larry Bellew (R), Dan Ruby (R), Roscoe Streyle (R), Andrew G. Maragos (R)
  - State Senate: David Hogue (R), Randall A. Burckhard (R), Oley Larsen (R)
  - U.S. House: Kevin Cramer (R)

Area
  - Total: 5.10 sq mi (13.20 km^{2})
- Highest elevation: 1,762 ft (537 m)
- Lowest elevation: 1,637 ft (499 m)
- ZIP codes: 58701
- Area code: 701

South Hill is a neighborhood in Minot, North Dakota, one of three major areas in the city, others being North Hill and The Valley, it is located south of the Souris River, above the Souris River Valley. It is a primarily residential neighborhood, although there are commercial zones along South Broadway, 20th Ave SW, 37th Ave SW, and around the Dakota Square Mall.

== Geography ==
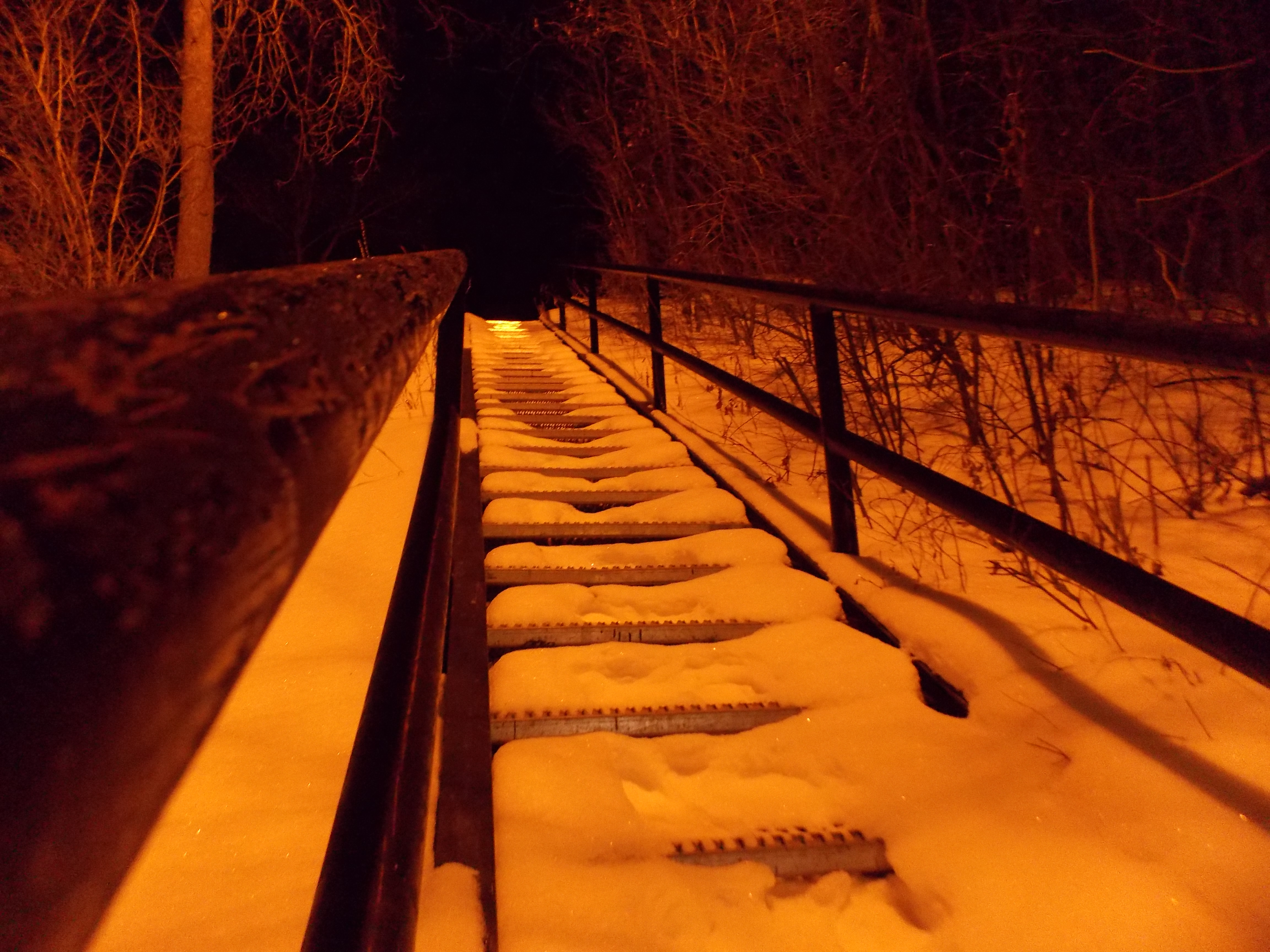
First Street Stairs connecting South Hill with Downtown Minot

South Hill is located south of The Valley. The neighborhood is bound by the Souris River Valley to the north and the city limits on the east, south and west. The major streets through South Hill include, South Broadway, 16th St SW, 20th Ave SW, 37th Ave SW, and the Bypass, which carries US 52, US 2 and US 83 around Minot. All the streets in Minot are gridded, based on the intersection of Central Avenue and Main Street downtown. All of the roads in South Hill are roughly south of Burdick Expressway and Valley Street. Main Street in South Hill divides streets east and west.

== Economy ==
=== Top employers ===
The top employers on South Hill, according to the Minot Area Development Corporation in the first quarter of 2013 are:

#	Employer	# of Employees
1	Marketplace Foods	556
2	Menards	315
3	Walmart	300

== Attractions ==
- Dakota Square Mall
- Lucy's Amusement Park
- Maysa Arena
- Scandinavian Heritage Park
- Town and Country Shopping Center

== Parks and recreation ==
- Radio City Park
- South Hill Baseball Complex/Scheels Complex
- Scandinavian Heritage Park

== Education ==
Minot High School's Magic City Campus is located in the South Hill neighborhood on Eleventh Avenue SW. The building was constructed in 1973 and is home to the juniors and seniors in the Minot District school system. After the new Minot North High School opens, both schools will become 9-12 grade schools. Edison Elementary School, Jim Hill Middle School and Washington Elementary School are also located in South Hill. The North Dakota State University North Central Research Extension Center is located on Broadway, less than a mile south of the city limits.

== Transportation ==
The main roads accessing South Hill are the Broadway and the Bypass. The Bypass has exits for South Hill at Broadway, Sixteenth Street SW and Tenth Street SW (eastbound only).

=== Bus service ===
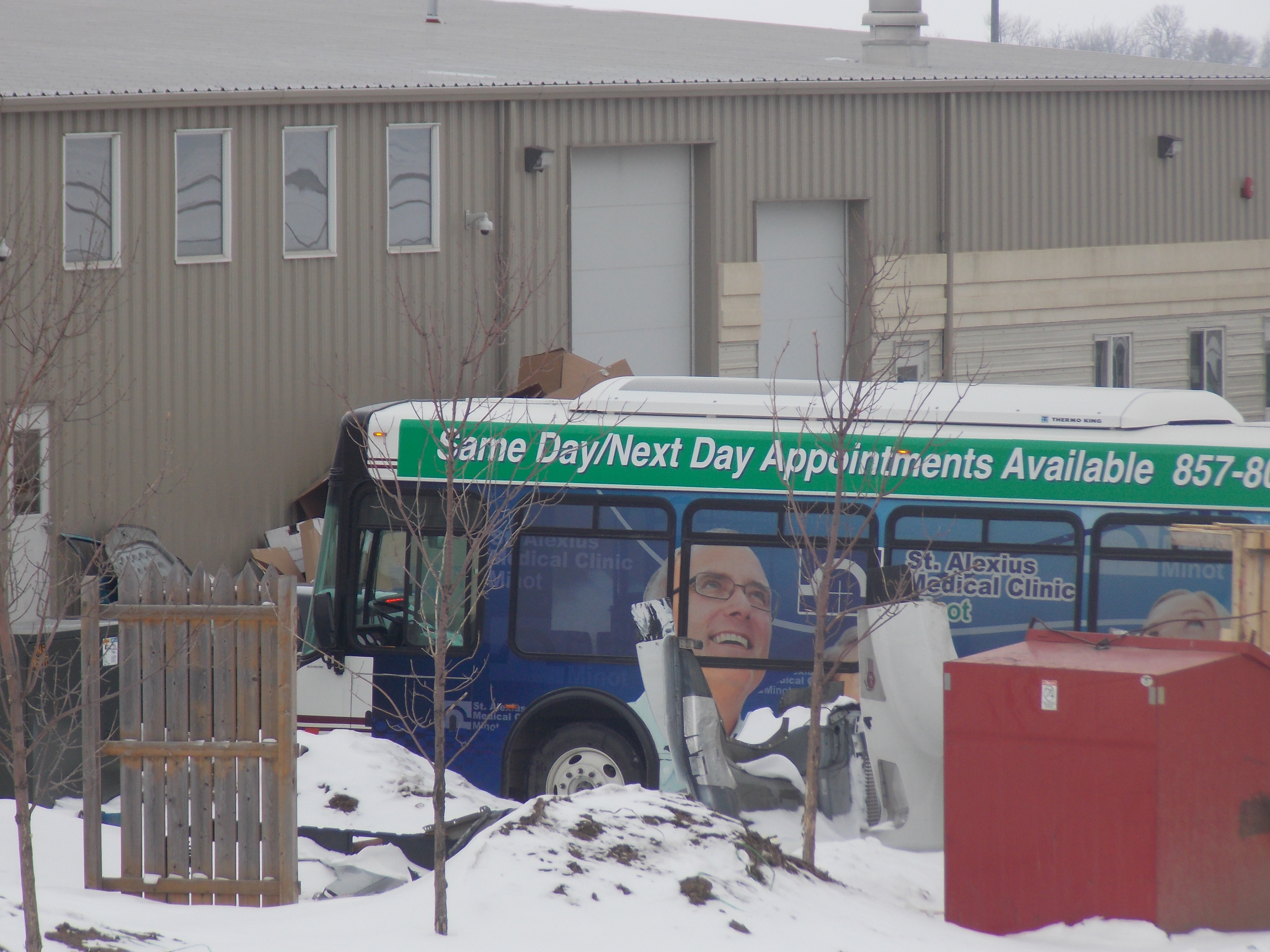
Minot city bus

Minot City Transit operates several bus routes, which serve South Hill on weekdays. Cash fare or tokens can be purchased upon boarding the bus. The South #1 Route in the morning connects Edison Elementary School, Minot High School's Magic City Campus, the Town and Country Shopping Center, Warrendale, Washington Elementary School and Woodridge. The South #2 Route connects downtown with the Dakota Square Mall, Edison Elementary and the Magic City Campus in South Hill. The Washington Route in the morning connects Anthony Hill, Charlebois, Edison Elementary School, Warrendale, Washington Elementary School and Woodridge. The South #1 Route in the afternoon connects downtown with Brooklyn, Edison Elementary School, Jim Hill Middle School, Town and Country Shopping Center, Warrendale and Washington Elementary School in South Hill. The South #2 Route connects the Town and Country Shopping Center with Southwest Minot. The South #3 Route in the afternoon connects the Town and Country Shopping Center with the Dakota Square Mall, Edgewood Vista and the South Hill Softball Complex. The West Route in the afternoon connects Town and Country Shopping Center in South Hill with downtown, Minot State University, Oak Park and Spring Lake in the Souris Valley. The North Route in the afternoon connects the Town and Country Center in South Hill with downtown, Minot State University and North Hill.

== Future development ==
Several housing developments are underway throughout South Hill. A number of hotels and retail develops are also underway in the South Hill neighborhood, especially along South Broadway and Sixteenth Street Southwest. There have been plans discussed for a South Bypass in South Hill that would carry traffic from US 2 and US 52 from the east to points south and west of the city.

== Events ==
- Arts in the Park, summer, Scandinavian Heritage Park
- Integrity Jazz Festival, July, Scandinavian Heritage Park
- Midsummer Night Festival, June, Scandinavian Heritage Park
- WhyNotFest, August, Downtown Minot
