= Bel Air, Minot =

Bel Air
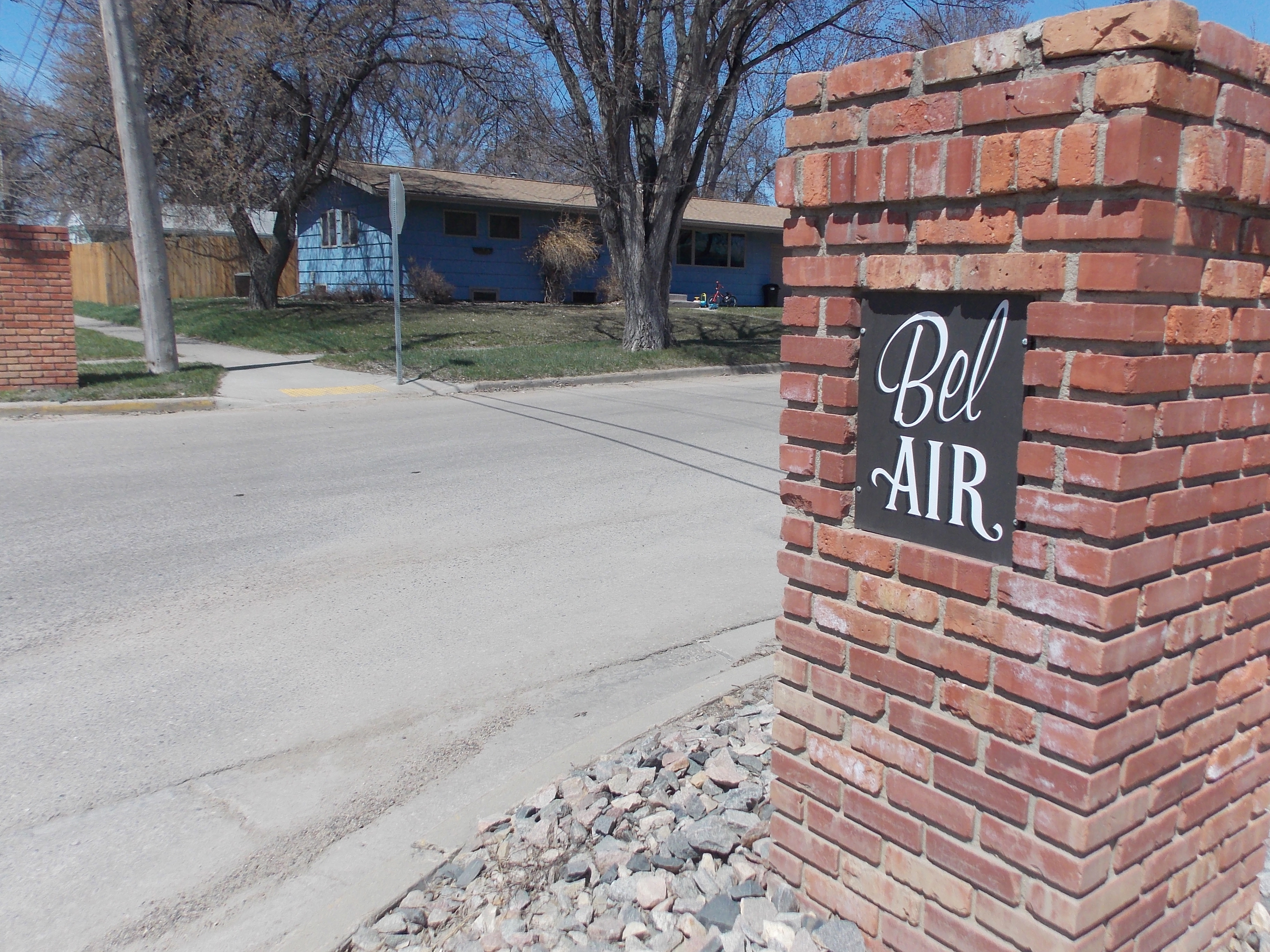
- Bel Air from Fourth Avenue NW
- Interactive map of Bel Air
- Coordinates: 48.242°N 101.325°W
- Country: United States
- State: North Dakota
- County: Ward County
- City: Minot

Government
  - Minot City Council: Scott Knudsvig, Amy Moen, Milton Miller, Tom Seymour
  - State Assembly: Larry Bellew (R), Dan Ruby (R)
  - State Senate: David Hogue (R)
  - U.S. House: Kevin Cramer (R)

Area
  - Total: 0.34 sq mi (.87 km^{2})
- Highest elevation: 1,683 ft (513 m)
- Lowest elevation: 1,552 ft (473 m)
- ZIP codes: 58703
- Area code: 701

Bel Air is a neighborhood in Minot, North Dakota, located in the Souris River Valley. It is roughly bound by North Hill to the north, Sixteenth Street NW to the east, Fourth Avenue NW to the south and the city limits on the west. The neighborhood was home to about a thousand people in 2010. The neighborhood is home to Bel Air Elementary School on Twenty Fifth Street NW. The neighborhood was developed as the Bel Air Addition in 1956. Fourth Avenue is home to a number of businesses in Bel Air, many of which were severely damaged in the Souris River flood in 2011. Bel Air is home to the Church of the Living God, the Bible Fellowship Church and the Christ Lutheran Church.

== Transportation ==
Minot City Transit operates three lines that serve the Bel Air neighborhood in the morning and afternoon: Bel Air-Perkett Route, the North Central Route and the West Route. The West Route in the early afternoon also services the Bel Air neighborhood.

== Future development ==
North Ridge Villas is a planned community currently being constructed in the western part of Bel Air. The community will be home to two story single family homes. It is being built along a coulee to the west of Twenty-Seventh Street NW. Two streets are planned for the community: Ninth Avenue NW and Twenty-Eighth Street NW. Ninth Avenue will connect Twenty-Seventh and Twenty-Eighth Street and will not connect with the existing Ninth Avenue-University Avenue corridor. Likewise, Twenty-Eighth Street will have cul-de-sacs at both ends of the development and will not connect with other segments of the street. The neighborhood will only be accessible from Ninth Avenue from the east at Twenty-Seventh Street. A trail along the neighboring coulee has also been proposed in plans for the community.
