= Broadway (Minot, North Dakota) =

Street in Minot, North Dakota, USA

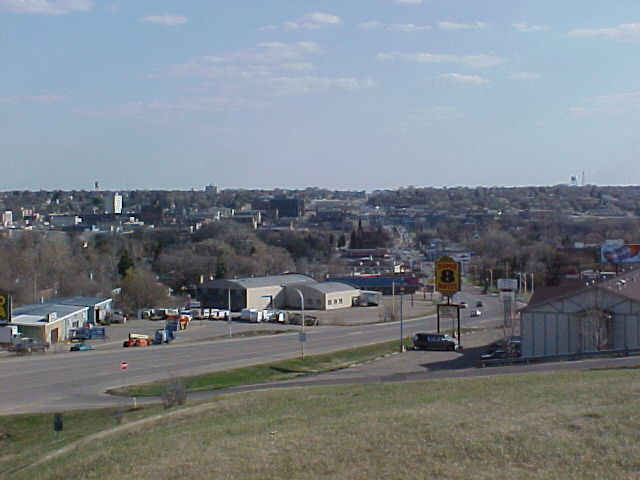
Broadway, facing south into the city

Broadway, previously known as 2nd Street West, is a major north-south city route in Minot, North Dakota. It forms part of U.S. Route 83 (US 83).

Commercial zones line Broadway's entire length, aside from a handful of apartment complexes. Along its route, it intersects with the US 2/US 52 bypass, Burdick Expressway, and University Avenue, among others. Broadway also travels adjacent to the Minot International Airport.

The street has four lanes of traffic throughout the city, with an additional center turn lane between Burdick Expressway and the US 2/US 52 bypass.
