= Dakota Square Mall =

Coordinates: 48.206375°N 101.311326°W

- Location: Minot, North Dakota, United States
- Opened: 1980
- Developer: General Growth Properties
- Owner: CBL Properties
- Num. of stores: 70
- Num. of anchor tenants: 11 (10 open, 1 vacant)
- Floor area: 675,000 square feet (62,700 m^{2})
- Floors: 1
- Public transit: Minot City Transit

Dakota Square Mall is an enclosed shopping center in the city of Minot, North Dakota. The mall's anchor stores are JCPenney, Scheels All Sports, Target, Barnes & Noble, AMC Theatres, T-Mobile, Carter's, Old Navy, and Ulta Beauty.

== Overview ==
At 675,000 square feet (62,700 m^{2}), as of 2005, the Dakota Square Mall is the largest mall within a 110-mile (180 km) radius. It is the third largest mall in North Dakota, boasting 70 shops, with two major anchor stores (JCPenney and Target), a food court, and a nine-screen AMC Classic Dakota Square 9 with stadium seating. Located 50 miles (80 km) from the Canada–US border, the mall also draws a significant number of customers from Canada.

One unique feature of the mall is a Sleep Inn & Suites directly attached to the mall itself, which opened in November 2003. The hotel also features Splashdown Dakota Super Slides, a 24,000-square-foot (2,200 m^{2}) water park complex which opened in April 2004. Dakota Square is one of only a few shopping malls in the United States to feature an attached hotel.

== History ==
The mall opened in 1980.

Formerly owned by JLL, the mall was later owned by The Lightstone Group and sold again to CBL & Associates Properties in May 2012.

Barnes & Noble is located in the mall and opened on March 12, 2008. Also in 2008, Scheels All Sports expanded into a store previously occupied by Old Navy. As a result, Old Navy relocated within the mall.

On June 6, 2017, it was announced that Sears would be closing as part of a plan to close 72 stores nationwide. The store closed in September 2017.

On April 18, 2018, it was announced that Herberger's would also be closing as parent company The Bon-Ton Stores was going out of business. The store closed on August 26, 2018. That space has been divided into smaller stores like Party City, Ross Dress For Less, T-Mobile, and Ulta Beauty.

On February 19, 2021, it was announced that Scheels All Sports would be relocating to the former Sears space in 2022.

In 2025, Party City closed as part of a plan to close nearly 700 stores across 45 states.
