= Eastwood Park Historic District =

Historic district in North Dakota, United States

- U.S. National Register of Historic Places
- U.S. Historic district
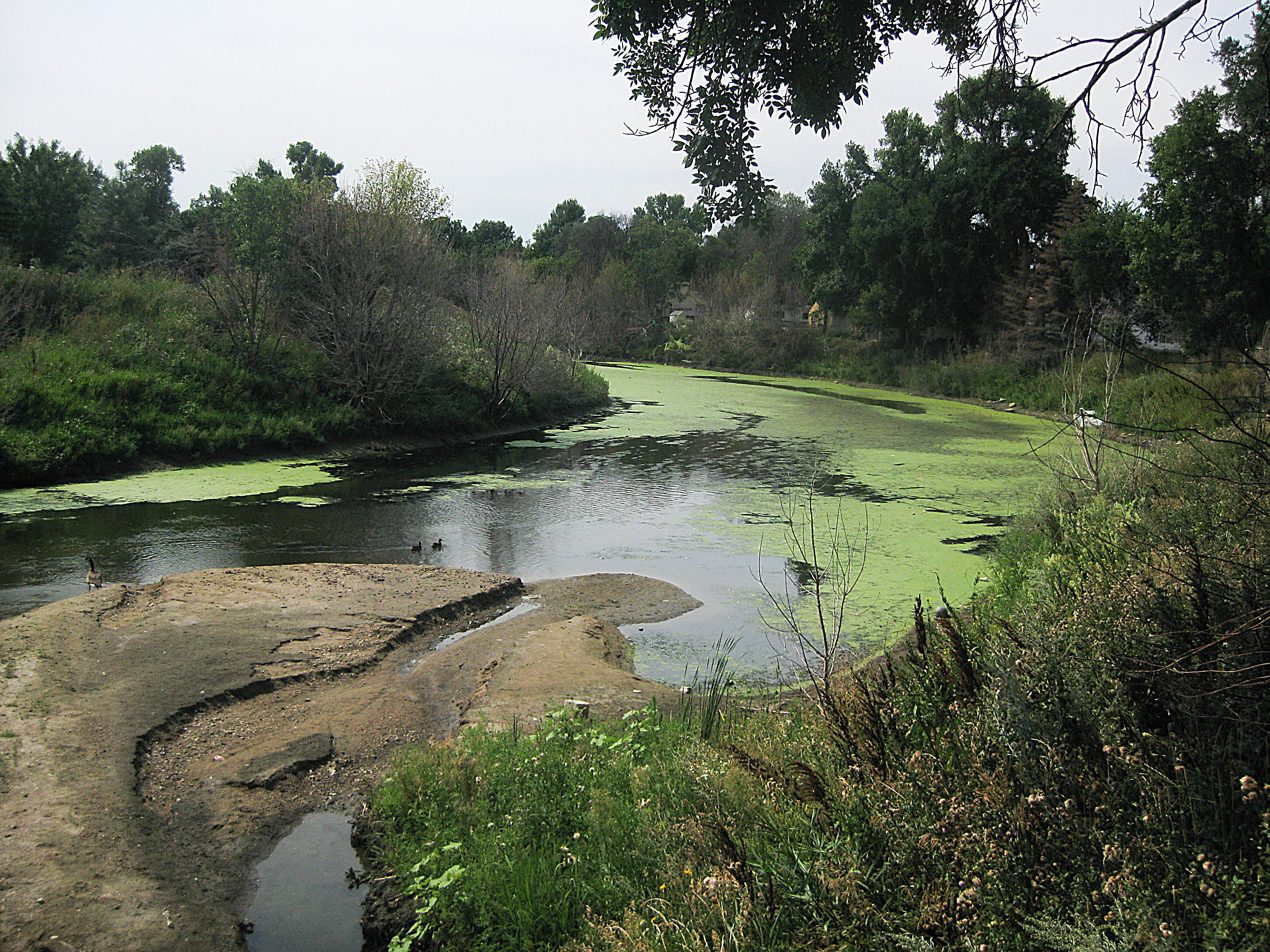

- Location within North Dakota Location within the United States
- Location: Bounded by Old Souris Oxbow, Minot, North Dakota
- Coordinates: 48°14′6″N 101°16′50″W
- Area: 180 acres (73 ha)
- Architectural style: Bungalow/Craftsman, Tudor Revival
- MPS: Minot MRA
- NRHP reference No.: 86002824
- Added to NRHP: October 16, 1986

The Eastwood Park Historic District is a historic district in Minot, North Dakota. It was listed on the National Register of Historic Places in 1986. The listing included 118 contributing buildings and one contributing structure on 180 acres (73 ha).

This 12 block area, in an oxbow of the Mouse River, was subdivided and platted into the city of Minot by K. E. and Belle Leighton in August 1906. The neighborhood's proximity to the downtown business district made it appealing to Minot's prominent families

The area reflects a variety of early 20th century architectural styles including: Princess Ann, Craftsman, Tudor Revival, Mission Revival, Dutch Colonial, Greek Revival, Arts and Crafts, Georgian Colonial and Sears Catalog Homes.

Catalog homes were mail-order kits from Sears Roebuck and Company and other companies. “Kit” homes were delivered by rail and pieced together by the owner. The reason for the popularity of kit homes was threefold. The homes were fairly easy to finance, the kits supplied all or nearly all of the supplies needed to build the home and they mimicked nearly every popular style. One significant advantage of the catalog homes was the ease with which they could be added onto. If the house was built between 1900 and 1940 and bears a resemblance to a particular style, but has differences, it still may be a catalog home.

Many houses are virtually unchanged while others have been modified over the past 100 years. In spite of the passing of time, the neighborhood and tree-covered homes of Eastwood Park have retained their early-20th Century character.

In 1969 the area suffered major damage from the flood waters of the Mouse River.

Eastwood Park has also been the home to the Jewish Synagogue and the Greek Orthodox Church, which is still located here.

The only remaining “False Arch” bridge in North Dakota still provides pedestrian access from downtown Minot.
