= Oak Park, Minot, North Dakota =

Park and neighborhood in Minot, ND

Christmas in the Park light display at Oak Park in 2012

Oak Park is a park and surrounding neighborhood in the Souris Valley in Minot, North Dakota.

The wooded park is over 50 acres (20 ha) in size. In addition to the namesake oak trees, ash and elm trees are also commonly found in the park. The eastern edge of the park borders the Souris River, also called the Mouse River. A small oxbow lake is also located in the park. Oak Park has numerous walking/biking trails, both paved and unpaved; a splash pad; and volleyball court.

The Souris Valley Birding Club meets regularly at the park, which is visited by hooded mergansers, wood ducks, Canada geese, kingfishers, great blue herons, and other birds. The park is home to concerts in the park run by the Minot Area Council of Arts, through their Arts in the Park program. On Tuesdays, Thursdays, and Saturdays from July to October, a farmers market also operates out of Oak Park. In 2011, the farmers market at the park was temporarily moved to the North Hill Soccer Complex because of the 2011 Souris River flood. On August 4, 2010, a man was found dead in the park from an apparent suicide. Oak Park was the winner of the 2011 America's Favorite Park Contest sponsored by Coca-Cola and is set to receive a $100,000 grant.

The Oak Park Theater sits across from Oak Park. It is currently the only independent operating movie theater in the city of Minot. The theater opened in 1961, but was closed in 1980. It operated as a pool hall until 2000, when it was converted back to a theater specializing in second run films. In 2011, the theater was damaged in the Souris River flood.
