= Minot City Transit =

Public transit agency in Minot, North Dakota

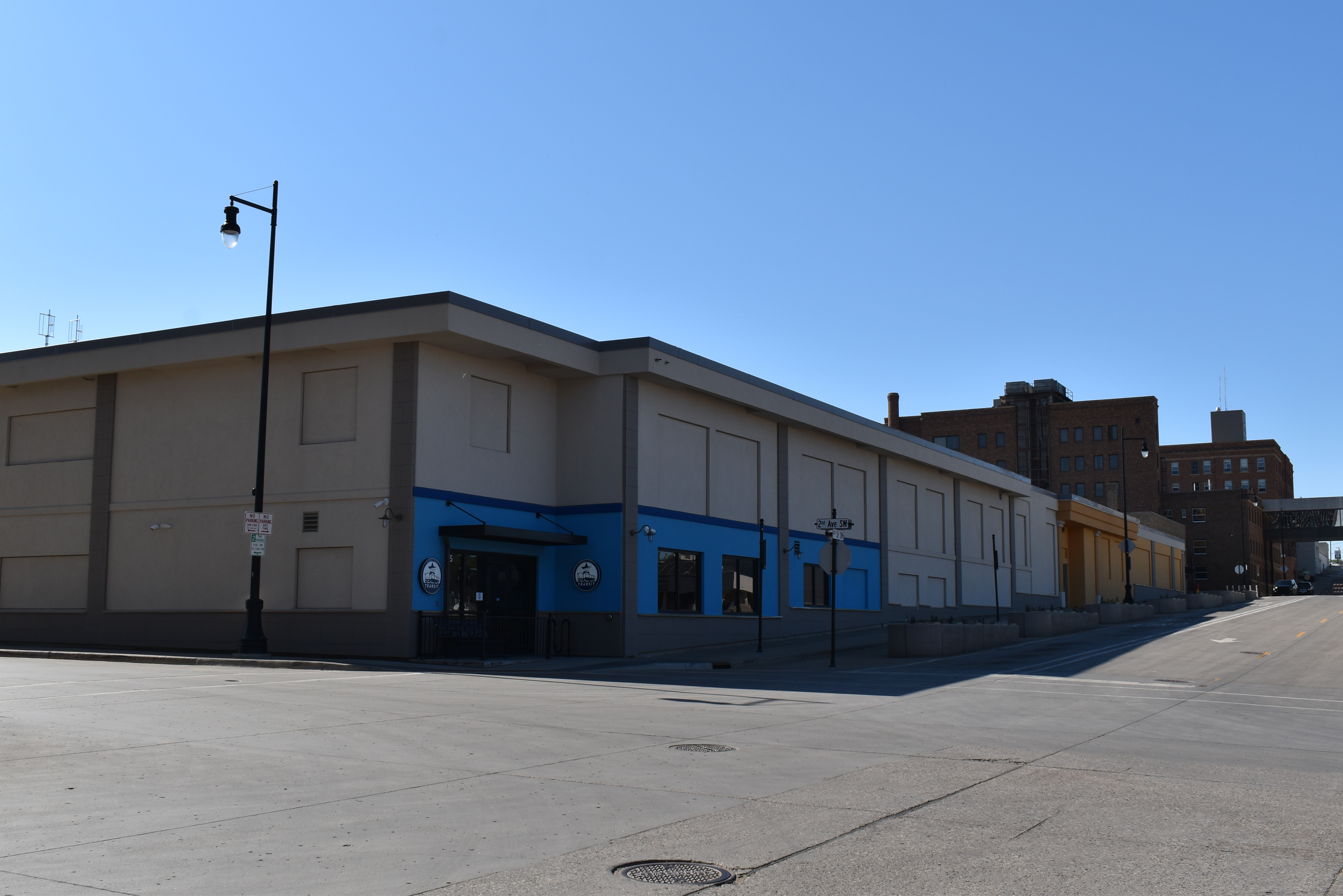
- The Minot Transit Center
- Founded: 70s
- Headquarters: 515 2nd Avenue SW, Minot, ND
- Service area: Minot, ND
- Service type: Bus, Paratransit
- Routes: 8
- Stops: 6
- Hubs: Minot Municipal Auditorium (Transfer Hub)
- Stations: 1
- Fleet: 6
- Fuel type: Diesel

Minot City Transit, is the public transit agency operated in Minot, North Dakota, It operates fixed-route bus routes in the city.

Minot began running public transportation sometime in the 1970s with buses branded as "City Bus". The original fleet consisted of a number of 1977 AM General Metropolitan buses that had a Blue, White, and Green branding.

A 1977 built Minot City Transit bus, constructed by the American Motors General Metropolitan and modeled after a Canadian bus, was donated to the Midwest Bus Museum in 2021.

== Transit service ==
Standard fixed-route transit service is provided on six routes, with three routes departing half-hourly from the central stop at Minot City Auditorium. Hours of operation are from 7:00 am to 7:00 pm. Buses operate on a flag-down system, meaning that bus will stop at any street corner when waved down by a rider. There is currently no Saturday or Sunday service. The only holidays that service is provided are Martin Luther King Jr. Day, Good Friday, Columbus Day, and President's Day. There is no bus service on any other federal holiday.

- North - The North Route serves Central, Northwest, and Northeast portions of North Hill north of the airport and the north leg of Broadway.
- Northwest - The Northwest Route serves Northwest portions of North Hill and the Northwest Quadrant of the city.
- North Central - The North Central Route serves Central portions North Hill, east portions in The Valley, and Downtown
- West - The West Route serves Central and West portions of The Valley and Downtown
- East - The East Route serves East Minot and Downtown
- South - The South Route serves Central and Southwest portions of South Hill and the south leg of Broadway
- South East - The South East Route serves Southeast portions of South Hill
- South West - The South West Route serves Southwest portions of South Hill and the Trinity Hospital area

== Ridership ==
The ridership and service statistics shown here are of fixed route services only and do not include demand response.

	Ridership	Change
2014	131,640	n/a
2015	124,256	▼5.61%
2016	98,111	▼21.04%
2017	87,100	▼11.22%
2018	87,361	▲0.3%
2019	94,738	▲8.44%
2020	73,203	▼22.73%
2021	49,357	▼32.58%

== See also ==
- Minot station
- Bis-Man Transit
- Cities Area Transit
