= Mass media in Minot, North Dakota =

The following is a list of media in Minot, North Dakota, United States:

Minot has several media outlets but little local content. Aside from some local news programming, virtually no mass media content originates from Minot. The local media tends to rebroadcast Bismarck television stations and republish network and wire reports rather than maintain a strong local focus.

== Radio ==
Minot has 15 radio stations (12 FM, 3 AM). Bottineau-based Programmers Broadcasting owns KTZU and KWGO, along with KBTO of Bottineau. North Dakota Public Radio operates a full power FM station, a community broadcaster based in nearby Burlington, ND operates a low-power FM station, and the remainder are nonprofit Christian stations, of which only KHRT is based locally.

Clear Channel Communications owns the rest. In May 2007 it was announced that Clear Channel sold the Minot group to Dean Goodman's GoodRadio, LLC. It was confirmed on May 16, 2007 by filings made public with the FCC. Then in the next couple of months, GoodRadio's plans fell through when its financing group, American Securities Capital Partners, objected to the deal's $452 million cost.

=== AM band ===
- 910 KCJB - "91 Country" Country/Talk
- 1390 KRRZ - "Cars" Classic Hits

=== FM band ===
- 88.9 KMPR - Prairie Public
- 91.1 K220GC - HBN Radio Christian
- 91.9 K220GC - Air1 Christian
- 93.7 KIZZ - "Z94" CHR/Top 40
- 94.9 KTZU - "The Zoo" Classic rock
- 97.1 KYYX - "97 Kicks" Country
- 98.1 KOWW-LP - "The Cowlip" eclectic community broadcaster
- 99.9 KMXA-FM - "Mix 99.9" AC
- 100.7 KNDL - K-Love Christian
- 102.9 KWGO - "W-G-O" Country
- 104.1 KSAF-LP - 3ABN Radio Christian
- 105.3 KZPR - "The Fox" Active Rock
- 106.9 KHTZ - "K-Hits 106" Classic Hits

=== Other stations ===
Additionally, the following stations are not based in Minot but generally have a clear signal into town:

- 550 AM KFYR - "K-Fire" from Bismarck (News/Talk/Sports)
- 710 AM KXMR - "The Fan" also from Bismarck (Sports)
- 1410 AM KDKT - "Fox Sports Radio 1410" also from Bismarck (Sports)
- 101.9 FM KBTO - "Sunny 101.9" from Bottineau (Country)

== Television ==
=== Over the air ===
Minot has six television stations, most of which have ATSC (digital) transmitters:

- 6 KSRE - Prairie Public Television (PBS) (ATSC 15)
- 10 KMOT - NBC
- 13 KXMC - CBS
- 14 KMCY - ABC
- 21 K21GQ - The Church Channel
- 24 KNDM - Fox

=== Cable television ===
Midcontinent Communications provides cable service to the city of Minot and Minot Air Force Base. Souris River Telecommunications provides cable service to other nearby communities.

=== Print ===
The principal local newspaper is the Minot Daily News, which publishes seven days a week. The Minot State University student newspaper The Red & Green is published once a week (Thursdays) during the regular school year, but not during the summer months. Morgan Printing produces the Lunch Letter three days a week on a double-sided leaflet. There are also two weekly classified-ad publications, the Trading Post, printed by the Daily News, and The Finder, printed by the Bismarck Tribune. The Bismarck Tribune is available at several outlets in the city, as is The Forum, to a lesser extent.

=== Local news ===
KXMC-TV, KMOT-TV, and the Minot Daily News report on local news daily. KCJB-AM, KHRT-AM, and Prairie Public have some local news content, but no active journalists. Other local sources include "Minot Trending Topics News" and podcasters at "The Dakotan".

== See also ==
- List of television stations in North Dakota
