= Burlington, North Dakota =

- City
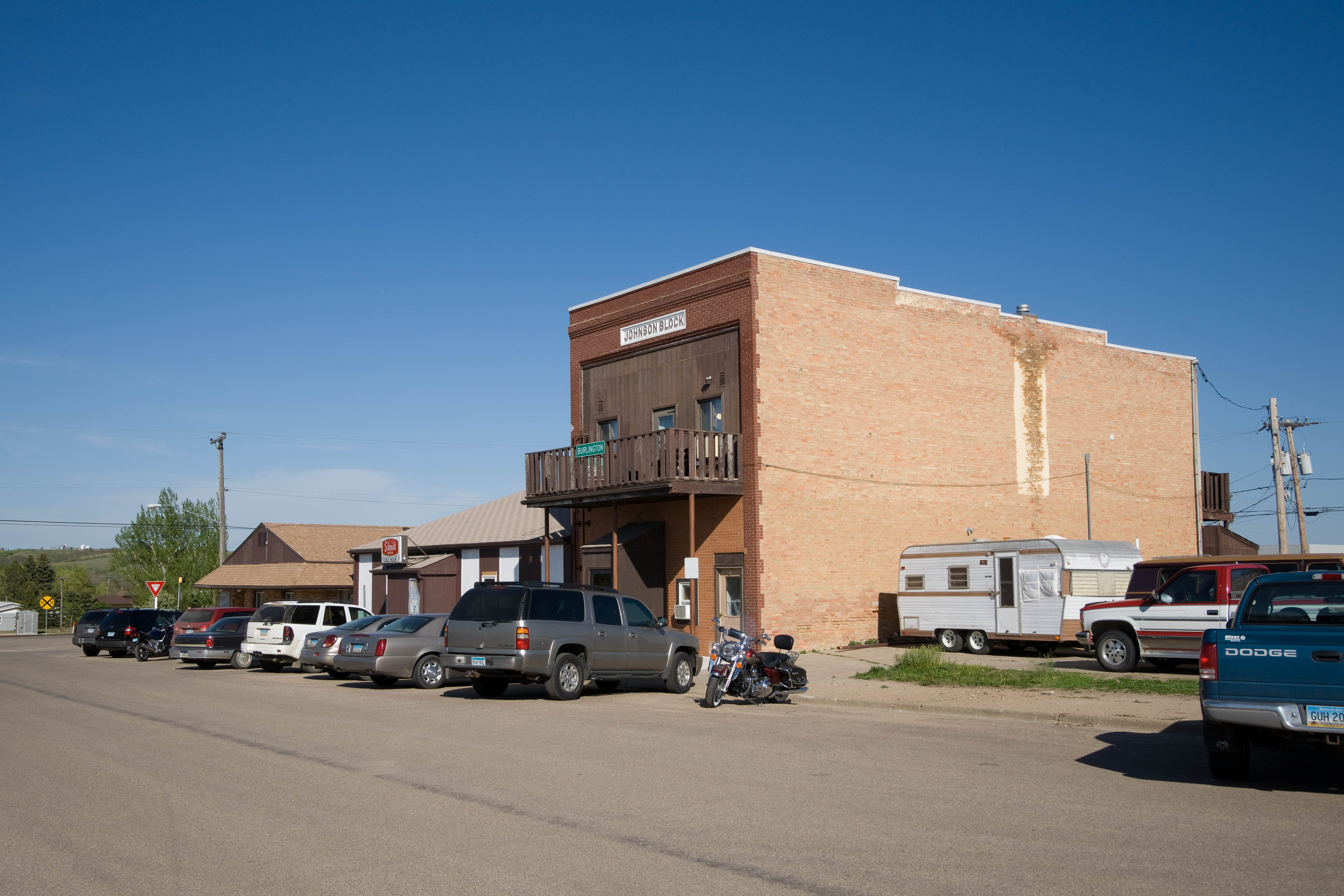
- 136 Colton Avenue in 2009
- Nickname: The Forks
- Location of Burlington, North Dakota
- Coordinates: 48°16′35″N 101°25′35″W
- Country: United States
- State: North Dakota
- County: Ward
- Township: Burlington
- Township: Kirkelie
- Founded: 1883
- Incorporated: February 28, 1884

Government
  - Mayor: Jack Anderson

Area
  - Total: 1.91 sq mi (4.94 km^{2})
  - Land: 1.91 sq mi (4.94 km^{2})
  - Water: 0 sq mi (0.00 km^{2})
- Elevation: 1,660 ft (506 m)

Population (2020)
  - Total: 1,291
  - Estimate (2022): 1,294
  - Density: 677.5/sq mi (261.58/km^{2})
- Time zone: UTC-6 (Central (CST))
  - Summer (DST): UTC-5 (CDT)
- ZIP code: 58722
- Area code: 701
- FIPS code: 38-10940
- GNIS feature ID: 1035947
- Highways: US 2, US 52
- Website: www.burlingtonnd.org

Burlington is a city in Ward County, North Dakota, United States. It was founded in 1883, the third in a series that included two earlier settlements. Despite this, Burlington is still the oldest city in Ward County, as well as north-western and north central North Dakota. On February 28, 1884, as it was the only city in the then-newly formed Imperial Ward County (now split into Ward, Renville, Mountrail, and Burke counties), it was made the county seat, a position it held until 1888. The population was 1,291 at the 2020 census. Burlington is part of the Minot metropolitan area.

== History ==
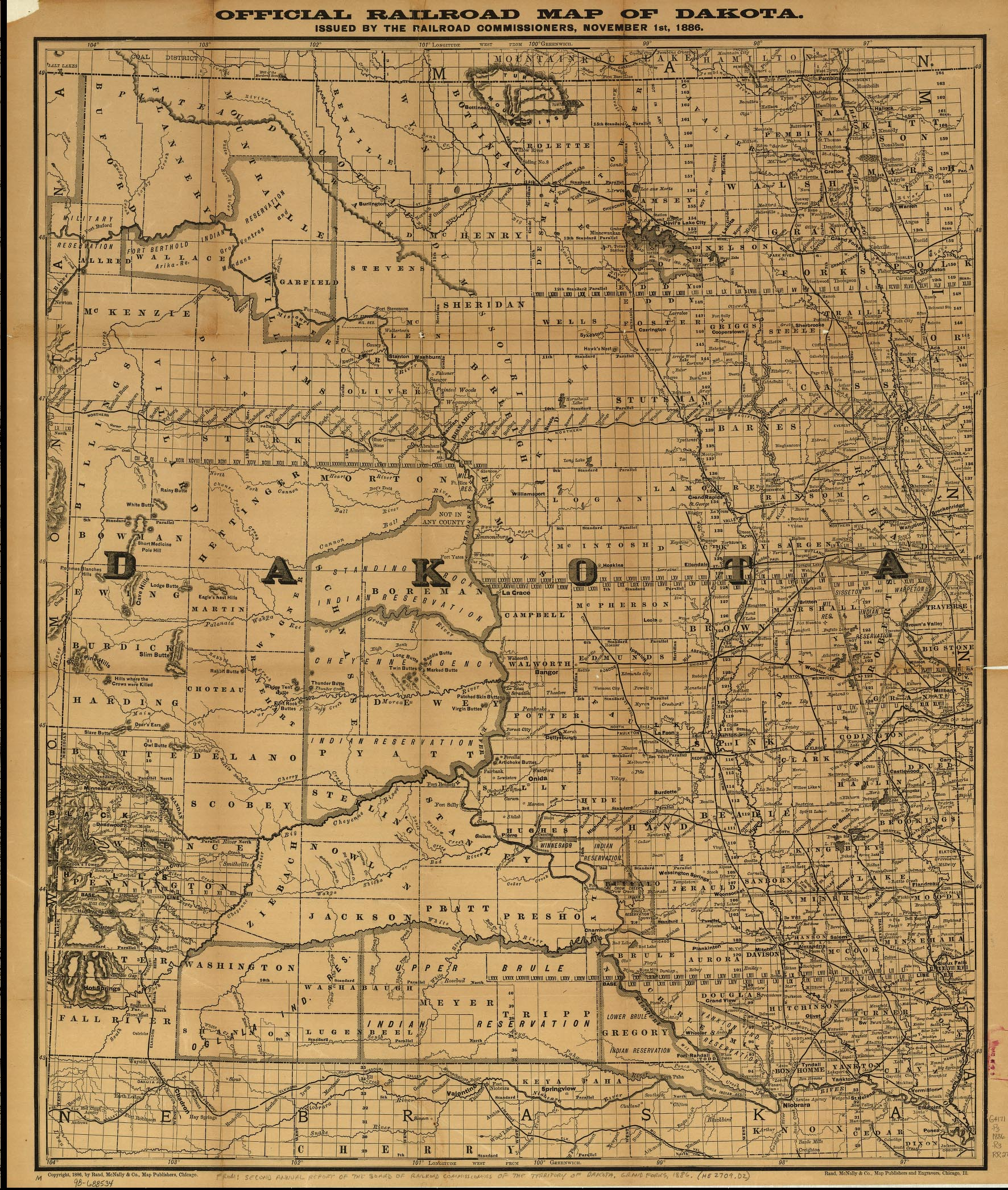
Cartograph c. 1886, showing Burlington as the largest settlement in NW Dakota Territory.

Burlington and its former settlements were founded by James Johnson and James Colton (the men who also settled Larimore, North Dakota) in Dakota Territory in the late 1870s. Earlier settlements were The Forks, and later Colton (named after James Colton), which are considered forerunners of the city. Its current name was given to it by Johnson during the creation of the post office, and was the name of his hometown of Burlington, Iowa. "The Forks" was used as a name for Burlington, alluding to its geographic location at the confluence of the Des Lacs and Mouse Rivers.

In the early 1890s, the Burlington Reporter became the first newspaper in western North Dakota. It would in the future be renamed to the Minot Daily News.

In 1997, Raymond Kuntz from Burlington testified before the United States Senate that he believed his son, Richard, committed suicide due to the influence of the band Marilyn Manson.

On January 18, 2002, a severe train derailment east of the city sent a gigantic cloud of anhydrous ammonia toward Minot and Burlington. Power to Burlington, Des Lacs, and Berthold was knocked out due to damage to poles near the derailment site. The power company serving these towns built a temporary connection to a neighboring electric cooperative's system to provide limited power until the site was sufficiently cleaned up to permit permanent repairs to be completed. Residents were unable to access radios or televisions due to this, although messages went out advising people to stay inside. One man died and many of the area's citizens were sickened by the noxious gas. The incident was one of the more major chemical spills in the country. In early 2006, court cases were heard in Minneapolis, Minnesota, against Canadian Pacific Railway, the owner and operator of the derailed train. The anhydrous ammonia spill was the largest such spill in U.S. history. This incident was used by Eric Klinenberg in his book Fighting for Air: The Battle to Control America's Media as an example of the failure of mass media, specifically local radio stations, to disseminate information to the public in an emergency.

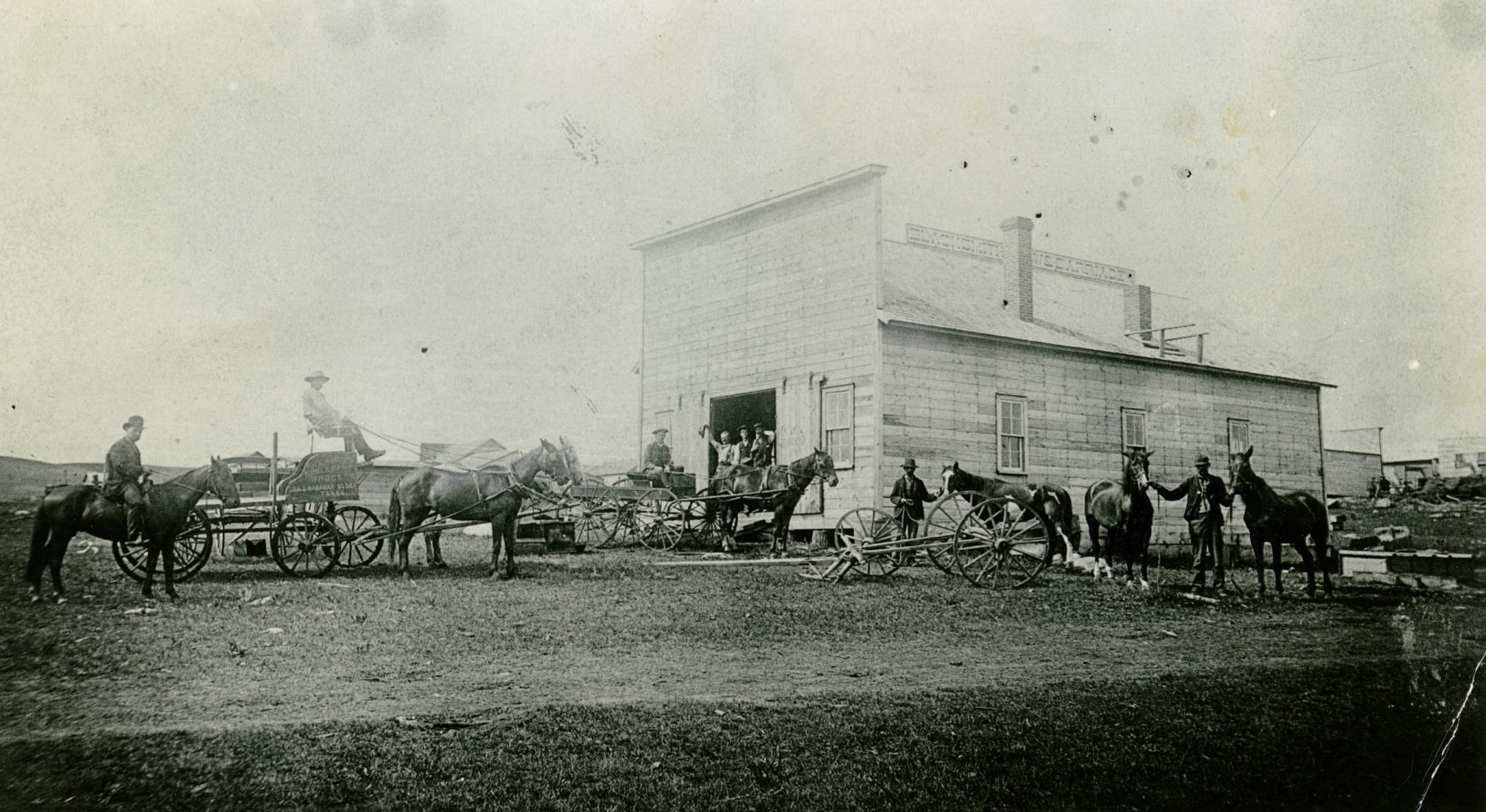
Blacksmith shop in Burlington, North Dakota, 1880

On June 24, 2011, 80% of the city was evacuated when floodwaters swept through the town during the flooding of the Mouse River, in flooding which also greatly affected Minot. In some cases, many homes were not accessible for months afterward, and some damage to homes and infrastructure still wasn't fully repaired as of 2016. Post-flood, most of the homes that were directly next to the Mouse River (and some next to the Des Lacs) were demolished as part of a new flood control plan.

== Geography ==
Burlington is located on the Drift Prairie of north central North Dakota directly next to the confluence of the Des Lacs and the Mouse Rivers, in Burlington Township, North Dakota, and Kirkelie Township, North Dakota. According to the United States Census Bureau, the city has a total area of 0.64 square miles (1.66 km^{2}), all land.

=== Climate ===
This climatic region is typified by large seasonal temperature differences, with warm to hot (and often humid) summers and cold (sometimes severely cold) winters. According to the Köppen Climate Classification system, Burlington has a humid continental climate, abbreviated "Dfb" on climate maps.

== Demographics ==
Historical population
Census	Pop.	Note	%±
1920	300		—
1930	270		−10.0%
1940	200		−25.9%
1950	200		0.0%
1960	262		31.0%
1970	247		−5.7%
1980	762		208.5%
1990	995		30.6%
2000	1,096		10.2%
2010	1,060		−3.3%
2020	1,291		21.8%
2022 (est.)	1,294		0.2%
U.S. Decennial Census; 2020 Census

=== 2010 census ===
As of the census of 2010, there were 1,060 people, 399 households, and 293 families residing in the city. The population density was 1,656.3 inhabitants per square mile (639.5/km^{2}). There were 410 housing units at an average density of 640.6 per square mile (247.3/km^{2}). The racial makeup of the city was 94.2% White, 0.1% African American, 2.7% Native American, 0.2% Asian, 0.8% from other races, and 2.1% from two or more races. Hispanic or Latino of any race were 2.1% of the population.

There were 399 households, of which 40.4% had children under the age of 18 living with them, 57.9% were married couples living together, 10.3% had a female householder with no husband present, 5.3% had a male householder with no wife present, and 26.6% were non-families. 21.6% of all households were made up of individuals, and 8.3% had someone living alone who was 65 years of age or older. The average household size was 2.66 and the average family size was 3.11.

The median age in the city was 33 years. 28.8% of residents were under the age of 18; 8.3% were between the ages of 18 and 24; 27.4% were from 25 to 44; 27.6% were from 45 to 64; and 7.8% were 65 years of age or older. The gender makeup of the city was 49.2% male and 50.8% female.

=== 2000 census ===
As of the census of 2000, there were 1,096 people, 369 households, and 298 families residing in the city. The population density was 1,737.5 inhabitants per square mile (670.9/km^{2}). There were 388 housing units at an average density of 615.1 per square mile (237.5/km^{2}). The racial makeup of the city was 96.08% White, 0.55% African American, 2.01% Native American, 0.18% Asian, and 1.19% from two or more races. Hispanic or Latino of any race were 0.91% of the population.

The top 6 ancestry groups in the city are German (48.8%), Norwegian (32.3%), Irish (7.5%), Swedish (4.9%), English (4.7%), French (3.6%).

There were 369 households, out of which 51.8% had children under the age of 18 living with them, 65.6% were married couples living together, 11.7% had a female householder with no husband present, and 19.2% were non-families. 14.6% of all households were made up of individuals, and 4.3% had someone living alone who was 65 years of age or older. The average household size was 2.97 and the average family size was 3.27.

In the city, the population was spread out, with 35.9% under the age of 18, 7.4% from 18 to 24, 33.7% from 25 to 44, 16.9% from 45 to 64, and 6.2% who were 65 years of age or older. The median age was 31 years. For every 100 females, there were 93.6 males. For every 100 females age 18 and over, there were 93.7 males.

The median income for a household in the city was $40,078, and the median income for a family was $42,639. Males had a median income of $24,922 versus $19,179 for females. The per capita income for the city was $14,250. About 2.7% of families and 3.7% of the population were below the poverty line, including 3.0% of those under age 18 and 9.4% of those age 65 or over.

== Education ==
Burlington's school district merged with Des Lacs' school district in the late 1960s to form United Public School District 7, thus Des Lacs-Burlington High School now serves students living in Burlington. This means that it has since shared a school system with nearby Des Lacs. Children in grades kindergarten through sixth attend school in Burlington, while those in seventh through twelve attend high school in Des Lacs. Before 2000, there was a lack of room for the possibility of the seventh and eighth grades being located in Burlington, as the room needed for those grades was not completed until that year in the form of a new junior high wing. Des Lacs-Burlington Elementary School had approximately 500 enrolled students as of the 2008 school year.

== Culture ==
=== Sports ===
==== Championships ====
- ND Region 16 Legion baseball (as "Burlington Bulldogs"): 2007

==== Runner-up ====
- State women's softball (as "Burlington"): 1946, 1947, 1948

==== National championships ====
- Central Plains Super-Region baseball (as "Burlington Bulldogs") : 2007

== Media ==
=== Radio ===
AM

- 910 KCJB – "91 Country" (classic country/talk)
- 1320 KHRT – "K-Heart" (gospel music)
- 1390 KRRZ – "Cars" (oldies)

FM

- 88.9 KMPR – Prairie Public Radio (incl. NPR, PRI, APR)
- 91.1 HBN Radio (Christian)
- 91.9 K-LOVE (Christian)
- 93.7 KIZZ – "Z94" (Top 40)
- 94.9 KTZU – "The Zoo" (classic rock)
- 97.1 KYYX – "97 Kicks" (country)
- 98.1 KOWW-LP – "The Cowlip" (eclectic community broadcaster) (tower also in Burlington)
- 99.9 KMXA-FM – "Mix 99.9" (adult contemporary)
- 102.9 KWGO – "W-G-O" (adult contemporary) (tower also in Burlington)
- 104.1 KSAF-LP – (Christian)
- 105.3 KZPR – "The Fox" (mainstream rock)
- 106.9 KHRT – "K-Heart" (Christian)

== Transportation ==
- U.S. Route 2
- U.S. Route 52

=== Railroads ===
The railroads remain in Burlington today, and are becoming more important to the local oil and gravel industries, though Great Northern is now part of the BNSF Railway and the Soo Line is run by the Canadian Pacific Railway.

=== Airports ===
There are three private airstrips and landing strips within a three-mile radius of Burlington. One, Pietschtree airstrip, is located directly next to Burlington to the north. Otherwise, major aerial transportation is through Minot International Airport.

== Sites of interest ==
- Burlington Recreational Park
- Burlington Walking Path, which starts on U.S. routes 2 and 52 and goes on for more than eight miles until finally connecting with Minot
- Minot Country Club
- Old Settlers Park & Campground
- Peace Lutheran Church & Burlington Cemetery
- Wildwood Golf Course

=== Pioneer Village Museum relocation ===
One of the first buildings in Burlington was the first Ward County Courthouse, built by James Johnson, and was used originally as a granary. It was moved to the North Dakota State Fair fairgrounds in the mid-20th century and served as one of the three buildings of the Ward County Historical Society's Pioneer Village Museum. In 2019, the Ward County Historical Society announced that the building was to be moved back to Burlington along with the entirety of Pioneer Village Museum due to legal issues with the State Fair Association. The other two buildings, the Immanuel Lutheran Church and the Sundre Log Cabin, will also be moved.
