= KHRT (disambiguation) =

KHRT may refer to:

- KHRT (AM), a radio station (1320 AM) licensed to Minot, North Dakota, United States
- KHRT-FM, a radio station (106.9 FM) licensed to Minot, North Dakota, United States
- The ICAO code for Hurlburt Field, an airbase in Mary Esther, Florida, United States
