= KHTZ =

KHTZ may refer to:

- Kharkiv Tractor Plant (KhTZ)
- KEON, a radio station (94.9 FM) licensed to serve Ganado, Texas, United States, which held the call sign KHTZ from 2008 to 2019 and in 2022
- KZHC-FM, a radio station (92.7 FM) licensed to serve Burns, Oregon, United States, which briefly held the call letters KHTZ in 2019
- KNX-FM, a radio station (97.1 FM) licensed to serve Los Angeles, California, United States, which held the call letters KHTZ from 1978 to 1985
- KHTZ-FM, a radio station (106.9 FM) based in Minot, North Dakota
