= Polaris Park =

Coordinates: 48°15′53″N 101°18′09″W

Polaris Park is a park and surrounding residential neighborhood on North Hill in Minot, North Dakota. The neighborhood is roughly bounded by 30th Ave NW, Frontage Road, 24th Ave NW and 8th St NW. The park, which is owned by the Minot Park District, is home to a 9-hole disc golf course, an outdoor ice rink, tennis courts, a picnic shelter and a baseball field. The Polaris Park neighborhood is home to a number of single family homes and apartment complexes north and east of the park. Frontage Road in Polaris Park is home to a few businesses, including MLT Vacations, North Hill's second largest employer.
