= North Hill, Minot =

North Hill
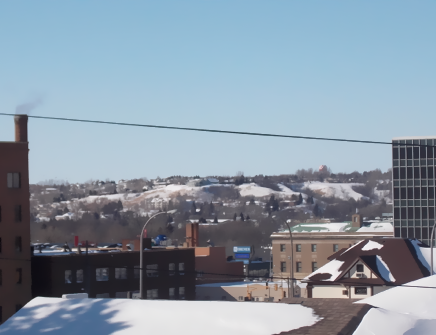
- North Hill from Downtown Minot
- Interactive map of North Hill
- Coordinates: 48.258°N 101.296°W
- Country: United States
- State: North Dakota
- County: Ward County
- City: Minot
- Subdistricts of North Hill: List: • Ridgedale Industrial Park; • Northern Plaines Energy Park; • Airport Industrial Park; • Stonebridge Farms; • Prairie Wynd; • Statesboro; • Idlewild; • Ballantyne; • Northern View; • Tollberg Shores; • Northern Lights; • Pheasant Run; • Lake Side; • Highlands at North Hill; • Prairie view Estates; • Terrace Heights; • Crestview; • Marian Heights; • California Ranchos; • University Heights; • Glacial Point; • Polaris Park; • Highland Acres; • Eagles Landing; • Bolton Heights; • Country Club Manor

Government
  - Minot City Council: Bob Miller, George Withus, Dean Frantsvog, Jim Hatlelid, Amy Moen, Milton Miller
  - State Assembly: Robert Frantsvog (R), Matthew M. Klein (R), Larry Bellew (R), Dan Ruby (R), Roscoe Streyle (R), Andrew G. Maragos (R)
  - State Senate: David Hogue (R), Karen K. Krebsbach (R), Oley Larsen (R)
  - U.S. House: Kevin Cramer (R)

Area
  - Total: 6.15 sq mi (15.93 km^{2})
- Highest elevation: 1,768 ft (539 m)
- Lowest elevation: 1,686 ft (514 m)
- ZIP codes: 58703
- Area code: 701

North Hill is a neighborhood in Minot, North Dakota, one of three major areas of the city, others being The Valley and South Hill, It is located north of the Souris River, above the Souris River Valley. It is a primarily residential neighborhood, though there are industries and businesses in the area, primarily along North Broadway and 21st Ave NW. North Hill is also home to Minot International Airport.

== Geography ==
North Hill is located north of The Valley. The neighborhood is bound by The Valley to the south and the city limits on the west, north and east. The major streets through North Hill include North Broadway, 21st Avenue NW, and 16th Street NW. All the streets in Minot are gridded, based on the intersection of Central Avenue and Main Street downtown. All of the roads in North Hill are roughly north of 11th Avenue NW. Main Street in North Hill divides streets east and west. Main Street, however, only exists in sections on North Hill, due to area restrictions and the airport. North Hill can most easily be accessed via the West Bypass, the Northeast Bypass, or North Broadway.

== Economy ==
=== Top employers ===
The top employers on North Hill, according to the Minot Area Chamber EDC in March 2023:

#	Employer	# of Employees
1	Minot Public Schools	1047
2	City of Minot	437
4	Delta Vacations	367
3	SRT Communications	218

== Attractions ==
- Dakota Territory Air Museum
- Magic City Discovery Center

== Parks and recreation ==
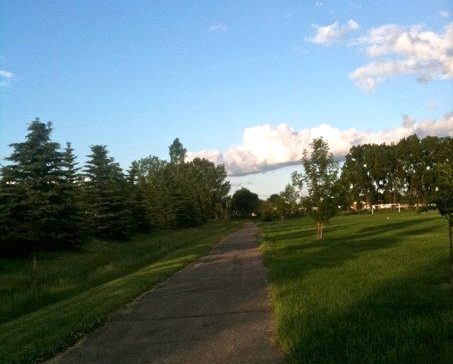
Optimist Park

- Optimist Park
- Polaris Park
- Pheasant Run Community Trails
- Sertoma Softball Complex
- Stonebridge Farms Community Playground

== Education ==
Erik Ramstad Middle School, was formerly located on Lincoln Avenue in the Souris River Valley, but was badly flooded in the Souris River flood in 2011. The school named for one of the founders of Minot, Erik Ramstad was rebuilt on North Hill. In the fall of 2011, students at Ramstad Middle School began attending classes at the Minot Municipal Auditorium downtown. Temporary classroom units on the property were also needed to accommodate students. On August 23, 2012, a groundbreaking ceremony for the new school was held in North Hill for the $35 million school Erik Ramstad Middle School is the only middle school on North Hill, as Jim Hill Middle School is located on South Hill and Memorial Middle School is located at the Minot Air Force Base.

Lewis & Clark Elementary School is the only elementary school on North Hill, It was built roughly in the 60s and was formerly named “North Hill Elementary School” but was later changed.

Minot North High School is also located on North Hill in the former Cognizant site and is projected to open in fall 2024. It will be Minot’s second high school. The Mouzafarov Institute of Dance and Ballet Theatre is also located on North Hill.

== Transportation ==
The main roads through North Hill are the US 83 Bypass, the Northeast Bypass, 16th Street NE and Broadway. Broadway follows US 83 through the entire length of the city.

=== Minot International Airport ===
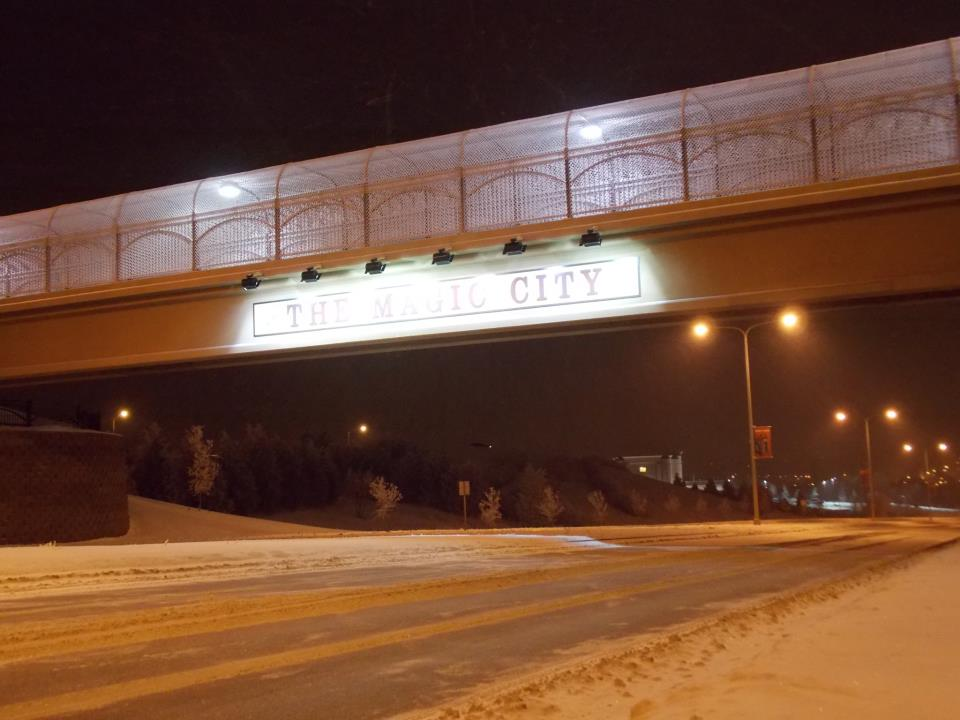
Magic City Bridge

North Hill is home to Minot International Airport, the third busiest airport in the state, behind Bismarck Municipal Airport in Bismarck. In 2022, the airport had over 137,000 boardings, The airport is served by Allegiant, Delta, and United, which fly to Denver, Las Vegas, Minneapolis and Phoenix. The Magic City pedestrian bridge also connects the airport with the Grand Hotel and the west side of North Broadway.

=== MCT ===
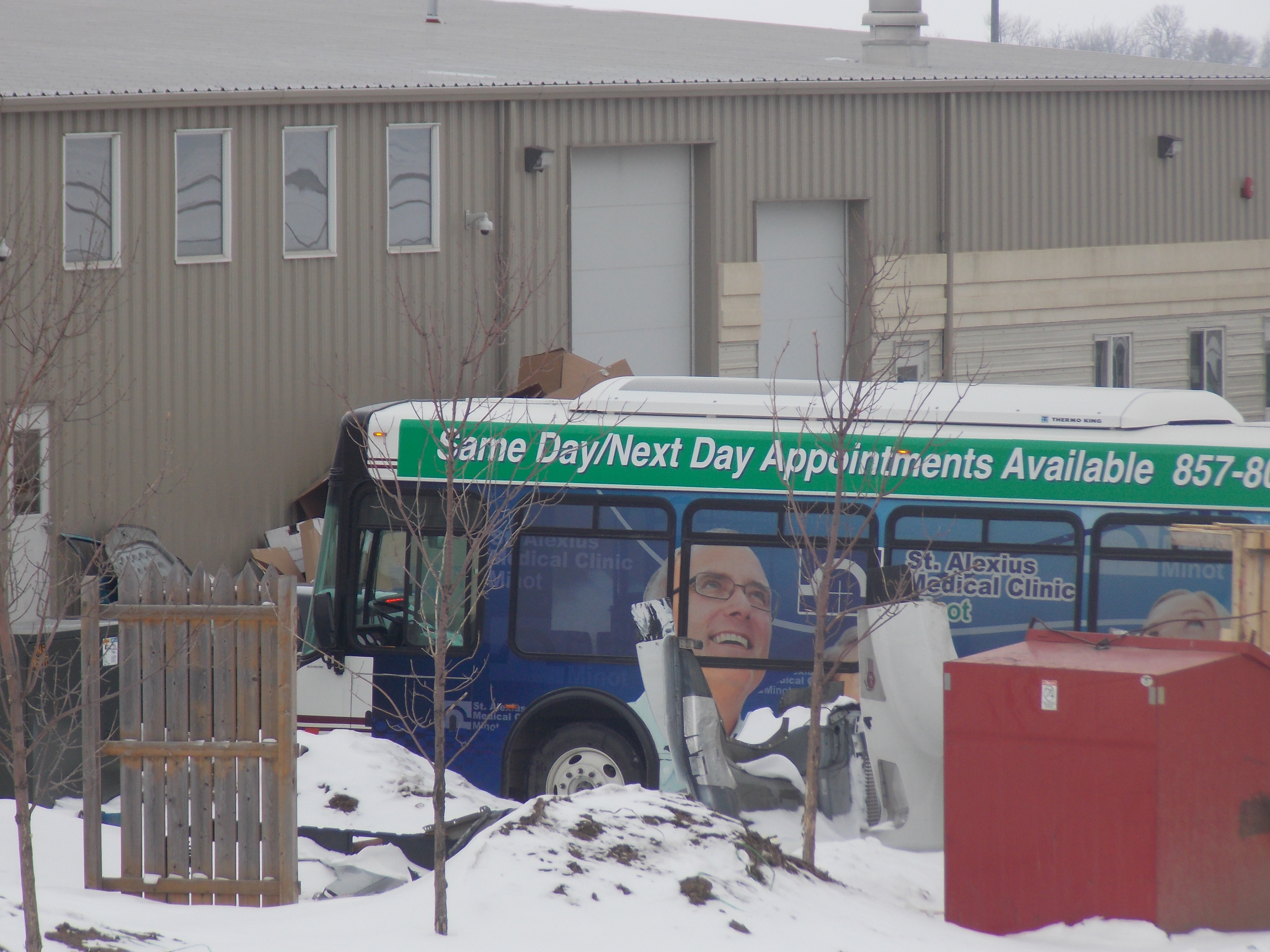
Minot city bus

Minot City Transit has 2 routes that serve several communities on North Hill with a 3rd route extension planned for the service.

Routes that serve North Hill:

Northwest - The Northwest route serves the central and west portions of North Hill. The route serves the areas of Downtown, Upper Brooklyn, University Heights, Glacial Point, Highlands at North Hill, Terrace Heights, and Lakeview.

North Central - The North Central route serves the central and southeast portions of North Hill. The route serves the areas of Downtown, Upper Brooklyn, University Heights, Glacial Point, Polaris Park, and western portions of Lakeview.

== Future development ==
Minot 2040 recognizes two growth areas in the area, Northwest Growth Area & Extraterritorial Growth Area.

Minot North High School is located on the former Cognizant site, it is projected to open Fall 2024. It is expected that the opening of the school will reel in more development opportunities for North Hill.

== Events ==
- Soaring over the Souris air show, July

== Emergency Services ==
=== Hospital ===
St. Alexius Medical Clinic is located at 21st Ave NW

Trinity Health is located at 37th Ave SW
