= Minot Park District =

Park district in North Dakota, United States

Coordinates: 48°13′57″N 101°17′45″W

The Minot Park District is the unit of the Minot, North Dakota municipal government responsible for maintaining city parks. The District is managed by a board of five directors elected by city voters to four year terms.

The district also serves as the local forestry service, trimming and planting trees across the city. Through its efforts, Minot became a Tree City USA in 1992.

== Parks ==
11th & 11th Park
Green Valley Park
Hammond Park
Jefferson Park
Leach Park
Milla Vista Park
Moose Park
Nubbin Park
Oak Park

Second largest park in the city, located in a dense thicket of Oak trees.

Polaris Park
Radio City Park
Riverside Park
Roosevelt Park:

Minot's largest park, adjacent to a zoo.

Rosey Park
Shirley Bicentennial Park, commonly known as the Scandinavian Heritage Park.

Includes a stave church and the Minot Convention and Visitors Bureau.

Sunnyside Park
Via View

== Other facilities ==
Corbett Field (baseball stadium)
MAYSA Arena (ice rinks)
Optimist Soccer Complex
Souris Valley Golf Course
