= Mark Friese =

American judge (born 1969)

Justice of the North Dakota Supreme Court
- Incumbent
- Assumed office March 9, 2026
- Appointed by: Kelly Armstrong
- Preceded by: Daniel J. Crothers

Personal details
- Born: 1969 (age 56–57) Minot, North Dakota, U.S.
- Education: Bismarck State College (AA); University of Mary (BS); University of North Dakota (JD)

Mark A. Friese (born 1969) is an American judge. He has served as a justice of the North Dakota Supreme Court since 2026.

== Life and career ==
Friese was born in Minot, North Dakota. He attended Bismarck Century High School, graduating in 1988. After graduating, he attended Bismarck State College, earning his AA degree in criminal justice in 1990. He also attended the University of Mary, earning his BS degree in 1995, and earned his JD degree at the University of North Dakota School of Law in 2000. After earning his degree, he served as a law clerk of the North Dakota Supreme Court from 2000 to 2001, and served in the North Dakota Army National Guard until 2011, retiring at the rank of lieutenant colonel. He worked as a criminal defense attorney in Fargo, North Dakota.

Friese has served as a justice of the North Dakota Supreme Court since 2026. He was appointed by Governor Kelly Armstrong, and he succeeded Daniel J. Crothers.

Legal offices
Preceded by Daniel J. Crothers	Justice of the North Dakota Supreme Court; 2026–present	Incumbent
