= Roosevelt Park (Minot) =

Park in Minot, North Dakota, United States

Coordinates: 48.235665°N 101.276264°W

Roosevelt Park is a park in Minot, North Dakota operated by the Minot Park District. It is the largest park in the city of Minot. The park is named after Theodore Roosevelt, former president of the United States, who is honoured by a large statue in the middle of the park.

Roosevelt Park contains hiking and biking trails, tennis courts, a skate park, a swimming pool and water slide, a band shelter, and picnic shelters. It is also the location of the Magic City Express 2/5 scale passenger train.

The park is located along the Souris River between Eastwood Estates and the separately managed Roosevelt Park Zoo. Burdick Expressway runs along the south end of the park.
