= Roosevelt Park Zoo =

Zoo in Minot, North Dakota

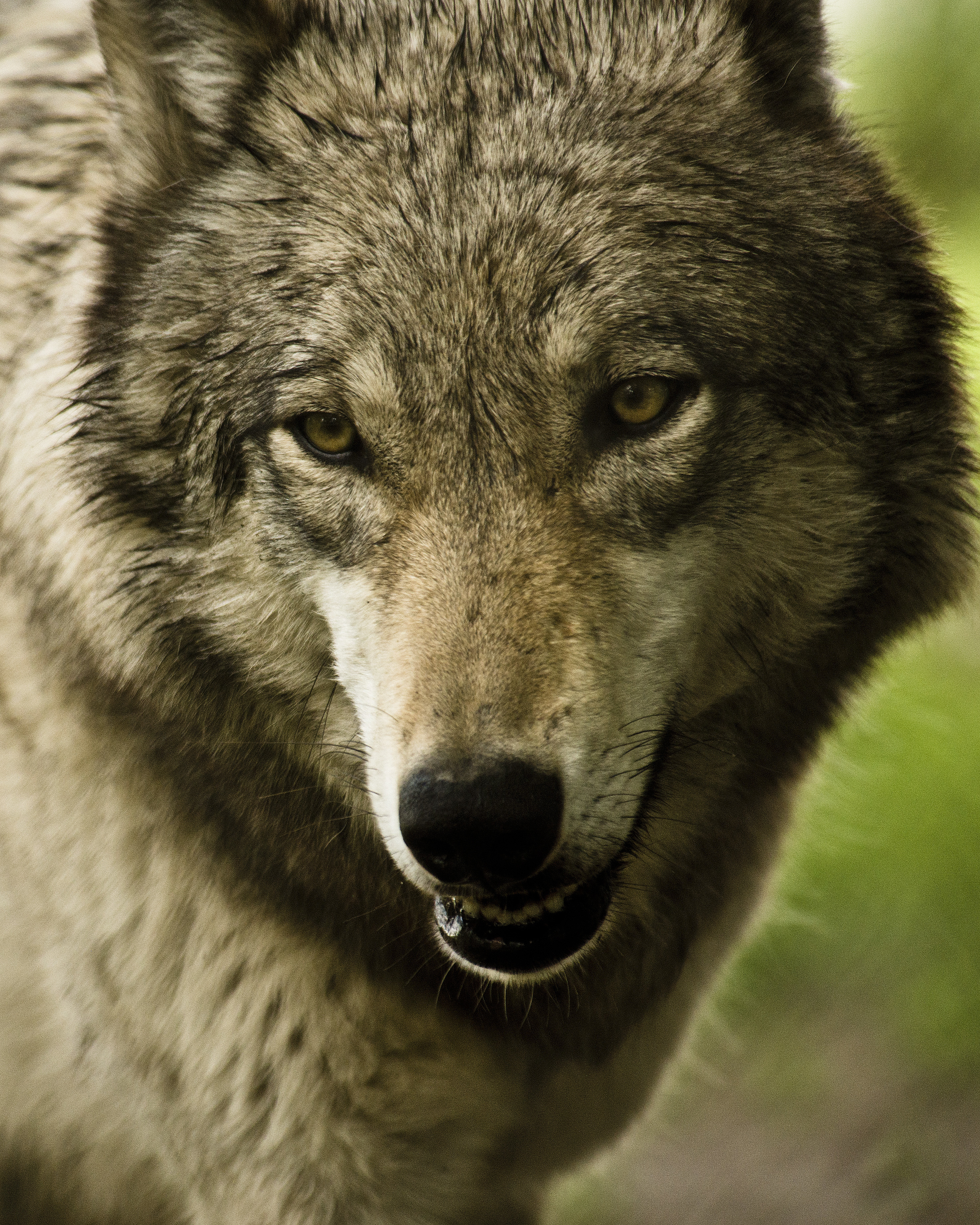
- Interactive map of Roosevelt Park Zoo
- 48°14′3″N 101°16′23″W
- Date opened: 1921
- Location: Minot, North Dakota, United States
- Land area: 19 acres (7.7 ha)
- No. of animals: 160
- No. of species: 68
- Memberships: AZA
- Public transit: Minot City Transit
- Website: RPZoo.com

The Roosevelt Park Zoo is a zoo in Minot, North Dakota. It is the oldest zoo in North Dakota.

As of 2024 the park has 135 animals from 68 species. In 2021 115,805 guests have visited the park.

== History ==
Riverside Park Zoo opened in 1914, it was created by the Minot park district at a meeting on April 9. When it was founded it had 24 animals, 12 red squirrels and 12 grey squirrels. The zoo received its first large animal, a single male bison in 1921. At this time the entire zoo was housed in the zoological building, which is now the aviary. In 1922 after the death of Teddy Roosevelt the park and zoo were renamed Roosevelt Park Zoo. In 1927 the zoo purchased two lions, "King" and "Queen" from the Longfellow Zoological Gardens in Minneapolis. In 1932 a lioness with two of her cubs temporarily escaped her cage and was found on the zoo grounds.In 1932 the zoo was forced with the decision to kill six of the fifteen lions in their care as they were "unable to sell them at any price". A young lion named "Maggie" died after being poisoned by someone who fed her strychnine in 1936. Thousands visited the zoo to see a newborn buffalo calf in 1940.

By the 1940s the zoo housed deer, bison, elk, lions, cougars, black bear, rhesus monkeys, llama, coyotes, various rodents, and waterfowl.

In 1969 the Souris River flooded forcing all resident animals to be temporarily relocated. In the next 40 years more animals were added and habitats were renovated. The park in 2001 consists of 20 acres, and houses over 200 animals. In 2011 the Souris River flooded, forcing relocations again.

Currently the zoo houses over 160 animals, some of the major ones being lions, tigers, leopards, bison, black footed ferret, brown bear, red panda, reticulated giraffe, timber wolf. They also house many other bird, primate, and reptile species.

=== Management ===
In 1970, the zoo was separated from the city-owned Roosevelt Park and the Greater Minot Zoological Society was created to operate the zoo. Today, the zoo is part of the Minot Park District and the GMZS still exists as a 501-c charity to support the zoo.

Director Rebeka Dewitz served as the CEO of the zoo 2006-2020, her tenure saw the creation of a new tiger and lion exhibit, getting the zoo through Association of Zoos and Aquariums (AZA) accreditation and the 2011 flood recovery. Dewitz became CEO of the Great Plains Zoo in South Dakota in 2020.

=== Floods ===
The Souris River flows through the zoo property which has caused flooding in the zoo itself.

The flood of 1969 caused every bird and animal to be moved from the zoo, which led to the redesign of the zoo grounds. An Australian emu and a bull elk died.

The 2011 Souris River Flood forced the zoo to remove all of its animals once again. The zoo sent more than 200 animals to 15 zoos. They were to reside only temporary but the zoo was underwater over six weeks. Areas of the zoo had "up to 12 feet of water. For three weeks, the zoo was really part of the river" according to David Merritt, "under general circumstances (the river) provides great ambiance for the zoo". Due to cleanup efforts on the grounds and buildings, the zoo did not open for the 2012 season. The Zoo re-opened on May 4 of 2013.

== Photo gallery ==
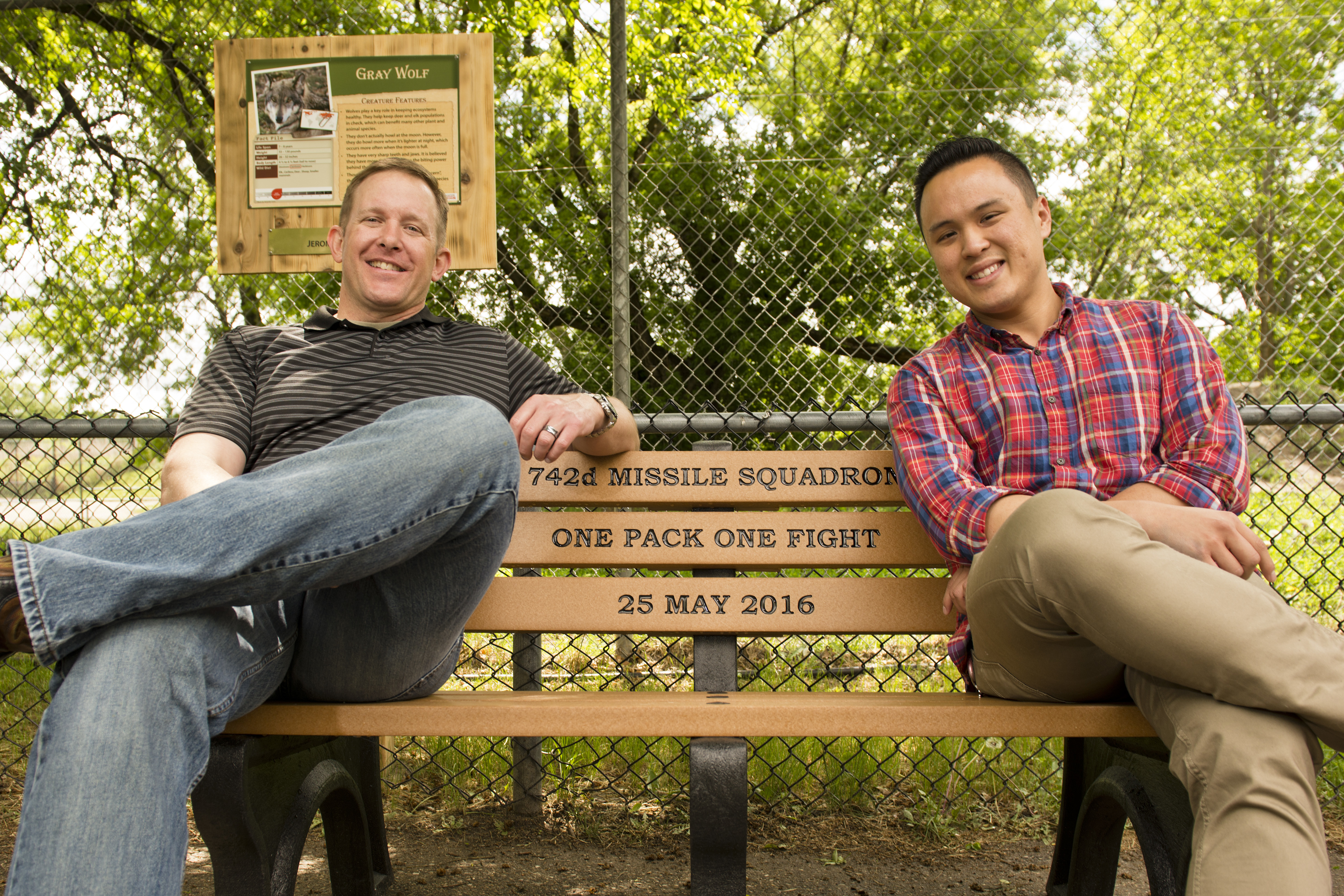
Bench donated in 2016 by the 742nd MS, aka The Wolf Pack, commemorates hundreds of volunteer hours at the zoo.

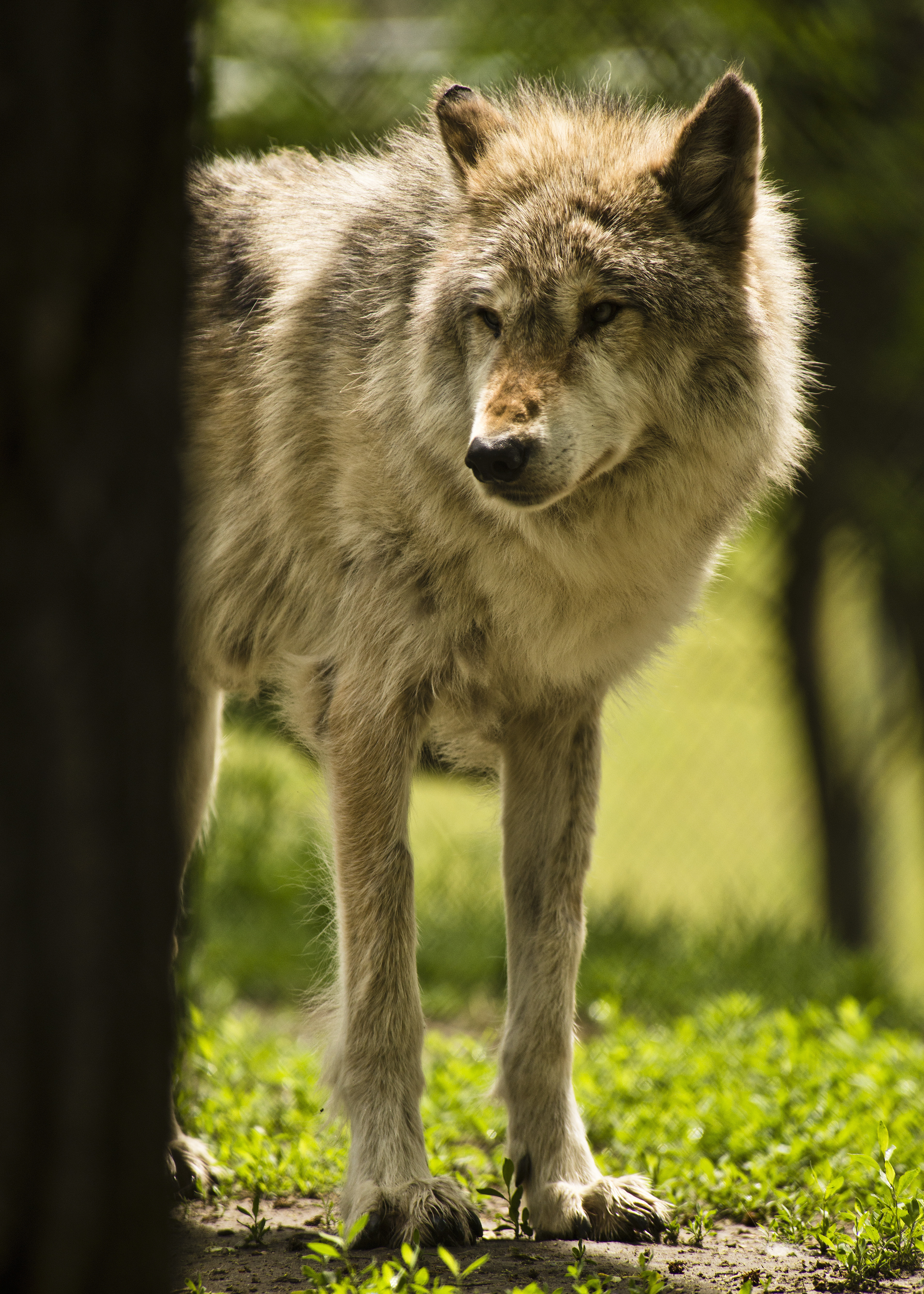
Grey wolf 2016
