= Minot Daily News =

Newspaper in Minot, North Dakota

Coordinates: 48.2332°N 101.2868°W

The Minot Daily News
- Type: Daily newspaper
- Format: Broadsheet
- Owner: Ogden Newspapers
- Founder: D.O. Preston
- Founded: 1886 (as Burlington Reporter)
- Language: English
- Headquarters: The Minot Daily News Building; 301 Fourth Street SE; Minot, North Dakota, US
- City: Minot, North Dakota
- Country: United States
- ISSN: 0885-3053
- OCLC number: 1758323
- Website: minotdailynews.com

The Minot Daily News is an American daily newspaper, printed in downtown Minot, North Dakota. It originated as the Burlington Reporter and was published out of Burlington, then the county seat, until the early 20th century. It is the primary daily paper for Ward County, as well as north central and northwest North Dakota, with an average daily circulation of 11,500 on weekdays.

== History ==
In April 1886, D.O. Preston founded the Burlington Reporter in Ward County. In February 1887, Joseph L. Colton assumed control of the Reporter. In January 1892, Colton leased the Reporter to H.B. Mann and C.A. Johnson. In April 1892, Johnson bought the paper and Mann stayed on as editor. In January 1897, Johnson sold the Reporter to George W. Wilson so he could serve as county supervisor.

In December 1898, Marshall McClure published the first edition of the Minot Optic. In October 1902, burglars set fire to a lumber yard next door to the Optic's office and the blaze destroyed both properties. In September 1905, the Second National Bank of Minot foreclosed on the Optic's mortgage and the paper entered receivership. Later that month, Wilson expanded the Reporter from a weekly into a daily. At that time the Reporter was based in Minot.

In January 1906, the bank purchased the Optic and then sold it to W.M. Smart, formerly of the St. Paul Pioneer Press. In May 1906, Wilson sold the Reporter to Sam H. Clark. In February 1907, a fire destroyed the Reporter's office, causing $26,000 in damage. In March 1909, a linotype caught fire at the Optic's office. The blaze damaged the building and injured two employees and two firefighters. Damages were estimated around $1,500. In August 1907, the Reporter switched from a morning to an evening paper, putting it in direct competition with the Optic.

In March 1910, the Reporter entered receivership as Guy F. Humphrey attempted to dissolve his partnership with Clark. In June 1910, Humphrey was seriously injured after his right hand got caught in the press rollers. In June 1911, Dorr H. Carroll bought the Reporter from Clark. In August 1912, Johnson reacquired the Reporter from Carroll. On May 7, 1914, the Optic and Reporter merged to form the Minot Optic-Reporter. The business was co-owned by Johnson and Smart. In November 1916, the Optic-Reporter was renamed to the Minot Daily News.

In December 1916, a gasoline leak from a coffee urn in a restaurant next-door resulted in a fire which destroyed the paper's office and caused $100,000 in property damages. In March 1918, a vandal painted the paper's office windows yellow and the perpetrator sent a later to another paper claiming the News was disloyal and a German sympathizer amid World War I.

In May 1920, N.B. Black, owner of The Fargo Forum, bought the News from Johnson and Smart. At that time Forum advertising manager Hal S. Davies was appointed News publisher and general manager. In November 1920, that same leaky coffee urn caused another fire next door, but this time a passerby put out the flames with a fire extinguisher before they reached the paper's building.

In October 1921, Raymond C. Dobson was hired as news editor. In February 1942, Dobson was elected president of the Northwest Daily Press Association. In July 1966, Dobson was elected grand exalted ruler of the Benevolent and Protective Order of Elks, making him head of the organization.

In September 1981, Davies died at age 95. In April 1985, Davies was inducted into the North Dakota Newspaper Hall of Fame. In May 1985, Donrey Media Group acquired the News from the Dobson and Davies families. In January 1986, 11 people were laid off from the paper. In October 1993, Ogden Newspapers acquired the News. In March 2002, R.C. Dobson was also inducted into the state's newspaper hall of fame.
