= KHRT =

Radio station in Minot, North Dakota

Coordinates: 48°11′48″N 101°14′1.6″W

Minot, North Dakota; United States
- Frequency: 1320 kHz
- Branding: K-Heart

Programming
- Format: Defunct (was gospel music)
- Affiliations: Salem Radio Network

Ownership
- Owner: Faith Broadcasting Inc.
- Sister stations: KHRT-FM

History
- First air date: November 17, 1957
- Last air date: July 31, 2024 (66 years, 257 days)
- Former call signs: KQDY (1957–1964)
- Call sign meaning: K-Heart

Technical information
- Class: B
- Power: 2,500 watts (day); 310 watts (night)

Links
- Website: www.khrt.com

KHRT (1320 AM) was a Christian radio station located in Minot, North Dakota. It was one of two religious stations, along with KHRT-FM, owned and operated in Minot by Faith Broadcasting Inc. KHRT concentrated on a southern gospel format, and also aired satellite-fed programming from Salem Communications during overnights and weekends. The station went on the air in 1957 as KQDY, became KHRT in 1964, and closed down in 2024.

Although classified as a commercial radio station by the Federal Communications Commission (FCC), Faith Broadcasting, Inc. acted as a nonprofit organization using commercial advertisements for funding, though it also took donations.

== History ==
=== Early years ===
Walter N. Nelskog, Paul Crain, Delbert Bertholf, and D. Gene Williams, doing business as Dakota Broadcasters, applied for a new 1,000-watt daytime-only station on 1320 kHz in Minot in late 1956. The principals owned stations in Washington, Oregon, and Montana, and concurrently applied for a station on 1350 kHz at Bismarck. The Minot construction permit was granted in June 1957, issued the call sign KQDY, and went on the air November 17. Nelskog sold his 25-percent interest in the station to Crain for $12,000 in 1959, giving Crain a 50 percent stake; concurrently, Crain also bought Nelskog's stake in KUDI in Great Falls, Montana, and Nelskog bought Crain's interest in KQTY in Everett, Washington. Later that year, station manager H.T. Searle acquired a 25-percent stake in Dakota Broadcasters, with Crain's stake returning to 25 percent. Jack W. Birchill, a KUDI employee, took a stake in KQDY in 1960.

=== Christian radio ===
Dakota Broadcasters sold KQDY to the non-profit People's Radio Association for $92,500 in 1964. Three of the new owners' principals—Gordon L. Beck, Gerald M. Swanson, and A. Orville Helgeson—were associated with religious groups, with Swanson and Helgeson having respectively served as the program director and general manager of KGDN in Seattle; the fourth, J. Merrill Tannehill, was a farmer. The new owners changed the call sign to KHRT on September 17, 1964. In late 1966, the station's license was transferred to a trustee in bankruptcy, R. P. Kephart; the following year, KHRT manager Harold R. Christensen bought the station via KHRT Broadcasting Corporation for $108,000.

Richard B. Leavitt's Faith Broadcasting Inc. bought KHRT for $188,248 in 1982. Leavitt, a former salesman for the station, acquired it after Christensen told him during a Sunday school class that KHRT was for sale and was considering dropping its Christian radio format. Leavitt added an FM sister station, KHRT-FM, in 1992.

=== Expanded Band assignment ===
On March 17, 1997, the Federal Communications Commission (FCC) announced that 88 stations had been given permission to move to newly available "Expanded Band" transmitting frequencies, ranging from 1610 to 1700 kHz, with KHRT authorized to move from 1320 to 1620 kHz. However, the construction permit needed to implement the authorization was cancelled on December 22, 2000, so the expanded band assignment was never built.

=== Closure ===
On July 31, 2024, both KHRT and KHRT-FM signed off the air due to lack of funding and a downturn in advertising revenue; the licenses were put up for sale. The closure came four years after the death of Dick Leavitt; the stations by this point were managed by his son Roy. While Faith Broadcasting would sell KHRT-FM to RadioDifferently LLC, no buyer was found for the AM station. On February 24, 2025, coinciding with the planned completion of KHRT-FM's sale, Faith Broadcasting requested the cancellation of the KHRT AM license, which occurred on February 27. Faith Broadcasting continued to seek buyers for the station's equipment and office furniture.
