= Minot Bypass =

Minot Bypass may refer to:

- U.S. Route 83 Bypass, a bypass of U.S. Route 83 to the west of Minot, North Dakota
- A loop around the city that consists of portions of U.S. Route 83 Bypass, as well as U.S. Route 2 and U.S. Route 52
