= KMXA-FM =

Coordinates: 48.183°N 101.533°W

Minot, North Dakota; United States
- Broadcast area: Minot, North Dakota
- Frequency: 99.9 MHz
- Branding: Mix 99.9

Programming
- Format: Adult contemporary

Ownership
- Owner: iHeartMedia, Inc.; (iHM Licenses, LLC)
- Sister stations: KCJB, KIZZ, KRRZ, KYYX, KZPR

History
- First air date: 1983; 43 years ago (as KBQQ)
- Former call signs: KBQQ (1983–1996)
- Call sign meaning: "Mix"

Technical information
- Licensing authority: FCC
- Facility ID: 34996
- Class: C1
- ERP: 100,000 watts
- HAAT: 142 meters (466 ft)

Links
- Public license information: Public file; LMS
- Webcast: Listen Live
- Website: mix999fm.iheart.com

KMXA-FM (99.9 FM, "Mix 99.9") is an adult contemporary radio station in Minot, North Dakota, owned by iHeartMedia, Inc. During the Christmas season "Mix 99.9" plays continuous Christmas music. The station transitions to playing continuous Christmas music during the holiday season.

iHeartMedia also owns and operates KCJB 910, KRRZ 1390, KIZZ 93.7, KYYX 97.1 and KZPR 105.3 in Minot.

== History ==
KMXA-FM first signed on the air in 1983. The station's initial call sign was KBQQ before it was changed to KMXA-FM. The General Manager for the station in 1990 was Allison Bostow

The station's broadcasting facilities are located at 1000 20th Ave. SW in Minot. The station is owned by iHeartMedia, Inc., through its licensee iHM Licenses, LLC, and is part of the company's cluster serving the Minot market KMXA-FM was included in the proposed 2007 sale of 185 Clear Channel (now iHeartMedia) radio stations to GoodRadio, LLC. The deal was ultimately terminated due to financing issues, resulting in KMXA-FM remaining under iHeartMedia ownership.
