= Drift Prairie =

Geographic region in the U.S. states of North Dakota and South Dakota

The Drift Prairie is a geographic region in the U.S. states of North Dakota and South Dakota.

In North Dakota, the Drift Prairie is the transition zone between two zones. The gently rolling hills and shallow lakes were formed by glacial action, while the badlands to the west are characterized by the lack of this action, and the Red River Valley to the east was a lakebed. This distinction causes the area considered the Drift Prairie to overlap somewhat with the Missouri Plateau, another of North Dakota's distinct geographic regions, but the Drift Prairie also includes the Souris River basin. Prairie grasses and wheat grow there, making it a perfect place for ranchers. The prairie is filled with drift, a type of soil consisting of clay, sand, and gravel originating from glacial processes.

In South Dakota, most of the eastern part of the state is covered by the Drift Prairie. The Missouri River cuts through the center of the state. To the east of the river are low hills and lakes formed by glaciers referred to as the Drift Prairie. The area is bordered on the east by the Minnesota River Valley and on the west by the James River Basin.

== See also ==
- Geography of North Dakota
- Geography of South Dakota
