= KZPR =

Minot, North Dakota; United States
- Broadcast area: Minot, North Dakota
- Frequency: 105.3 MHz
- Branding: The Fox 105.3

Programming
- Format: Active rock

Ownership
- Owner: iHeartMedia, Inc.; (iHM Licenses, LLC)
- Sister stations: KCJB, KIZZ, KMXA-FM, KRRZ, KYYX

History
- First air date: 1985; 41 years ago

Technical information
- Licensing authority: FCC
- Facility ID: 9675
- Class: C1
- ERP: 100,000 watts
- HAAT: 169 meters (554 ft)
- Transmitter coordinates: 48°03′11″N 101°26′05″W

Links
- Public license information: Public file; LMS
- Webcast: Listen Live
- Website: 1053thefox.iheart.com

KZPR (105.3 FM, "The Fox 105.3") is an active rock format radio station in Minot, North Dakota, owned by iHeartMedia, Inc. The station began as a classic rock station but has evolved into an active rock station and competes with classic rock formatted KTZU "94.9 The Zoo". KZPR is an affiliate of the University of North Dakota athletics broadcasts.

== History ==
KZPR first signed on the air in 1985. In 2007, a proposed sale of 185 Clear Channel (now iHeartMedia) radio stations, including the entire Minot cluster, to Dean Goodman's GoodRadio, LLC, was announced the deal, which involved a total of $452.1 million in assets, was ultimately terminated due to financing issues, resulting in KZPR and its sister stations remaining under iHeartMedia ownership.
