= KIZZ =

Coordinates: 48.053°N 101.435°W

- Minot, North Dakota; United States
- Broadcast area: Minot metropolitan area
- Frequency: 93.7 MHz
- Branding: Z94

Programming
- Language: English
- Format: Contemporary hit radio
- Affiliations: Premiere Networks; Westwood One

Ownership
- Owner: iHeartMedia; (iHM Licenses, LLC)
- Sister stations: KCJB; KMXA-FM; KRRZ; KYYX; KZPR

History
- First air date: September 7, 1968; 57 years ago
- Former call signs: KMOT-FM (1967–1978)
- Call sign meaning: "Z94"

Technical information
- Licensing authority: FCC
- Class: C1
- ERP: 100,000 watts
- HAAT: 169 meters (554 ft)

Links
- Public license information: Public file; LMS
- Webcast: Listen live (via iHeartRadio)
- Website: z94radio.iheart.com

KIZZ (93.7 FM) is a contemporary hit radio station located in Minot, North Dakota owned by iHeartMedia. The station carries nationally syndicated programming distributed by iHeartMedia such as Ryan Seacrest's American Top 40 and The Fred Show.

== History ==
KIZZ was historically owned by WDAY-AM/TV based in Fargo, North Dakota, when it was known as WDAY-FM. The call letters were changed to KIZZ in 1978 when the station launched its contemporary hit format. KIZZ first signed on the air in 1978. The same call letters were assigned in the 1960s, to an AM sunlight-only radio station in El Paso, Texas, an early entrant in the category of conservative talk radio stations. Z94 debuted in 1978, after being KMOT-FM. It switched from Top 40 to hot adult contemporary in 1992, and returned to Top 40 by 1998.

The station is owned by iHeartMedia, Inc., through its licensee iHM Licenses, LLC, and is part of the company's cluster of stations serving the Minot market.

In 2007, KIZZ was included in the proposed sale of 185 Clear Channel (now iHeartMedia) radio stations to GoodRadio, LLC. The deal was ultimately terminated due to financing issues, resulting in KIZZ remaining under iHeartMedia ownership. iHeartMedia also owns and operates KCJB 910, KRRZ 1390, KYYX 97.1, KMXA-FM 99.9 and KZPR 105.3 in Minot.

Former logo
