= KYYX =

Coordinates: 48.051°N 101.342°W

- Minot, North Dakota; United States
- Broadcast area: Minot, North Dakota
- Frequency: 97.1 MHz
- Branding: 97 KICKS

Programming
- Format: Country
- Affiliations: Premiere Networks

Ownership
- Owner: iHeartMedia, Inc.; (iHM Licenses, LLC)
- Sister stations: KCJB; KIZZ; KMXA-FM; KRRZ; KZPR

History
- First air date: 1966
- Former call signs: KCJB-FM (1966–1983); KYND (1983–1984); KHHT (1984–1992)
- Call sign meaning: Pronounced as "kicks"

Technical information
- Licensing authority: FCC
- Facility ID: 55680
- Class: C
- ERP: 95,000 watts
- HAAT: 300 meters (980 ft)

Links
- Public license information: Public file; LMS
- Webcast: Listen live (via iHeartRadio)
- Website: 97kicksfm.iheart.com

KYYX (97.1 FM) is a country music radio station in Minot, North Dakota, owned by iHeartMedia, Inc. The call sign "KYYX" is pronounced as "kicks" and the station's nickname is "97 Kicks FM".

The station is owned by iHeartMedia, Inc., through its licensee iHM Licenses, LLC, and is part of the company's cluster of stations serving the Minot market along with KCJB 910, KRRZ 1390, KIZZ 93.7, KMXA-FM 99.9, and KZPR 105.3.

== History ==
KYYX first signed on the air in 1966. In 2007, KYYX was included in the proposed sale of 185 Clear Channel radio stations to GoodRadio.TV. The deal was ultimately terminated due to financing issues, resulting in KYYX remaining under Clear Channel (now iHeartMedia) ownership.

== Previous KYYX stations ==
This radio station is not the first with the callsign KYYX. The original KYYX first operated a Top 40 format in the 1970s, then as a new wave-themed radio station in Seattle, Washington, in the early 1980s. A country radio station in Las Vegas, Nevada, operated as KYYX from 1985 to 1987 before going off the air and changing its callsign.
