= KSAF-LP =

- Minot, North Dakota; United States
- Frequency: 104.1 MHz

Programming
- Format: Christian
- Affiliations: LifeTalk Radio Network

Ownership
- Owner: True Light Broadcasting, Inc.; (True Light Broadcasting, Inc.)

History
- First air date: 2005

Technical information
- Licensing authority: FCC
- Facility ID: 135303
- Class: L1
- ERP: 85 watts
- HAAT: 26.9 meters (88 feet)
- Transmitter coordinates: 48°13′00″N 101°17′38″W

Links
- Public license information: LMS
- Website: www.truelightradio.org

KSAF-LP (104.1 FM) is a low power radio station licensed to True Light Broadcasting, Inc., a ministry of the Seventh-day Adventist Church in Minot, North Dakota. It airs a Christian radio format.

The station was assigned the KSAF-LP call letters by the Federal Communications Commission on March 26, 2004.

== See also ==
- Media ministries of the Seventh-day Adventist Church
