= KCJB =

Radio station in Minot, North Dakota

Coordinates: 48°12′9″N 101°20′55.6″W

- Minot, North Dakota; United States
- Broadcast area: Minot, North Dakota
- Frequency: 910 kHz
- Branding: 91 Country KCJB

Programming
- Format: Classic country; talk
- Affiliations: Minnesota Twins

Ownership
- Owner: iHeartMedia, Inc.; (iHM Licenses, LLC)
- Sister stations: KIZZ; KMXA-FM; KRRZ; KYYX; KZPR

History
- First air date: 1950

Technical information
- Licensing authority: FCC
- Facility ID: 55681
- Class: B
- Power: 5,000 watts

Links
- Public license information: Public file; LMS
- Webcast: Listen live (via iHeartRadio)
- Website: kcjb910.iheart.com

KCJB (910 AM) is a classic country radio station in Minot, North Dakota. KCJB carries the Minnesota Twins.

iHeartMedia, Inc. also owns and operates KYYX 97.1, KRRZ 1390, KIZZ 93.7, KMXA-FM 99.9, and KZPR 105.3 in Minot.

KCJB is known for its local farm and agriculture reporting, including dedicated programming to agribusiness news relevant to North Dakota farmers and ranchers.

== History ==
KCJB first signed on the air in 1950. During the early 1950s, the station was instrumental in bringing broadcasting to the region. In 1953, the station launched an associated television station, KCJB-TV (later KXMC-TV), making it the first television station in North Dakota. The station was owned by businessman John W. Boler, who was involved in the development of other North Dakota radio and television outlets. Early KCJB radio personalities included Jim Adelson (1952–1953) and Cis Hadley.

In 2007, a proposed sale of 185 Clear Channel Communications radio stations, including the entire Minot cluster, to Dean Goodman's GoodRadio.TV, was announced. The deal was ultimately terminated due to financing issues, resulting in KCJB and its sister stations remaining under Clear Channel (now iHeartMedia) ownership.
