= KRRZ =

Coordinates: 48°12′45″N 101°14′30″W

Minot, North Dakota; United States
- Frequency: 1390 kHz
- Branding: 1390 KRRZ AM

Programming
- Format: Classic hits
- Affiliations: Premiere Networks; Minnesota Vikings

Ownership
- Owner: iHeartMedia; (iHM Licenses, LLC)
- Sister stations: KCJB, KIZZ, KMXA-FM, KYYX, KZPR

History
- First air date: October 28, 1929; 96 years ago
- Former call signs: KLPM (1929–1984)
- Call sign meaning: Pronounced as cars

Technical information
- Licensing authority: FCC
- Facility ID: 9679
- Class: B
- Power: 5,000 watts day 1,000 watts night

Links
- Public license information: Public file; LMS
- Webcast: Listen Live
- Website: classichits1390.iheart.com

KRRZ (1390 AM, "Classic Hits 1390") is a classic hits radio station in Minot, North Dakota, owned by iHeartMedia through licensee iHM Licenses, LLC. KRRZ also airs Minnesota Vikings football games and The Rush Limbaugh Show.

iHeartMedia, Inc. also owns and operates KYYX 97.1, KCJB 910, KIZZ 93.7, KMXA-FM 99.9, and KZPR 105.3 in Minot.

On May 20, 2019, iHeartMedia requested to transfer the license of KRRZ back from Aloha Station Trust II LLC to its portfolio. The assignment of the license was consummated on July 2, 2019. First Lutheran Church in Minot broadcasts its Sunday morning worship services live on KRRZ 1390 AM.

== History ==
KRRZ is one of the oldest licensed stations in North Dakota, with a first air date of October 28, 1929. The station originally broadcast under the call sign KLPM until 1984.

The current KRRZ call sign was transferred to 1390 AM in the mid-1980s from an FM station in Fargo. The station's branding, KRRZ, is often pronounced as "cars." The deal was ultimately terminated due to financing issues, resulting in KRRZ remaining under iHeartMedia ownership. The station was later placed into the Aloha Station Trust II LLC before being formally transferred back to iHeartMedia's portfolio in July 2019.
