= Minot, North Dakota =

- City
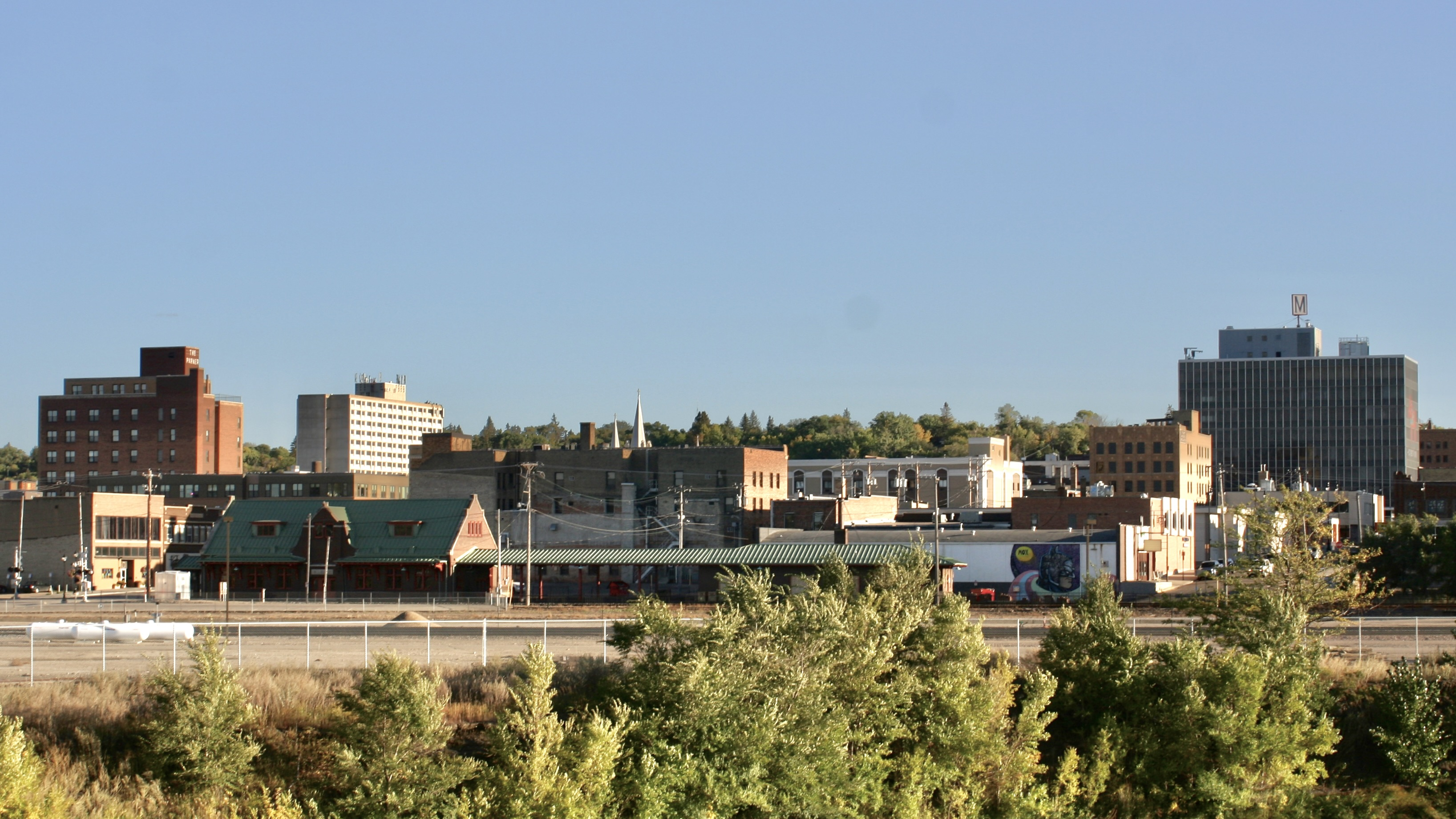
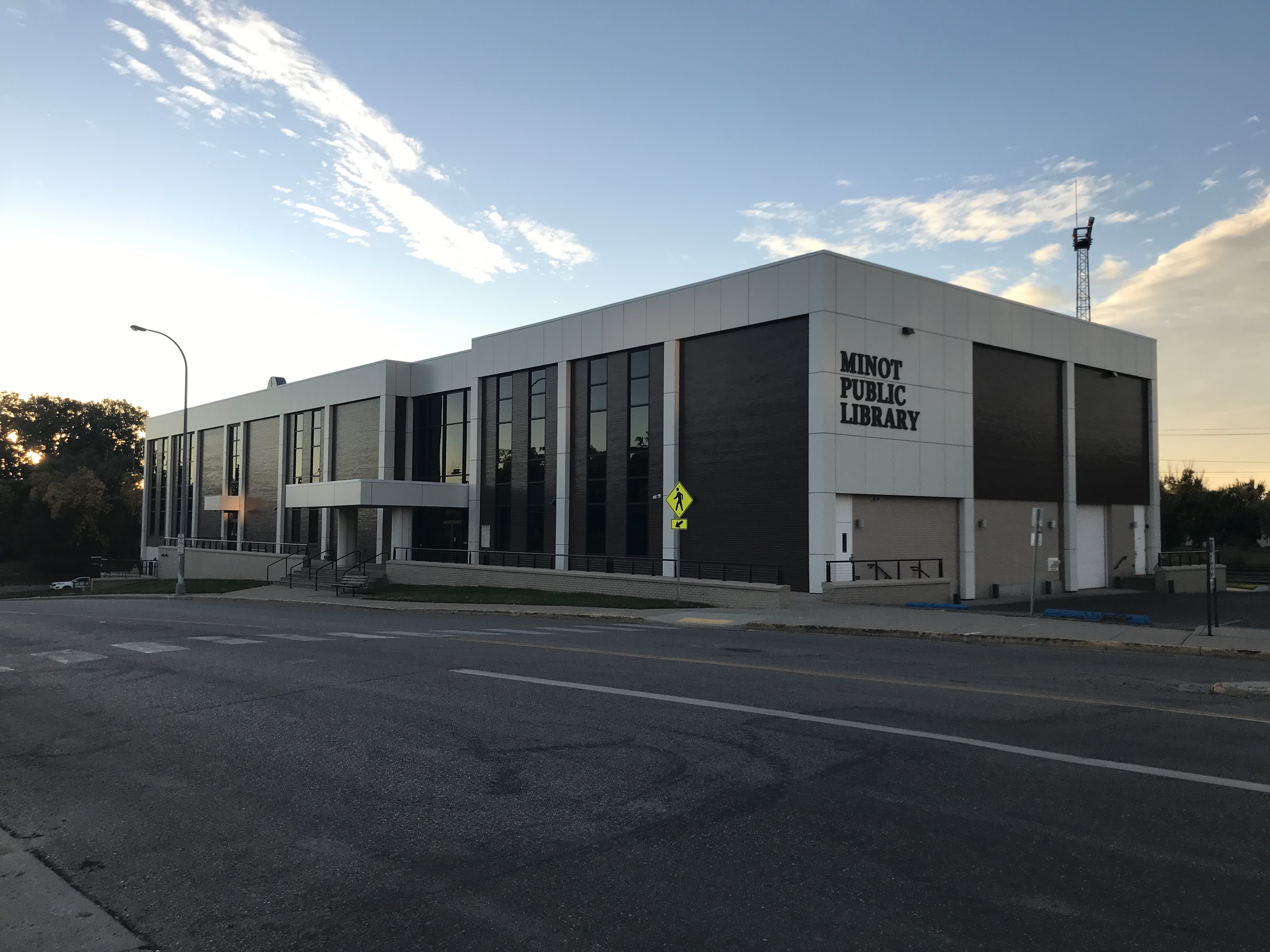
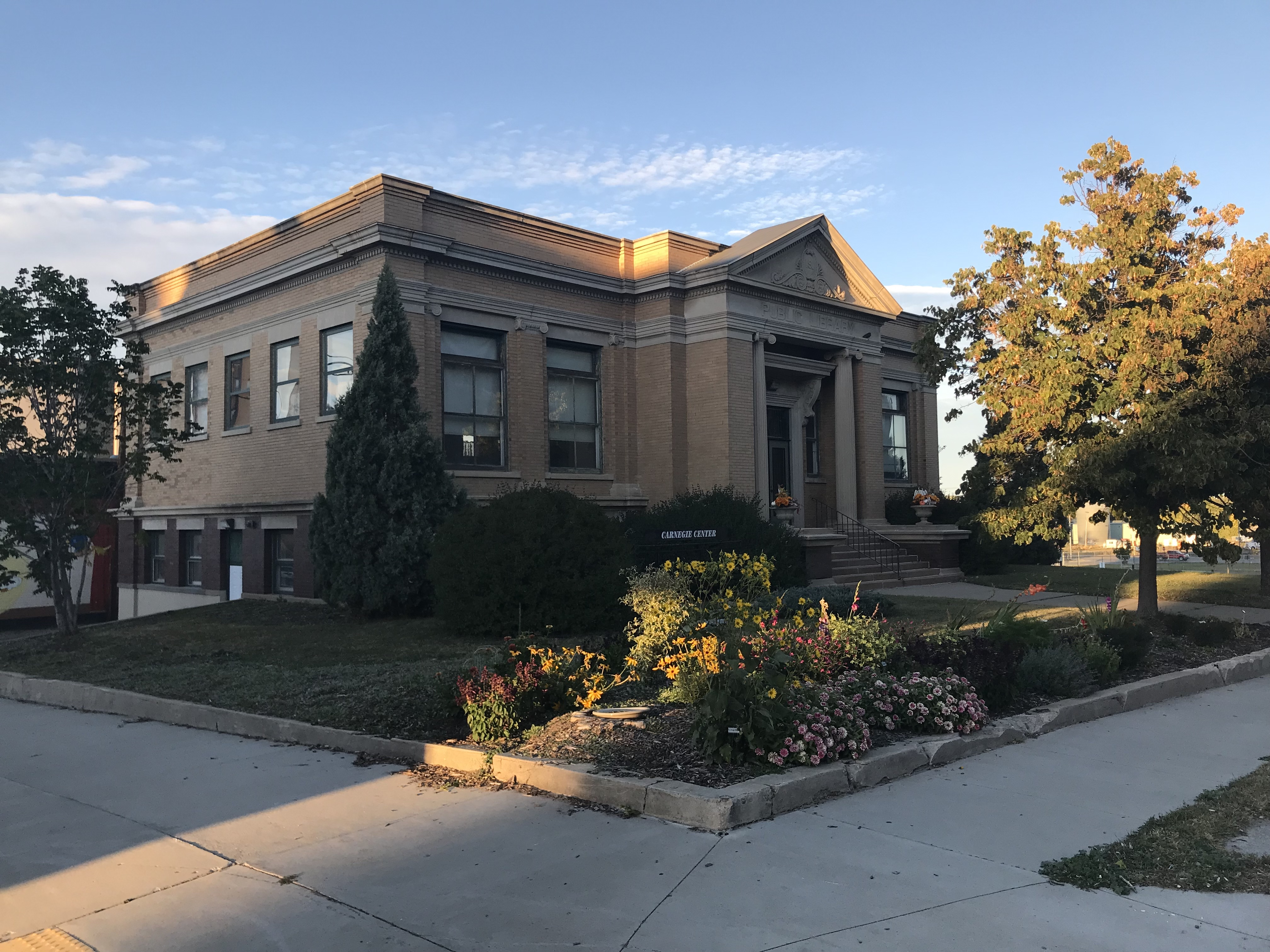
- Downtown Minot Minot Public Library Minot Carnegie Library

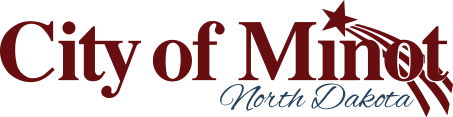
- Flag Seal Logo
- Nickname: "The Magic City"
- Interactive map of Minot, North Dakota
- Location within North Dakota Location within the United States
- Coordinates: 48°14′15.41″N 101°16′44.42″W
- Country: United States
- State: North Dakota
- County: Ward
- Founded: 1886
- Incorporated: July 16, 1887

Government
  - Mayor: Mark Jantzer (acting mayor)
  - President: Mark Jantzer
  - Vice president: Lisa Olson
  - Councilmembers: Mike Blessum; Rob Fuller; Paul Pitner; Scott Samuelson

Area
  - City: 27.734 sq mi (71.831 km^{2})
  - Land: 27.701 sq mi (71.744 km^{2})
  - Water: 0.033 sq mi (0.085 km^{2})
- Elevation: 1,549 ft (472 m)

Population (2020)
  - City: 48,377
  - Estimate (2023): 47,373
  - Rank: US: 850th ND: 4th
  - Density: 1,710.5/sq mi (660.41/km^{2})
  - Urban: 50,925 (US: 498th)
  - Metro: 75,742 (US: 382nd)
- Demonym: Minoter
- Time zone: UTC–6 (CST)
  - Summer (DST): UTC–5 (CDT)
- ZIP Codes: 58701, 58702, 58703, 58704, 58705, 58707
- Area code: 701
- FIPS code: 38-53380
- GNIS feature ID: 1036165
- Highways: US 2, US 52, US 83, US 83 Byp.
- Sales tax: 7.5%
- Website: minotnd.gov

Minot (/ˈmaɪnɒt/ MY-not) is a city in and the county seat of Ward County, North Dakota, United States. With a population of 48,377 at the 2020 census, Minot is the state's fourth-most populous city. The Minot metropolitan area in north-central North Dakota covers McHenry, Renville, and Ward counties and had a combined population of 77,546 at the 2020 census.

Minot was founded in 1886 during the construction of James J. Hill's Great Northern Railway. Minot is also known as "Magic City", commemorating its remarkable growth in size over a short time. It is a trading center for a large part of northern North Dakota, southwestern Manitoba, and southeastern Saskatchewan. It is most widely known for the Minot Air Force Base, approximately 15 miles (24 km) north of the city.

== History ==
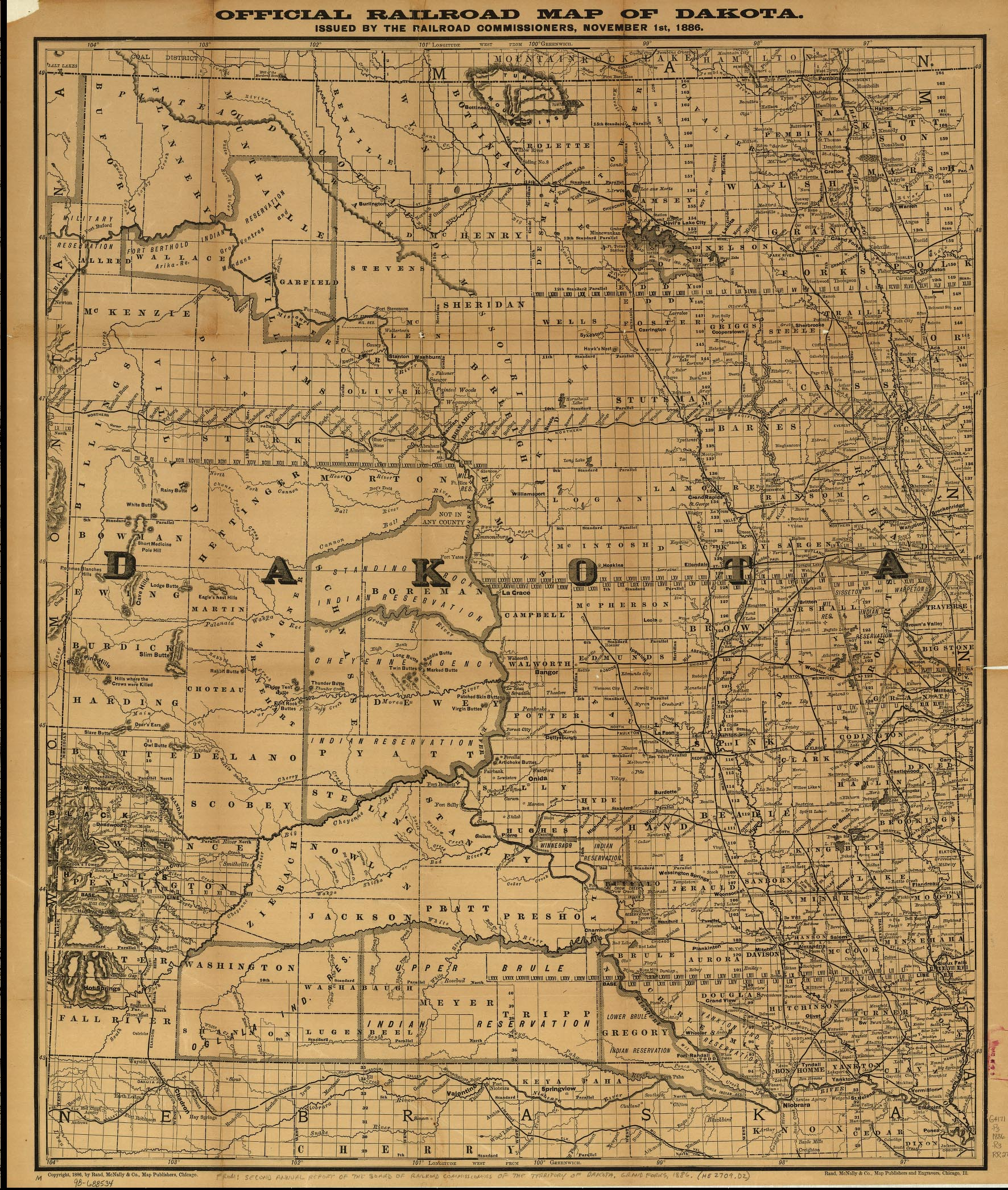
Dakota Territory c. 1886, showing Burlington, at the time the county seat, and Minot, which was a smaller, unincorporated village

Minot came into existence in 1886, after the Great Northern Railway laid track through the area. A tent town sprang up overnight, as if by "magic", giving Minot its first nickname, the Magic City; in the next five months, the population increased to over 5,000, further bolstering the nickname. The town site was chosen by the railroad to be placed on the land of homesteader Erik Ramstad, who was convinced to relinquish his claim and became one of the city leaders. The town was named after Henry Minot (1859–1890), a Great Northern investor, ornithologist, and friend of Hill. Its Arikara name is niwaharít sahaáhkat, and its Hidatsa name is maagada'ashish ("Plum Coulee").

The city was incorporated on July 16, 1887. The Minneapolis, St. Paul and Sault Ste. Marie Railroad (Soo Line) later built a line from Valley City to Canada. While initially their plan was to cross the Souris River at Burlington, local interests and arguments convinced them otherwise; landholders along the new route donated the right-of-way, and the Soo Line reached Minot in 1893.

In 1898, a tornado destroyed the timber Gassman Coulee Bridge near Minot. A passenger train, just three minutes away from crossing the bridge when it collapsed, was able to stop just in time to avoid disaster. Until a new trestle, this time made of steel, was built in 1899, the railroad ferried passengers across the coulee using wagons and buggies that transported them to another train parked on the other side of the coulee.

On July 22, 1920, a tornado passed over Minot and bore down in a coulee three miles (5 km) southeast of town. The tornado picked up Andy Botz's home and hurled it to the ground, killing his wife, breaking Botz's shoulder, and slightly injuring the two Botz children who were in the house.

Minot and its surrounding area were wide open from 1905 to 1920. The population grew rapidly due to railroad construction and availability of unclaimed land. Nearly complete court records of Ward County and Minot document the prevalence and different types of criminal activity, and offer strong support for the epithet "crime capitol of North Dakota". State attorney general William Langer helped clean up the town in 1917–1920, but by the time Prohibition arrived in the 1920s, Minot had become a center of illegal activities associated with the High Third district, exacerbated because the city was a supply hub of Al Capone's liquor smuggling operations. The hotbed of alcohol bootlegging, prostitution, and opium dens that sprang up in the downtown area soon led people to nickname Minot "Little Chicago". Smugglers used a network of tunnels (some previously built for heating or deliveries) to transport and conceal illicit cargo entering from Canada.

The 1950s saw a large influx of federal funding into the region, with the construction of Minot Air Force Base (1956–1957) thirteen miles (21 km) north of the city, and Garrison Dam (1947–1953) on the Missouri River, about fifty miles (80 km) south. In 1969, a severe flood on the Souris River devastated Minot in April. Afterward, the Army Corps of Engineers straightened the river's path through the city and built several flood control structures.

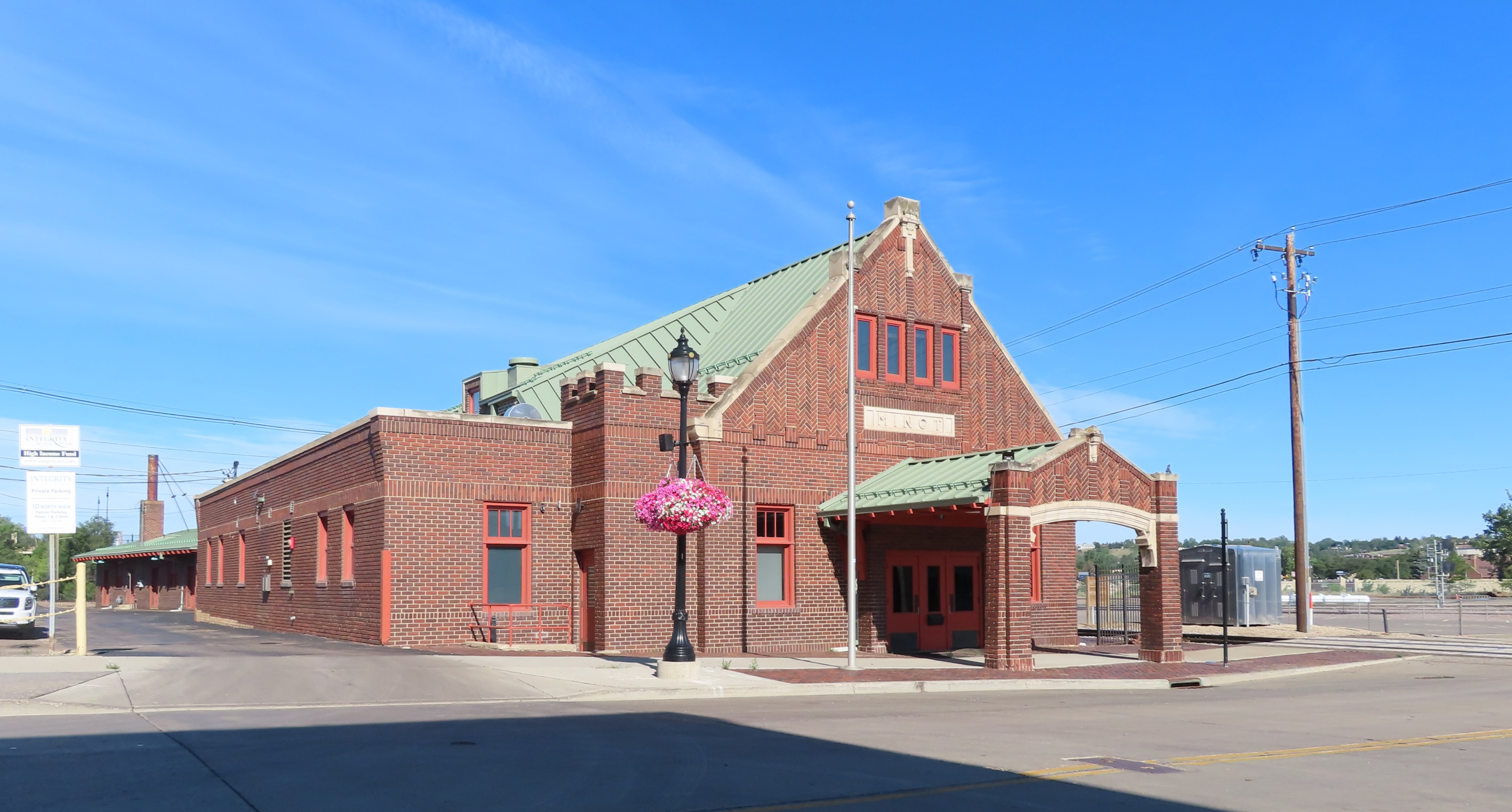
The Old Soo Depot Transportation Museum is housed in the historic Soo Line Depot (built 1912) in downtown Minot.

On January 18, 2002, a severe train derailment west of the city sent a gigantic cloud of anhydrous ammonia toward Minot and Burlington. One man died and many of Minot's citizens were sickened and severely injured by the gas, causing one of the worst major chemical accidents of the country. In early 2006, court cases were heard in Minneapolis, Minnesota, against Canadian Pacific Railway, the owner of the derailed train. The anhydrous ammonia spill was the largest such spill in U.S. history. Eric Klinenberg used the incident in his book Fighting for Air: The Battle to Control America's Media as an example of the failure of mass media, specifically local radio stations, to disseminate information in an emergency.

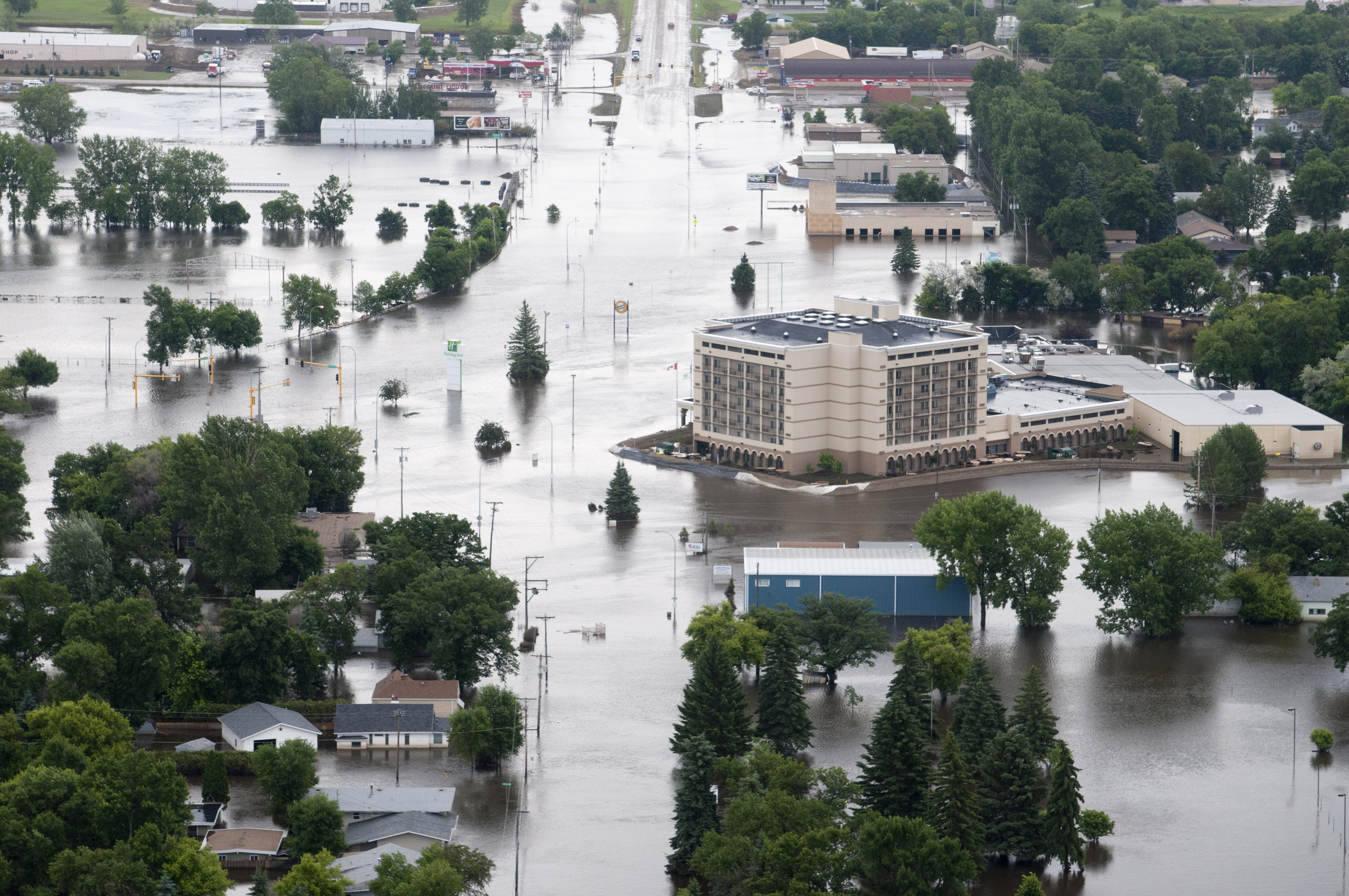
2011 Souris River flood in Minot

The 2011 Souris River flood caused extensive damage throughout the Souris River Valley. On June 21, 2011, KXMC-TV reported that a flood of historic proportions was imminent in the valley, largely due to large dam releases upstream. Around 12,000 people were evacuated. On June 26, flooding exceeded previous records when the river crested at 1,561.7 feet (476.0 m) above sea level, three feet (0.9 m) above the previous record set in 1881. It is estimated that 20% of Minot sustained damage from the flood; this figure includes over 4,100 homes that were in some way affected, 2,376 extensively damaged, and 805 damaged beyond repair. Burlington was also severely damaged during this time.

== Geography ==
According to the United States Census Bureau, the city has an area of 27.734 square miles (71.83 km^{2}), of which 27.701 square miles (71.75 km^{2}) is land and 0.033 square miles (0.09 km^{2}) is water. Minot is on the Drift Prairie of northwestern North Dakota, about 110 miles (180 km) north of Bismarck. The Mouse River, or Souris River, runs through the city from west to east. Minot is almost entirely land; the Mouse River, its oxbow lakes, and a few creeks take up just 0.14% of the city's area.

The Mouse River divides the city approximately in half, north and south. The valley rises to the plains both north and south of the river. Although there are names for certain features of these hills, such as Anthony Hill on South Hill, there are no general names for these topographical features. The northern rise and the plateau north of it are called North Hill and the southern rise and plateau south of it are called South Hill.

The elevation of the river at the city center is approximately 1,540 feet (470 m) above sea level. The valley sits 160 feet (49 m) below the surrounding plains; the elevation at the Minot International Airport on North Hill is 1,716 feet (523 m). The city has several small horseshoe-shaped oxbow lakes within its limits near the river, created by the Mouse's meandering course.

The population of Richardson's ground squirrels is extremely high in the inner-city area where there are fewer predators to hunt them. This has been known to cause issues with the squirrels tearing up fields with their tunneling, and causing minor property damage by hollowing out areas beneath structures.

=== Neighborhoods ===
Minot is commonly divided into three major sections: North Hill, the Mouse River Valley and South Hill. North Hill is the area roughly north of Eleventh Avenue North and Northwest Avenue. South Hill is a broad area south and west of Valley Street and Fifth Avenue South. West of Sixth Street West, South Hill dips sharply to the southwest. South Hill's limits are less clearly defined than North Hill's. Though the neighborhood levels out past 16th Street South, the name South Hill is generally applied to all areas south up to the city limits. Neighborhoods in the Mouse River Valley include Bel Air, Downtown, Eastwood Park, Oak Park and West Minot.

=== Address system ===
The city is laid out on a grid-based street system. Streets run north–south and avenues run east–west. Streets are numbered by their block distance east or west of Main Street. Avenues are numbered north and south of Central Avenue. There are four city quadrants (NW, SW, SE, NE) to designate the location of any address. Main Street addresses are designated North and South. Central Avenue addresses are designated East and West. The grid system carries over into the rural areas of Ward County, making the county one of only three that do not follow the statewide grid system (the others are Burleigh County and Grand Forks County).

=== Climate ===
Minot experiences a warm-summer humid continental climate (Köppen: Dfb). Like Central Asia, it exhibits great temperature variation. Summers range from warm to moderately hot, with frequent thunderstorm activity. Winters are typically bitterly cold and snowy, with high winds and below-freezing temperatures for weeks at a time. Lows below 0 °F (−18 °C) occur on about 39 days during the winter, while temperatures reach 90 °F (32 °C) on 14 days per summer, and in some years reach 100 °F (38 °C). The average annual snowfall total is 42.5 inches (108 cm).

Climate data for Minot, North Dakota (southern suburb), 1991–2020 normals, extremes 1905–present
Month	Jan	Feb	Mar	Apr	May	Jun	Jul	Aug	Sep	Oct	Nov	Dec	Year
Record high °F (°C)	59 (15)	64 (18)	80 (27)	98 (37)	105 (41)	109 (43)	109 (43)	106 (41)	104 (40)	91 (33)	77 (25)	66 (19)	109 (43)
Mean daily maximum °F (°C)	18.5 (−7.5)	22.4 (−5.3)	34.7 (1.5)	51.4 (10.8)	65.0 (18.3)	73.9 (23.3)	79.7 (26.5)	79.9 (26.6)	69.5 (20.8)	53.4 (11.9)	36.1 (2.3)	23.3 (−4.8)	50.6 (10.3)
Daily mean °F (°C)	9.6 (−12.4)	13.3 (−10.4)	25.2 (−3.8)	39.9 (4.4)	53.2 (11.8)	63.1 (17.3)	68.1 (20.1)	67.0 (19.4)	57.1 (13.9)	42.5 (5.8)	27.1 (−2.7)	14.9 (−9.5)	40.1 (4.5)
Mean daily minimum °F (°C)	0.7 (−17.4)	4.2 (−15.4)	15.7 (−9.1)	28.5 (−1.9)	41.4 (5.2)	52.3 (11.3)	56.5 (13.6)	54.0 (12.2)	44.7 (7.1)	31.5 (−0.3)	18.1 (−7.7)	6.4 (−14.2)	29.5 (−1.4)
Record low °F (°C)	−47 (−44)	−49 (−45)	−35 (−37)	−12 (−24)	9 (−13)	24 (−4)	30 (−1)	26 (−3)	11 (−12)	−16 (−27)	−27 (−33)	−44 (−42)	−49 (−45)
Average precipitation inches (mm)	0.63 (16)	0.58 (15)	0.84 (21)	1.22 (31)	2.78 (71)	3.74 (95)	2.54 (65)	2.11 (54)	1.65 (42)	1.41 (36)	0.98 (25)	0.80 (20)	19.28 (490)
Average snowfall inches (cm)	8.3 (21)	6.9 (18)	7.8 (20)	4.4 (11)	1.8 (4.6)	0.0 (0.0)	0.0 (0.0)	0.0 (0.0)	0.0 (0.0)	3.6 (9.1)	8.9 (23)	10.1 (26)	51.8 (132)
Average precipitation days (≥ 0.01 in)	7.1	6.4	5.8	6.9	9.8	11.8	9.2	8.5	7.1	7.1	6.1	7.4	93.2
Average snowy days (≥ 0.1 in)	6.1	5.8	4.1	1.6	0.7	0.0	0.0	0.0	0.0	1.3	4.3	6.5	30.4
Source: National Oceanic and Atmospheric Administration

Climate data for Minot Int'l, North Dakota (1991–2020 normals, extremes 1948–present)
Month	Jan	Feb	Mar	Apr	May	Jun	Jul	Aug	Sep	Oct	Nov	Dec	Year
Record high °F (°C)	61 (16)	66 (19)	79 (26)	94 (34)	99 (37)	105 (41)	105 (41)	107 (42)	106 (41)	94 (34)	79 (26)	62 (17)	107 (42)
Mean daily maximum °F (°C)	23.3 (−4.8)	27.0 (−2.8)	39.5 (4.2)	55.8 (13.2)	68.9 (20.5)	77.5 (25.3)	83.8 (28.8)	83.7 (28.7)	73.1 (22.8)	56.8 (13.8)	39.7 (4.3)	27.2 (−2.7)	54.7 (12.6)
Daily mean °F (°C)	13.8 (−10.1)	17.3 (−8.2)	29.2 (−1.6)	43.5 (6.4)	56.1 (13.4)	65.6 (18.7)	71.2 (21.8)	70.1 (21.2)	60.1 (15.6)	45.6 (7.6)	30.2 (−1.0)	18.3 (−7.6)	43.4 (6.3)
Mean daily minimum °F (°C)	4.4 (−15.3)	7.7 (−13.5)	19.0 (−7.2)	31.2 (−0.4)	43.3 (6.3)	53.6 (12.0)	58.5 (14.7)	56.4 (13.6)	47.1 (8.4)	34.3 (1.3)	20.6 (−6.3)	9.3 (−12.6)	32.1 (0.1)
Record low °F (°C)	−34 (−37)	−34 (−37)	−29 (−34)	−5 (−21)	17 (−8)	32 (0)	39 (4)	32 (0)	21 (−6)	0 (−18)	−20 (−29)	−36 (−38)	−36 (−38)
Average precipitation inches (mm)	0.28 (7.1)	0.29 (7.4)	0.51 (13)	1.00 (25)	2.73 (69)	3.73 (95)	2.50 (64)	2.08 (53)	1.57 (40)	1.15 (29)	0.56 (14)	0.31 (7.9)	16.71 (424)
Average snowfall inches (cm)	9.8 (25)	5.4 (14)	6.1 (15)	4.5 (11)	0.7 (1.8)	0.0 (0.0)	0.0 (0.0)	0.0 (0.0)	0.1 (0.25)	1.2 (3.0)	9.2 (23)	8.1 (21)	45.1 (115)
Average precipitation days (≥ 0.01 in)	5.5	4.2	5.3	7.3	10.2	12.1	9.8	8.1	7.0	6.9	5.2	5.6	87.2
Average snowy days (≥ 0.1 in)	8.1	5.6	3.7	2.3	0.3	0.1	0.0	0.0	0.2	1.1	6.2	7.8	35.4
Source: NOAA

== Demographics ==
Historical population
Census	Pop.	Note	%±
1890	575		—
1900	1,277		122.1%
1910	6,188		384.6%
1920	10,476		69.3%
1930	16,099		53.7%
1940	16,577		3.0%
1950	22,032		32.9%
1960	30,604		38.9%
1970	32,290		5.5%
1980	32,843		1.7%
1990	34,544		5.2%
2000	36,567		5.9%
2010	40,888		11.8%
2020	48,377		18.3%
2023 (est.)	47,373		−2.1%
U.S. Decennial Census; 2020 Census

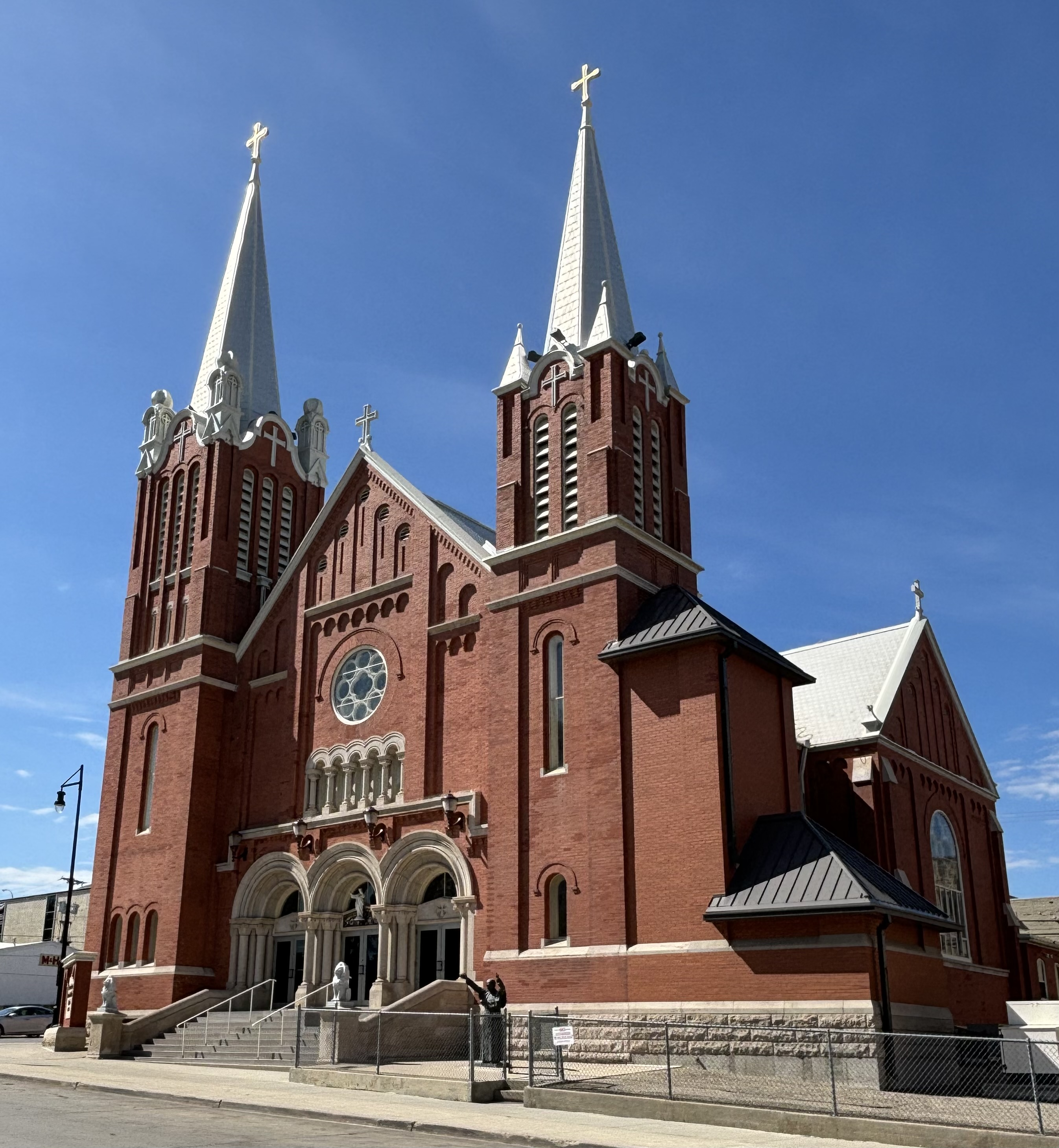
St. Leo the Great Catholic Church

=== Racial and ethnic composition ===
Minot, North Dakota – racial and ethnic composition Note: the US Census treats Hispanic/Latino as an ethnic category. This table excludes Latinos from the racial categories and assigns them to a separate category. Hispanics/Latinos may be of any race.
Race / ethnicity (NH = non-Hispanic)	Pop. 2000	Pop. 2010	Pop. 2020	% 2000	% 2010	% 2020
White alone (NH)	33,798	36,294	37,619	92.43%	88.76%	77.76%
Black or African American alone (NH)	471	880	2,404	1.29%	2.15%	4.97%
Native American or Alaska Native alone (NH)	979	1,244	1,293	2.68%	3.04%	2.67%
Asian alone (NH)	225	358	886	0.62%	0.88%	1.83%
Pacific Islander alone (NH)	19	36	89	0.05%	0.09%	0.18%
Other race alone (NH)	15	20	157	0.04%	0.05%	0.32%
Mixed race or multiracial (NH)	521	939	2,623	1.42%	2.30%	5.42%
Hispanic or Latino (any race)	539	1,117	3,306	1.47%	2.73%	6.83%
Total	36,567	40,888	48,377	100.00%	100.00%	100.00%

=== 2020 census ===
As of the 2020 census, there were 48,377 people, 21,152 households, and 11,385 families residing in the city. The median age was 32.9 years. 22.8% of residents were under the age of 18, 6.3% were under 5, and 14.0% were 65 years of age or older. For every 100 females there were 102.3 males, and for every 100 females age 18 and over there were 102.3 males age 18 and over.

About 99.9% of residents lived in urban areas, while 0.1% lived in rural areas.

Of these households, 27.3% had children under the age of 18 living in them. Of all households, 39.3% were married-couple households, 25.8% were households with a male householder and no spouse or partner present, and 26.7% were households with a female householder and no spouse or partner present. About 37.1% of all households were made up of individuals and 10.5% had someone living alone who was 65 years of age or older.

There were 23,447 housing units, of which 9.8% were vacant; the population density was 1,774.9 inhabitants per square mile (685.3/km^{2}), and housing units averaged 860.3 inhabitants per square mile (332.2/km^{2}). The homeowner vacancy rate was 2.5% and the rental vacancy rate was 10.7%.

Racial composition as of the 2020 census
Race	Number	Percent
White	38,548	79.7%
Black or African American	2,503	5.2%
American Indian and Alaska Native	1,398	2.9%
Asian	910	1.9%
Native Hawaiian and Other Pacific Islander	93	0.2%
Some other race	983	2.0%
Two or more races	3,942	8.1%
Hispanic or Latino (of any race)	3,306	6.8%

=== 2010 census ===
As of the 2010 census, there were 40,888 people, 17,863 households, and 9,978 families residing in the city. The population density was 2,346.1 inhabitants per square mile (905.8/km^{2}). There were 18,744 housing units at an average density of 1,075.4 per square mile (415.2/km^{2}). The racial makeup of the city was 90.16% White, 2.28% African American, 3.25% Native American, 0.92% Asian, 0.10% Pacific Islander, 0.64% from some other races, and 2.65% from two or more races. Hispanic or Latino people of any race were 2.73% of the population.

There were 17,863 households, of which 26.3% had children under the age of 18 living with them, 42.1% were married couples living together, 9.6% had a female householder with no husband present, 4.1% had a male householder with no wife present, and 44.1% were non-families. Of all households 34.9% were made up of individuals, and 11.7% had someone living alone who was 65 years of age or older. The average household size was 2.20 and the average family size was 2.86.

The median age in the city was 33.8 years. 21.1% of residents were under the age of 18; 14% were between the ages of 18 and 24; 26.7% were from 25 to 44; 23.2% were from 45 to 64; and 15% were 65 years of age or older. The gender makeup of the city was 49.3% male and 50.7% female.

=== 2000 census ===
As of the 2000 census, there were 36,567 people, 15,520 households, and 9,265 families residing in the city. The population density was 2,513.1 inhabitants per square mile (970.3/km^{2}). There were 16,475 housing units at an average density of 1,132.3 inhabitants per square mile (437.2/km^{2}). The racial makeup of the city was 93.18% White, 1.34% African American, 2.76% Native American, 0.62% Asian, 0.07% Pacific Islander, 0.49% from some other races, and 1.54% from two or more races. Hispanic or Latino people of any race were 1.47% of the population.

The most populous ancestry groups in the city are German (40.8%), Norwegian (32.3%), Irish (8.7%), English (5.4%), Swedish (4.2%) and French (3.2%).

There were 15,520 households, of which 28.6% had children under the age of 18 living with them, 46.6% were married couples living together, 10.0% had a female householder with no husband present, and 40.3% were non-families. Of all households 32.5% were made up of individuals, and 12.0% had someone living alone who was 65 years of age or older. The average household size was 2.27 and the average family size was 2.90.

In the city the population was spread out, with 23.2% under the age of 18, 13.3% from 18 to 24, 27.4% from 25 to 44, 20.7% from 45 to 64, and 15.4% who were 65 years of age or older. The median age was 35 years. For every 100 females, there were 93.1 males. For every 100 females age 18 and over, there were 89.0 males.

As of 2000 the median income for a household was $32,218, and the median income for a family was $42,804. Males had a median income of $30,283 versus $20,023 for females. The per capita income for the city was $18,011. About 8.8% of families and 12.8% of the population were below the poverty line, including 16.0% of those under age 18 and 8.9% of those age 65 or over.

=== 2022 American Community Survey ===
As of the 2022 American Community Survey, there are 21,161 estimated households in Minot with an average of 2.21 persons per household. The city has a median household income of $75,545. Approximately 11.3% of the city's population lives at or below the poverty line. Minot has an estimated 66.6% employment rate, with 30.0% of the population holding a bachelor's degree or higher and 93.4% holding a high school diploma.

The top five reported ancestries (people were allowed to report up to two ancestries, thus the figures will generally add to more than 100%) were English (93.6%), Spanish (2.0%), Indo-European (1.6%), Asian and Pacific Islander (1.6%), and Other (1.2%).

The median age in the city was 33.0 years.

== Economy ==
According to the city's 2022 Comprehensive Annual Financial Report, the largest employers in the city are:

#	Employer	# of Employees
1	Minot Air Force Base	12,123
2	Trinity Health	2,850
3	Minot Public Schools	1,047
4	Minot State University	561
5	City of Minot	437
6	Hess	380
7	Cognizant (ING Minot Service Center)	372 (2018)
8	Delta Vacations	367
9	Ward County	367
10	MLT Inc.	366 (2019)
11	Marketplace Foods	313 (2020)
12	Kalix (MVAW)	279
13	BNSF Railroad	230
14	Grand Hotel/International Inn	219 (2018)
15	Ryan Family Dealerships	204 (2020)
Total		18,641

Minot's economy predominantly centers around the Air Force Base 13 miles (21 km) north of town, making the city's economy more robust than other cities of its size due to its large service area.

ING/ReliaStar established a service center in Minot in December 1998.

Minot has seen a significant increase in population and infrastructure investments in the last several years with the expanding drilling (using hydrofracking) of oil in the Bakken Formation and Three Forks Groups. The State of North Dakota has a website detailing daily oil activity.

== Arts and culture ==
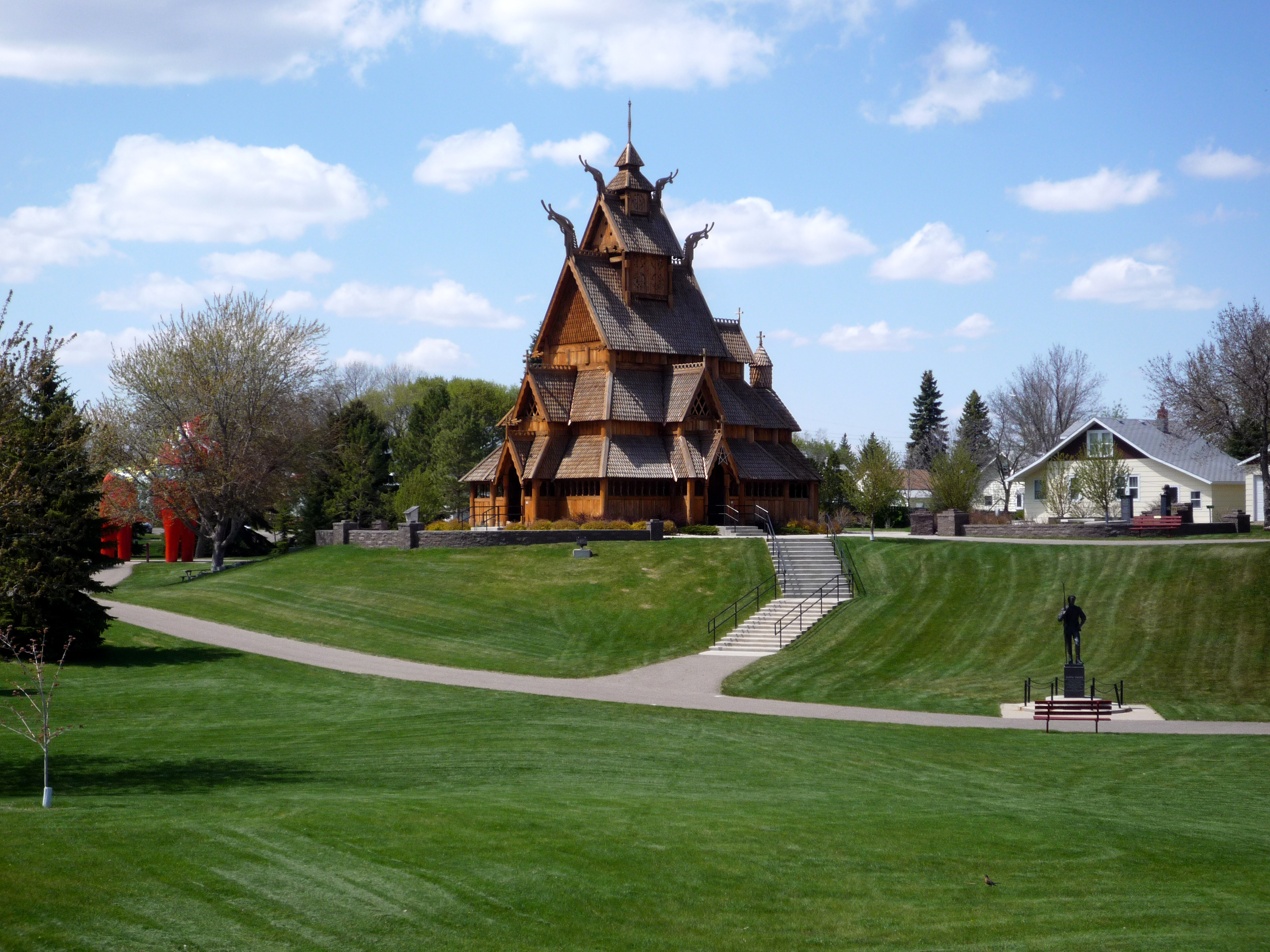
Scandinavian Heritage Park

Minot's arts community includes an art museum, a symphony orchestra, an opera company, a city band, several dance and theater troupes: over 40 organizations claim membership in the Minot Area Council on the Arts.

Nearly 40% of the city's residents are of Scandinavian ancestry, and every October since 1977 to 2025, Minot was the host to the Norsk Høstfest, North America's largest Scandinavian-American festival. Scandinavian Heritage Park is located in Minot. Scandinavian Heritage Park features remembrances and replicas from each of the Scandinavian countries: Norway, Sweden and Denmark, as well as Finland and Iceland.

=== Sites of interest ===
- Arlene Theater, a performing arts center, where the Mouse River Players perform
- Dakota Territory Air Museum is an aircraft museum near the airport. It contains many war and civilian aircraft.
- Maysa Arena, an all-purpose, year-round skating facility operated by the Minot Park District with three sheets of ice under one roof.
- Scandinavian Heritage Park is home to the Minot Visitor Center, as well as buildings based on the Scandinavian styles of architecture, including a Stave Church. The grounds are home to the Minot's Arts in the Park series.
- Old Soo Depot Transportation Museum, museum and research center in the restored 1912 Soo Line Depot.
- North Dakota State Fair Center, located on the state fairgrounds, is home to many of the city's largest events, including: The North Dakota State Fair, the Norsk Høstfest, the Big One craft show, the KMOT Ag Expo, and the Great Tomato Festival. It also hosts rodeos, and college hockey games.
- Roosevelt Park and Zoo
- Taube Museum of Art, located in the 1906 Union National Bank Building, features exhibit space in the Main Gallery and the Lower Gallery, which change every four to six weeks.

== Sports ==
- The Minot Hot Tots are a Northwoods League baseball team created in 2022. They play their games at Corbett Field.
- The Minot Honeybees are a Northwoods League softball team created in 2024. They were league runners-up in 2025. They play their games at Corbett Field.
- The Minot Mallards were a Mandak League baseball team from 1917 to 1997 that played their games at Corbett Field.
- The Souris Valley Sabre Dogs, an Expedition League baseball team, played their games at Corbett Field.
- The Minot Minotauros, an NAHL team, play their games at Maysa Arena.
- The Minot Muskies, played one season with the American West Hockey League and played their games at All Seasons Arena.
- The Minot Americans were an SJHL hockey club from 1987 to 1994, playing their games primarily at All Seasons Arena.
- The Minot Top Guns were an SJHL hockey club from 1994 to 1997, playing their games primarily at All Seasons Arena.
- Other semi-professional hockey clubs calling Minot home were the Minot Raiders/Rangers (1975–1977) and the Minot Maple Leafs (1985–1986).
- The Minot Skyrockets, a former Continental Basketball Association team, played their games at Minot Municipal Auditorium.
- The Minot State Beavers play ice hockey at All Seasons Arena, baseball at Corbett Field, football at Herb Parker Stadium and basketball at the MSU Dome.
- The Mouse River Rollers play roller derby at different locations around the city, including the Maysa Arena.
- Minot is home to several municipal sports venues including the All Seasons Arena, Corbett Field, Maysa Arena and the Minot Municipal Auditorium.

== Parks and recreation ==
The Minot Park District operates seventeen parks with various facilities; Corbett Field, home to American Legion, high school and college baseball; Optimist soccer complex; MAYSA ice arena; the Sertoma Complex which has 8 softball fields; Souris Valley Golf Course, and an indoor tennis complex.

The city's largest parks are Roosevelt Park and Oak Park. Roosevelt Park Zoo is one of the top zoos in the region. Dogs are allowed in Roosevelt Park, a sign is posted at the entrance confirming this. A "bark park" for dogs opened in the summer of 2005.

The North Dakota State Fair is held in July annually, in Minot. Nearly all recreation areas however are closed during the long winters. The local high school hockey teams use the ice rink located in the Fair Grounds. The ice rink is also turned into the location of the rodeo.

Apple Grove Golf Course, and Souris Valley Golf Course are located in Minot.

== Government ==
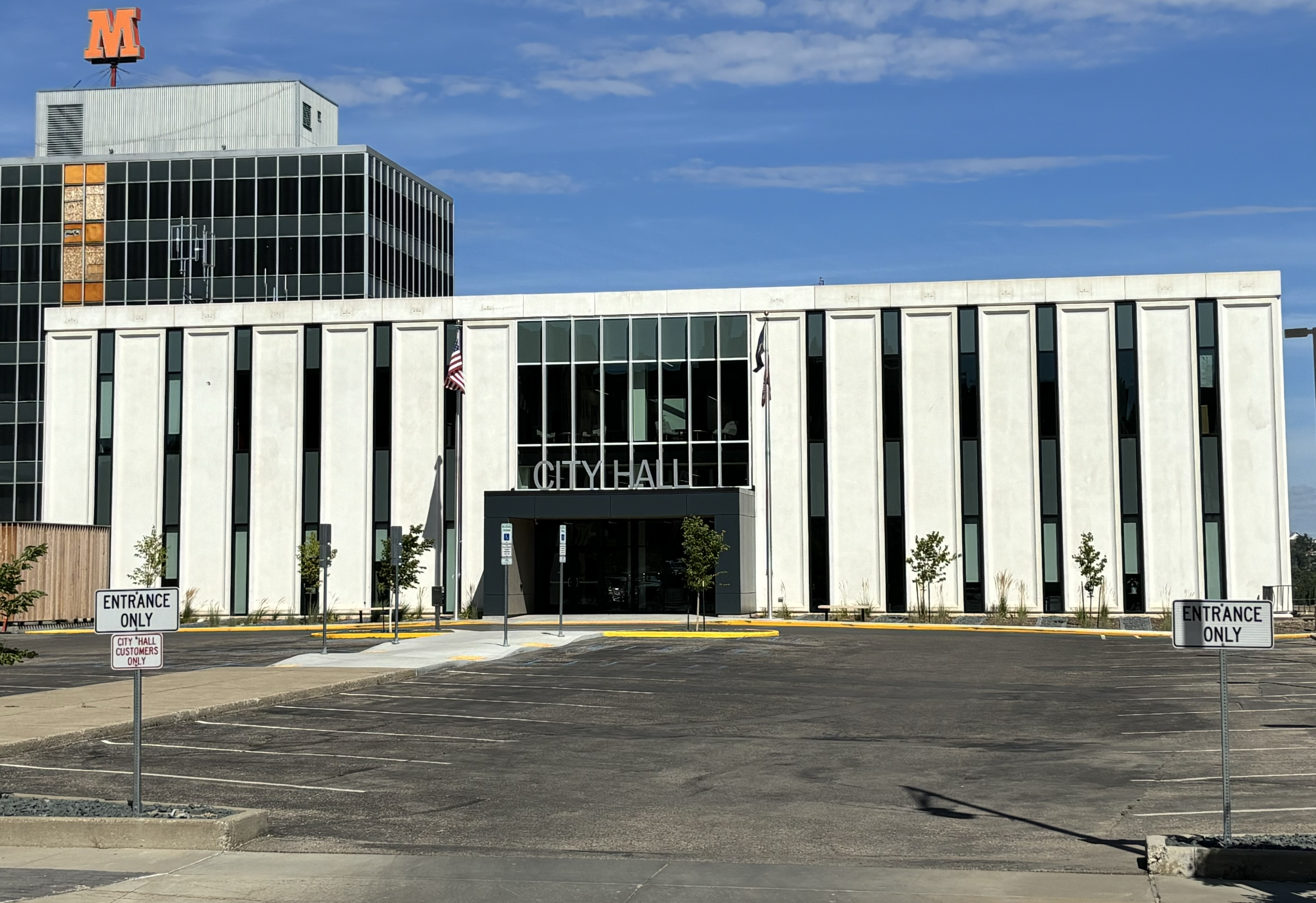
Minot city hall

The city council president is Mark Jantzer.

=== Northwest Area Water Supply ===
The Northwest Area Water Supply (NAWS) has had disputes with the Canadian government over a plan calling for water to be pumped from Lake Sakakawea, then to Minot for treatment, and then to large stretches of Northwest North Dakota.

== Education ==
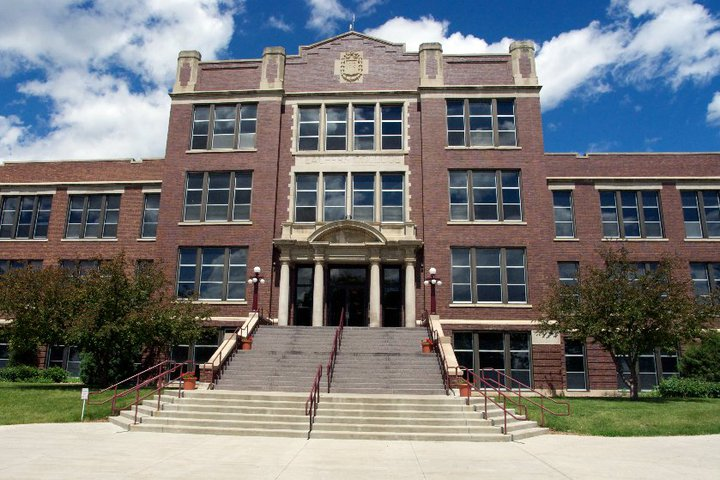
Minot State University

The Minot Public Schools system operates ten elementary schools (K–5) in the city: Bel Air, Edison, John Hoeven, Lewis and Clark, Longfellow, McKinley Roosevelt, Perkett, Sunnyside, and Washington. The district also operates Bell Elementary, about 5 miles (8.0 km) southeast of Minot. Jefferson Elementary closed in 2003. The old Washington Elementary building closed in 2007 and the students moved to a new building that was renovated from an old health care center. Both Bell Elementary and McKinley Elementary would be closed in 2024 due to funding issues. There are also two elementary schools (K–6) on the Minot Air Force Base: Dakota and North Plains. The 2011 flood resulted in the relocation of Erik Ramstad Middle School and the closure of Lincoln Elementary, as both buildings were damaged beyond economical repair. Longfellow Elementary was expanded after the flood and children who lived in the Lincoln neighborhood then attended Longfellow Elementary.

There are four middle schools in the system. The three in Minot are grades 6–8: Jim Hill in the south, Erik Ramstad in the north, and Central Middle School downtown. Memorial Middle School on Minot AFB is named for fallen veterans of the U.S. Armed Forces. The school was built in the mid-1960s on the base's northern perimeter.

The city has two public high schools. On the southwest side of the city is Minot High School, constructed in 1973 just west of Jim Hill Middle School. On the north side of the city is Minot North High School, completed in 2024. MPS also operates an adult learning center and Souris River Campus, an alternative high school.

Private schools in Minot include Bishop Ryan Catholic School, which offers preschool through grade 12 at a single campus; and Our Redeemer's Christian School, a Protestant K–12 school.

Minot is also home to Minot State University, the state's third-largest university. MSU's campus is at the base of North Hill, just west of Broadway. It was a two-year teacher's college when it opened in 1913, and it was designated university in 1987.

== Media ==
Minot has several media outlets. KMOT-TV, KXMC-TV and the Minot Daily News report on local news daily. KCJB, KHRT, and Prairie Public have some local news content, but no active journalists.

=== Radio ===
Minot is served by 15 radio stations (3 AM, 12 FM). Bottineau-based Programmer's Broadcasting owns KTZU and KWGO, along with KBTO of Bottineau. Prairie Public Radio operates KMPR FM 88.9, a community broadcaster based in Burlington operates a low-power FM station, and the remainder are nonprofit Christian stations, of which only KHRT is local.

iHeartMedia owns and operates all the commercial stations licensed to Minot itself: KCJB 910, KRRZ 1390, KYYX 97.1, KIZZ 93.7, KMXA-FM 99.9, and KZPR 105.3. This concentration of broadcasting in the hands of a single owner has led to criticism.

==== AM frequencies ====
- 910 KCJB: "91 Country" Classic Country/Talk
- 1390 KRRZ: "Cars" Classic hits

==== FM frequencies ====
- 88.9 KMPR: Prairie Public Radio
- 91.1 K216EE: Real Presence Radio Christian
- 91.9 K220GC: Air1 Christian
- 93.7 KIZZ: "Z94" Top 40
- 94.9 KTZU: "The Zoo" Classic rock
- 97.1 KYYX: "97 Kicks" Country
- 98.1 KOWW-LP: "The Cowlip" eclectic community broadcaster (Burlington, North Dakota)
- 99.9 KMXA-FM: "Mix 99.9" Adult Contemporary
- 100.7 KNDL: K-Love Christian
- 102.9 KWGO: "W-G-O" Country
- 104.1 KSAF-LP: LifeTalk Radio Christian
- 105.3 KZPR: "The Fox" Active Rock
- 106.9 KHTZ: "K-Hits 106" Classic Hits

==== Other stations ====
Additionally, the following stations are not based in Minot, but generally have a clear signal into town:

- 550 AM KFYR: "K-Fire" from Bismarck (News/Talk/Sports)
- 710 AM KXMR: ESPN, also from Bismarck (Sports)
- 1410 AM KDKT: "Fox Sports Radio 1410" also from Bismarck (Sports)
- 101.9 FM KBTO: "Sunny 101.9" from Bottineau (Country)

=== Television ===
Minot has six television stations, most of which have ATSC (digital) transmitters:

- KSRE (ATSC RF channel 40); virtual channels 6.1 PBS, 6.2 World, 6.3 Minnesota Channel, 6.4 Lifelong Learning
- KMOT (ATSC RF channel 10); virtual channels 10.1 NBC, 10.2 Fox, 10.3 MeTV
- KXMC-TV (ATSC RF channel 13); virtual channels 13.1 The CW
- KMCY (ATSC RF channel 14); virtual channels 14.1 ABC, 14.2 CBS, 14.3 MyNetworkTV
- KNDM (ATSC RF channel 24); virtual channels 24.1 BEK Sports

=== Print ===
The principal local newspaper is the Minot Daily News, which publishes six days a week. The Minot Air Force Base also has a weekly newspaper printed, The Northern Sentry. It is a free publication published on Fridays by BHG, Inc. out of Garrison, North Dakota available on the MAFB, as well as the surrounding communities and many locations within Minot. The Minot State University student newspaper Red & Green is published once a week (Thursdays) during the regular school year, but not during the summer months. Morgan Printing produces the Lunch Letter three days a week on a double-sided leaflet. There is one weekly classified-ad publication, the Trading Post, printed by the Minot Daily News. The Bismarck Tribune is available at several outlets in the city, as is The Forum, to a lesser extent. am

== Transportation ==
=== Railroads ===
The railroads that built Minot remain, though Great Northern is now part of the BNSF Railway and the Soo Line is run by the Canadian Pacific Kansas City.

Passenger rail transportation is provided on Amtrak's Empire Builder line, connecting Chicago with Portland and Seattle, which stops at the Minot Amtrak station. Trains make a 20-minute refueling and crew change stop in Minot. Westbound trains are scheduled to arrive daily at 9:06 am local time; eastbound trains are scheduled to arrive daily at 10:53 pm.

=== Highways ===
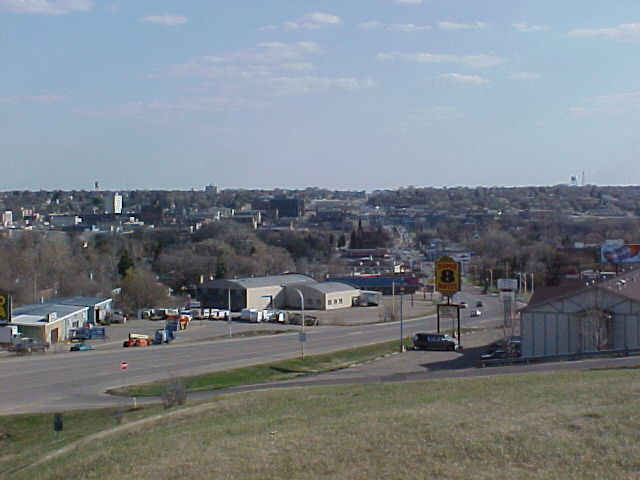
US 83 running through north Minot

Three major U.S. highways run through the city, connecting it to Canada, Montana, and two interstates: US 2, US 52, and US 83.

US 2 runs east–west and is a four-lane divided highway from Minot east to Grand Forks and beyond as well as west to Williston and into Montana. Minot is midpoint along the North Dakota segment of US 2.

US 83 runs north–south through central Minot as Broadway. It is a four-lane divided highway from Minot south to Bismarck and north to Minot Air Force Base. Just north of the main gate at the base, the road reduces to two lanes and crosses the Canada–US border at Westhope, ND, where it becomes Manitoba Highway 83.

US 52 is a two-lane highway that runs southeast–northwest. Southeast from Minot, it follows a slightly circuitous route to Jamestown. US 52 then merges with Interstate 94 (I-94) after Jamestown, heading due east to Fargo. Northwest from Minot, US 52 crosses the Canada–US border at Portal, ND/North Portal, SK, where it becomes Saskatchewan Highway 39.

The Minot Bypass follows alternate alignments of these roads around the city in its northwest and northeast quadrants, with southwest and southeast bypasses in preliminary planning stages.

=== Airport ===
Minot International Airport is served by three airlines as well as charters and air taxi service around North Dakota.

=== Transit ===
Local transit is provided by Minot City Transit.

== Notable people ==
- Dale Brown (1935-2026), LSU Tigers men's basketball coach; born and raised in Minot
- Gary Cederstrom (born 1955), retired Major League Baseball umpire
- Jonny Craig (born 1986), singer; born in Minot
- Josh Duhamel (born 1972), actor; born and raised in Minot
- Joseph Enright, U.S. Navy submarine commander in World War II
- Mark Friese (born 1969), justice of the North Dakota Supreme Court
- Tim Jackman (born 1981), professional hockey player; born in Minot
- Gary Johnson (born 1953), governor of New Mexico; born in Minot
- Wiz Khalifa (born 1987), rapper, singer, songwriter and actor; born at Minot Air Force Base
- Kevin Miller (born 1977), voice actor; born in Minot
- Michael H. Miller (born 1952), US Navy Vice Admiral, 61st Superintendent of the US Naval Academy
- Ken Paxton (born 1962), attorney general of Texas; born in Minot
- Lauren Poe, former mayor of Gainesville, Florida; born in Minot
- Greg Raymer (born 1964), professional poker player; born in Minot
- Donny Schatz (born 1977), sprint car racing driver
- Ashton Smith (born 1962), movie trailer king

== Sister cities ==
Minot maintains a sister city relationship with the Norwegian city of Skien.

Minot is also a sister city of Moose Jaw, Saskatchewan, about 300 miles (480 km) to the northwest. The cities share many qualities, including their size, location on river valleys, historical origins, and air force bases.

== See also ==
- Minot Why Nots
