= KHTZ-FM =

Radio station in Minot, North Dakota

Coordinates: 48°9′48″N 101°17′56.6″W

KHTZ
- Minot, North Dakota; United States
- Broadcast area: Minot, North Dakota
- Frequency: 106.9 MHz (HD Radio)
- Branding: K-Hits 106

Programming
- Format: Classic hits

Ownership
- Owner: Joseph Goldade; (RadioDifferently LLC)

History
- First air date: June 1992 (as KHRT-FM)
- Former call signs: KHRT-FM (1992-2025)
- Call sign meaning: "K-Hits"

Technical information
- Licensing authority: FCC
- Facility ID: 20488
- Class: C2
- ERP: 50,000 watts
- HAAT: 105 meters (344 ft)

Links
- Public license information: Public file; LMS
- Website: khits106.com

KHTZ (106.9 FM) is a radio station located in Minot, North Dakota. It is owned by Joseph Goldade's RadioDifferently LLC.

From 1992 until 2024, KHRT-FM was a contemporary Christian music station owned by Faith Broadcasting Inc.; it was one of two Christian radio stations in Minot, along with co-owned KHRT. The KHRT stations ceased operations in 2024 for financial reasons; KHRT-FM was sold to Goldade in 2025 and relaunched as KHTZ on April 1.

== History ==
The initial application for the station was submitted by Richard B. Leavitt's Faith Broadcasting Inc., on February 24, 1987; the construction permit was granted on December 13, 1990, and the call sign KHRT-FM was assigned on January 18, 1991. The station began regular broadcasting in June 1992 with a contemporary Christian music format, operating from a 400-foot (120 m) tower south of Minot. KHRT-FM concentrated on a Christian hot AC format, and also aired satellite-fed programming from Salem Communications during overnights and weekends. Although classified as a commercial radio station by the Federal Communications Commission (FCC), Faith Broadcasting acted as a nonprofit organization using commercial advertisements for funding, though it also took donations.

On July 31, 2024, KHRT-FM, along with AM sister station KHRT, ceased operations due to lack of funding and a downturn in advertising revenue; the licenses were put up for sale. The closure came four years after the death of Dick Leavitt, who had owned KHRT AM since 1982. By then, the stations were managed by his son Roy. In December 2024, Faith Broadcasting agreed to sell KHRT-FM to RadioDifferently LLC for $250,000; principal Joe Goldade, a Minot native, previously served as an on-air host for the Reiten Radio stations and a meteorologist for KXMC-TV before relocating to Dayton, Minnesota, as a Mayo Clinic software engineer and solution architect. KHRT AM was not included in the sale and surrendered its license in February 2025.

Goldade intends to relaunch KHRT-FM with an undisclosed new name and format that will include coverage of local news and high school and college sports. On March 26, 2025, the station's call sign will change to KHTZ.

On April 1, 2025, at 8AM, following a brief tribute to the "Heart" format (in which Goldade played "Place in This World" by Michael W. Smith as a formal sign-off for the format), KHRT-FM returned to the air with a classic hits format, branded as "K-Hits 106" under new KHTZ call letters. The first songs on K-Hits were "Start Me Up" by The Rolling Stones and "Fantasy" by Mariah Carey.
