= Great Northern Depot =

The Great Northern Depot or Great Northern Passenger Depot may refer to:

== Minnesota ==
- Great Northern Passenger Depot (Alexandria, Minnesota)
- Great Northern Depot (Bemidji, Minnesota)
- Minneapolis Great Northern Depot, Minneapolis, Minnesota
- Great Northern Depot (Princeton, Minnesota)
- Great Northern Depot (Wayzata, Minnesota)

== Mississippi ==
- New Orleans Great Northern Railroad Passenger Depot, a National Register of Historic Places listing in Hinds County, Mississippi
- New Orleans Great Northern Railroad Depot, a National Register of Historic Places listing in Lawrence County, Mississippi
- New Orleans and Great Northern Railroad Depot-Tylertown, a National Register of Historic Places listing in Walthall County, Mississippi

== Montana ==
- Great Northern Railway Depot (Butte, Montana), currently a bar and night club in Butte, Montana
- Great Northern Railway Depot (Kalispell, Montana), a National Register of Historic Places listing in Flathead County, Montana
- Great Northern Railway Passenger and Freight Depot and Division Office, Whitefish, Montana

== North Dakota ==
- Great Northern Passenger Depot - Fargo
- Great Northern Freight Warehouse and Depot, Grand Forks, North Dakota
- Great Northern Railway Depot (Mayville, North Dakota)
- Great Northern Passenger Depot (Rugby, North Dakota)
- Great Northern Railway Underpass, Stanley, North Dakota

== South Dakota ==
- Great Northern Railway Passenger and Freight Depot

== Texas ==
- International & Great Northern Railroad Passenger Depot, a National Register of Historic Places listing in Milam County, Texas
- International & Great Northern Railroad Passenger Station, a National Register of Historic Places listing in Bexar County, Texas

== Washington ==
- Great Northern Depot (Anacortes, Washington), a National Register of Historic Places listing in Skagit County, Washington
- Great Northern Passenger Station (Bellingham, Washington), a National Register of Historic Places listing in Whatcom County, Washington
- Great Northern Depot (Skykomish, Washington)

== See also ==
- Great Northern Railway Steam Locomotive No. 1355 and Tender 1451, Sioux City, Iowa
- Great Northern Railway Company Bridge, Cass Lake, Minnesota, a National Register of Historic Places listing in Cass County, Minnesota
- Great Northern Implement Company, Minneapolis, Minnesota
- Great Northern Railway Buildings, Glacier National Park, Montana
- Great Northern Freight Warehouse, Fargo, North Dakota
