= Mayville station (North Dakota) =

- Great Northern Railway Depot
- U.S. National Register of Historic Places
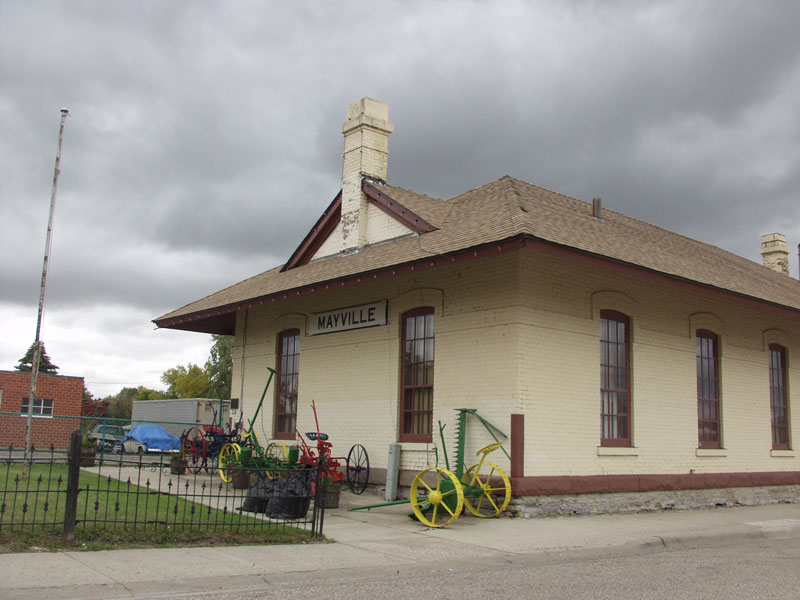

- Location within North Dakota Location within the United States
- Location: Front St., Mayville, North Dakota
- Coordinates: 47°30′0″N 97°19′26″W
- Area: less than one acre
- Built: 1897
- Built by: Great Northern Railway
- NRHP reference No.: 77001033
- Added to NRHP: October 5, 1977

Mayville station is a historic train station on Front St. in Mayville, North Dakota. It was built in 1897. It was listed on the National Register of Historic Places in 1977 as the Great Northern Railway Depot.

A predecessor building was burned in a fire. This building, as a new depot, was built in style "noticeably superior to the type of facility usually provided a community the size of Mayville."

The depot is now home to the Goose River Heritage Center, a museum of local history.

Preceding station	Great Northern Railway	Following station
Portland Junction toward Larimore	Larimore – Breckenridge	Murray toward Breckenridge
