= Fargo station =

Amtrak station in North Dakota, United States of America

Fargo, ND
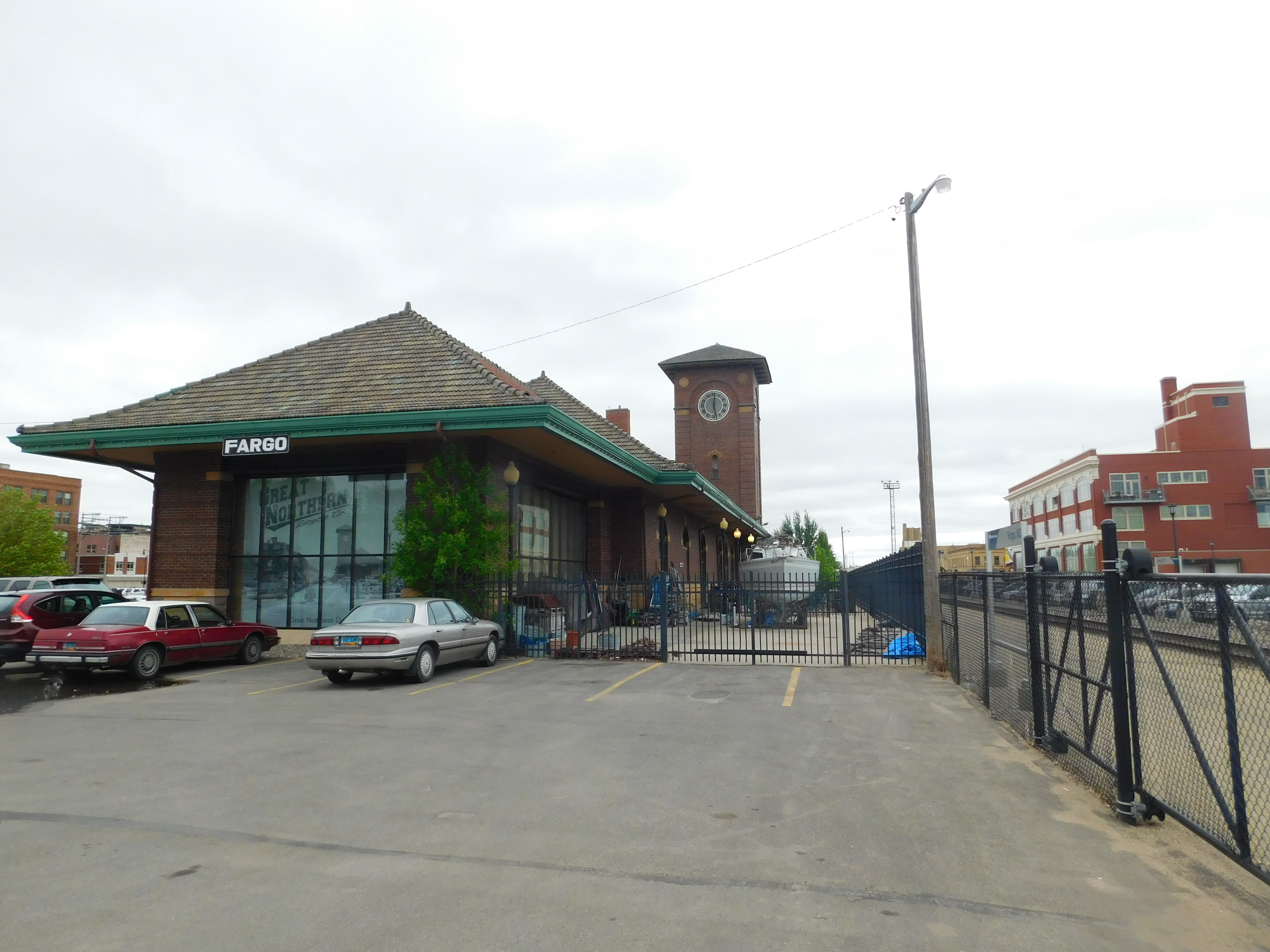
- Fargo station, May 2017. The former Great Northern depot is on the left while the closed-off platform is on the right.

General information
- Location: 420 4th Street North; Fargo, North Dakota; United States
- Coordinates: 46.8810°N 96.7861°W
- Owner: BNSF Railway
- Line: BNSF KO Subdivision
- Platforms: 1 side platform
- Tracks: 1

Construction
- Parking: Yes
- Accessible: Yes

Other information
- Station code: Amtrak: FAR

History
- Rebuilt: 1906, 1995, 2025

Passengers
- FY 2025: 17,710 (Amtrak)

Services
Preceding station	Amtrak	Following station
Grand Forks toward Seattle or Portland	Empire Builder	Detroit Lakes toward Chicago
Former services
Preceding station	Amtrak	Following station
Grand Forks toward Seattle	Empire Builder until 1979	Breckenridge toward Chicago
Valley City toward Seattle	North Coast Hiawatha	Detroit Lakes toward Chicago
Preceding station	Great Northern Railway	Following station
Harwood toward Seattle	Main Line Via Grand Forks, Wilmar	Moorhead toward St. Paul
Pinkham toward Seattle	Main Line Via New Rockford, St. Cloud	Moorhead toward St. Paul
Pinkham toward Devils Lake	Devils Lake – Fargo	Terminus
Pinkham toward Portland Junction	Portland Junction – Fargo	Terminus
- Great Northern Depot
- U.S. Historic district – Contributing property
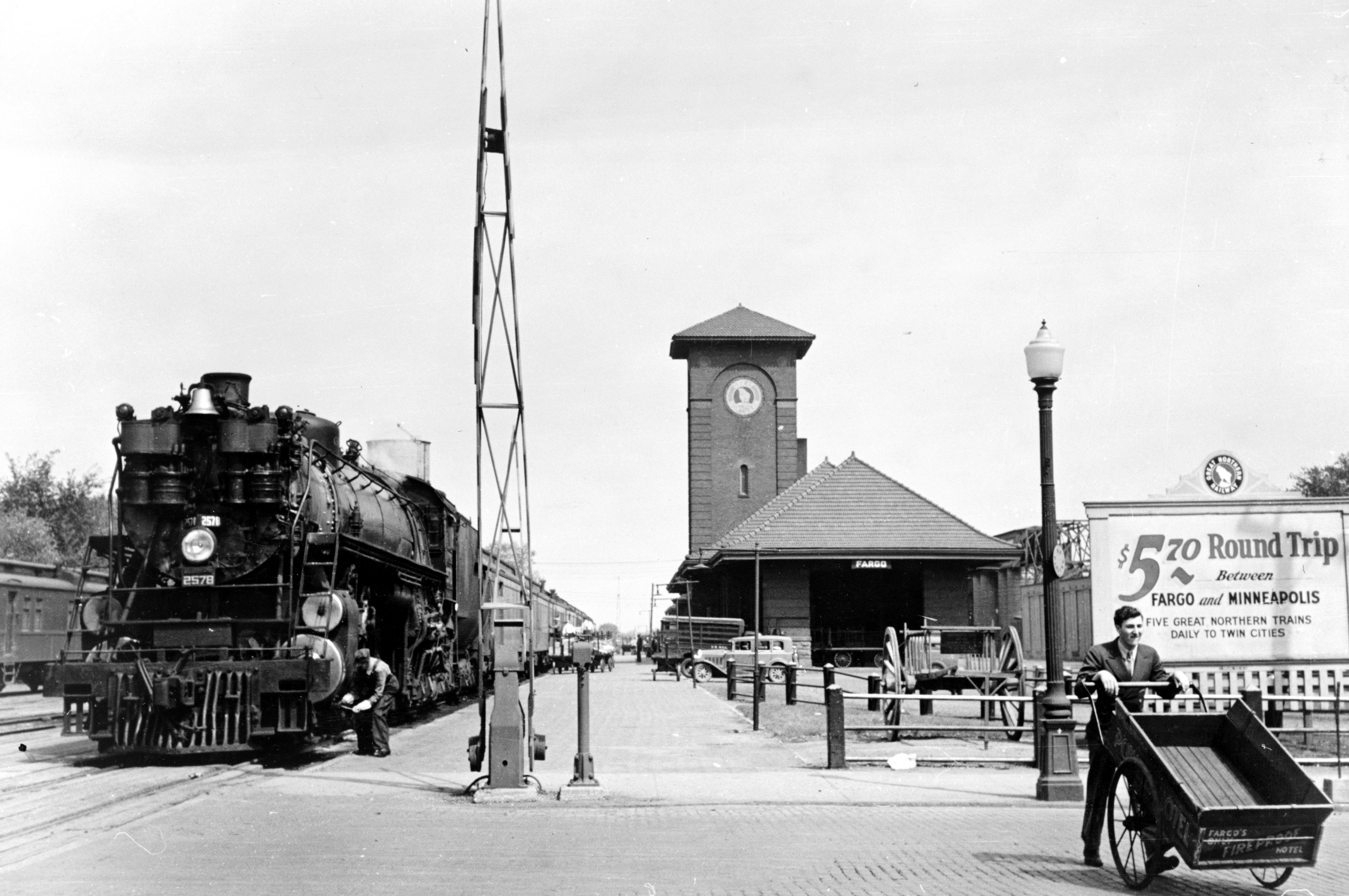
- As a Great Northern Railway Depot in the summer of 1939
- Built: 1906
- Architect: Samuel L. Bartlett
- Architectural style: Romanesque Revival
- Part of: Downtown Fargo District (ID83004064)
- Designated CP: October 13, 1983.
Location

Fargo Station is a train station in Fargo, North Dakota, United States. It is served by Amtrak's Empire Builder. It is the only railway station in use in the Fargo-Moorhead area and is the third-busiest in North Dakota. The platform, tracks, and station are currently all owned by BNSF Railway. The station is currently located in the former BNSF freight house. The former main station building is now home to Great Northern Bicycle Co.

== History ==
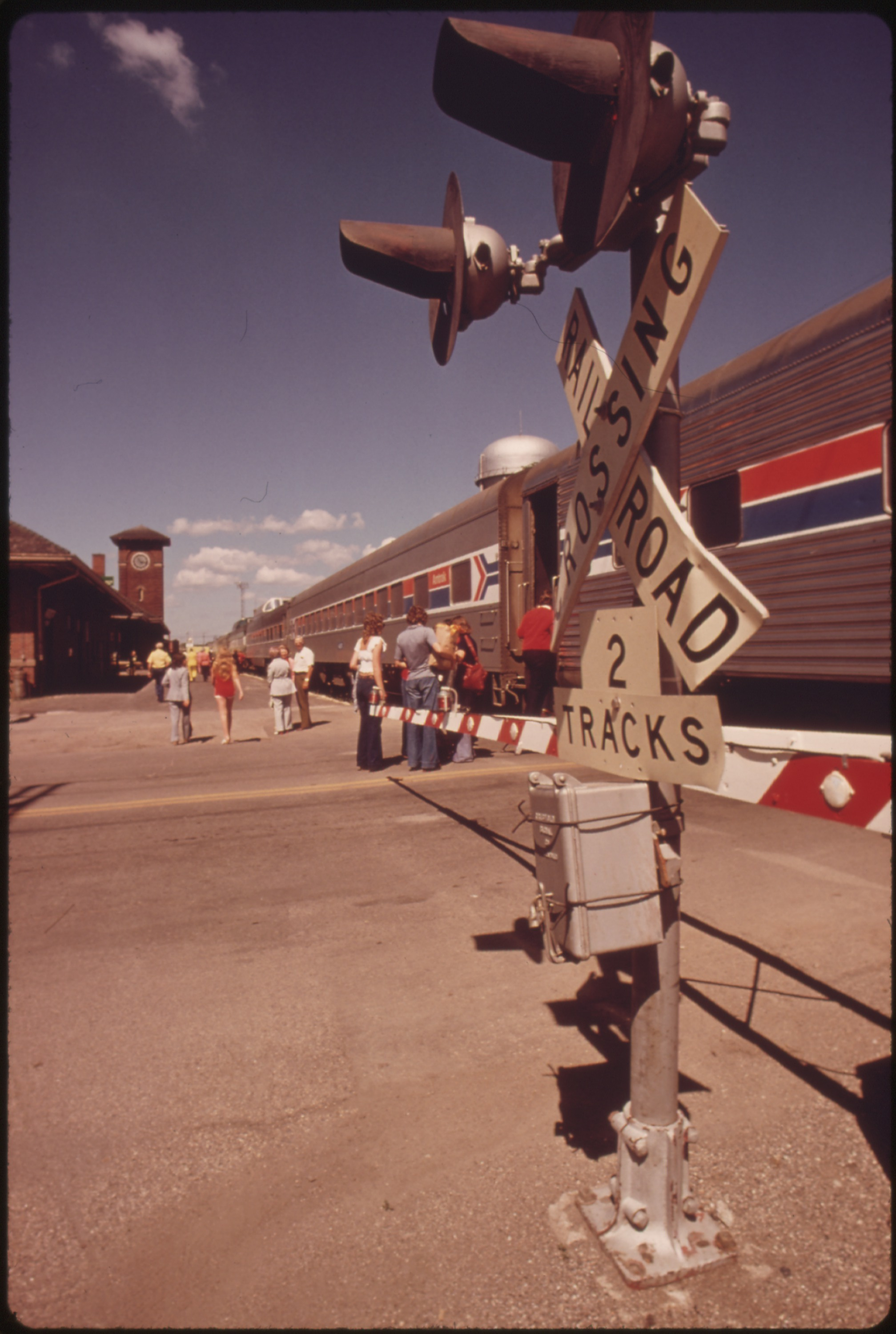
1974 Amtrak train in Fargo

Fargo station was originally built by the Great Northern Railway in 1906. It was designed by Samuel L. Bartlett in a Romanesque Revival style. He also designed other stations for the Great Northern, including stations in Minot and Rugby, North Dakota. The Great Northern also built a nearby freight warehouse in Fargo, listed on the National Register of Historic Places.

At the time of the station's construction, Fargo was served by both the Great Northern Railway and the Northern Pacific. The station was served by Great Northern trains, while Northern Pacific operated its own station along Fargo's Main Avenue.

In 1970, the two railway companies merged to form the Burlington Northern. Freight trains used the Northern Pacific tracks, while passenger trains used the Great Northern tracks. All passenger service in Fargo began using the Great Northern depot. From 1971, passenger service was operated by Amtrak. Amtrak currently uses the former BNSF freight house as the station building, as the main building became unused in 1986. The former main station building is now used for retail. Various businesses have operated in the building, since 1995.

Fargo station is listed as a contributing property on National Register of Historic Places Downtown Fargo District as the Great Northern Depot.

In 2025, Amtrak completed a $4.5 million renovation of the station to improve accessibility. The project included a 645-foot (197 m)-long platform with a snowmelt system.

== Operation ==
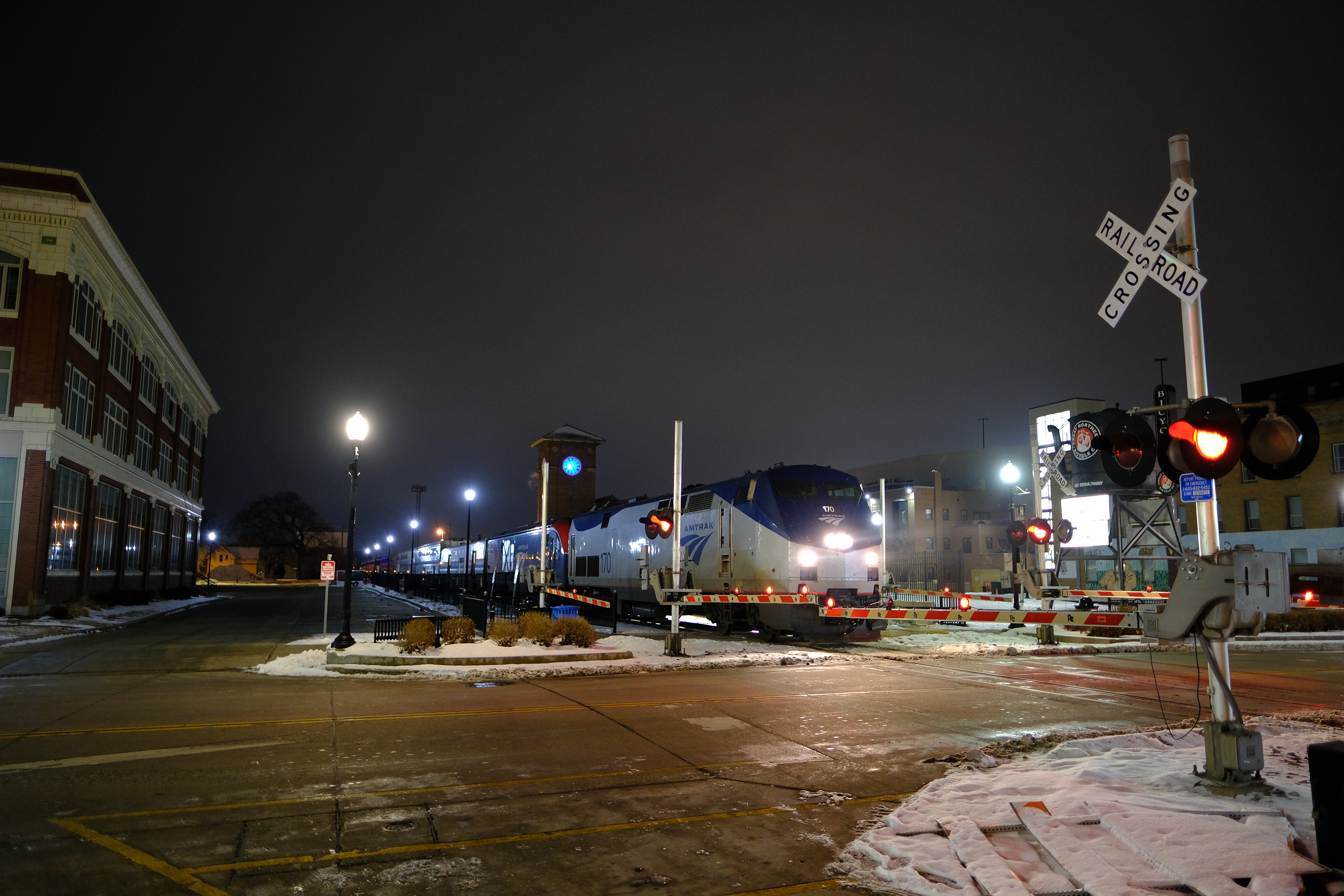
Empire Builder 7 at Fargo Station

Fargo station is served by Amtrak's Empire Builder service. Westbound trains are headed for Spokane, Washington (splitting to serve Seattle, Washington and Portland, Oregon) while eastbound trains are headed for Chicago. There are several intermittent stops between.

The station previously served the North Coast Hiawatha until that service was discontinued in 1979.

The Minnesota Department of Transportation has proposed regional rail services to connect Fargo-Moorhead with the Twin Cities in Minnesota. The route is listed as a Phase 1 project for Minnesota's regional rail projects, to be completed by 2030. Due to existing infrastructure, Fargo Amtrak station would be used.

Fargo station is served by MATBUS within one block of the station. Route 11 stops at the corner of 4th Avenue North and 5th Street North on its way from the downtown transfer hub to the Northport neighborhood in northern Fargo.

== Ridership ==
While the largest city in North Dakota, Fargo has only the third-most rail passenger traffic in the state, behind Minot and Williston. This is chiefly because Amtrak's daily Empire Builder, which makes stops in six other North Dakota cities, stops in Fargo during the middle of night—between 2 am and 4 am—on both its eastbound and westbound journeys. In Amtrak's 2010 fiscal year, an average of about 60 passengers boarded or detrained at the station each day.
