= Grand Forks station =

Grand Forks, ND
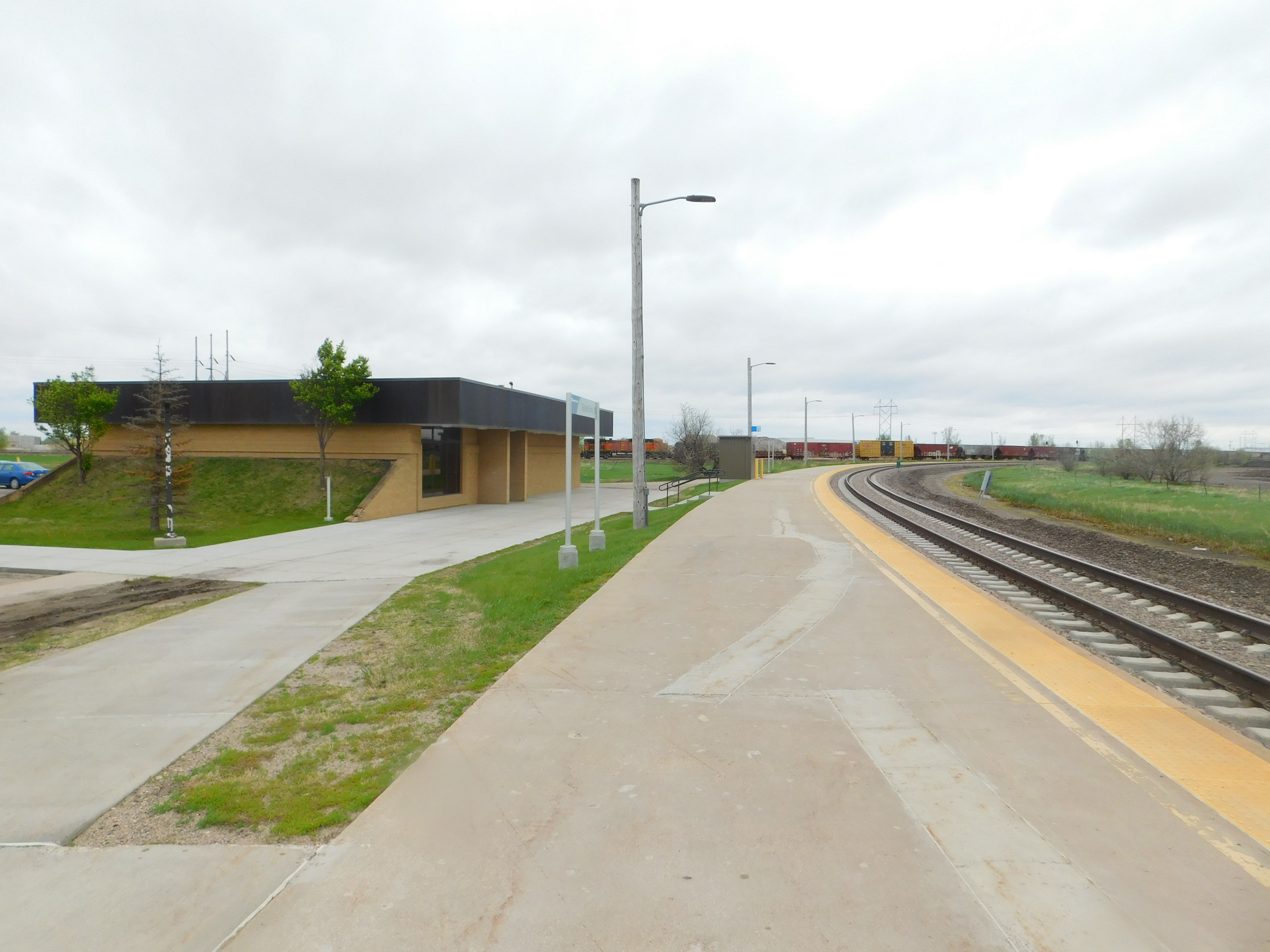
- Grand Forks station in May 2017

General information
- Location: 5555 DeMers Avenue; Grand Forks, North Dakota; United States
- Coordinates: 47.917411°N 97.110911°W
- Owner: Amtrak
- Line: BNSF Hillsboro Subdivision
- Platforms: 1 side platform
- Tracks: 1

Construction
- Parking: Yes
- Accessible: Yes

Other information
- Station code: Amtrak: GFK

History
- Opened: 1982

Passengers
- FY 2025: 11,036 (Amtrak)

Services
Preceding station	Amtrak	Following station
Devils Lake toward Seattle or Portland	Empire Builder	Fargo toward Chicago
Former services
Preceding station	Great Northern Railway	Following station
Emerado toward Seattle	Main Line	Hillsboro toward St. Paul
Location

Grand Forks station is a train station in western Grand Forks, North Dakota. It is served by Amtrak's Empire Builder line.

It is located at a railroad wye where Amtrak trains headed for Chicago turn south. The station was built in a standard design by Amtrak in 1982, replacing the use of a Great Northern station downtown and allowing Amtrak to serve the city without having to go downtown and then back up. For a while before the station officially opened, trains stopped here and passengers were bussed to and from the old station. The former Great Northern freight station has been listed on the National Register of Historic Places since 1990.

Grand Forks is served by Amtrak's daily Empire Builder. Of the seven North Dakota stations served by Amtrak, Grand Forks was the fourth busiest in FY10, boarding or detraining an average of about 55 passengers daily. The station is owned by Amtrak. The platform and tracks are owned by BNSF Railway.

Between late 2020 and November 2021, Amtrak completed a project to make the Grand Forks station compliant with the Americans with Disabilities Act of 1990.

While there is no public transit service directly serving the station as of 2022, Cities Area Transit has a bus stop located at University Avenue and North 51st Street, approximately half a mile to the northeast.

== Gallery ==
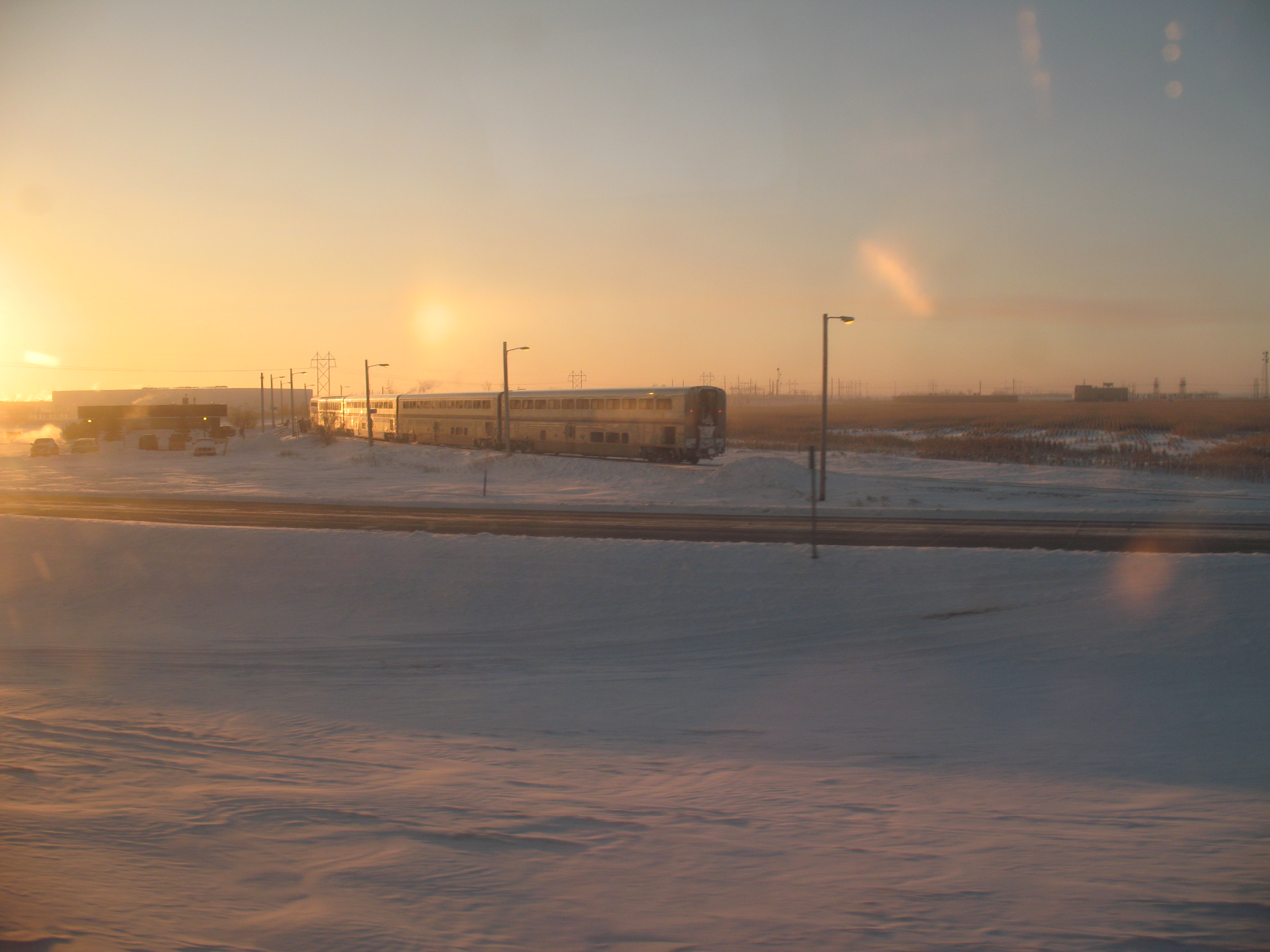
An eastbound Empire Builder pulled into the wye.
