= Reuben N. Nelson =

American politician and lawyer

Reuben N. Nelson (December 12, 1904 – March 2, 1966) was an American politician and lawyer in.

Nelson was born in Roberts County, South Dakota and went to Wheaton High School. He graduated from Hamline University and William Mitchell College of Law (formerly St. Paul College of Law). Nelson was admitted to the Minnesota bar. He lived with his wife and family in Breckenridge, Wilkin County, Minnesota. Nelson served as the Breckinridge City Attorney from 1932 to 1937 and as the Wilkin County Attorney from 1943 to 1956. He served in the Minnesota House of Representatives from 1957 until his death in 1966.
