= Wilkin County Courthouse =

- U.S. National Register of Historic Places
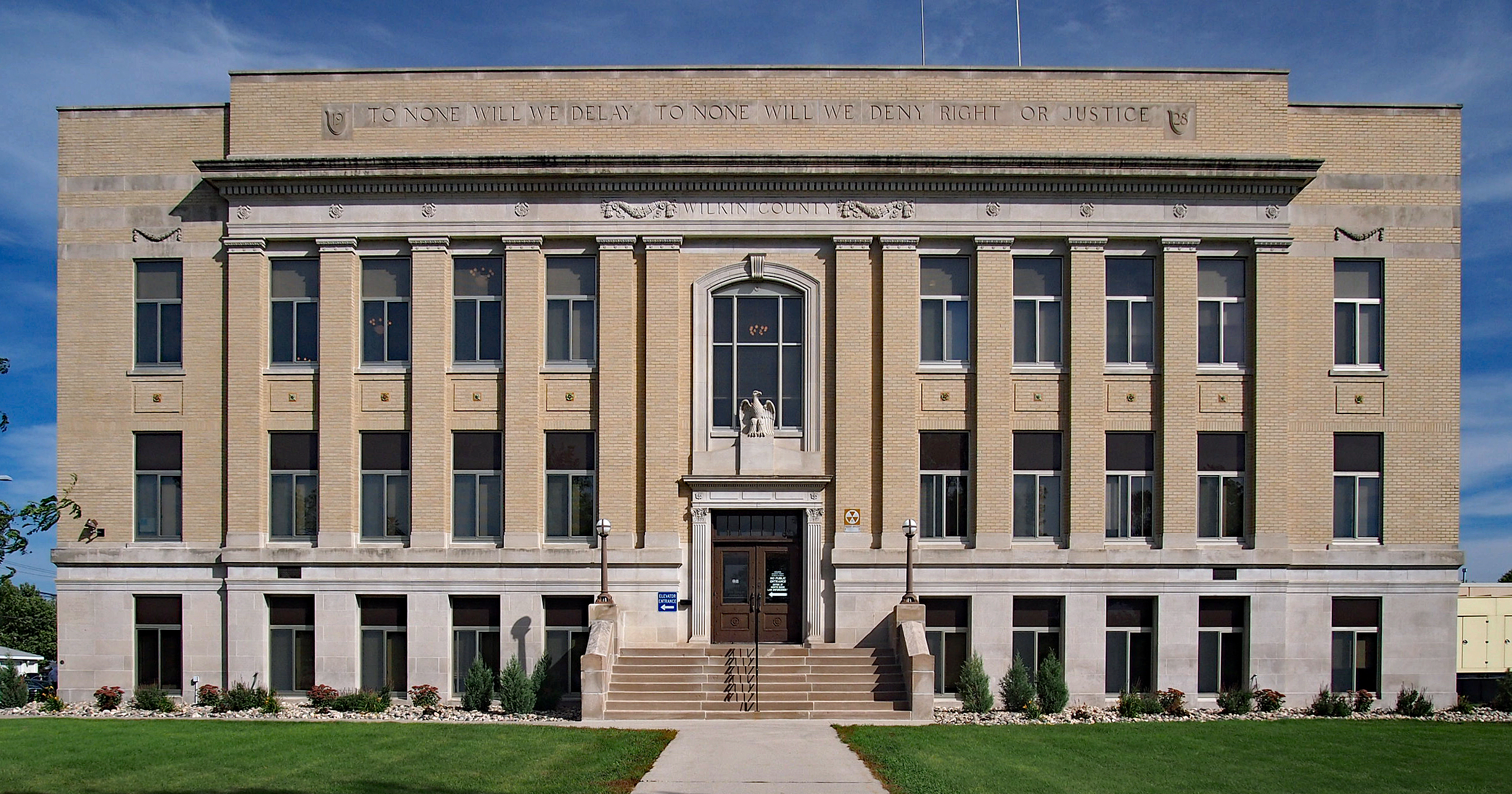
- The Wilkin County Courthouse from the west

- Location within Minnesota Location within the United States
- Interactive map showing the location of Wilkin County Courthouse
- Location: 316 5th Street S., Breckenridge, Minnesota
- Coordinates: 46°15′37.5″N 96°35′14″W
- Area: 1 acre (0.40 ha)
- Built: 1928–9
- Architect: Buechner & Orth
- Architectural style: Beaux-Arts
- MPS: Wilkin County MRA
- NRHP reference No.: 80002182
- Added to NRHP: July 17, 1980

The Wilkin County Courthouse is the primary government building of Wilkin County, Minnesota, United States, located in the city of Breckenridge. Built from 1928 to 1929, the courthouse was listed on the National Register of Historic Places in 1980 for having local significance in the themes of architecture and politics/government. It was nominated for being Wilkin County's seat of government and for its well-preserved architecture.

== Description ==
The Wilkin County Courthouse is a two-story building with a raised basement, constructed of cream-colored brick and Indiana limestone. Its architectural elements suggest Beaux-Arts style, but flattened and squared off to conform to the Moderne aesthetics of the 1920s. Tall brick pilasters extend to a cornice, which is topped by a high parapet with the inscription "To None Will We Delay, To None Will We Deny, Right or Justice." The flat roofline disguises that the building has a stained-glass dome over its central hall. Over the main doorway is a transom window and a cornice topped by a 4-foot (1.2 m) stone eagle. Other details include carved rosettes and garlands. Interior features include terrazzo floors, steel and bronze doors, ornamental plaster, pink Tennessee marble wainscoting, and brass trim. Murals represent life in 19th-century Wilkin County.

== History ==
The current building was constructed as a replacement for an 1883 courthouse that burned down in 1924. It was designed by Saint Paul architects Buechner & Orth, and the firm of Redlinger & Hanson was paid $203,492 to build it. The inscription across the top of the building is a quote from Magna Carta.

== See also ==
- List of county courthouses in Minnesota
- National Register of Historic Places listings in Wilkin County, Minnesota
