= Devils Lake station =

American train station

Devils Lake, ND
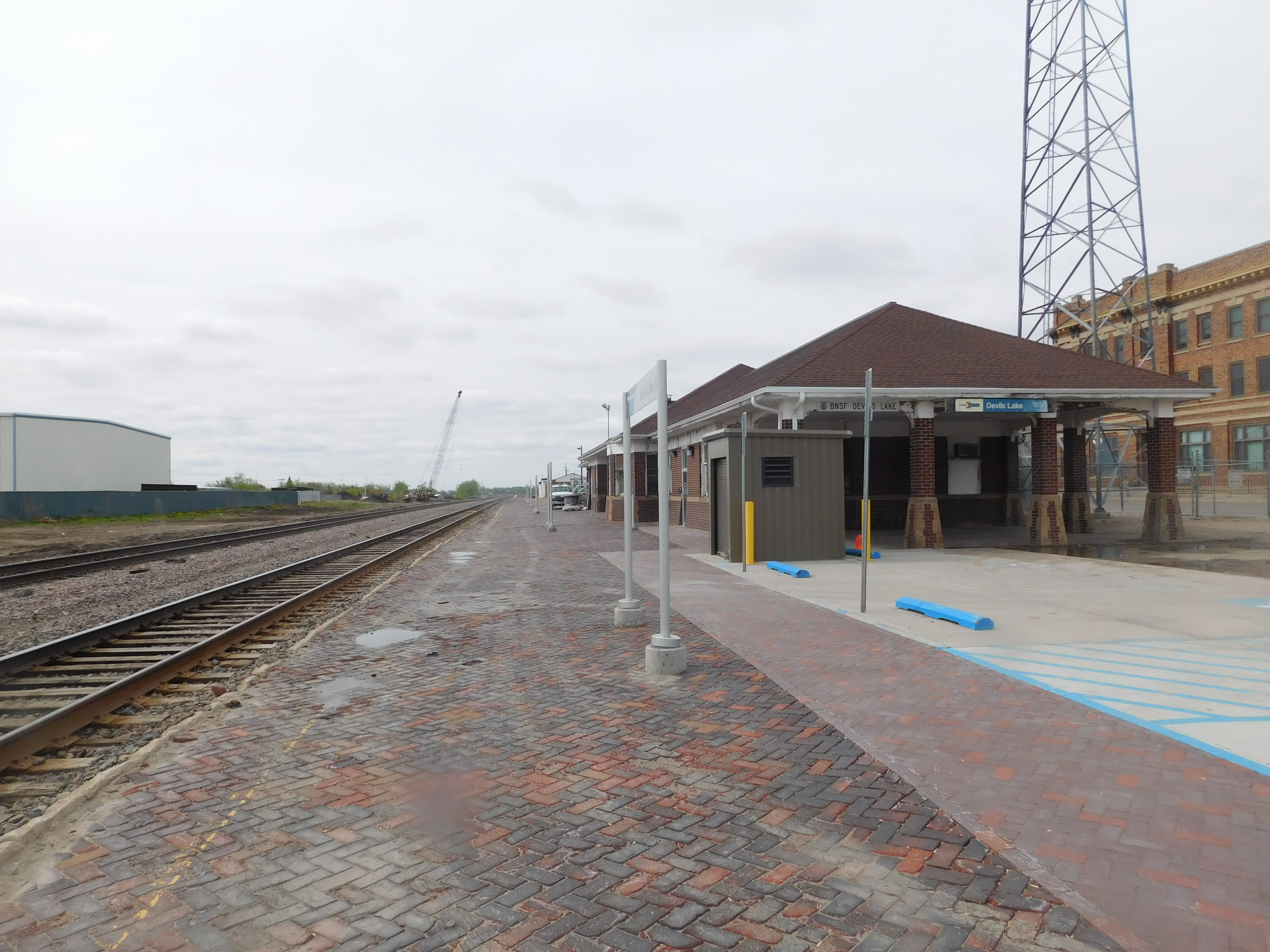
- Devils Lake station in May 2017

General information
- Location: Railroad Avenue and Third Street; Devils Lake, North Dakota; United States
- Coordinates: 48.1104°N 98.8615°W
- Line: BNSF Devils Lake Subdivision
- Platforms: 1 side platform
- Tracks: 2

Construction
- Parking: Yes
- Accessible: Yes

Other information
- Station code: Amtrak: DVL

History
- Opened: c. 1885
- Rebuilt: 1907

Passengers
- FY 2025: 3,432 (Amtrak)

Services
Preceding station	Amtrak	Following station
Rugby toward Seattle or Portland	Empire Builder	Grand Forks toward Chicago
Former services
Preceding station	Great Northern Railway	Following station
Grand Harbor toward Seattle	Main Line Via Grand Forks	Keith toward St. Paul
Terminus	Devils Lake – Fargo	Fort Totten toward Fargo

U.S. Historic district – Contributing property
- Official name: Devils Lake Great Northern Railway Passenger Depot
- Designated: October 24, 1993
- Part of: Devils Lake Commercial District
- Reference no.: 89001675
- Architectural style: None Specified
Location

Devils Lake station is an Amtrak train station in Devils Lake, North Dakota. It is served by Amtrak's daily Empire Builder train.

== History ==
The St. Paul, Minneapolis and Manitoba Railway reached Devils Lake in 1885, though the village was not incorporated until 1887. The railroad merged with the St. Paul and Pacific Railroad in 1889 to become the Great Northern Railway (GN). In 1907, the GN spent $50,000 to build a new station at Devils Lake.

The station is a contributing property to the Devils Lake Commercial District, which was added to the National Register of Historic Places in 1989.

In 2025, Amtrak completed a $4.5 million renovation of the station to improve accessibility. The project included a 300-foot-long (91 m) platform with a snowmelt system.
