= Samuel L. Bartlett =

American architect

Samuel L. Bartlett was an American architect who worked in Saint Paul, Minnesota, in the early 1900s. He was appointed to the position of architect with the Great Northern Railway in 1905. Bartlett was tasked to bring to reality the vision of Great Northern President Louis W. Hill for great destination hotels in the newly created Glacier National Park (U.S.). Several of the lodges and stations Bartlett designed for the Great Northern are listed in the National Register of Historic Places.

- Great Northern Depot, Minot, North Dakota, 1905
- Great Northern Passenger and Freight Depot, 1 Court Street, Aberdeen, North Dakota, 1906, listed on the NRHP in Brown County, South Dakota
- Great Northern Depot, 536 5th Avenue North, Fargo, North Dakota, 1906, Richardsonian Romanesque style
- Great Northern Depot, 402 East Lake Street, Wayzata, Minnesota, 1906, Tudor Revival style, NRHP-listed
- Great Northern Depot, 201 West Dewey Street, Rugby, North Dakota, 1907, NRHP-listed
- Great Northern Jackson Street Engine House, Jackson Street and Pennsylvania Avenue, Saint Paul, Minnesota, 1907, now part of the Minnesota Transportation Museum
- Great Northern Depot, Williston, North Dakota, 1910
- Great Northern Depot, R Avenue and 7th Street, Anacortes, Washington, 1911, listed on the NRHP in Skagit County, Washington
- Great Northern Passenger and Freight Depot, Fairview, Montana, 1913
- Great Northern Depot, 100-110 Neill Avenue, Helena, Montana, 1913 (demolished)
- Glacier Park Lodge, Glacier Park, Montana, 1913, National Park Service rustic style, NRHP-listed
- Granite Park Chalet, Glacier Park, Montana, 1914, NRHP-listed
- Two Medicine Store, Glacier Park, Montana, 1914, NRHP-listed
- Hope Glen Farm, Cottage Grove, Minnesota

== Gallery ==
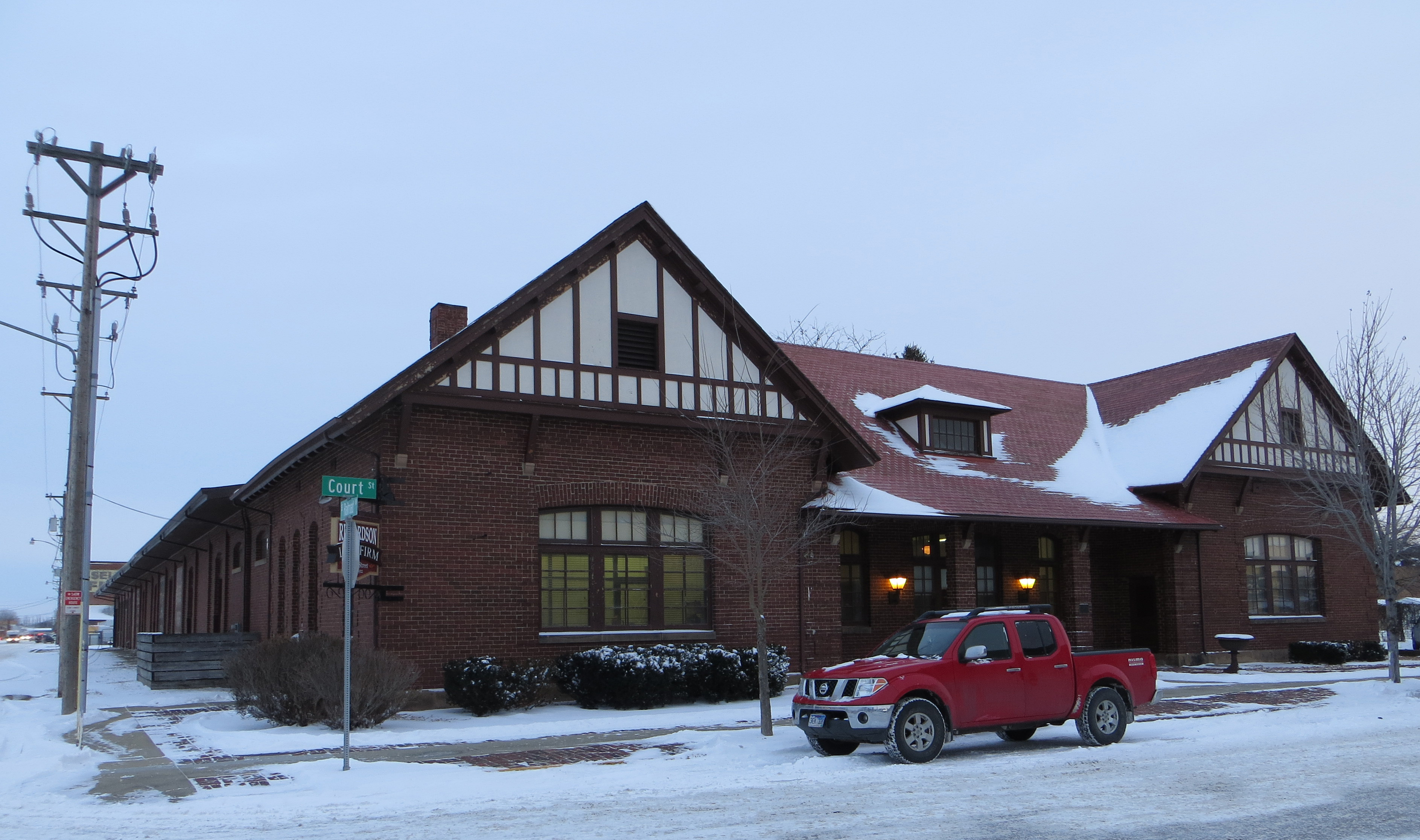
Great Northern Depot, Aberdeen, South Dakota

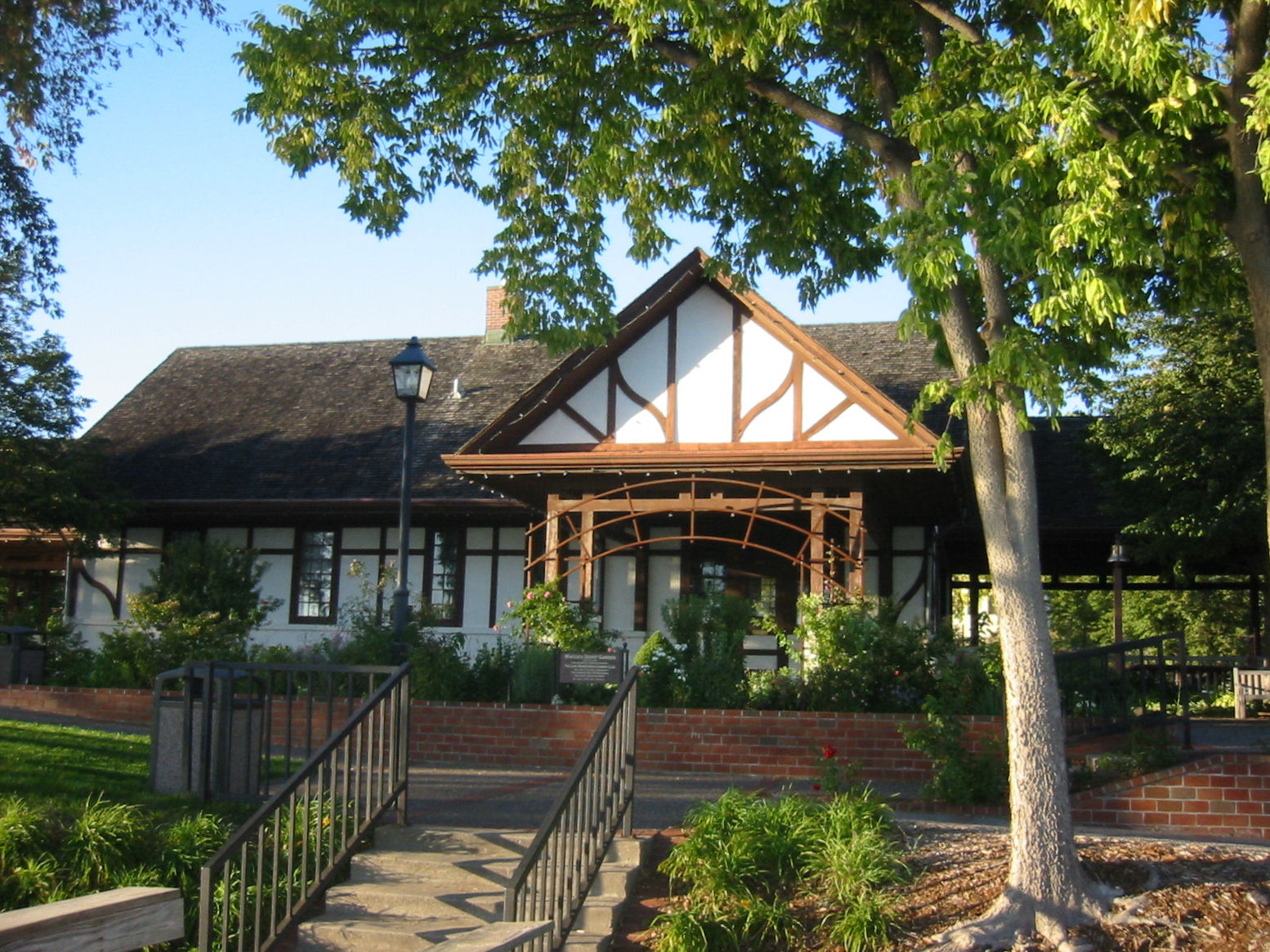
Great Northern Depot, Wayzata, Minnesota

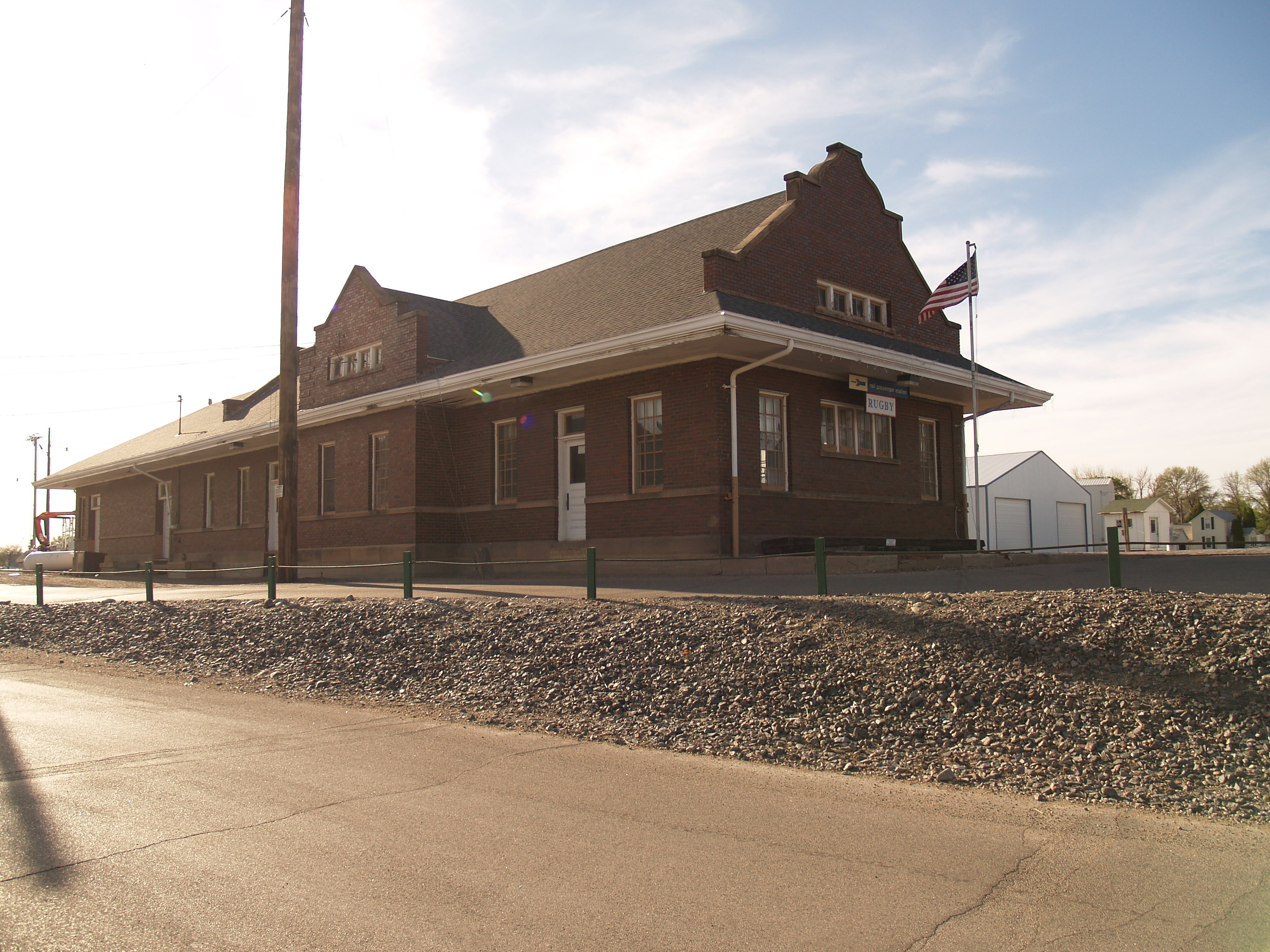
Great Northern Depot, Rugby, North Dakota

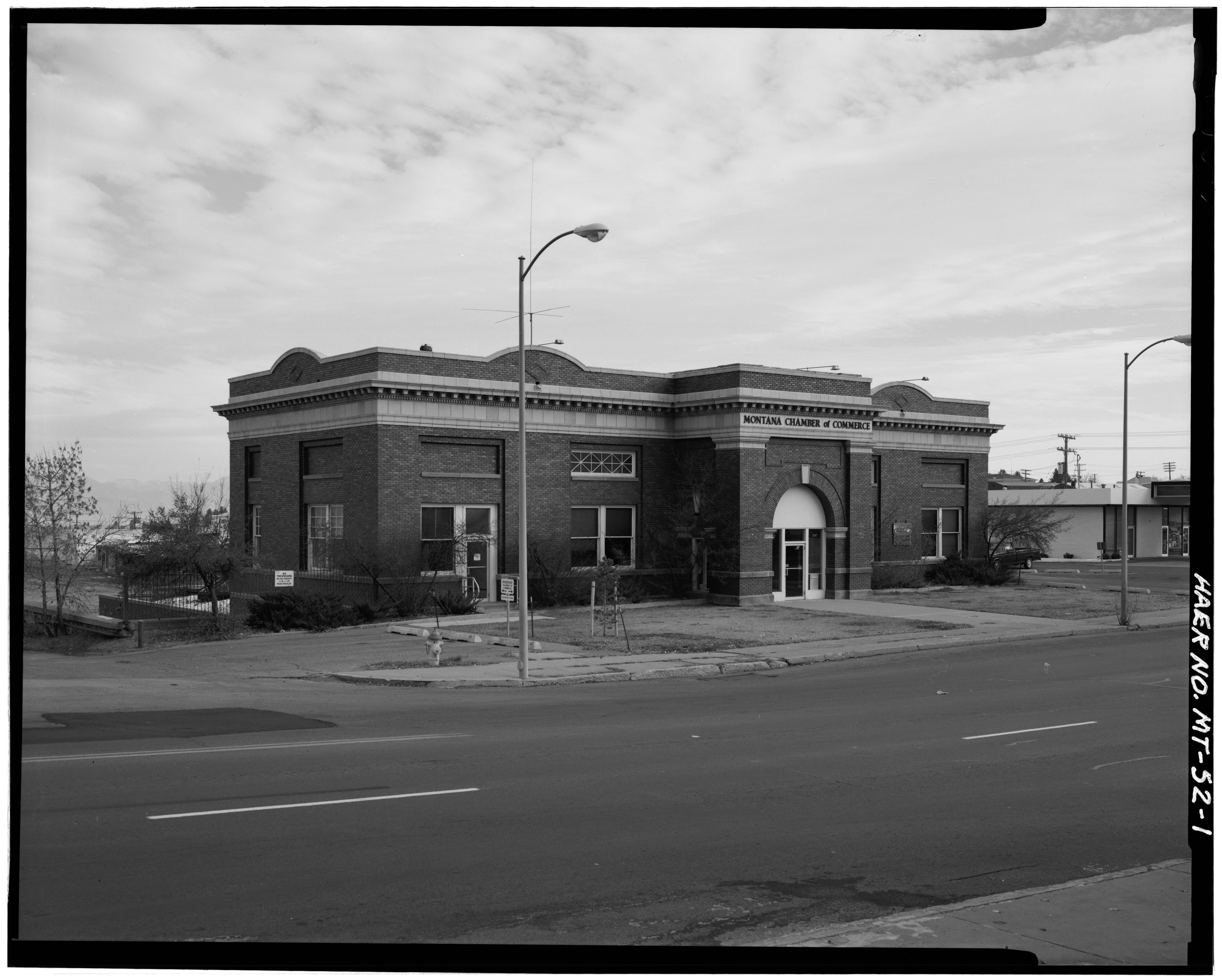
Great Northern Depot, Helena, Montana

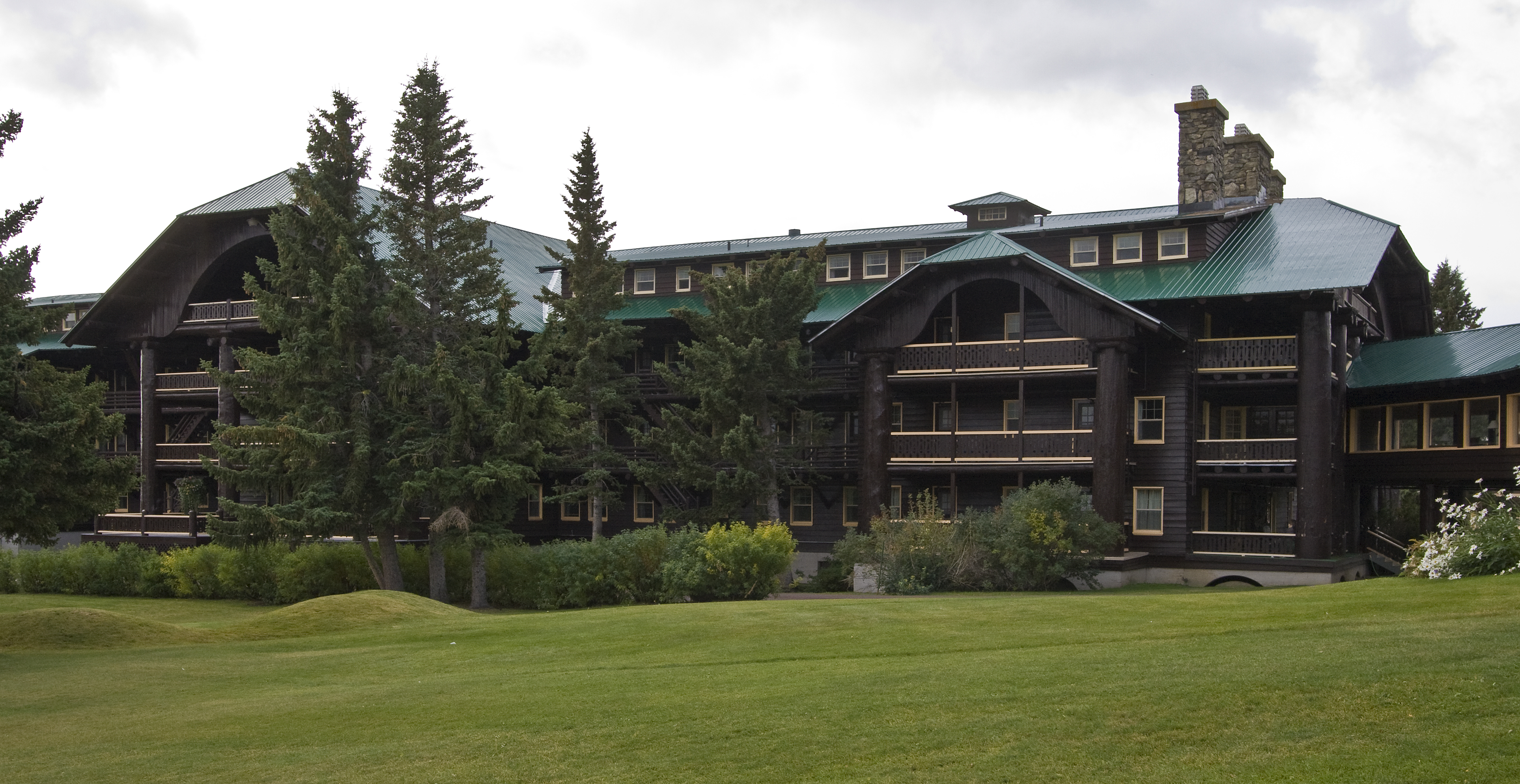
Glacier Park Lodge, East Glacier, Montana

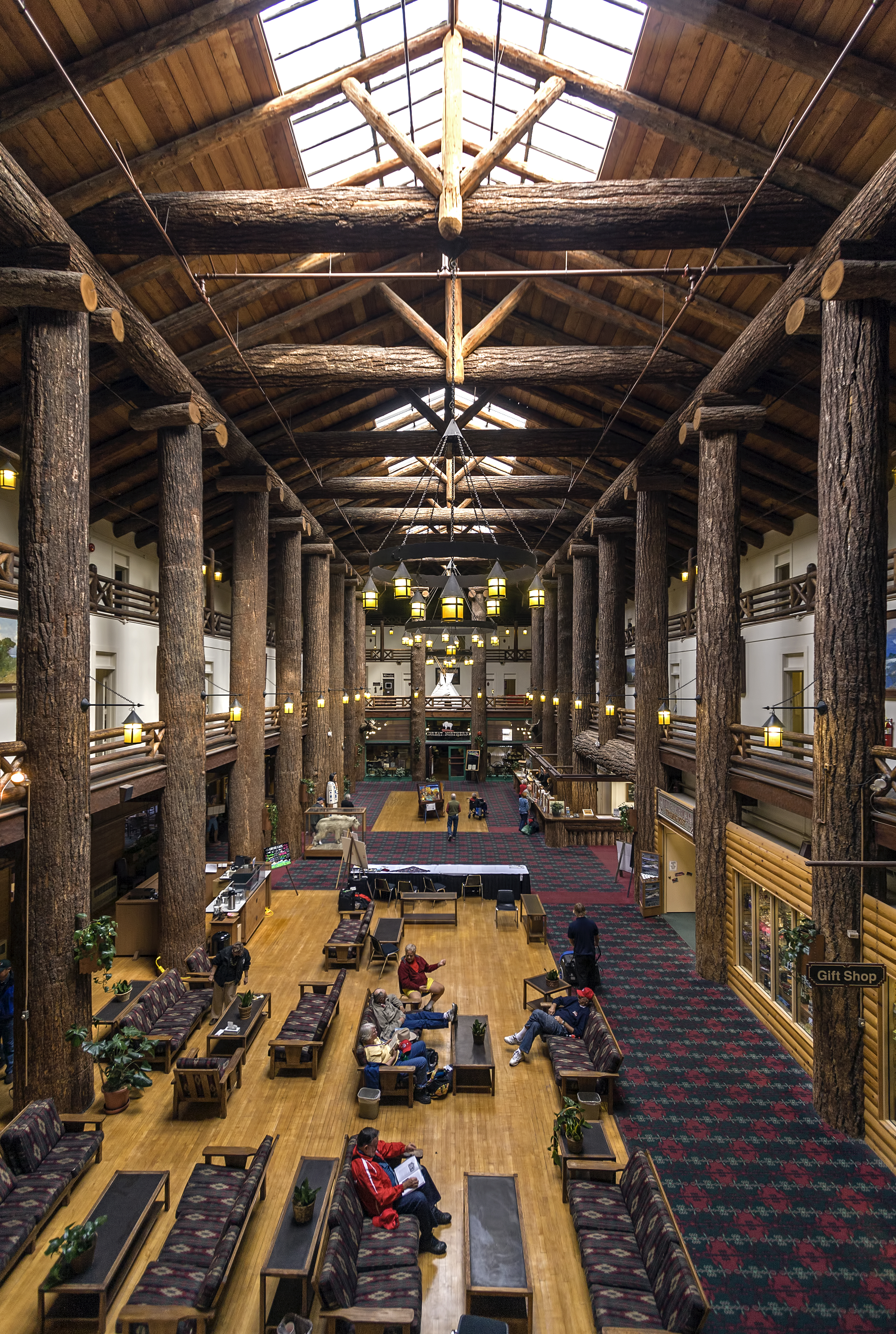
Interior of Glacier Park Lodge, East Glacier, Montana

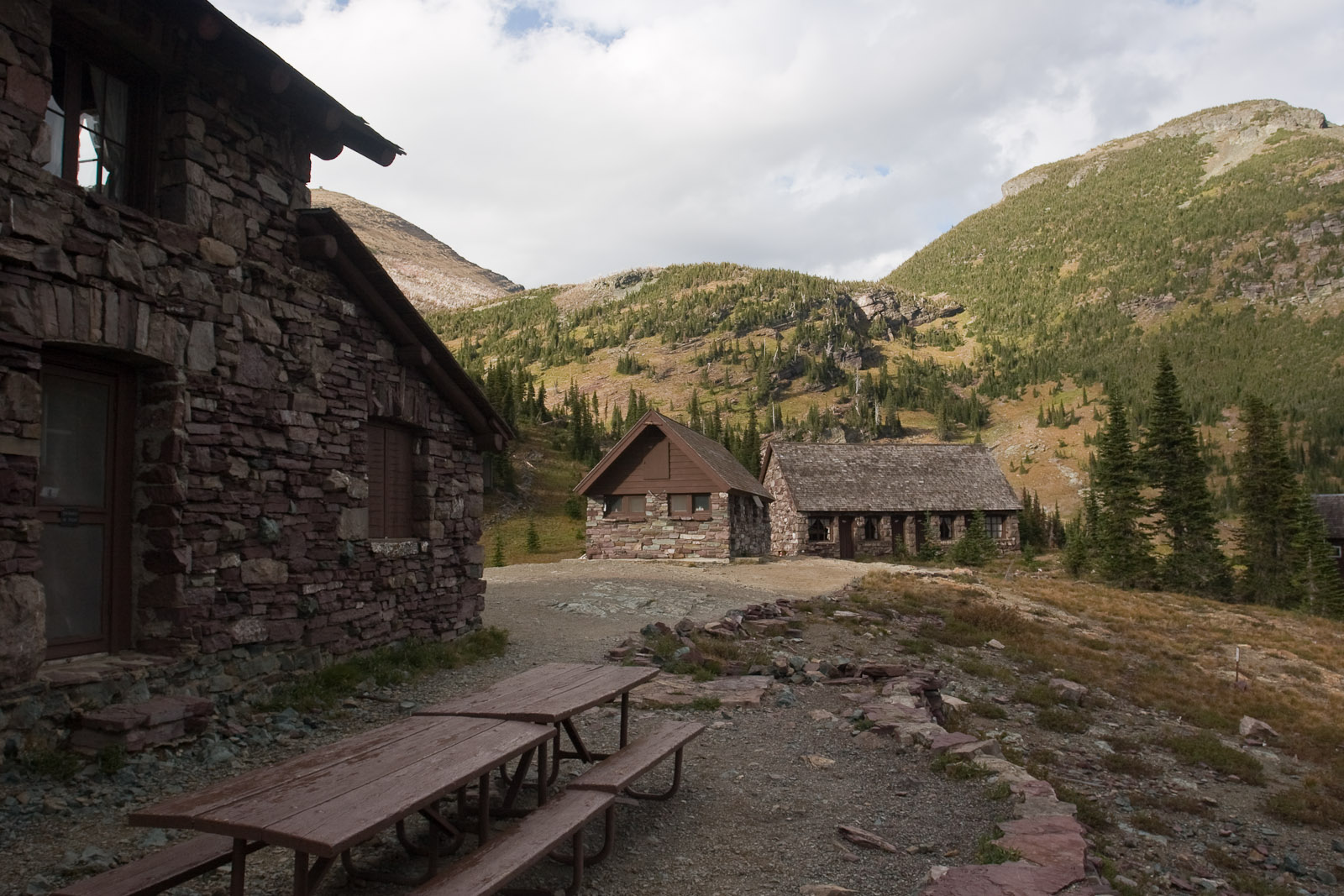
Granite Park Chalet, Glacier National Park, Montana

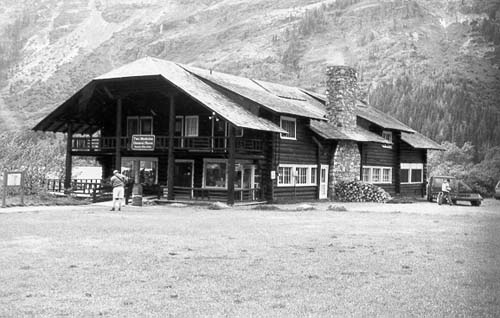
Two Medicine Store, Glacier National Park, Montana
