= Wilkin County Museum =

Museum in Breckenridge, Minnesota

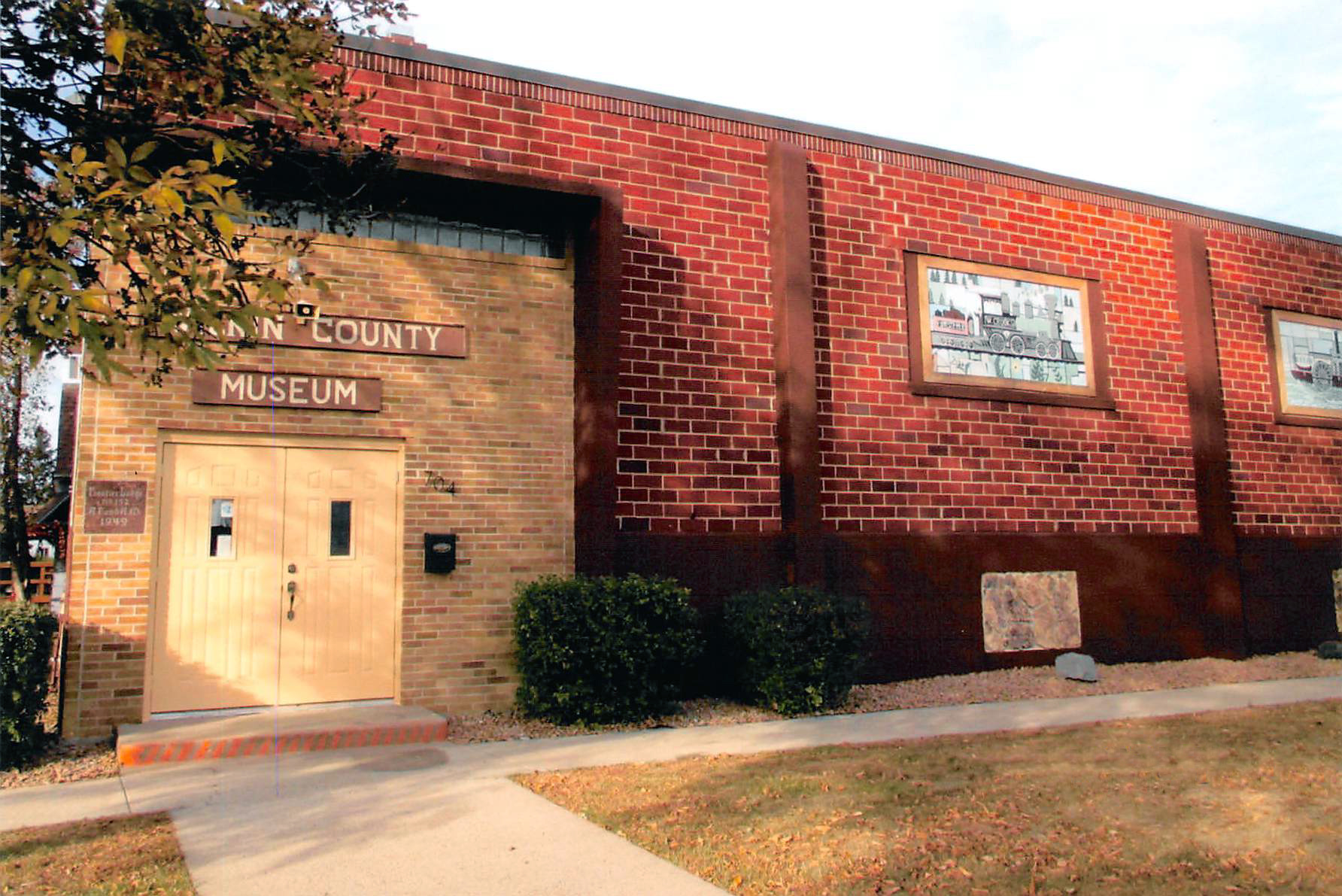
- Exterior of building
- Established: 1979
- Location: 704 Nebraska Avenue, Breckenridge, Minnesota, United States
- Coordinates: 46°15′53″N 96°35′05″W
- Type: Local History

The Wilkin County Museum in Breckenridge, Minnesota, is a local history museum focusing on the history of Wilkin County. The museum is also the home of the Wilkin County Historical Society.

== History ==
The Wilkin County Historical Society organized on March 29, 1965, in order to create a museum. In the beginning with no central place to store items, the museums artifacts were spread to different places around town until the First Federal Savings and Loan in Breckenridge offered their basement to centralize storage of the collection until a building for a museum could be found.

In 1976 they moved to the law enforcement center. A year later, they purchased the former Masonic Temple building in Breckenridge for $1 and began moving their artifacts into the building that was built in 1949. A grand opening of the museum held May 20, 1979. In their first year of operation, the Society moved a schoolhouse in Brushvale, Minnesota, to Welles Memorial Park in Breckenridge for use as another museum. The new schoolhouse location saw 1,000 visitors in its first year. The museum is primarily funded through the county's tax levy, along with memberships and donations.

== Collection ==
The museum has eight rooms furnished as period rooms, including a living room, hospital room, small chapel, and a replica of an old bank teller station. On the lower level is a bedroom, bathroom, pioneer kitchen and laundry room, in addition to many pieces of small farm equipment and farm machines, plus countless other smaller exhibit items. The museum also has a bridal display and a large display of military memorabilia.

== See also ==
- List of museums in Minnesota
