= Breckenridge station =

Former train station in Minnesota

Breckenridge, MN
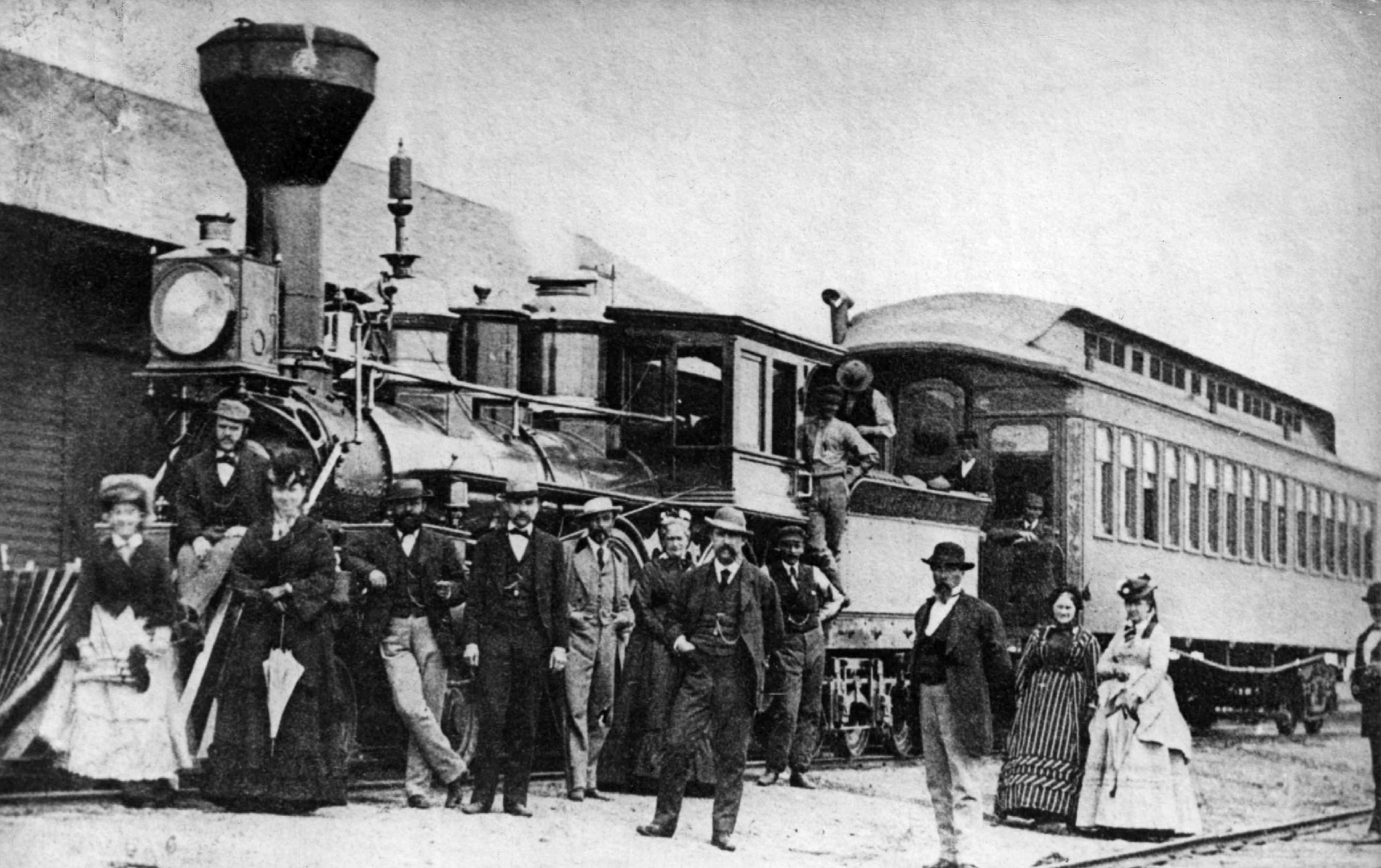
- The previous Breckenridge station, in 1871

General information
- Location: 317 Minnesota Avenue, Breckenridge, Minnesota 56520
- Coordinates: 46.262895°N 96.589430°W
- System: Inter-city rail station
- Line: BNSF Morris Subdivision

History
- Opened: 1901
- Closed: October 1, 1979

Former services
Preceding station	Amtrak	Following station
Fargo toward Seattle or Portland	Empire Builder	Morris toward Chicago
Preceding station	Great Northern Railway	Following station
Wahpeton toward Seattle	Main Line	Doran toward St. Paul
Location

The Breckenridge station of Breckenridge, Minnesota was built in 1901, serving the Great Northern Railway and successor Burlington Northern until 1971. Thereafter, passenger service continued under Amtrak, but with only a single route through Breckenridge, the Empire Builder. After the North Coast Hiawatha, which ran on the former Northern Pacific Railway line from Minneapolis to Fargo, ended service in 1979, the Empire Builder moved to that corridor.
