= Breckenridge, Minnesota =

City in Minnesota, United States

- City
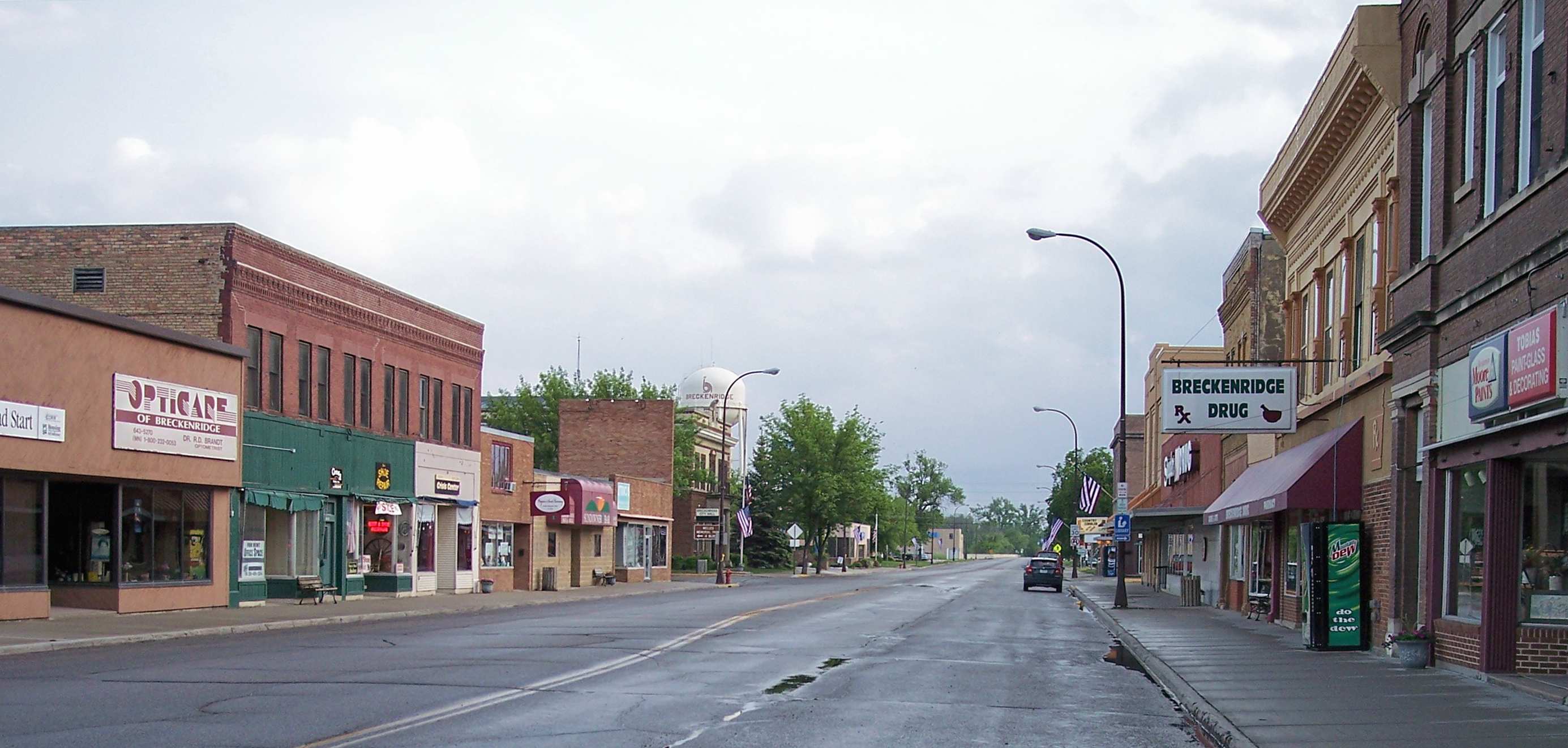
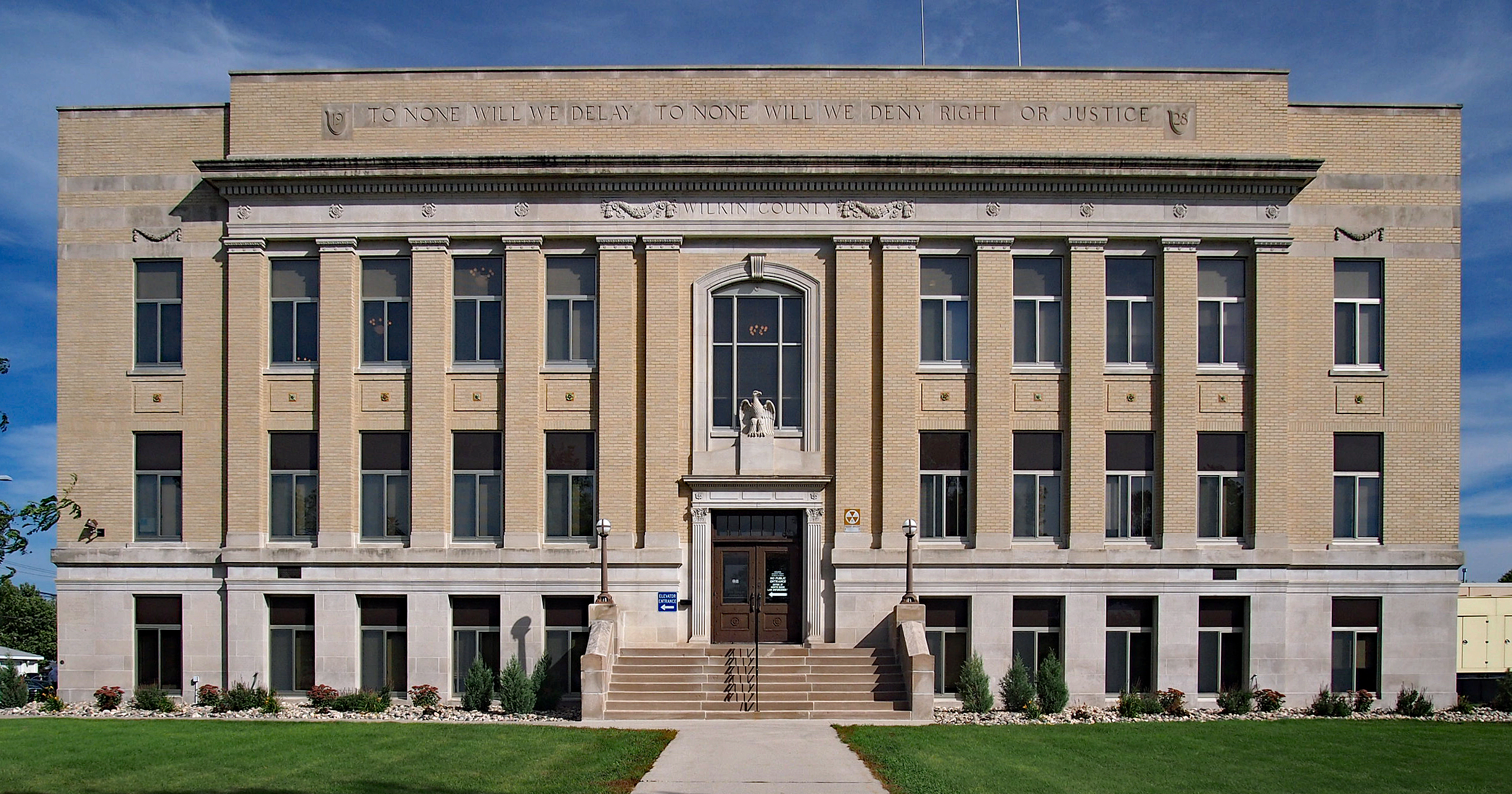
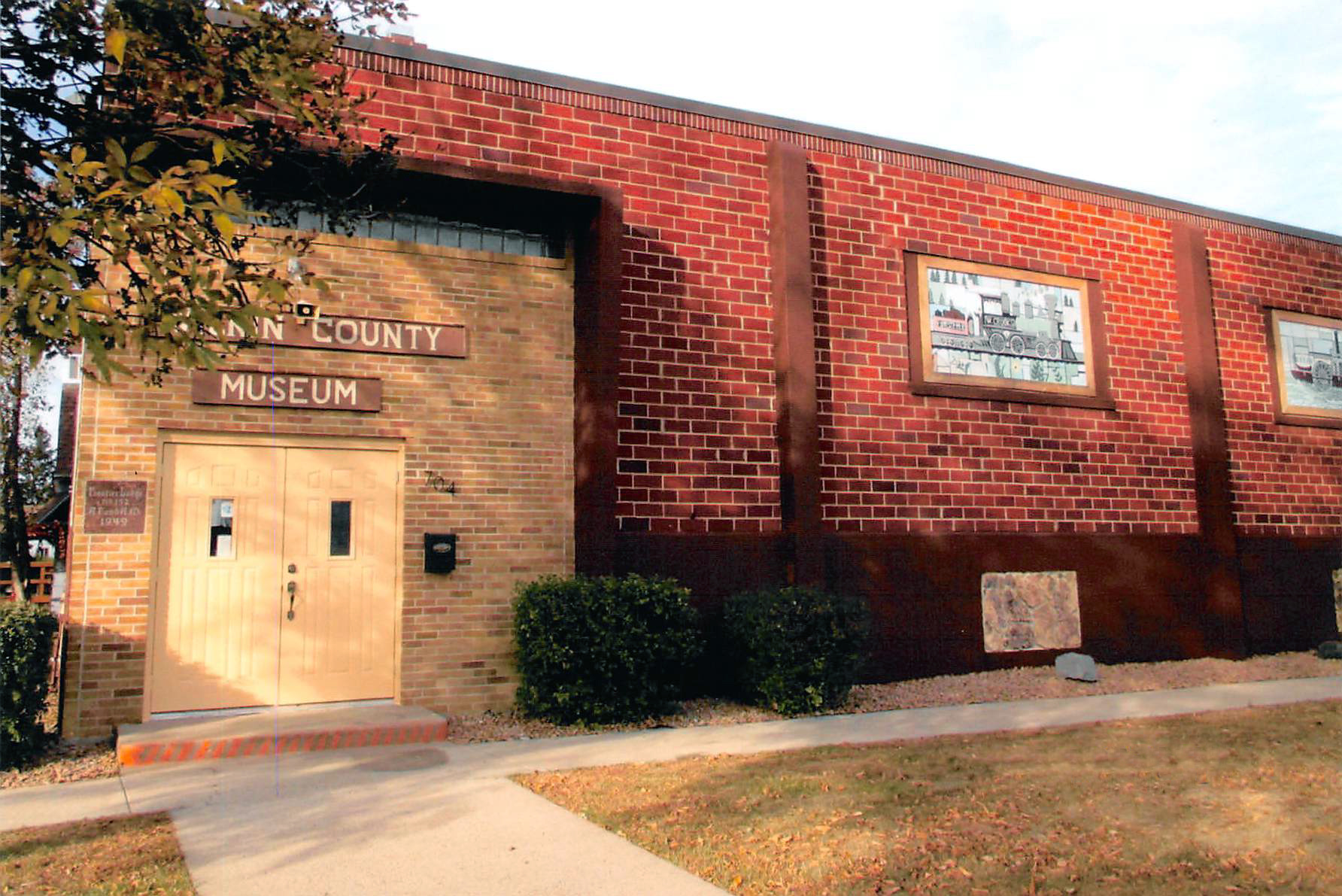
- 5th Street (U.S. Route 75) in downtown Breckenridge in 2007 Wilkin County Courthouse Wilkin County Museum
- Interactive map of Breckenridge, Minnesota
- Location within Minnesota Location within the United States
- Coordinates: 46°15′58.37″N 96°35′5.96″W
- Country: United States
- State: Minnesota
- County: Wilkin
- Platted: 1857
- Incorporated: 1908
- Named for: John Cabell Breckinridge

Government
  - Mayor: Russ Wilson
  - City manager: Sydney Wiertzema
  - Councilmembers: Beth Meyer; Evie Fox; Reed Johnson; James Jawaski; Chris Vedder; Scott Wermerskirchen

Area
  - City: 2.596 sq mi (6.724 km^{2})
  - Land: 2.596 sq mi (6.724 km^{2})
  - Water: 0 sq mi (0.000 km^{2})
- Elevation: 961 ft (293 m)

Population (2020)
  - City: 3,430
  - Estimate (2023): 3,331
  - Density: 1,283/sq mi (495.4/km^{2})
  - Urban: 11,290
  - Metro: 22,864 (US: 490th)
- Time zone: UTC–6 (Central (CST))
  - Summer (DST): UTC–5 (CDT)
- ZIP Code: 56520
- Area code: 218
- FIPS code: 27-07462
- GNIS feature ID: 2393405
- Highways: MN 9, US 75, MN 210
- Sales tax: 6.875%
- Website: breckenridgemn.net

Breckenridge is a city in and the county seat of Wilkin County, Minnesota, United States. The population was 3,430 at the 2020 census.

Breckenridge's twin city is Wahpeton, North Dakota. It is part of the Wahpeton, ND—MN Micropolitan Statistical Area. The Bois de Sioux River and the Otter Tail River join at Breckenridge and Wahpeton to form the Red River of the North.

== History ==
Breckenridge was platted in 1857, and named for John Cabell Breckinridge, a U.S. senator from Kentucky and the 14th Vice President of the United States. Breckenridge was also staunchly pro-slavery and was a Major General in the Confederate Army. A post office has been in operation at Breckenridge since 1857. Breckenridge was incorporated in 1908. The city contains one property listed on the National Register of Historic Places, the 1928 Wilkin County Courthouse.

== Geography ==
According to the United States Census Bureau, the city has a total area of 2.596 square miles (6.72 km^{2}), all land.

U.S. Route 75 and Minnesota State Highways 9 and 210 are three of the main routes in the city. Additionally, the city was situated on the Twin Cities to Seattle main line of the Great Northern Railway. As a result, the Breckenridge station was served by numerous passenger trains through the years until 1979. The city continues to see freight rail traffic on the now BNSF line.

== Demographics ==
Historical population
Census	Pop.	Note	%±
1890	655		—
1900	1,282		95.7%
1910	1,840		43.5%
1920	2,401		30.5%
1930	2,261		−5.8%
1940	2,745		21.4%
1950	3,623		32.0%
1960	4,335		19.7%
1970	4,200		−3.1%
1980	3,909		−6.9%
1990	3,708		−5.1%
2000	3,559		−4.0%
2010	3,386		−4.9%
2020	3,430		1.3%
2023 (est.)	3,331		−2.9%
U.S. Decennial Census; 2020 Census

=== Racial and ethnic composition ===
Breckenridge, Minnesota – racial and ethnic composition Note: the US Census treats Hispanic/Latino as an ethnic category. This table excludes Latinos from the racial categories and assigns them to a separate category. Hispanics/Latinos may be of any race.
Race / ethnicity (NH = non-Hispanic)	Pop. 2000	Pop. 2010	Pop. 2020	% 2000	% 2010	% 2020
White alone (NH)	3,427	3,196	3,037	96.29%	94.39%	88.54%
Black or African American alone (NH)	5	6	30	0.14%	0.18%	0.87%
Native American or Alaska Native alone (NH)	20	43	64	0.56%	1.27%	1.87%
Asian alone (NH)	6	14	8	0.17%	0.41%	0.23%
Pacific Islander alone (NH)	1	0	1	0.03%	0.00%	0.03%
Other race alone (NH)	0	0	4	0.00%	0.00%	0.12%
Mixed race or multiracial (NH)	39	41	150	1.10%	1.21%	4.37%
Hispanic or Latino (any race)	61	86	136	1.71%	2.54%	3.97%
Total	3,559	3,386	3,430	100.00%	100.00%	100.00%

=== 2020 census ===
As of the 2020 census, there were 3,430 people, 1,551 households, and 860 families residing in the city. The median age was 42.6 years. 22.7% of residents were under the age of 18, 3.1% were under 5 years of age, and 20.9% were 65 years of age or older. For every 100 females there were 100.5 males, and for every 100 females age 18 and over there were 96.5 males.

The population density was 1,356.3 inhabitants per square mile (523.7/km^{2}). There were 1,658 housing units at an average density of 655.6 inhabitants per square mile (253.1/km^{2}). Of the housing units, 6.5% were vacant. The homeowner vacancy rate was 1.1% and the rental vacancy rate was 9.1%.

98.5% of residents lived in urban areas, while 1.5% lived in rural areas.

Of the 1,551 households, 24.6% had children under the age of 18 living in them. 40.2% were married-couple households, 23.2% were households with a male householder and no spouse or partner present, and 29.2% were households with a female householder and no spouse or partner present. About 39.0% of all households were made up of individuals, and 18.9% had someone living alone who was 65 years of age or older.

=== Demographic estimates ===
As of the 2022 American Community Survey, there are 1,441 estimated households in Breckenridge with an average of 2.3 persons per household. The city has a median household income of $57,094. Approximately 20.7% of the city's population lives at or below the poverty line. Breckenridge has an estimated 64.8% employment rate, with 26.2% of the population holding a bachelor's degree or higher and 91.7% holding a high school diploma.

The top nine reported ancestries (people were allowed to report up to two ancestries, thus the figures will generally add to more than 100%) were German (43.1%), Norwegian (23.0%), Polish (7.2%), Irish (6.5%), English (5.8%), French (except Basque) (1.9%), Italian (0.3%), Scottish (0.0%), and Subsaharan African (0.0%).

The median age in the city was 41.3 years.

=== 2010 census ===
As of the 2010 census, there were 3,386 people, 1,445 households, and 861 families living in the city. The population density was 1,376.4 inhabitants per square mile (531.4/km^{2}). There were 1,635 housing units at an average density of 664.6 per square mile (256.6/km^{2}). The racial makeup of the city was 96.28% White, 0.21% African American, 1.39% Native American, 0.41% Asian, 0.32% from other races, and 1.39% from two or more races. Hispanic or Latino people of any race were 2.54% of the population.

There were 1,445 households, of which 27.4% had children under the age of 18 living with them, 47.5% were married couples living together, 7.8% had a female householder with no husband present, 4.3% had a male householder with no wife present, and 40.4% were non-families. 36.2% of all households were made up of individuals, and 15.5% had someone living alone who was 65 years of age or older. The average household size was 2.24 and the average family size was 2.91.

The median age in the city was 43.3 years. The demographic breakdown of the city is as follows: 23.3% of residents were under the age of 18; 7.4% were between the ages of 18 and 24; 21.2% were from 25 to 44; 26.8% were from 45 to 64; and 21.2% were 65 years of age or older. The gender makeup of the city was 49.0% male and 51.0% female.

=== 2000 census ===
As of the 2000 census, there were 3,559 people, 1,438 households, and 911 families living in the city. The population density was 1,516.4 inhabitants per square mile (585.5/km^{2}). There were 1,582 housing units at an average density of 674.0 inhabitants per square mile (260.2/km^{2}). The racial makeup of the city was 97.61% White, 0.14% African American, 0.56% Native American, 0.17% Asian, 0.03% Pacific Islander, 0.39% from other races, and 1.10% from two or more races. Hispanic or Latino people of any race were 1.71% of the population.

There were 1,438 households, out of which 33.4% had children under the age of 18 living with them, 51.8% were married couples living together, 9.2% had a female householder with no husband present, and 36.6% were non-families. 31.7% of all households were made up of individuals, and 16.6% had someone living alone who was 65 years of age or older. The average household size was 2.38 and the average family size was 3.05.

In the city, the population was spread out, with 26.6% under the age of 18, 7.9% from 18 to 24, 27.1% from 25 to 44, 19.8% from 45 to 64, and 18.7% who were 65 years of age or older. The median age was 38 years. For every 100 females, there were 87.5 males. For every 100 females age 18 and over, there were 86.2 males.

The median income for a household in the city was $37,054, and the median income for a family was $47,500. Males had a median income of $31,869 versus $21,328 for females. The per capita income for the city was $17,059. About 7.3% of families and 9.0% of the population were below the poverty line, including 9.5% of those under age 18 and 11.5% of those age 65 or over.

== Notable people ==
- Dick Enderle, professional football player
- Heidi Heitkamp, former US Senator from North Dakota
- Chuck Klosterman, writer and novelist
- Errol Mann, professional football player, member of the Oakland Raiders Super Bowl XI team
- Reuben N. Nelson, lawyer and politician
- George Putnam, radio newsman
- Fritz Scholder, Native American artist
- Gerry Sikorski, politician
- Cheryl Tiegs, professional model
- Adrian P. Winkel, High Commissioner of the Trust Territory of the Pacific Islands
- Cody Mauch, professional football player
