= Wayzata station =

Historic railway station in Minnesota, U.S.

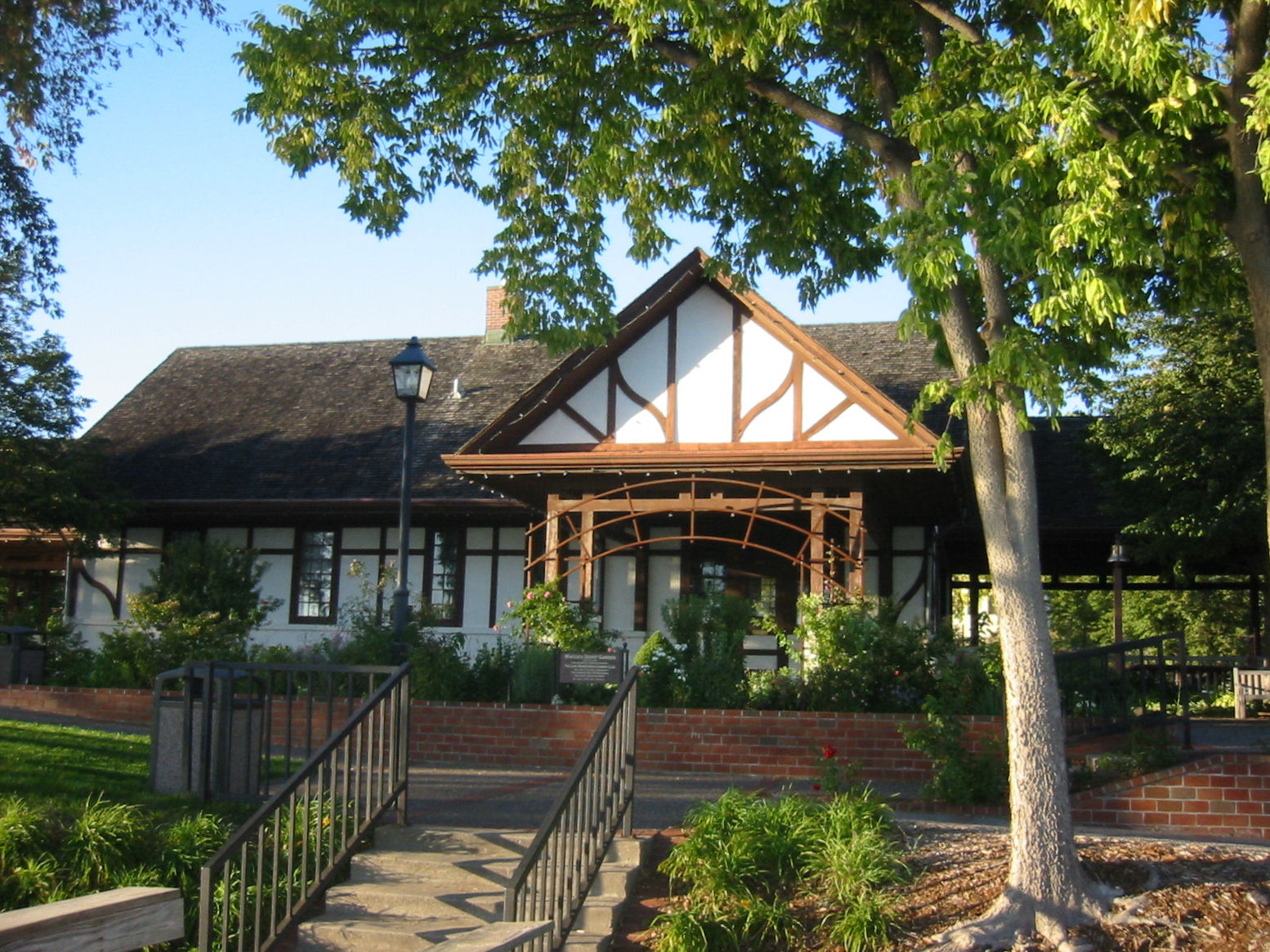
- The Wayzata Depot as seen from the docks on Lake Minnetonka

General information
- Location: 402 East Lake Street; Wayzata, Minnesota 55391
- Coordinates: 44°58′11.2182″N 93°30′58.536″W

Former services
Preceding station	Great Northern Railway	Following station
Delano toward Seattle	Main Line	Minneapolis toward St. Paul
Crystal Bay toward Hutchinson	Hutchinson – Minneapolis	Hopkins toward Minneapolis
- Great Northern Railway Depot
- U.S. National Register of Historic Places
- Location within Minnesota Location within the United States
- Built: 1906
- Architect: Samuel L. Bartlett
- Engineer: A.H. Hogeland
- Architectural style: English Tudor Revival
- NRHP reference No.: 81000322
- Added to NRHP: July 7, 1981
Location

Wayzata station (officially recognized as the Great Northern Railway Depot but commonly referred to as the Wayzata Depot) is a historic train depot in Wayzata, Minnesota, United States. Constructed and operated by the Great Northern Railway, the station was in service from 1906 until 1971. The depot is positioned along Lake Minnetonka in downtown Wayzata with steps leading down to the lakeshore. Although no longer transporting passenger trains, the BNSF Railway line going through Wayzata is still active today.

Designed in the English Tudor Revival style by architect Samuel L. Bartlett, the depot was listed in the National Register of Historic Places in 1981. Donated to the city in 1972 by the Burlington Northern Railway, it is currently home to both the Wayzata Historical Society Museum and the Wayzata Area Chamber of Commerce.

== History ==
The Saint Paul and Pacific Railroad, predecessor of the Great Northern, reached Wayzata on August 24, 1867. The first depot was located at the foot of Broadway Avenue, about three blocks east of the present depot location. At that time the tracks were laid on top of Lake Street, the town's main road. When the railroad was extended westward through the town, local citizens protested because trains would shower the business district with cinders and sparks. The railroad ignored their complaints, but nevertheless influenced the town's economy and identity as it connected local farmers to large, urban markets and made Wayzata a transportation center for Lake Minnetonka's burgeoning tourism industry.

During the Panic of 1873, the Saint Paul and Pacific struggled financially. In 1879 it was purchased by James J. Hill and other investors and reorganized as the Saint Paul, Minneapolis, and Manitoba Railway (StPM&M). Four years later, the community of Wayzata incorporated as a village. The first act of the Village Council was to ban saloons, and the second was to have the railroad tracks moved away from the downtown business district. An 1883 ordinance required the tracks to be relocated 300 feet (91 m) to the north. Hill, chairman of the StPM&M, ignored the village's ordinance.

The Village Council ultimately filed a lawsuit against the railroad in 1889. Hill argued that he had state law on his side and that, if the town continued its lawsuit, he would move the station nearly a mile east of town. In 1891, the Minnesota Supreme Court ruled against the Great Northern, holding that the company was trespassing on village property (Lake Street) with its tracks through the downtown area. As promised, Hill tore down the existing station and moved it to flat land beneath today's Bushaway Road railroad bridge. When the new station received the name Holdridge, Wayzata was literally taken off the map.

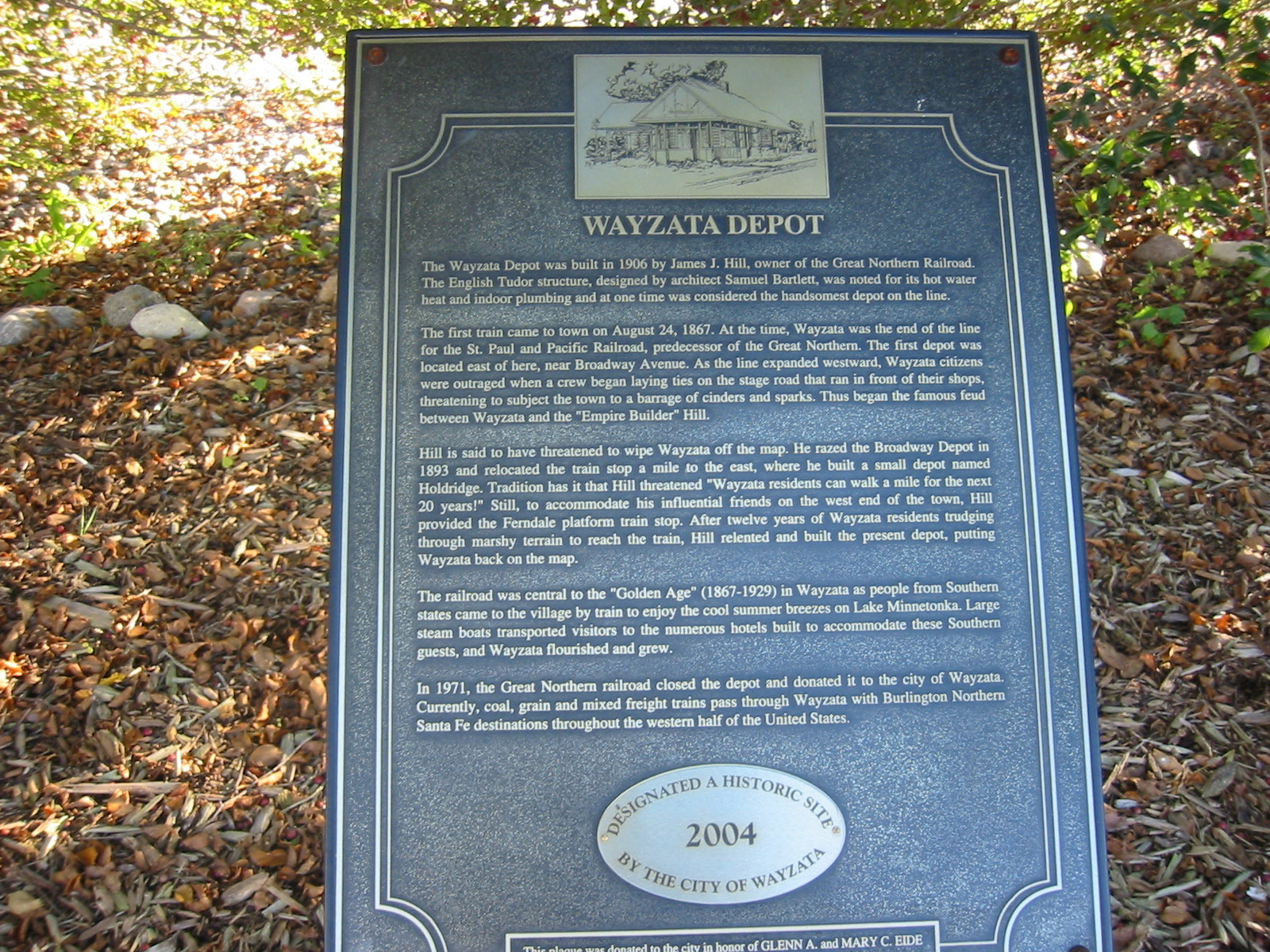
A plaque describing the history of the depot

By 1905 the Village Council had had enough and voted for a reconciliation ordinance with the railroad, which had been part of Hill's Great Northern Railway since 1890. Hill responded by commissioning the construction of a new depot near Wayzata's downtown business district on the shores of Lake Minnetonka. When it was completed in 1906, the new building was considered the "handsomest" on the entire Great Northern line.

Trains serviced the depot with scheduled stops until 1958, when it became a "flag stop" serviced by request only. The Great Northern Railway merged with other railroads to form the Burlington Northern Railroad in 1970, only a short time before Amtrak took over US passenger rail service in 1971. When this happened, all passenger service to and from Wayzata was terminated. With no further commercial use in sight, Burlington Northern donated the depot to the city of Wayzata in 1972. The building was later rehabilitated and added to the National Register of Historic Places in 1981.

Today the depot is shared between the Wayzata Area Chamber of Commerce and the Wayzata Historical Society, which operates a museum inside the former waiting room. The museum was opened in 2001. In the summer, the Museum of Lake Minnetonka operates the historic Minnehaha steamboat from a dock located adjacent to the depot.

== Architecture ==
The Wayzata Depot was designed by Great Northern architect Samuel L. Bartlett in the English Tudor Revival style of architecture. The structure features a stucco facade and three gabled porticoes with curved half-timbering. Original lead glass windows remain in place.

Inside, the depot's waiting room features porcelain tile walls and a terrazzo floor. Original waiting room benches, a freight agent's desk, and freight scales reproduce the experience of checking passengers' luggage on the train. Features such as indoor plumbing and a water fountain, modern by non-urban 1906 standards, are original to the building.

The office area houses the Depot Agent's desk, the operator's desk, and various memorabilia. A ticket window connects the office with the waiting room. Located behind the office, the baggage room retains its original wood plank ceiling.

== Garden railroad display ==
In September 2006 the Minnesota Garden Railroad Society (MGRS) installed a temporary garden railroad display at the depot to help the city of Wayzata celebrate its annual James J. Hill Days. The positive response to this attraction prompted the City of Wayzata, the Wayzata Historical Society, and the MGRS to hold meetings about building a permanent garden railroad layout there. After the City of Wayzata approved the project in 2009, Minnesota received its first public garden railroad display. The MGRS runs G scale model garden trains on weekends.
