= Aberdeen station (Great Northern Railway) =

Railway station in Aberdeen, South Dakota

Aberdeen
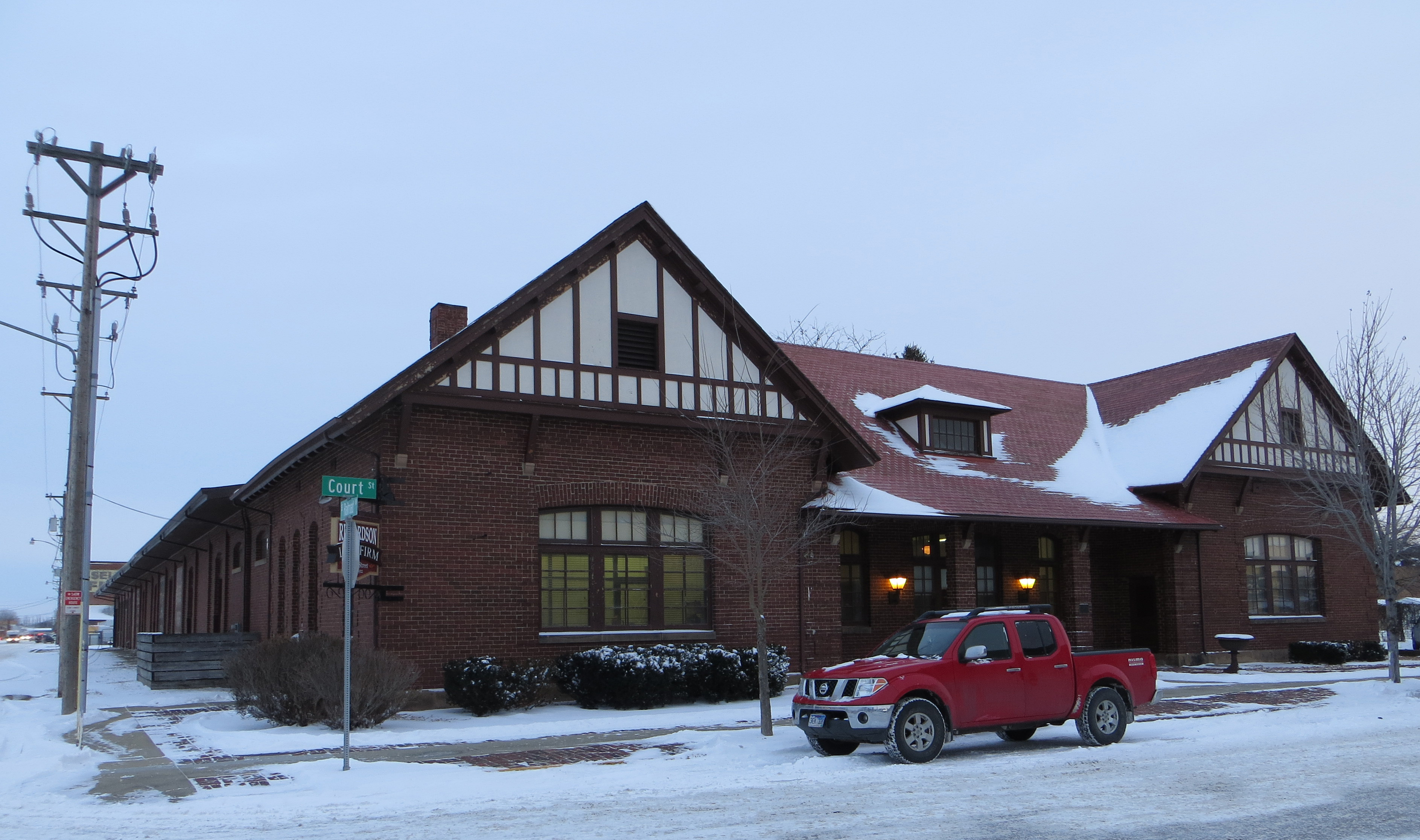

General information
- Location: 1 Court St., Aberdeen, South Dakota
- Coordinates: 45°27′54″N 98°29′7″W
- System: Former Great Northern Railway passenger rail station

History
- Opened: 1906
- Great Northern Railway Passenger and Freight Depot
- U.S. National Register of Historic Places
- Location within South Dakota Location within the United States
- Location: 1 Court St., Aberdeen, South Dakota
- Coordinates: 45°27′54″N 98°29′7″W
- Area: 2 acres (0.81 ha)
- Built: 1906
- Architect: Samuel L. Bartlett
- Architectural style: Late 19th And 20th Century Revivals
- NRHP reference No.: 83003002
- Added to NRHP: January 27, 1983
Location

Aberdeen station, also known as the Burlington Northern Depot, is a historic Burlington Northern train station at 1 Court Street in Aberdeen, South Dakota.

It was built in 1906, designed by architect Samuel L. Bartlett, and was added to the National Register of Historic Places in 1983 as the Great Northern Railway Passenger and Freight Depot.

== See also ==
- Great Northern Railway Passenger and Freight Depot and Division Office
- National Register of Historic Places listings in Brown County, South Dakota
