= Great Northern Freight Warehouse =

- Formerly listed on the U.S. National Register of Historic Places
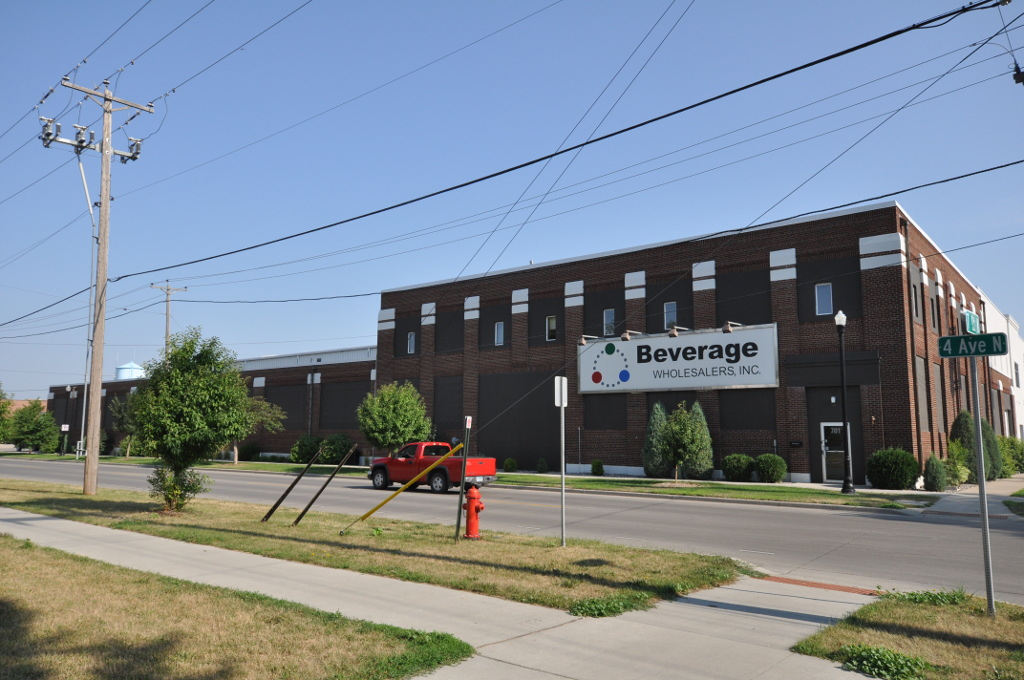

- Location within North Dakota Location within the United States
- Location: 420 N. Seventh St., Fargo, North Dakota
- Coordinates: 46°52′52″N 96°47′28″W
- Area: 1 acre (0.40 ha)
- Built: 1902, 1923, 1927
- Architectural style: Chicago architecture; Commercial Style architecture
- NRHP reference No.: 90001749

Significant dates
- Added to NRHP: November 21, 1990
- Removed from NRHP: Dececmber 31, 2025

Great Northern Freight Warehouse is a red brick warehouse in Fargo, North Dakota that was listed on the National Register of Historic Places in 1990.

It was built in 1902 and later expanded, in Chicago and/or Commercial Style architecture style.

It's significant for its history and for its architecture.

The building is long and narrow, about 40 by 580 feet (12 m × 177 m) in plan. The eastern end is a two-story 40 by 52 feet (12 m × 16 m) section built in 1923, probably replacing an office section of the original 1902 building, which functions as a headhouse.
