= Rugby station (North Dakota) =

Train station in Rugby, North Dakota, US

Rugby, ND
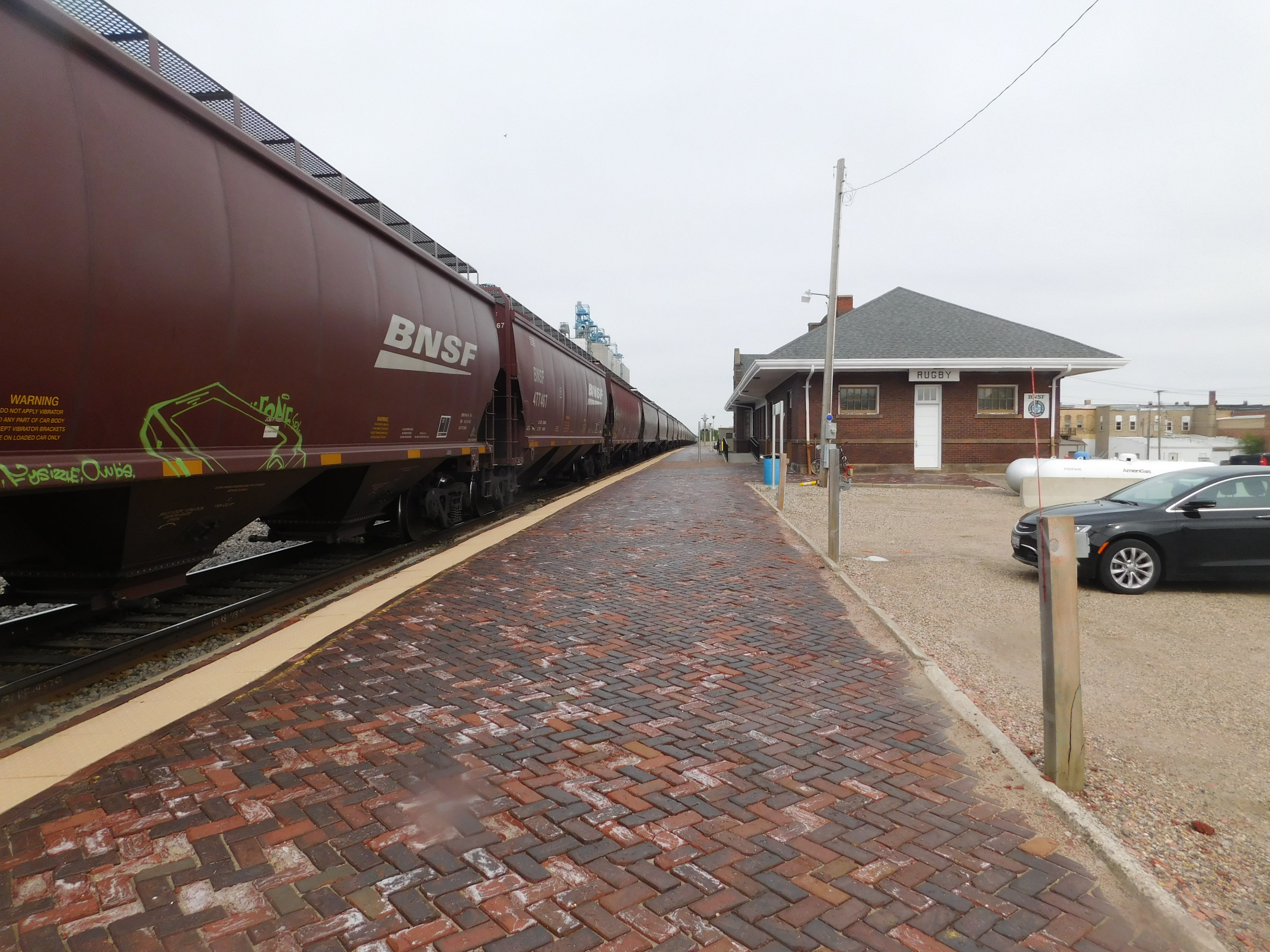
- Rugby station with a BNSF Railway freight train

General information
- Location: 201 West Dewey Street; Rugby, North Dakota; United States
- Coordinates: 48.3697°N 99.9977°W
- Owner: BNSF Railway
- Line: BNSF Devils Lake Subdivision
- Platforms: 1 side platform
- Tracks: 5

Construction
- Parking: Yes; free
- Accessible: Yes

Other information
- Station code: Amtrak: RUG

History
- Rebuilt: 1907

Passengers
- FY 2025: 2,807 (Amtrak)

Services
Preceding station	Amtrak	Following station
Minot toward Seattle or Portland	Empire Builder	Devils Lake toward Chicago
Former services
Preceding station	Great Northern Railway	Following station
Turnbridge toward Seattle	Main Line Via Grand Forks	Pleasant Lake toward St. Paul
Leverich toward Antler	Antler – Rugby	Terminus
- Great Northern Passenger Depot
- U.S. National Register of Historic Places
- Built: 1907
- Architect: Great Northern Railway and Samuel L. Bartlett
- Architectural style: Tudor Revival
- NRHP reference No.: 91001466
- Added to NRHP: September 26, 1991
Location

Rugby station is a train station in Rugby, North Dakota served by Amtrak's Empire Builder line. The station was built in 1907 as the Great Northern Passenger Depot. In 1987 a local Lions Club chapter was among the groups involved in a restoration project for the station. The former Great Northern Depot was placed on the National Register of Historic Places on September 26, 1991.

Rugby is served daily by Amtrak's Empire Builder. The platform, tracks, and station are all owned by BNSF Railway.

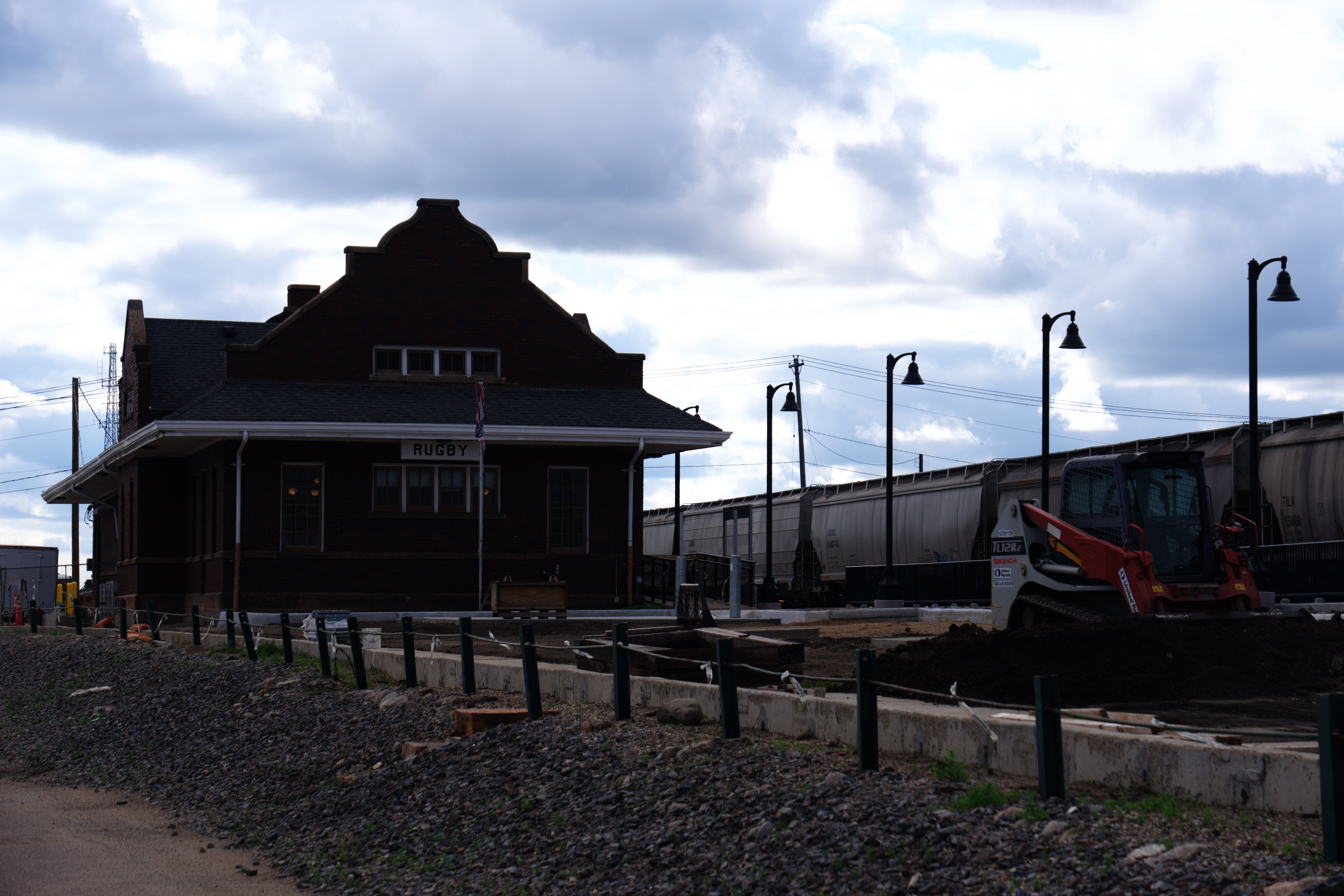
Rugby station under renovation in 2024

In 2025, Amtrak completed a $10.4 million renovation of the station to improve accessibility. The project included a 750-foot (230 m)-long platform with a snowmelt system.
