= National Register of Historic Places listings in North Dakota =

There are 461 properties and historic districts listed on the National Register of Historic Places in North Dakota. There are listings in 52 of North Dakota's 53 counties.

Contents: Counties in North Dakota
Adams | Barnes | Benson | Billings | Bottineau | Bowman | Burke | Burleigh | Cass | Cavalier | Dickey | Divide | Dunn | Eddy | Emmons | Foster | Golden Valley | Grand Forks | Grant | Griggs | Hettinger | Kidder | LaMoure | Logan | McHenry | McIntosh | McKenzie | McLean | Mercer | Morton | Mountrail | Nelson | Oliver | Pembina | Pierce | Ramsey | Ransom | Renville | Richland | Rolette | Sargent | Sheridan | Sioux | Slope | Stark | Steele | Stutsman | Towner | Traill | Walsh | Ward | Wells | Williams

This National Park Service list is complete through NPS recent listings posted October 23, 2026.

== Current listings by county ==
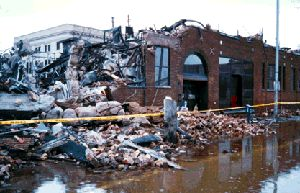
Grand Forks Herald

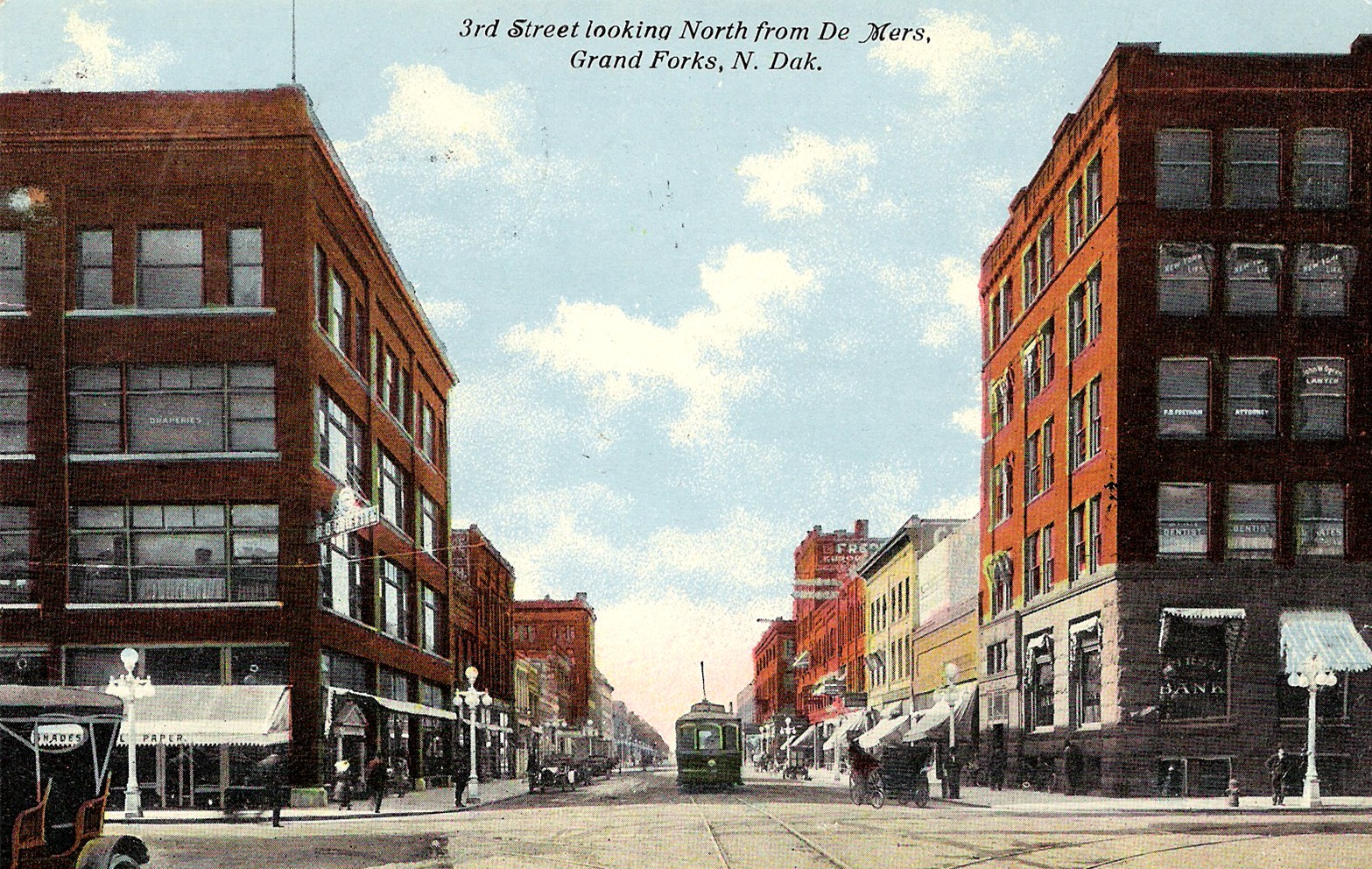
Downtown Grand Forks Historic District

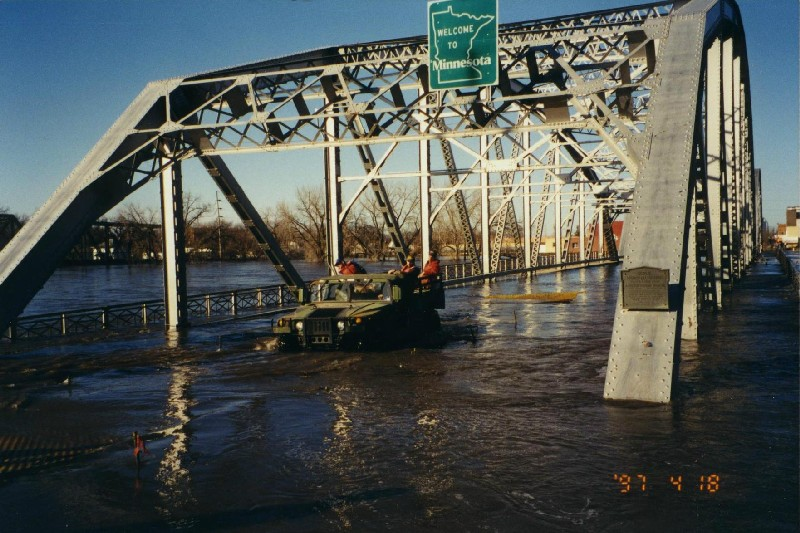
Sorlie Memorial Bridge

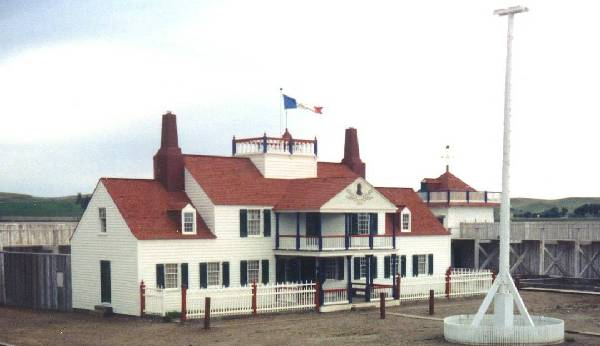
Fort Union Trading Post National Historic Site

The following are approximate tallies of current listings by county. These counts are based on entries in the National Register Information Database as of April 24, 2008 and new weekly listings posted since then on the National Register of Historic Places web site. There are frequent additions to the listings and occasional delistings and the counts here are approximate and not official. New entries are added to the official Register on a weekly basis. Also, the counts in this table exclude boundary increase and decrease listings which modify the area covered by an existing property or district and which carry a separate National Register reference number. The numbers of NRHP listings in each county are documented by tables in each of the individual county list-articles.

	County	# of Sites	Region
1	Adams	3	Missouri Plateau
2	Barnes	13	Drift Prairie
3	Benson	7	Drift Prairie
4	Billings	12	Missouri Plateau
5	Bottineau	4	Drift Prairie
6	Bowman	2	Missouri Plateau
7	Burke	4	Drift Prairie
8	Burleigh	28	Missouri Plateau
9	Cass	38	Red River Valley
10	Cavalier	3	Drift Prairie
11	Dickey	8	Drift Prairie
12	Divide	5	Missouri Plateau
13	Dunn	4	Missouri Plateau
14	Eddy	5	Drift Prairie
15	Emmons	17	Missouri Plateau
16	Foster	6	Drift Prairie
17	Golden Valley	2	Missouri Plateau
18	Grand Forks	68	Red River Valley
19	Grant	4	Missouri Plateau
20	Griggs	4	Drift Prairie
21	Hettinger	6	Missouri Plateau
22	Kidder	4	Missouri Plateau
23	LaMoure	2	Drift Prairie
24	Logan	2	Missouri Plateau
25	McHenry	12	Drift Prairie
26	McIntosh	8	Missouri Plateau
27	McKenzie	4	Missouri Plateau
28	McLean	8	Missouri Plateau
29	Mercer	8	Missouri Plateau
30	Morton	10	Missouri Plateau
31	Mountrail	5	Missouri Plateau
32	Nelson	6	Drift Prairie
33	Oliver	1	Missouri Plateau
34	Pembina	13	Red River Valley
35	Pierce	7	Drift Prairie
36	Ramsey	15	Drift Prairie
37	Ransom	9	Drift Prairie
38	Renville	2	Drift Prairie
39	Richland	10	Red River Valley
40	Rolette	3	Drift Prairie
41	Sargent	1	Drift Prairie
42	Sheridan	2	Missouri Plateau
43	Sioux	0	Missouri Plateau
44	Slope	2	Missouri Plateau
45	Stark	5	Missouri Plateau
46	Steele	3	Drift Prairie
47	Stutsman	10	Drift Prairie
48	Towner	2	Drift Prairie
49	Traill	21	Red River Valley
50	Walsh	15	Red River Valley
51	Ward	14	Drift Prairie
52	Wells	7	Drift Prairie
53	Williams	8	Missouri Plateau
(duplicates)		(3)	
TOTAL		467	

== Adams County ==
	Name on the Register	Image	Date listed	Location	City or town	Description
1	Adams County Courthouse	Adams County Courthouse	November 14, 1985 (#85002977)	600 Adams Ave. 46°00′05″N 102°38′04″W	Hettinger	
2	Cedar Creek Bridge	Cedar Creek Bridge	February 27, 1997 (#97000168)	Unnamed county road across Cedar Creek, approximately 6 miles north and 11 miles east of Haynes; 46°03′02″N 102°13′37″W	Haynes	
3	United States Post Office-Hettinger		November 1, 1989 (#89001751)	Lake St. and Adams Ave. 46°00′05″N 102°38′10″W	Hettinger	

== Benson County ==
	Name on the Register	Image	Date listed	Location	City or town	Description
1	Benson County Courthouse	Benson County Courthouse	November 2, 1978 (#78001988)	B Ave. 48°04′08″N 99°14′59″W	Minnewaukan	
2	Fort Totten State Historic Site	Fort Totten State Historic Site	December 9, 1971 (#71000629)	South of Fort Totten off ND 57; 47°58′39″N 98°59′35″W	Fort Totten	
3	Grace Episcopal Church		September 9, 1994 (#94001072)	210 C Ave., S. 48°04′14″N 99°14′51″W	Minnewaukan	
4	Pierson Farm		August 29, 1985 (#85001939)	3.5 miles south of York off U.S. Route 2; 48°15′42″N 99°34′06″W	York	
5	St. Boniface Cemetery, Wrought-Iron Cross Site	St. Boniface Cemetery, Wrought-Iron Cross Site	October 23, 1989 (#89001686)	Address Restricted	Selz	
6	Viking Lutheran Church	Viking Lutheran Church	November 14, 1979 (#79001768)	Southeast of Maddock; 47°51′44″N 99°29′23″W	Maddock	
7	West Antelope Bridge		February 27, 1997 (#97000171)	Unnamed county road across the Sheyenne River, approximately 30 miles southeast of the junction of U.S. Route 2 and ND 30; 47°53′12″N 99°23′05″W	Flora	

== Billings County ==
	Name on the Register	Image	Date listed	Location	City or town	Description
1	Billings County Courthouse	Billings County Courthouse	December 16, 1977 (#77001016)	4th St. and 4th Ave. 46°54′46″N 103°31′20″W	Medora	part of the North Dakota County Courthouses Thematic Resource (TR)
2	Chateau de Mores	Chateau de Mores	April 16, 1975 (#75001299)	Southwest of Medora on the western bank of the Little Missouri River; 46°54′40″N 103°31′57″W	Medora	
3	Custer Military Trail Historic Archaeological District	Custer Military Trail Historic Archaeological District	June 5, 2009 (#08001293)	Multiple locations south of Medora	Medora	Includes sites in Golden Valley County.
4	De Mores Memorial Park	De Mores Memorial Park	March 4, 2019 (#100003204)	SE corner of Main St. & 3rd Ave. 46°54′49″N 103°31′17″W	Medora	
5	De Mores Packing Plant Ruins	De Mores Packing Plant Ruins	February 18, 1975 (#75001300)	Northwest of the Medora boundary 46°55′01″N 103°31′41″W	Medora	Now Chimney Park
6	Initial Rock	Initial Rock	November 7, 1976 (#76002271)	Southeast of Medora in Little Missouri National Grassland; 46°48′28″N 103°24′39″W	Medora	
7	Myers School Timbered Lodge (32BI401)	Myers School Timbered Lodge (32BI401)	August 6, 1980 (#80002906)	Address Restricted	Medora	
8	Peaceful Valley Ranch	Peaceful Valley Ranch	July 13, 1994 (#94000731)	North of Medora near the Little Missouri River in Theodore Roosevelt National Park; 46°57′32″N 103°30′13″W	Medora	
9	Theodore Roosevelt's Elkhorn Ranch and Greater Elkhorn Ranchlands	Theodore Roosevelt's Elkhorn Ranch and Greater Elkhorn Ranchlands	September 28, 2012 (#12000252)	Off Bear Lake Road, 35 miles north of Medora; 47°14′22″N 103°37′27″W	Medora	Now a unit of Theodore Roosevelt National Park.
10	St. Mary's Catholic Church	St. Mary's Catholic Church	December 2, 1977 (#77001017)	4th St. and 3rd Ave. 46°54′52″N 103°31′20″W	Medora	
11	Short Ranch Historic District		July 23, 2026 (#100013187)	Wannagan Creek Road; 47°10′08″N 103°34′48″W	Medora vicinity	
12	Von Hoffman House	Von Hoffman House	November 21, 1977 (#77001018)	Broadway and 5th St. 46°54′50″N 103°31′17″W	Medora	

== Bottineau County ==
	Name on the Register	Image	Date listed	Location	City or town	Description
1	Ole Crogen Farm District		October 16, 1987 (#87001779)	4 miles northwest of Bottineau; 48°53′00″N 100°31′45″W	Carbury & Bottineau	
2	Old Main, North Dakota School of Forestry	Old Main, North Dakota School of Forestry	September 1, 2006 (#06000532)	Alexander St. (north of terminus with 2nd St.); 48°50′03″N 100°26′25″W	Bottineau	
3	State Bank of Antler	State Bank of Antler	April 15, 2019 (#100003620)	Antler Sq. 48°59′10″N 100°37′18″W	Antler	Relisting of previously listed building (refnum 88000986).
4	Swedish Zion Lutheran Church		April 1, 2013 (#13000138)	32 rods from NE. corner of SE. corner T164N, R77W, sec34. 48°59′10″N 100°37′18″W	Souris	

== Bowman County ==
	Name on the Register	Image	Date listed	Location	City or town	Description
1	Fort Dilts	Fort Dilts	November 10, 1980 (#80002907)	Fort Dilts Road; 46°16′43″N 103°46′33″W	Rhame	
2	Emma Petznick and Otto Schade House		April 16, 2008 (#08000313)	406 W. Divide; 46°10′56″N 103°24′04″W	Bowman	

== Burke County ==
	Name on the Register	Image	Date listed	Location	City or town	Description
1	Burke County Courthouse	Burke County Courthouse	November 14, 1985 (#85002979)	Main St. 48°48′03″N 102°14′53″W	Bowbells	
2	Burke County World War Memorial Hall	Burke County World War Memorial Hall	January 4, 2018 (#100001952)	101 1st St. 48°53′58″N 102°23′36″W	Flaxton	
3	William E. Metzger House		August 22, 2007 (#07000841)	112 Makee St. 48°59′49″N 102°33′11″W	Portal	
4	Portal State Bank	Portal State Bank	October 3, 1996 (#96001067)	19 Main St. 48°59′45″N 102°32′54″W	Portal	

=== Former listing ===
	Name on the Register	Image	Date listed	Date removed	Location	City or town	Description
1	Flaxton Hotel		August 16, 1977 (#77001019)	June 30, 1987	Davis St.	Flaxton	

== Cavalier County ==
	Name on the Register	Image	Date listed	Location	City or town	Description
1	Roxy Theatre	Roxy Theatre	November 18, 1998 (#98001341)	714 3rd St. 48°45′35″N 98°22′06″W	Langdon	
2	RSL-3	RSL-3	October 23, 2018 (#100003053)	12329 ND 5; 48°45′41″N 97°57′00″W	Concrete vicinity	Remote Sprint Launch facility, part of the Safeguard missile defense program.
3	US Post Office-Langdon		November 1, 1989 (#89001752)	323 8th Ave. 48°45′41″N 98°22′08″W	Langdon	

== Dickey County ==
	Name on the Register	Image	Date listed	Location	City or town	Description
1	Carroll House Hotel	Carroll House Hotel	March 17, 1994 (#94000221)	19 N. Monroe St. 46°09′44″N 98°25′37″W	Fullerton	
2	Dickey County Courthouse	Dickey County Courthouse	November 25, 1980 (#80004283)	Off U.S. Route 281; 46°00′15″N 98°31′24″W	Ellendale	
3	Ellendale Opera House Block	Ellendale Opera House Block	April 22, 1992 (#92000354)	105-111 Main St. 46°00′06″N 98°31′42″W	Ellendale	
4	Klein and Sutmar Block	Klein and Sutmar Block	October 16, 1987 (#87001792)	419 Main Ave. 46°08′21″N 98°05′38″W	Oakes	
5	Walter T. Noonan House		October 16, 1987 (#87001791)	215 S. 7th St. 46°08′10″N 98°05′28″W	Oakes	
6	Oakes National Bank Block	Oakes National Bank Block	October 16, 1987 (#87001790)	501 Main Ave. 46°08′21″N 98°05′36″W	Oakes	
7	US Post Office-Oakes	US Post Office-Oakes	November 1, 1989 (#89001753)	611 Main Ave. 46°08′21″N 98°05′29″W	Oakes	
8	Whitestone Hill State Historic Site	Whitestone Hill State Historic Site	November 5, 2013 (#13000861)	7310 86th St SE; 46°10′11″N 98°51′19″W	Kulm	Federal Relief Construction in North Dakota, 1931-1943, MPS

== Divide County ==
	Name on the Register	Image	Date listed	Location	City or town	Description
1	Alkabo School	Alkabo School	December 7, 2010 (#10000997)	North end of Main St. 48°51′58″N 103°53′12″W	Alkabo	Federal Relief Construction in North Dakota, 1931-1943, MPS
2	Divide County Courthouse	Divide County Courthouse	November 25, 1980 (#80002910)	In Crosby; 48°54′55″N 103°17′38″W	Crosby	
3	Niels Nielsen Fourteen-Side Barn Farm	Niels Nielsen Fourteen-Side Barn Farm	October 7, 1986 (#86002743)	ND 38; 48°49′54″N 102°57′33″W	Noonan	
4	Travelers Hotel	Travelers Hotel	July 6, 2010 (#10000423)	121 Main St; 48°49′54″N 102°57′33″W	Noonan	
5	Ambrose–Torquay Border Crossing	Ambrose–Torquay Border Crossing	September 10, 2014 (#14000587)	ND42; 48°59′52″N 103°29′14″W	Ambrose	

== Dunn County ==
	Name on the Register	Image	Date listed	Location	City or town	Description
1	Hutmacher Farm		December 17, 1979 (#79001772)	Northwest of Manning; 47°16′45″N 102°55′39″W	Manning	
2	Independence Congregational Church		July 14, 2015 (#15000422)	BIA Rd. 13, Fort Berthold Indian Reservation; 47°41′40″N 102°22′35″W	Mandaree vicinity	
3	Lynch Quarry Site	Lynch Quarry Site	July 13, 2011 (#11000629)	448 95th Ave., SW. 47°21′09″N 102°33′22″W	Dunn Center	
4	Saints Peter and Paul Church	Saints Peter and Paul Church	February 3, 1986 (#86000161)	101 Lafayette St. 47°00′02″N 102°53′01″W	New Hradec	

=== Former listing ===
	Name on the Register	Image	Date listed	Date removed	Location	City or town	Description
1	Dunn County Courthouse		March 26, 1986 (#86000620)	October 21, 2009	Owens St. 47°13′53″N 102°46′10″W	Manning	Demolished in 1996.

== Eddy County ==
	Name on the Register	Image	Date listed	Location	City or town	Description
1	Eddy County Courthouse	Eddy County Courthouse	November 14, 1985 (#85002981)	524 Central Ave. 47°40′49″N 99°08′03″W	New Rockford	
2	Sylvanus Marriage Octagonal Barn		October 7, 1986 (#86002748)	ND 38; 47°36′50″N 99°05′50″W	New Rockford	
3	New Rockford Bridge		March 13, 1997 (#97000173)	Across the James River, unnamed county road at its junction with ND 15; 47°41′08″N 99°08′05″W	New Rockford	
4	Sheyenne Bar		January 15, 2026 (#100012548)	114 Main St. 47°49′37″N 99°07′11″W	Sheyenne	
5	US Post Office-New Rockford	US Post Office-New Rockford	November 1, 1989 (#89001750)	821 N. 1st Ave. 47°40′51″N 99°08′21″W	New Rockford	

=== Former listing ===
	Name on the Register	Image	Date listed	Date removed	Location	City or town	Description
1	Jens Myhre Round Barn		October 1, 1986 (#86002749)	July 14, 2015	ND 30; 47°44′46″N 99°12′11″W	New Rockford	

== Foster County ==
	Name on the Register	Image	Date listed	Location	City or town	Description
1	Foster County Courthouse	Foster County Courthouse	November 25, 1980 (#80002911)	1000 5th St. N. 47°27′18″N 99°07′33″W	Carrington	
2	Grace City Bridge		February 27, 1997 (#97000174)	Across the James River, unnamed county road 1 mile southwest of Grace City; 47°32′39″N 98°49′52″W	Grace City	
3	Ralph Hall Farm District		October 1, 1987 (#87001781)	North of Carrington on the western side of Burlington Northern railroad tracks 47°29′42″N 99°08′27″W	Carrington	Both the farmhouse and main barn have been demolished since 1997, leaving the garage as the only remaining contributing building.
4	McHenry Railroad Loop		October 2, 1986 (#86002751)	Eastern side of ND 20; 47°34′42″N 98°35′44″W	McHenry	
5	Thomas Nichols Putnam House	Thomas Nichols Putnam House	November 24, 1992 (#92001604)	533 Main St. 47°26′59″N 99°07′10″W	Carrington	
6	US Post Office-Carrington	US Post Office-Carrington	November 1, 1989 (#89001754)	87 N. 9th Ave. 47°27′01″N 99°07′29″W	Carrington	

=== Former listing ===
	Name on the Register	Image	Date listed	Date removed	Location	City or town	Description
1	Lincoln Building		April 30, 1980 (#80002912)	February 1, 2011	Off U.S. Route 281; 47°27′07″N 99°07′22″W	Carrington	

== Golden Valley County ==
	Name on the Register	Image	Date listed	Location	City or town	Description
1	Custer Military Trail Historic Archaeological District	Custer Military Trail Historic Archaeological District	June 5, 2009 (#08001293)	Multiple locations south and west of Medora	Sentinel Butte	Includes sites in Billings County.
2	Golden Valley County Courthouse	Golden Valley County Courthouse	November 14, 1985 (#85002983)	First Ave., SE. 46°54′48″N 104°00′14″W	Beach	

=== Former listings ===
	Name on the Register	Image	Date listed	Date removed	Location	City or town	Description
1	Sentinel Butte Public School	Sentinel Butte Public School	October 21, 1982 (#82001313)	November 15, 2023	Byron St. 46°55′03″N 103°50′19″W	Sentinel Butte	

== Grant County ==
	Name on the Register	Image	Date listed	Location	City or town	Description
1	Carson Roller Mill	Carson Roller Mill	April 30, 1980 (#80002915)	Southern side of Carson; 46°25′06″N 101°33′50″W	Carson	
2	Evangelical Lutheran Trinity Church	Evangelical Lutheran Trinity Church	September 9, 2009 (#09000530)	63rd St. in the southwestern part of Section 15, Township 135, Range 90; 46°30′04″N 101°58′00″W	New Leipzig	
3	Hope Lutheran Church	Hope Lutheran Church	January 16, 1992 (#91001924)	West of ND 49 south of Lake Tschida; 46°30′02″N 101°51′41″W	Elgin	
4	Medicine Rock State Historic Site		September 25, 1986 (#86002757)	Center of Section 31, Township 133 North, Range 88 West; 46°17′38″N 101°47′23″W	Heil	

== Griggs County ==
	Name on the Register	Image	Date listed	Location	City or town	Description
1	Griggs County Courthouse	Griggs County Courthouse	July 21, 1977 (#77001025)	Rollin Ave. 47°26′31″N 98°07′27″W	Cooperstown	
2	Northern Lights Masonic Lodge	Northern Lights Masonic Lodge	October 16, 1987 (#87001775)	9th St. 47°26′36″N 98°07′23″W	Cooperstown	
3	Oscar-Zero Missile Alert Facility	Oscar-Zero Missile Alert Facility	October 14, 2008 (#08000994)	ND 45, 4.5 miles north of Cooperstown; 47°30′27″N 98°07′55″W	Cooperstown	Missile launch control center of the U.S. Air Force 321st Missile Wing
4	Romness Bridge	Romness Bridge	February 27, 1997 (#97000179)	Unnamed county road across the Sheyenne River, approximately 8 miles north and 1 mile east of Cooperstown; 47°34′22″N 98°05′37″W	Cooperstown	

== Hettinger County ==
	Name on the Register	Image	Date listed	Location	City or town	Description
1	Andrew Erickson Barn		December 26, 2023 (#100009697)	1104 7th St NE; 46°09′07″N 102°31′05″W	Hettinger	
2	Hettinger County Courthouse	Hettinger County Courthouse	November 14, 1985 (#85002984)	336 Pacific St. 46°22′29″N 102°19′43″W	Mott	
3	Dr. S.W. Hill Drug Store	Dr. S.W. Hill Drug Store	November 10, 1980 (#80002916)	Off ND 21; 46°25′20″N 102°33′18″W	Regent	
4	Neuburg Congregational Church	Neuburg Congregational Church	August 15, 2007 (#07000822)	83rd Ave., SW. and 57 St., SW. 46°35′16″N 102°09′24″W	Mott	
5	Riverside	Riverside	May 12, 1983 (#83001937)	418 Main St. 46°32′06″N 102°52′03″W	New England	
6	John and Fredricka (Roth) Stern Homestead	John and Fredricka (Roth) Stern Homestead	September 19, 2008 (#08000902)	2 miles east of Mott on ND 21; 46°22′19″N 102°16′28″W	Mott	

== Kidder County ==
	Name on the Register	Image	Date listed	Location	City or town	Description
1	Crystal Springs Fountain	Crystal Springs Fountain	December 7, 2010 (#10000999)	1 mile northeast from Crystal Springs on old US 10; 46°52′48″N 99°27′26″W	Crystal Springs	Federal Relief Construction in North Dakota, 1931-1943, MPS
2	First Presbyterian Church of Steele	First Presbyterian Church of Steele	May 19, 2004 (#04000467)	Mitchell Ave., N., and 1st St. 46°51′23″N 99°54′57″W	Steele	
3	Kidder County Courthouse	Kidder County Courthouse	November 14, 1985 (#85002985)	Broadway Ave. 46°51′16″N 99°54′53″W	Steele	
4	Robinson Hall	Robinson Hall	March 26, 2018 (#100002253)	118 Main St. 47°08′35″N 99°46′52″W	Robinson	

== LaMoure County ==
	Name on the Register	Image	Date listed	Location	City or town	Description
1	Dagen's Grocery	Dagen's Grocery	July 6, 2005 (#05000659)	616 Central Ave. 46°31′38″N 98°53′49″W	Jud	
2	La Moure County Courthouse	La Moure County Courthouse	November 25, 1980 (#80004284)	In LaMoure; 46°21′45″N 98°17′28″W	LaMoure	

=== Former listing ===
	Name on the Register	Image	Date listed	Date removed	Location	City or town	Description
1	Rodman Octagonal Barn		October 7, 1986 (#86002753)	July 14, 2015	ND 30; 46°24′33″N 98°47′17″W	Edgeley	

== Logan County ==
	Name on the Register	Image	Date listed	Location	City or town	Description
1	Robert Abell Round Barn		October 7, 1986 (#86002754)	ND 38; 46°22′35″N 99°28′29″W	Burnstad	
2	Logan County Courthouse		November 14, 1985 (#85002986)	301 Broadway; 46°30′12″N 99°46′06″W	Napoleon	

== McIntosh County ==
	Name on the Register	Image	Date listed	Location	City or town	Description
1	Ashley Jewish Homesteaders Cemetery		November 17, 2015 (#15000807)	48th Ave., SE. 46°04′42″N 99°22′44″W	Ashley	
2	McIntosh County Courthouse	McIntosh County Courthouse	November 25, 1980 (#80002918)	112 1st St. NE; 46°02′09″N 99°22′16″W	Ashley	
3	St. Andrews Evangelical German Lutheran Church		July 12, 1990 (#90001027)	West of ND 3 near the South Branch of Beaver Creek; 46°06′53″N 99°46′21″W	Zeeland	
4	St. John's Cemetery, Wrought-Iron Cross Site A	St. John's Cemetery, Wrought-Iron Cross Site A	October 23, 1989 (#89001687)	Address Restricted	Zeeland	
5	St. John's Cemetery, Wrought-Iron Cross Site B	St. John's Cemetery, Wrought-Iron Cross Site B	October 23, 1989 (#89001688)	Address Restricted	Zeeland	
6	St. John's Cemetery, Wrought-Iron Cross Site C	St. John's Cemetery, Wrought-Iron Cross Site C	October 23, 1989 (#89001689)	Address Restricted	Zeeland	
7	St. John's Cemetery, Wrought-Iron Cross Site D	St. John's Cemetery, Wrought-Iron Cross Site D	October 23, 1989 (#89001690)	Address Restricted	Zeeland	
8	Zeeland Hall	Zeeland Hall	June 14, 2016 (#16000368)	211 S. Main Ave. 45°58′19″N 99°49′49″W	Zeeland	

=== Former listing ===
	Name on the Register	Image	Date listed	Date removed	Location	City or town	Description
1	Old Wishek City Hall	Old Wishek City Hall	October 4, 2005 (#05001141)	July 14, 2015	21 Centennial St. 46°15′30″N 99°33′28″W	Wishek	Demolished c. 2011.

== McKenzie County ==
	Name on the Register	Image	Date listed	Location	City or town	Description
1	Fairview Lift Bridge	Fairview Lift Bridge	March 14, 1997 (#97000239)	Abandoned railroad line over the Yellowstone River, approximately 0.75 miles south of ND 200; 47°55′44″N 103°57′55″W	Cartwright	
2	Fort Union Trading Post National Historic Site	Fort Union Trading Post National Historic Site	October 15, 1966 (#66000103)	15550 Highway 1804; 47°59′58″N 104°02′13″W	Williston vicinity	
3	Grassy Butte Post Office	Grassy Butte Post Office	November 26, 1980 (#80002919)	Off U.S. Route 85; 47°23′39″N 103°14′48″W	Grassy Butte	
4	Sandstone School		April 11, 2008 (#08000278)	29th St., NW. 47°50′27″N 103°19′21″W	Keene	

== McLean County ==
	Name on the Register	Image	Date listed	Location	City or town	Description
1	Fort Buford Stage Road		October 25, 2019 (#100004540)	Fort Buford Stage Rd.	Washburn	
2	Holy Trinity Ukrainian Greek Orthodox Church	Holy Trinity Ukrainian Greek Orthodox Church	October 22, 1982 (#82001344)	Bismarck Ave. and 6th St. 47°09′35″N 100°47′24″W	Wilton	
3	Ingersoll School	Ingersoll School	March 31, 2010 (#10000139)	11 miles north on Alt 200, right 2 miles on Hwy 200, turn right for .4 mile on gravel 47°27′06″N 100°59′32″W	Washburn	
4	Schlafmann Barn		December 13, 2022 (#100008472)	696 16th Ave. NW; 47°30′51″N 100°53′06″W	Turtle Lake	
5	Semevolos Farm		October 16, 1987 (#87001788)	Southeast of Butte; 47°49′47″N 100°36′35″W	Butte	
6	Soo Line Depot	Soo Line Depot	March 29, 1978 (#78003079)	1st St. and McLean Ave. 47°09′32″N 100°46′59″W	Wilton	
7	Freborg Homestead	Freborg Homestead	September 10, 2014 (#14000625)	3231 2ndt St. NW; 47°26′39″N 101°15′10″W	Underwood	
8	Zion Lutheran Cemetery, Wrought-Iron Cross Site	Zion Lutheran Cemetery, Wrought-Iron Cross Site	October 23, 1989 (#89001684)	Address Restricted	Mercer	

=== Former listings ===
	Name on the Register	Image	Date listed	Date removed	Location	City or town	Description
1	Former McLean County Courthouse	Former McLean County Courthouse	November 14, 1985 (#85002987)	December 23, 2021	Main St. 47°17′23″N 101°01′44″W	Washburn	
2	McLean County Courthouse	McLean County Courthouse	November 14, 1985 (#85002998)	June 15, 2013	5th Ave. 47°17′27″N 101°01′34″W	Washburn	Demolished in 2013.

== Mercer County ==
	Name on the Register	Image	Date listed	Location	City or town	Description
1	Beulah School	Beulah School	September 30, 1997 (#97001200)	205 2nd St., NW. 47°15′54″N 101°46′48″W	Beulah	
2	Big Hidatsa Village Site	Big Hidatsa Village Site	October 15, 1966 (#66000600)	Northern bank of the Knife River, 1 mile north of Stanton; 47°21′42″N 101°23′18″W	Stanton	
3	Fort Clark Archeological District	Fort Clark Archeological District	October 19, 1986 (#86002800)	ND 200 Alternate; 47°15′10″N 101°16′27″W	Stanton	
4	High Butte Effigy and Village Site (32ME13)	High Butte Effigy and Village Site (32ME13)	May 22, 1978 (#78001991)	Address Restricted	Riverdale	
5	Knife River Bridge near Stanton		April 25, 2001 (#01000428)	County road 4 miles west and 1 mile north of Stanton; 47°19′36″N 101°28′07″W	Stanton	
6	Knife River Indian Villages National Historic Site Archeological District	Knife River Indian Villages National Historic Site Archeological District	October 26, 1974 (#74002220)	North of Stanton on both sides of the Knife River; 47°20′23″N 101°22′56″W	Stanton	
7	Fred Krause House	Fred Krause House	April 14, 1992 (#92000344)	321 W. Main St. 47°17′39″N 101°37′43″W	Hazen	
8	St. Paul's Lutheran Church	St. Paul's Lutheran Church	June 25, 2005 (#05000625)	4474 1st, NW. 47°25′53″N 101°29′54″W	Hazen	

=== Former listing ===
	Name on the Register	Image	Date listed	Date removed	Location	City or town	Description
1	Hazen High School		August 12, 1977 (#77001026)	March 15, 1991	400 Central Ave.	Hazen	

== Morton County ==
	Name on the Register	Image	Date listed	Location	City or town	Description
1	Stuart Dunlap House		June 8, 1992 (#92000587)	201 7th Ave. 46°49′34″N 100°54′02″W	Mandan	
2	German Evangelical St. Johns Church	German Evangelical St. Johns Church	January 11, 2001 (#00001642)	624 Church Ave. 46°54′13″N 102°02′48″W	Hebron	
3	Hotel Brown	Hotel Brown	June 23, 2014 (#14000335)	202 Main St. N. 46°27′15″N 101°13′56″W	Flasher	
4	Huff State Historic Site (32MO11)	Huff State Historic Site (32MO11)	July 23, 1980 (#80002920)	Southeast of Huff; 46°37′07″N 100°38′32″W	Huff	
5	Lewis and Clark Hotel	Lewis and Clark Hotel	May 9, 1983 (#83001938)	404 W. Main St. 46°49′33″N 100°53′40″W	Mandan	
6	Mandan Commercial Historic District	Mandan Commercial Historic District	February 21, 1985 (#85000341)	Roughly bounded by Main and 1st Sts. between 1st Ave., NE. and 4th Ave., NW. 46°49′36″N 100°53′35″W	Mandan	
7	Mandan High School	Mandan High School	July 24, 2017 (#100001364)	406 4th St. 46°49′49″N 100°53′46″W	Mandan	
8	Louis Rehm Barn	Louis Rehm Barn	January 31, 1994 (#93001550)	2.5 miles north of Hebron; 46°55′36″N 102°03′48″W	Hebron	
9	Sunnyside Farm Barn		January 19, 1996 (#95001550)	Approximately 1.7 miles west of Mandan, 0.5 miles south of W. Main St. on the southern side of Dead Heart Slough; 46°49′14″N 100°56′49″W	Mandan	
10	Welsh House		April 22, 1980 (#80002921)	208 5th Ave., NW. 46°49′38″N 100°53′49″W	Mandan	

=== Former listing ===
	Name on the Register	Image	Date listed	Date removed	Location	City or town	Description
1	State Training School Historic District		January 19, 1996 (#95001549)	July 16, 2018	Western bank of the Heart River, 0.5 miles south of W. Main St., on the western edge of Mandan; 46°48′32″N 100°54′49″W	Mandan	

== Mountrail County ==
	Name on the Register	Image	Date listed	Location	City or town	Description
1	Assyrian Muslim Cemetery	Assyrian Muslim Cemetery	July 17, 2018 (#100002693)	1/4 mi. S of US 2 on 87th Ave. NW; 48°18′20″N 102°30′17″W	Ross vicinity	
2	Evans Site	Evans Site	February 8, 1980 (#80002922)	Address Restricted	New Town	
3	Great Northern Railway Underpass	Great Northern Railway Underpass	February 27, 1997 (#97000182)	Burlington Northern Santa Fe Railway tracks over ND 8 at the northern end of Stanley; 48°19′11″N 102°23′24″W	Stanley	
4	Mountrail County Courthouse	Mountrail County Courthouse	December 22, 1978 (#78001992)	N. Main St. 48°19′16″N 102°23′27″W	Stanley	
5	Wabek Consolidated School	Wabek Consolidated School	October 22, 2019 (#100004541)	3825 64th Ave. NW; 47°58′01″N 101°57′30″W	Plaza vicinity	Two-room schoolhouse formed by moving two one-room schoolhouses together in 1917

== Nelson County ==
	Name on the Register	Image	Date listed	Location	City or town	Description
1	Episcopal Church of the Good Shepard-Lakota	Episcopal Church of the Good Shepard-Lakota	October 10, 2017 (#100001743)	216 D Ave. W. 48°02′37″N 98°20′44″W	Lakota	
2	Nesheim Bridge		February 27, 1997 (#97000185)	Unnamed county road across the Sheyenne River, approximately 2 miles southwest of McVille; 47°44′15″N 98°13′06″W	McVille	
3	Old Settler's Pavilion		June 12, 2010 (#10000366)	63 Pavilion Rd. 47°52′13″N 98°21′20″W	Pekin	
4	Nels Ophaug Barn		October 24, 2024 (#100010902)	3087 116th Ave NE; 47°51′31″N 98°05′50″W	McVille	
5	Petersburg Auditorium		September 25, 2025 (#100012309)	116 5th Street; 48°00′44″N 98°00′03″W	Petersburg	
6	Tofthagen Library Museum	Tofthagen Library Museum	September 26, 1991 (#91001467)	116 W. B Ave. 48°02′30″N 98°20′41″W	Lakota	

== Oliver County ==
	Name on the Register	Image	Date listed	Location	City or town	Description
1	Cross Ranch Archeological District		November 4, 1985 (#85003484)	Cross Ranch Nature Preserve; 47°13′00″N 101°00′00″W	Hensler	

== Pierce County ==
	Name on the Register	Image	Date listed	Location	City or town	Description
1	Great Northern Passenger Depot	Great Northern Passenger Depot	September 26, 1991 (#91001466)	201 W. Dewey St. 48°22′10″N 99°59′50″W	Rugby	
2	Old Mt. Carmel Cemetery, Wrought-Iron Cross Site	Old Mt. Carmel Cemetery, Wrought-Iron Cross Site	October 23, 1989 (#89001685)	Address Restricted	Balta	
3	Pierce County Courthouse	Pierce County Courthouse	November 25, 1980 (#80002924)	In Rugby; 48°22′06″N 99°59′26″W	Rugby	
4	St. Anselm's Cemetery, Wrought-Iron Cross Site	St. Anselm's Cemetery, Wrought-Iron Cross Site	October 23, 1989 (#89001681)	Address Restricted	Berwick	
5	St. Mathias Cemetery, Wrought-Iron Cross Site	St. Mathias Cemetery, Wrought-Iron Cross Site	October 23, 1989 (#89001680)	Address Restricted	Orrin	
6	St. Paul's Episcopal Church		December 3, 1992 (#92001608)	404 DeSmet St., now 312 2nd Ave., S.W. 48°21′58″N 99°59′55″W	Rugby	
7	US Post Office-Rugby	US Post Office-Rugby	November 1, 1989 (#89001748)	205 SE. 2nd St. 48°22′12″N 99°59′38″W	Rugby	

== Ransom County ==
	Name on the Register	Image	Date listed	Location	City or town	Description
1	Biesterfeldt Site (32RM1)		February 8, 1980 (#80002925)	Southern side of the Sheyenne River along 140th Ave. 46°23′46″N 97°29′11″W	Lisbon	
2	Bradford Hotel	Bradford Hotel	October 1, 1987 (#87001766)	18 4th Ave. W. 46°26′34″N 97°40′56″W	Lisbon	
3	Colton's Crossing Bridge		February 27, 1997 (#97000186)	Unnamed county road across the Sheyenne River, approximately 2 miles south and 2 miles east of Lisbon; 46°23′02″N 97°37′58″W	Lisbon	
4	Lisbon Bridge	Lisbon Bridge	February 27, 1997 (#97000184)	Across the Sheyenne River, ND 32 at the northern end of Lisbon; 46°26′49″N 97°40′52″W	Lisbon	
5	Lisbon Opera House	Lisbon Opera House	October 18, 1979 (#79003727)	413 Main Ave. 46°26′32″N 97°40′50″W	Lisbon	
6	Mizpah Lodge Building		August 24, 2005 (#05000913)	260 Front St. 46°40′44″N 98°42′53″W	Sheldon	
7	Ransom County Courthouse	Ransom County Courthouse	November 25, 1985 (#85002988)	5th Ave., W. 46°26′32″N 97°41′04″W	Lisbon	
8	US Post Office-Lisbon	US Post Office-Lisbon	November 1, 1989 (#89001749)	17 W. 4th Ave. 46°26′32″N 97°40′55″W	Lisbon	
9	T. J. Walker Historic District	T. J. Walker Historic District	December 5, 1979 (#79001774)	At the Sheyenne River; 46°31′18″N 97°55′49″W	Fort Ransom	

== Renville County ==
	Name on the Register	Image	Date listed	Location	City or town	Description
1	McKinney Cemetery		December 28, 1978 (#78001994)	North of Tolley; 48°45′33″N 101°47′01″W	Tolley	
2	Renville County Courthouse	Renville County Courthouse	November 25, 1985 (#85002989)	Main St. 48°45′49″N 101°30′32″W	Mohall	

== Rolette County ==
	Name on the Register	Image	Date listed	Location	City or town	Description
1	Urbain Cote Round Barn	Urbain Cote Round Barn	October 7, 1986 (#86002755)	ND 38; 47°38′40″N 100°03′30″W	Dunseith	
2	Coghlan Castle	Coghlan Castle	July 16, 2008 (#08000681)	Lot 2, SW 1/4 of the NW 1/4 T163N R69W Section 19; 48°55′49″N 99°39′18″W	St. John	
3	U.S. Inspection Station-St. John, North Dakota	U.S. Inspection Station-St. John, North Dakota	September 10, 2014 (#14000588)	ND 30; 48°59′56″N 99°39′31″W	St. John	

== Sargent County ==
	Name on the Register	Image	Date listed	Location	City or town	Description
1	Sargent County Courthouse	Sargent County Courthouse	November 25, 1980 (#80002927)	355 Main St S 46°06′23″N 97°38′13″W	Forman	

== Sheridan County ==
	Name on the Register	Image	Date listed	Location	City or town	Description
1	Clark House		June 25, 2013 (#13000453)	322 McKinley Ave; 47°28′27″N 100°07′37″W	Goodrich	
2	Sheridan County Courthouse	Sheridan County Courthouse	November 25, 1985 (#85002990)	215 E. 2nd St. 47°29′04″N 100°26′25″W	McClusky	

=== Former listing ===
	Name on the Register	Image	Date listed	Date removed	Location	City or town	Description
1	Winter House		November 29, 1979 (#79001775)	April 1, 2009	Northeastern Sheridan County; 47°38′12″N 100°05′01″W	Goodrich	

== Sioux County ==
Sioux County has no current listings on the National Register.

=== Former listing ===
	Name on the Register	Image	Date listed	Date removed	Location	City or town	Description
1	Former Sioux County Courthouse	Former Sioux County Courthouse	November 19, 1985 (#85002993)	October 21, 2009	Belden St. 46°05′08″N 100°37′51″W	Fort Yates	NRHP nomination termed this "rather plain" but suggested it was worthwhile to list in order to promote local awareness of historic preservation, given no nearby NRHP listings

== Slope County ==
	Name on the Register	Image	Date listed	Location	City or town	Description
1	H-T Ranch		July 5, 1985 (#85001491)	10 miles west of Amidon; 46°29′22″N 103°31′56″W	Amidon	
2	Mystic Theatre	Mystic Theatre	September 13, 1977 (#77001029)	Main St. 46°17′49″N 103°55′29″W	Marmarth	

=== Former listing ===
	Name on the Register	Image	Date listed	Date removed	Location	City or town	Description
1	Original Slope County Courthouse	Original Slope County Courthouse	November 14, 1985 (#85002994)	April 3, 2015	2nd St. 46°28′54″N 103°19′19″W	Amidon	Was the last standing wooden courthouse in North Dakota. Demolished in October 2014.

== Stark County ==
	Name on the Register	Image	Date listed	Location	City or town	Description
1	Dickinson (Carnegie Area) Public Library	Dickinson (Carnegie Area) Public Library	July 31, 2008 (#08000735)	139 3rd St., W. 46°52′55″N 102°47′14″W	Dickinson	
2	Dickinson State Normal School Campus District	Dickinson State Normal School Campus District	March 28, 1997 (#97000285)	Roughly bounded by State Ave., Fairway St., 8th Ave., W., and 2nd St., W. 46°52′56″N 102°47′54″W	Dickinson	
3	Elks Club and Store Building–Dickenson Lodge No. 1137	Elks Club and Store Building–Dickenson Lodge No. 1137	April 11, 2008 (#08000280)	103 1st Ave., W. 46°52′48″N 102°47′13″W	Dickinson	
4	Stark County Courthouse	Stark County Courthouse	November 25, 1985 (#85002991)	3rd St., N. 46°52′56″N 102°47′02″W	Dickinson	
5	US Post Office-Dickinson	US Post Office-Dickinson	November 1, 1989 (#89001757)	15 E. 1st St. 46°52′48″N 102°47′02″W	Dickinson	

=== Former listing ===
	Name on the Register	Image	Date listed	Date removed	Location	City or town	Description
1	Gerhardt Octagonal Pig House		October 7, 1986 (#86002758)	July 14, 2015	ND 38; 46°52′28″N 102°29′37″W	Gladstone	

== Steele County ==
	Name on the Register	Image	Date listed	Location	City or town	Description
1	Baldwin's Arcade	Baldwin's Arcade	February 18, 1975 (#75001306)	Steele Ave. and 3rd St. 47°19′21″N 97°43′15″W	Hope	
2	Beaver Creek Bridge		February 27, 1997 (#97000183)	Unnamed county road across Beaver Creek, approximately 13 miles east and 4 miles north of Finley; 47°35′16″N 97°33′28″W	Finley	
3	Steele County Courthouse	Steele County Courthouse	November 14, 1985 (#85002995)	201 Washington Ave. 47°30′52″N 97°50′16″W	Finley	

== Towner County ==
	Name on the Register	Image	Date listed	Location	City or town	Description
1	Towner County Courthouse	Towner County Courthouse	November 14, 1985 (#85002996)	2nd St., S. 48°29′36″N 99°12′20″W	Cando	
2	Towner County Fairgrounds Pavilion		October 25, 2024 (#100010912)	900 1st Street; 48°29′41″N 99°11′53″W	Cando	

== Wells County ==
	Name on the Register	Image	Date listed	Location	City or town	Description
1	Beiseker Mansion		April 13, 1977 (#77001036)	2nd St. and Roberts Ave. 47°38′56″N 99°37′17″W	Fessenden	
2	Harvey High School		January 15, 2026 (#100012550)	811 Burke Avenue; 47°46′09″N 99°55′56″W	Harvey	A former high school, now an elementary school.
3	Harvey Power Plant		June 5, 2020 (#100005273)	SE corner of US 52 Bus. and Judy Blvd. 47°45′56″N 99°55′17″W	Harvey	
4	Hurd Round House		April 11, 1977 (#77001038)	7 miles southeast of Hurdsfield; 47°23′05″N 99°52′28″W	Hurdsfield vicinity	
5	Vang Evangelical Lutheran Church	Vang Evangelical Lutheran Church	June 21, 2001 (#01000674)	200 W. LeGrand St. 47°41′43″N 99°45′02″W	Manfred	
6	Wells County Courthouse	Wells County Courthouse	September 15, 1977 (#77001037)	Railway St., N. 47°38′56″N 99°37′29″W	Fessenden	
7	Wells County Fairgrounds		February 28, 1991 (#91000073)	Junction of U.S. Route 52 and ND 15; 47°38′38″N 99°37′26″W	Fessenden	

== Williams County ==
	Name on the Register	Image	Date listed	Location	City or town	Description
1	Creaser Building	Creaser Building	July 11, 2016 (#16000442)	224 Main St. 48°08′47″N 103°37′17″W	Williston	
2	Fort Buford State Historic Site	Fort Buford State Historic Site	April 1, 1975 (#75001308)	Southwest of Williston at the confluence of the Yellowstone and Missouri Rivers; 47°59′02″N 103°59′34″W	Williston	
3	Fort Union Trading Post National Historic Site	Fort Union Trading Post National Historic Site	October 15, 1966 (#66000103)	15550 Highway 1804; 47°59′58″N 104°02′13″W	Williston	Two boundary increases were approved May 9, 2025.
4	James Memorial Library	James Memorial Library	November 14, 1979 (#79001777)	621 1st Ave., W. 48°09′00″N 103°37′26″W	Williston	
5	Old Armory	Old Armory	April 11, 1985 (#85000787)	320 1st Ave., E. 48°08′51″N 103°37′10″W	Williston	
6	Old US Post Office	Old US Post Office	October 22, 1979 (#79003729)	322 Main Ave. 48°08′50″N 103°37′30″W	Williston	
7	Ray Opera House	Ray Opera House	November 2, 1978 (#78001997)	111 Main St. 48°20′41″N 103°10′00″W	Ray	
8	Williston High School	Williston High School	June 27, 2011 (#11000413)	612 1st Ave. W. 48°09′00″N 103°37′25″W	Williston	

== See also ==
- List of National Historic Landmarks in North Dakota
- List of bridges on the National Register of Historic Places in North Dakota
- List of historical societies in North Dakota
