= Welsh House =

Welsh House may refer to:

in the United States (by state then city)

- Welsh House (Syracuse, New York), listed on the National Register of Historic Places (NRHP) in Onondaga County
- Welsh House (Mandan, North Dakota), listed on the NRHP in Morton County
- Gillett-Shoemaker-Welsh House, Waterville, Ohio, listed on the NRHP in Lucas County
- Rafsnyder-Welsh House, Philadelphia, Pennsylvania, listed on the NRHP in Center City, Philadelphia
- Welsh-Emery House, Richeyville, Pennsylvania, listed on the NRHP in Washington County
- John Welsh House, Wyndmoor, Pennsylvania, listed on the NRHP in Montgomery County
