= Semevolos Farm =

- U.S. National Register of Historic Places
- Location within North Dakota Location within the United States
- Nearest city: Butte, North Dakota
- Coordinates: 47°49′47″N 100°36′35″W
- Area: less than one acre
- Built: 1906
- Architectural style: Ukrainian Dwelling, Other
- MPS: Ukrainian Immigrant Dwellings and Churches in North Dakota from Early Settlement Until the Depression MPS
- NRHP reference No.: 87001788
- Added to NRHP: October 16, 1987

The Semevolos Farm near Butte, North Dakota, United States, is a farm that was homesteaded by John ( Iwan ) and Rose/Rosie ( Regina Romarenko) Semevolos in 1903, and one or more of its buildings were developed in 1906. It was listed on the National Register of Historic Places in 1987.

According to its nomination, the Semevolos house is architecturally significant "as a near 'textbook' example of one of two identified Ukrainian immigrant building types." It has a blue door.

The main houses roof has caved in and everything has been boarded up.
