= Cross Ranch Archeological District =

Historic district in North Dakota, United States

- U.S. National Register of Historic Places
- U.S. Historic district
- Location within North Dakota Location within the United States
- Nearest city: Hensler, North Dakota
- Coordinates: 47°13′0″N 101°0′0″W
- Area: 6,365 acres (2,576 ha)
- NRHP reference No.: 85003484
- Added to NRHP: November 4, 1985

The Cross Ranch Archeological District near Hensler, North Dakota is a 6,365-acre (2,576 ha) historic district that was listed on the National Register of Historic Places (NRHP) in 1985. The listing included 149 contributing sites.

Among the sites in the district, Bagnell (32OL16) was seemingly occupied during the late sixteenth and early seventeenth centuries AD. Houses excavated at the site have produced significant evidence of the architectural practices of the residents: posthole patterns and other features suggest that the houses represent a transition to the earthlodges found among area tribes during the historic period.
