= Golden Valley County Courthouse =

- U.S. National Register of Historic Places
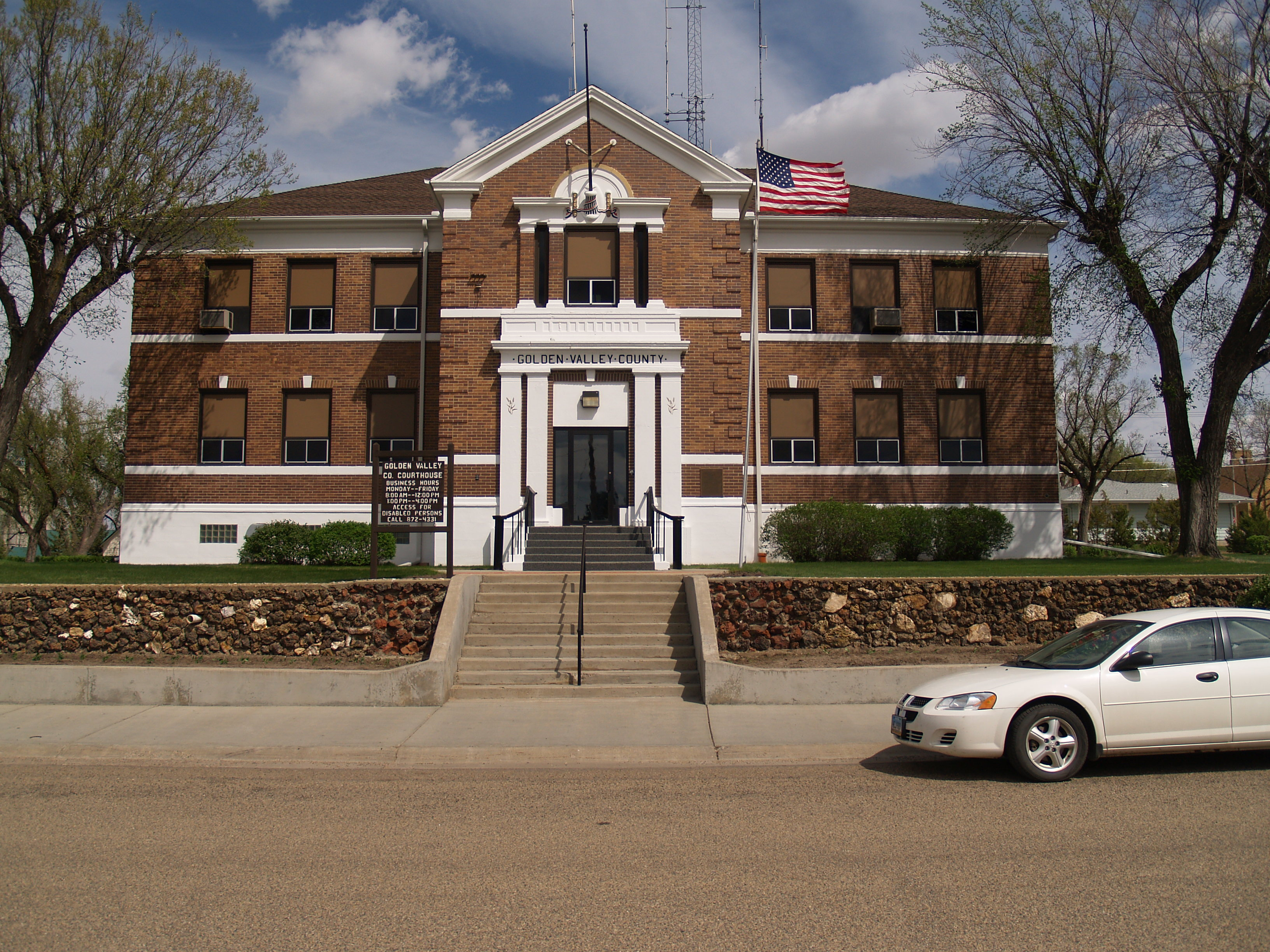

- Location within North Dakota Location within the United States
- Location: 150 First Ave. SE, Beach, North Dakota
- Coordinates: 46°54′48″N 104°0′14″W
- Area: less than one acre
- Built: 1923
- Built by: A.J. Weinberger
- Architect: W.E. Deitrich
- Architectural style: Federal Revival
- MPS: North Dakota County Courthouses TR
- NRHP reference No.: 85002983
- Added to NRHP: November 14, 1985

The Golden Valley County Courthouse is a historic courthouse in the city of Beach in Golden Valley County, North Dakota. The courthouse was built in 1923 in the Federal Revival style; it is one of two courthouses in North Dakota to have been built in this style, the other being the Logan County Courthouse. It was added to the National Register of Historic Places on November 14, 1985.
