= Hurd Round House =

Historic house in North Dakota, United States

- U.S. National Register of Historic Places
- Location within North Dakota Location within the United States
- Nearest city: Hurdsfield, North Dakota
- Coordinates: 47°23′5″N 99°52′28″W
- Area: 1 acre (0.40 ha)
- Built: 1900
- Built by: Warren Hurd
- Architect: Elgin Hurd
- Architectural style: Round-house, Other
- Restored: c. 1966
- Restored by: Wells County Historical Society
- NRHP reference No.: 77001038
- Added to NRHP: April 11, 1977

The Hurd Round House near Hurdsfield, North Dakota was built in 1900.

It was listed on the National Register of Historic Places in 1977.

It was a land office. "Round" in its name is for its circular roof; the building's walls are not round.
