= Ole Crogen Farm District =

Historic district in North Dakota, United States

- U.S. National Register of Historic Places
- U.S. Historic district
- Location within North Dakota Location within the United States
- Nearest city: Carbury & Bottineau, North Dakota
- Coordinates: 48°53′0″N 100°31′45″W
- Area: 2.8 acres (1.1 ha)
- NRHP reference No.: 87001779
- Added to NRHP: October 16, 1987

The Ole Crogen Farm District is a historic place located in Bottineau County, North Dakota. The site is situated near the Turtle Mountains, north and west of Bottineau, North Dakota. The former Ole and Ingeborg Crogen farmstead was listed on the National Register of Historic Places during 1987.

Ole Crogen was born at Sør-Fron Municipality in Oppland, Norway. He had first immigrated from the region of Gudbrandsdalen in Norway to Pope County, Minnesota in 1867 with his parents and siblings. He moved into North Dakota during 1886. The historic listing includes five contributing buildings dating from around 1902. Between 2000 and 2003, the main farmhouse was removed from the property, leaving 4 remaining buildings.
