= Ray Opera House =

- U.S. National Register of Historic Places
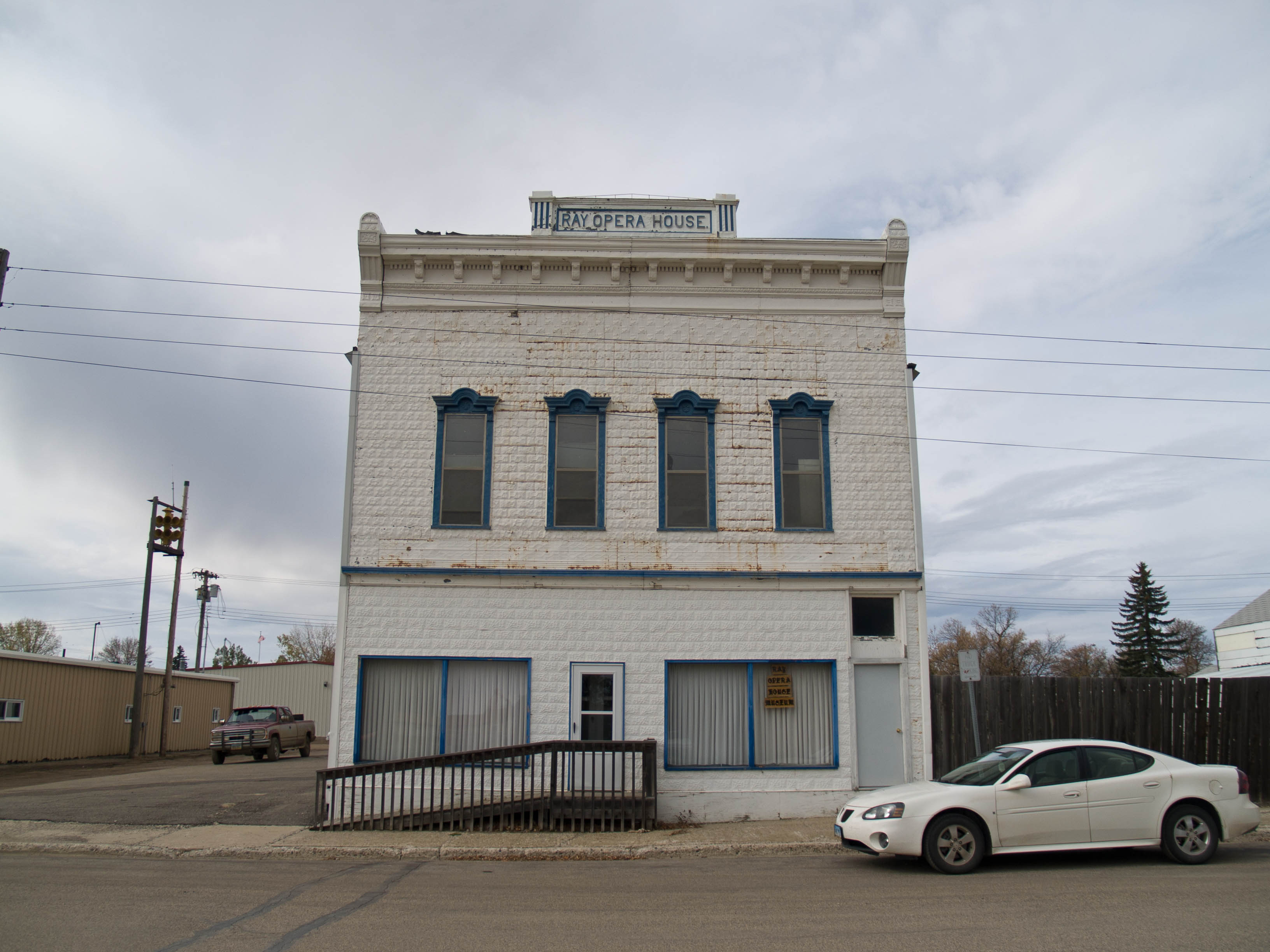
- Building in 2008

- Location within North Dakota Location within the United States
- Location: 111 Main St., Ray, North Dakota
- Coordinates: 48°20′41″N 103°10′0″W
- Area: less than one acre
- Built: 1904
- NRHP reference No.: 78001997
- Added to NRHP: November 2, 1978

Ray Opera House is on Main Street in Ray, North Dakota.

The two-story building was built in 1904. Merchant Sigbjorn Charlson established his business in the building and operated it as Charlson's Store. The second-floor of the 2-story structure comprised the opera house, while the first-floor was occupied by Charlson's grocery and general store. The building was listed on the National Register of Historic Places in 1978.
