= Walter T. Noonan House =

Historic house in North Dakota, United States

- U.S. National Register of Historic Places
- Location within North Dakota Location within the United States
- Location: 215 S. Seventh St., Current Owner: Scott Roney Oakes, North Dakota
- Coordinates: 46.13613°N 98.09104°W
- Area: less than one acre
- Built: 1924
- Architect: Dennis & Knowle
- Architectural style: Late 19th and Early 20th Century American Movements, Bungalow/Craftsman, Mediterranean
- MPS: Oakes MPS
- NRHP reference No.: 87001791
- Added to NRHP: October 16, 1987

The Walter T. Noonan House on South Seventh Street in Oakes, North Dakota, United States, was built in 1924. Known also as House of 29, it was designed by Dennis & Knowle. It was listed on the National Register of Historic Places in 1987. The listing included two contributing buildings.

According to its NRHP nomination, the house "is significant as the outstanding architecturally significant residence in Oakes. The design is unmatched in Oakes on the basis of aesthetic character."

The house was home of Walter Noonan, president of the North American Creamery Company, which became the largest employer in Oakes.

The house was for sale in 2016.

The house re-opened in 2018 as a bed and breakfast and event venue under the name NoonanHouse.com

In early 2024, the house was sold and is set to be utilized once more as a private residence for a local businessman.
