= Louis Rehm Barn =

- U.S. National Register of Historic Places
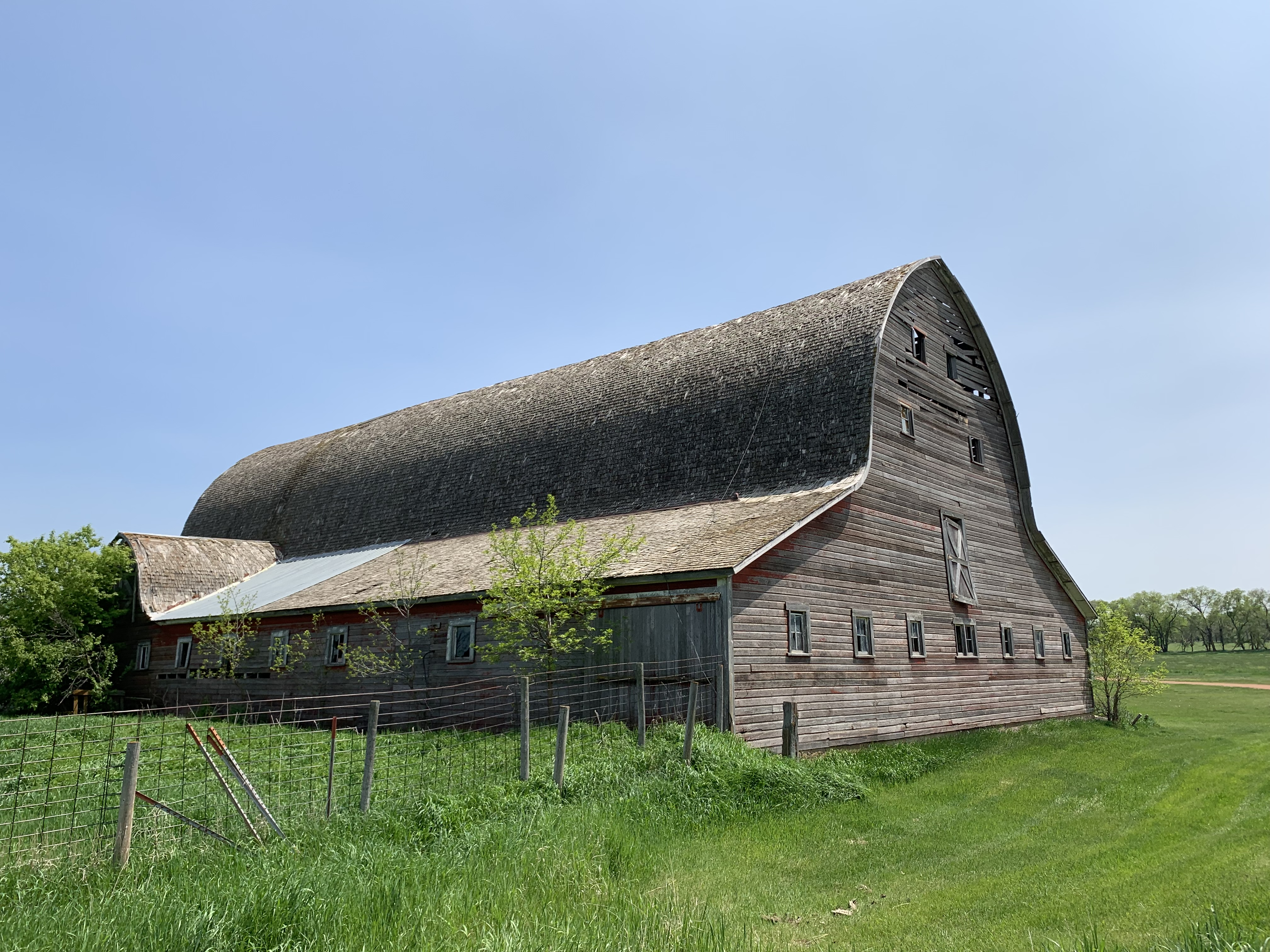
- Louis Rehm Barn, near Hebron, North Dakota.

- Location within North Dakota Location within the United States
- Nearest city: Hebron, North Dakota
- Coordinates: 46°55′36″N 102°3′48″W
- Area: less than one acre
- Built: 1917
- Built by: Adam Rehm
- Architectural style: Gothic Arch
- NRHP reference No.: 93001550
- Added to NRHP: January 31, 1994

The Louis Rehm Barn near Hebron, North Dakota, United States, was built in 1917. It was built by Adam Rehm and, in 1994 was owned by Armin Rehm. It is also known as the Armin Rehm Barn. The barn was listed on the National Register of Historic Places in 1994. Other farm buildings were of lesser significance or integrity so were not nominated.

The barn is described in its NRHP nomination as an example of an "early application of the gothic arch roof in barn design" and having a "commanding profile". It is 96 by 60 feet (29 m × 18 m) in plan including side wings that are 28 feet (8.5 m) deep. It is built with Douglas fir balloon framing and has fir drop siding.

The barn got electricity in 1918.
