= John and Fredricka (Roth) Stern Homestead =

- U.S. National Register of Historic Places
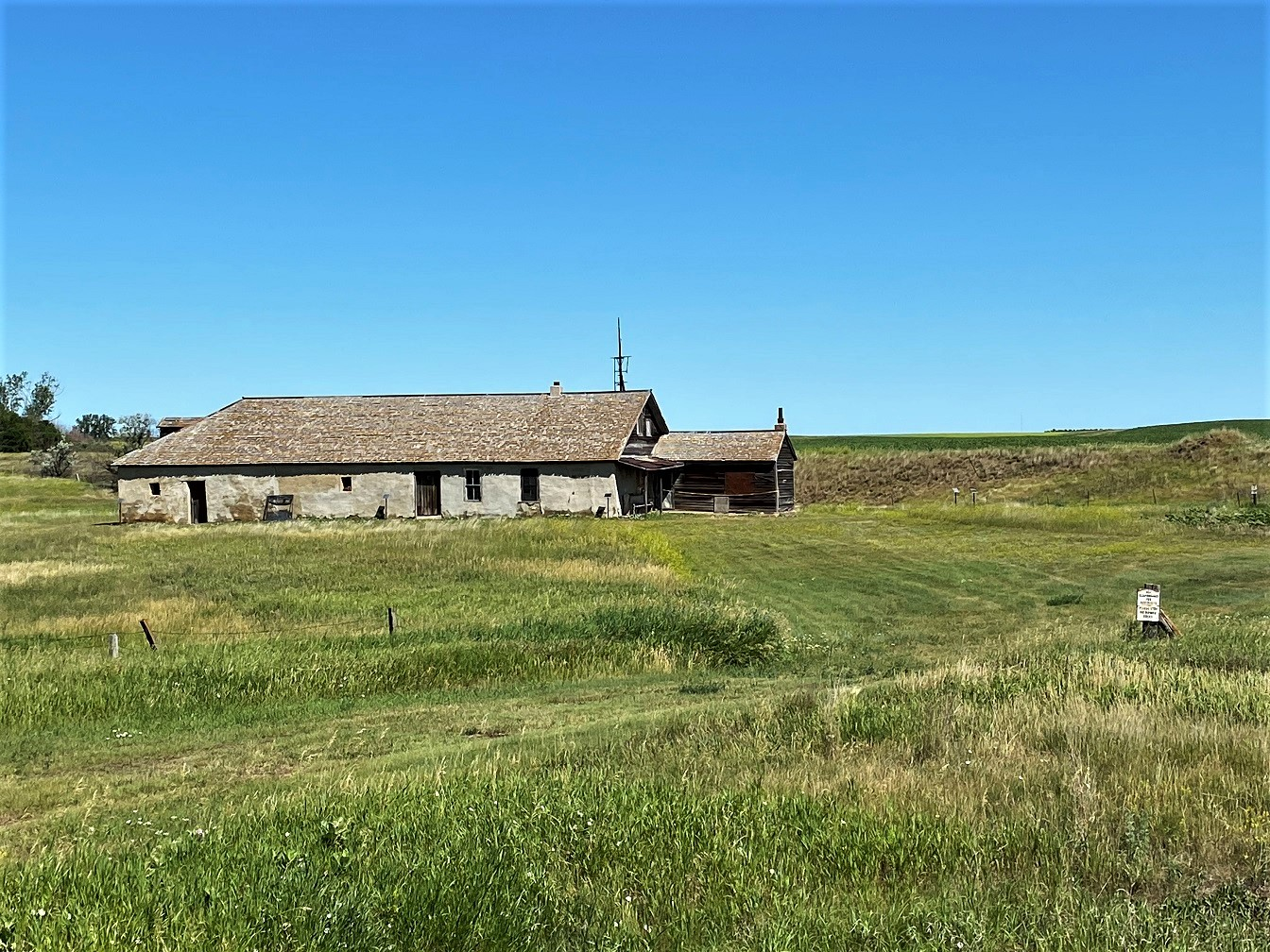

- Location within North Dakota Location within the United States
- Nearest city: Mott, North Dakota
- Coordinates: 46.37178°N 102.27455°W
- Area: 160 acres (65 ha)
- Built by: John Stern
- Architectural style: Vernacular
- NRHP reference No.: 08000902
- Added to NRHP: September 19, 2008

The John and Fredricka (Roth) Stern Homestead near Mott, North Dakota, United States, was listed on the National Register of Historic Places in 2008. The listing included two contributing buildings and one contributing object on 160 acres (65 ha).

The homestead has German-Russian homestead architecture and was built by John Stern in 1905. It is two miles east of Mott on North Dakota Highway 21. Tours of the site have been sponsored by the Mott Gallery of History and Art.
