= Thomas Nichols Putnam House =

Historic house in North Dakota, United States

- U.S. National Register of Historic Places
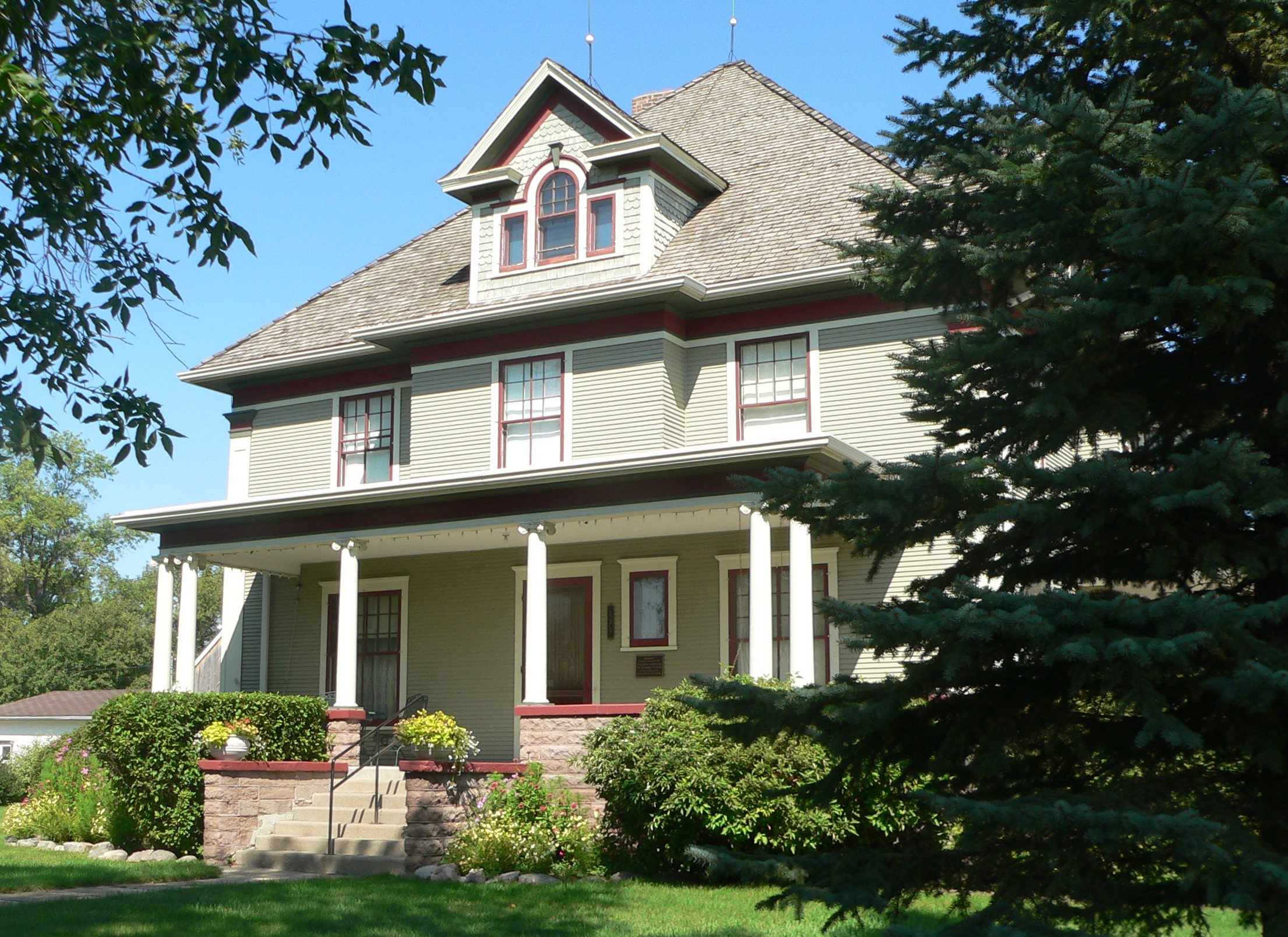

- Location within North Dakota Location within the United States
- Location: 533 Main St., Carrington, North Dakota
- Coordinates: 47.449831°N 99.119336°W
- Built: 1907
- Built by: Putnam, Thomas Nichols
- Architectural style: American Foursquare, Classical Revival, Other
- NRHP reference No.: 92001604
- Added to NRHP: November 24, 1992

The Thomas Nichols Putnam House on Main St. in Carrington, North Dakota, United States, is an American Foursquare house with Classical Revival architecture elements that was built in 1907. It was listed on the National Register of Historic Places in 1992.

The home was the former residence of Thomas Nichols Putnam (1855–1931) and his wife Clara Belle Rood Putnam (1861-1937). Thomas Nichols Putnam was an early settler of Carrington and the area's pioneer lumber man. He influenced the community's development through his lumberyard business and in many other ways. He served in the North Dakota State House of Representatives from 1910 to 1912 and the North Dakota State Senate from 1914 to 1930 .
