= H-T Ranch =

- U.S. National Register of Historic Places
- Location within North Dakota Location within the United States
- Nearest city: Amidon, North Dakota
- Coordinates: 46°29′22″N 103°31′56″W
- Area: less than one acre
- Built: 1896
- Architectural style: Bungalow/Craftsman, Cottage
- NRHP reference No.: 85001491
- Added to NRHP: July 5, 1985

H-T Ranch is a historic ranch complex 10 miles (16 km) west of Amidon, North Dakota. The ranch originally consisted of ten buildings; however, only the ranch house and log barn survive. The ranch served as the headquarters of the Little Missouri Cattle Company, which was run by Arthur Clark Hidekoper. Hidekober established the ranch in the 1880s, and by the end of the decade, it had become the "most notable" ranch in the area. The ranch house, called Shackford, was built in 1896; its uncommon style resembles a bungalow but also borrows from other styles such as the Stick style. By 1906, the Fargo Forum described the ranch as "the biggest and most important [ranch] in the state" and "one of the largest horse raising outlets in the world". In the same year, Hidekoper sold the 70,000-acre (28,000 ha) ranch; the sale was the largest land deal in North Dakota history. After the sale, a land company reduced the ranch to 5,000 acres (2,000 ha); it was later used as a dude ranch in the 1920s.

The ranch was added to the National Register of Historic Places on July 5, 1985.
