= Pierson Farm =

- U.S. National Register of Historic Places
- Location within North Dakota Location within the United States
- Nearest city: York, North Dakota
- Coordinates: 48°15′42″N 99°34′6″W
- Area: less than one acre
- Built: 1923
- Architectural style: Arts & Crafts
- NRHP reference No.: 85001939
- Added to NRHP: August 29, 1985

The Pierson Farm near York, North Dakota is a farm that was developed in 1923. The farm was owned by Olaf Pierson, a Swedish immigrant. It was listed on the National Register of Historic Places in 1985.
