= Lisbon Opera House =

- U.S. National Register of Historic Places
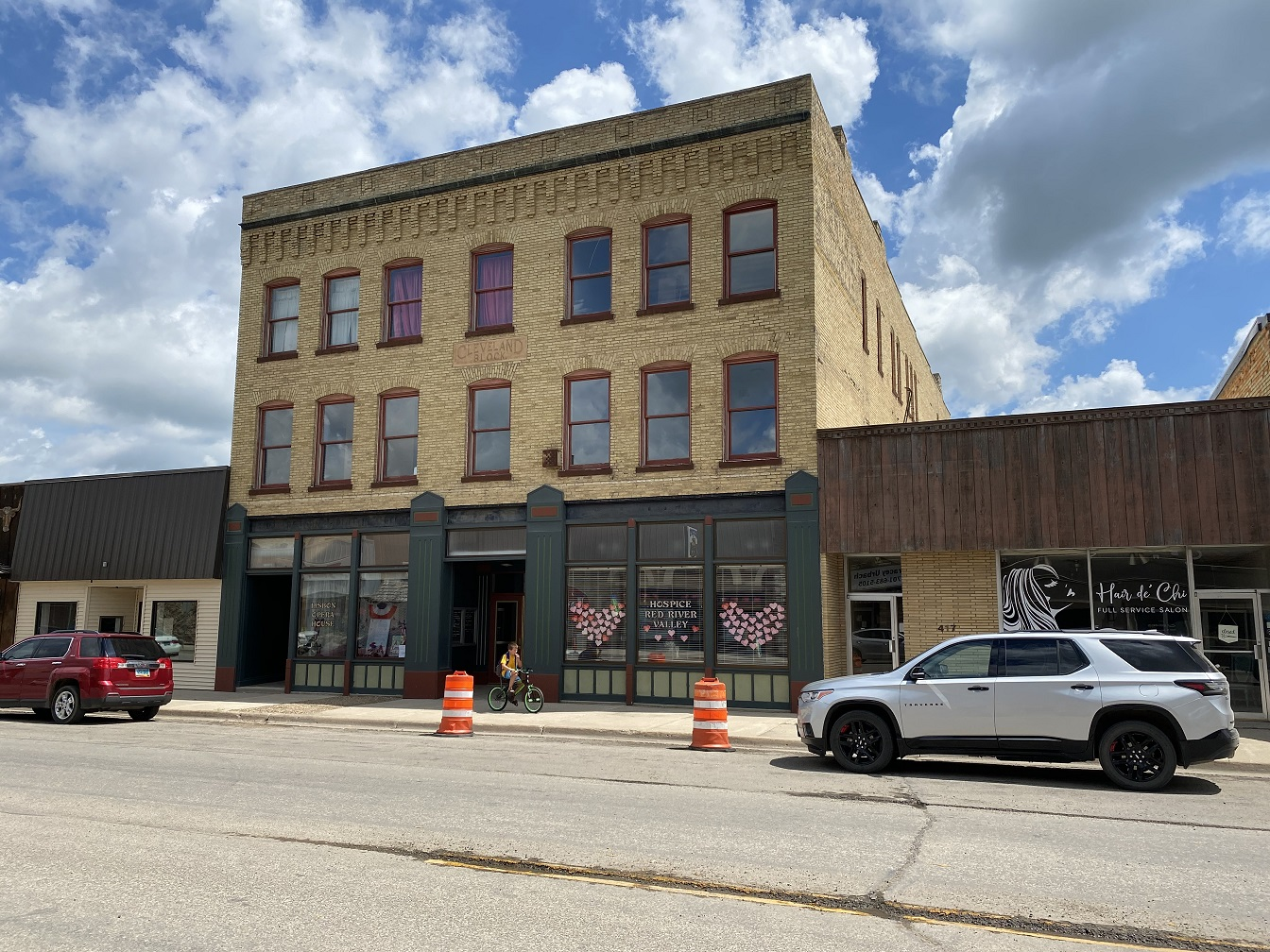

- Location within North Dakota Location within the United States
- Location: 413 Main Ave. Lisbon, North Dakota
- Coordinates: 46°26′32″N 97°40′50″W
- Area: less than one acre
- Built: 1889
- Architectural style: Northern Plains Romanesque
- NRHP reference No.: 79003727
- Added to NRHP: October 18, 1979

The Lisbon Opera House is a historic building in Lisbon, North Dakota.

The three-story building was built in 1889. The interior of the ground story was occupied by commercial space in what was known as the J.C. Penney Building. The main performance space of the building occupies the second and third floors.

It was listed on the National Register of Historic Places (NRHP) in 1979. According to its NRHP nomination, the "Lisbon Opera House is one of a few remaining prairie opera houses and was one of the largest and finest of its kind." It served as an opera house until about 1910 when it began to be used for motion picture shows, and was used for that purpose until 1922.
