= Towner County Courthouse =

Historic government building in North Dakota, United States

- U.S. National Register of Historic Places
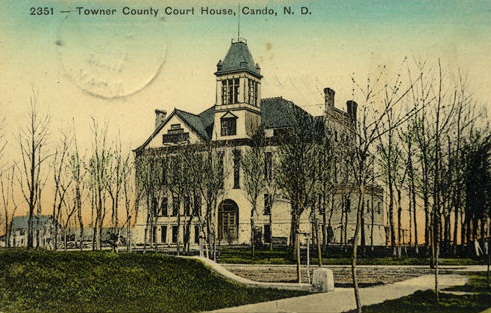
- Towner County Courthouse, c. 1912, with tower

- Location within North Dakota Location within the United States
- Interactive map showing the location of Towner County Courthouse
- Location: Second St. S, Cando, North Dakota
- Coordinates: 48°29′36″N 99°12′20″W
- Area: 2.1 acres (0.85 ha)
- Built: 1898
- Architect: O'Shea, A.J.; Fee, Watterwoth
- Architectural style: Queen Anne
- MPS: North Dakota County Courthouses TR
- NRHP reference No.: 85002996
- Added to NRHP: November 14, 1985

The Towner County Courthouse in Cando, North Dakota is a historic Queen Anne-style building that was built in 1898. It was listed on the National Register of Historic Places in 1985.

It is a four-story wheat-colored brick building upon a cut stone foundation. Queen Anne elements of its design include its irregular plan and complex roofline, including a gable where a higher tower once rose.

Also on the grounds is an old schoolhouse, which has been moved to the property.
