= Ingersoll School =

- U.S. National Register of Historic Places
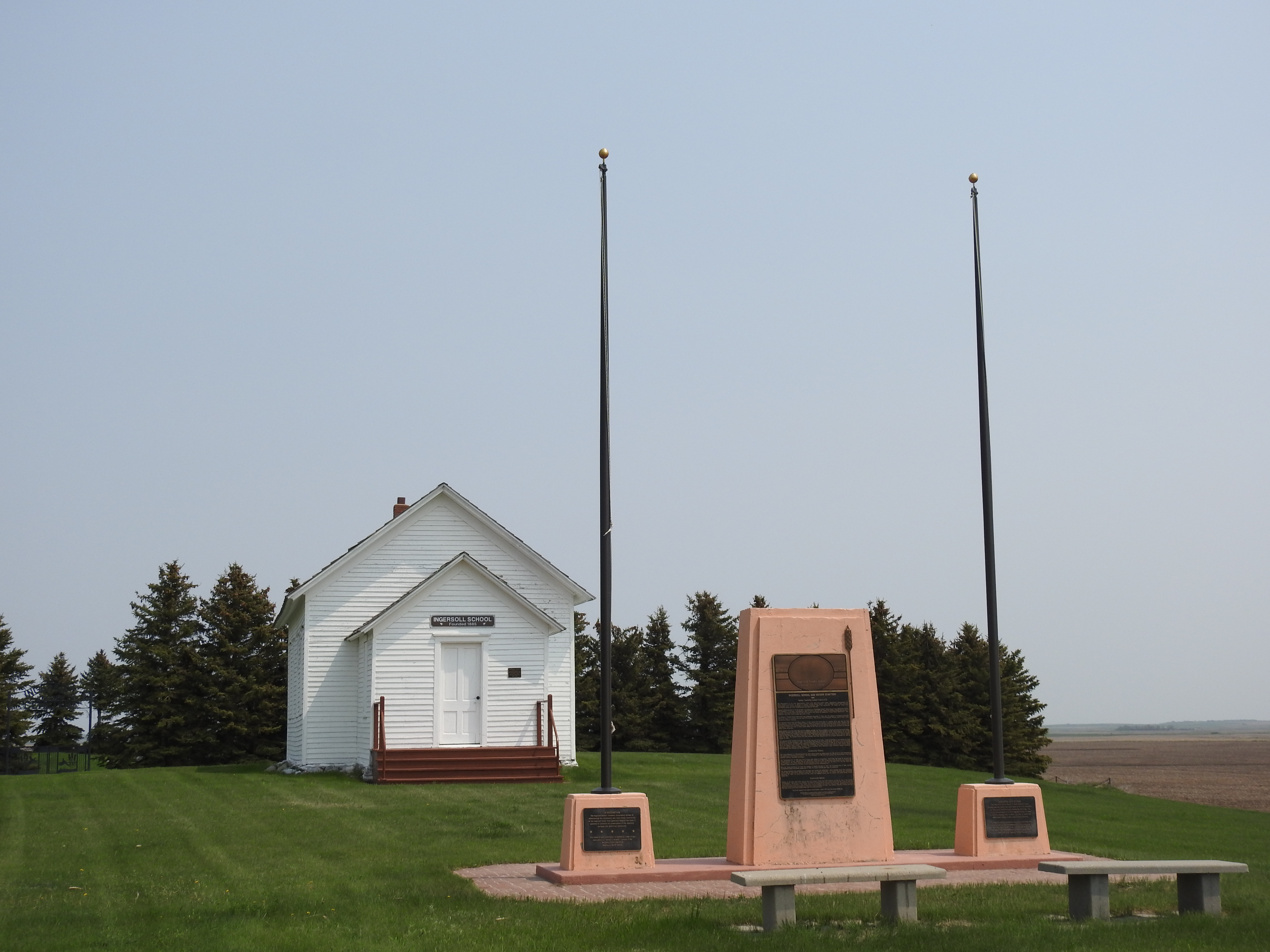
- Ingersoll School & Monument

- Location within North Dakota Location within the United States
- Nearest city: Washburn, North Dakota
- Coordinates: 47°27′05″N 100°59′32″W
- Area: 2 acres (0.81 ha)
- Built: 1885
- Built by: Anderson, Olof A.
- Architectural style: Late 19th and Early 20th Century American Movements
- NRHP reference No.: 10000139
- Added to NRHP: March 31, 2010

The Ingersoll School, a one-room schoolhouse near Washburn, North Dakota, was built in 1885. It was listed on the National Register of Historic Places in 2010.

Its 125th anniversary was celebrated in July, 2010.

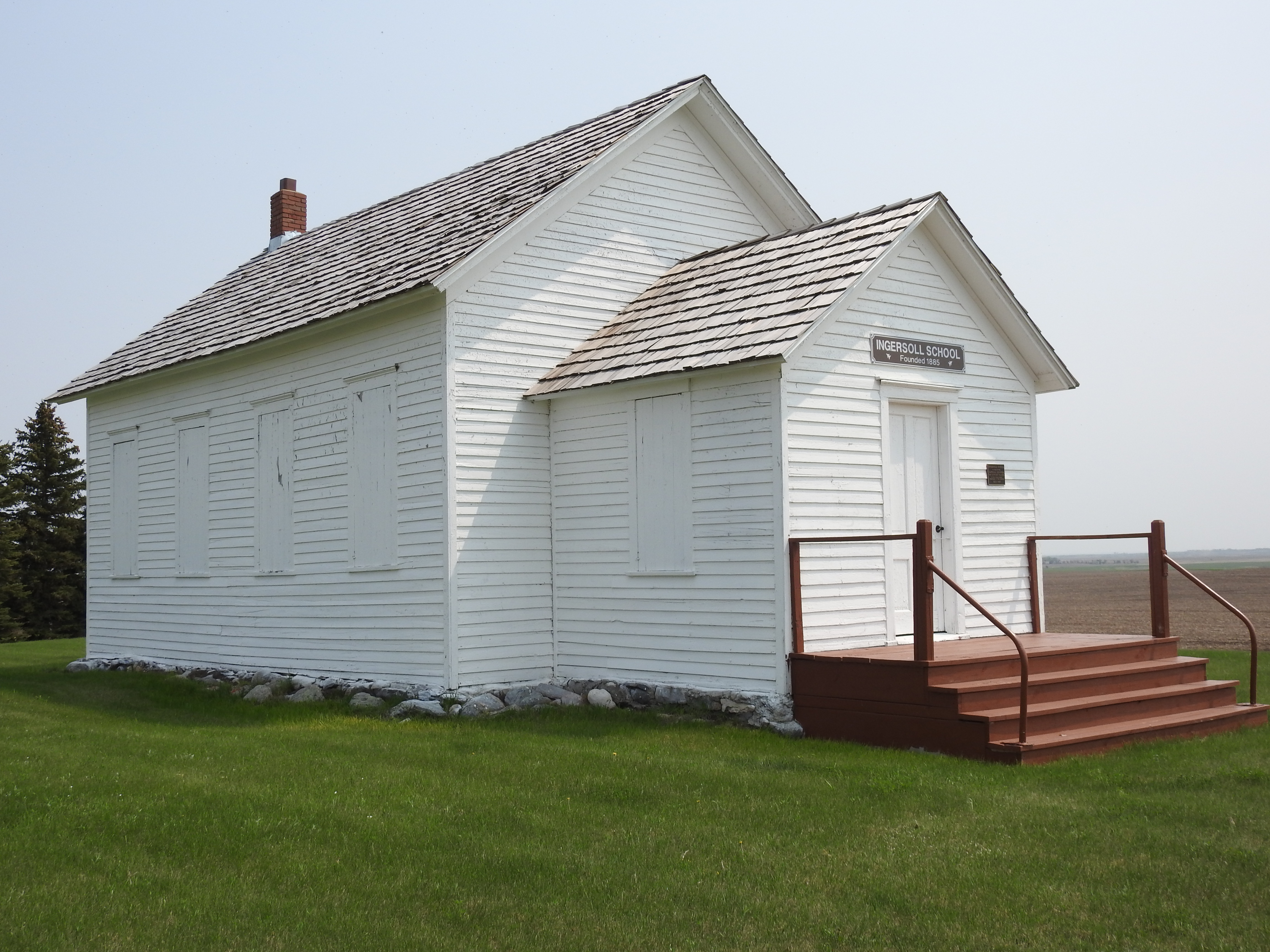
School building

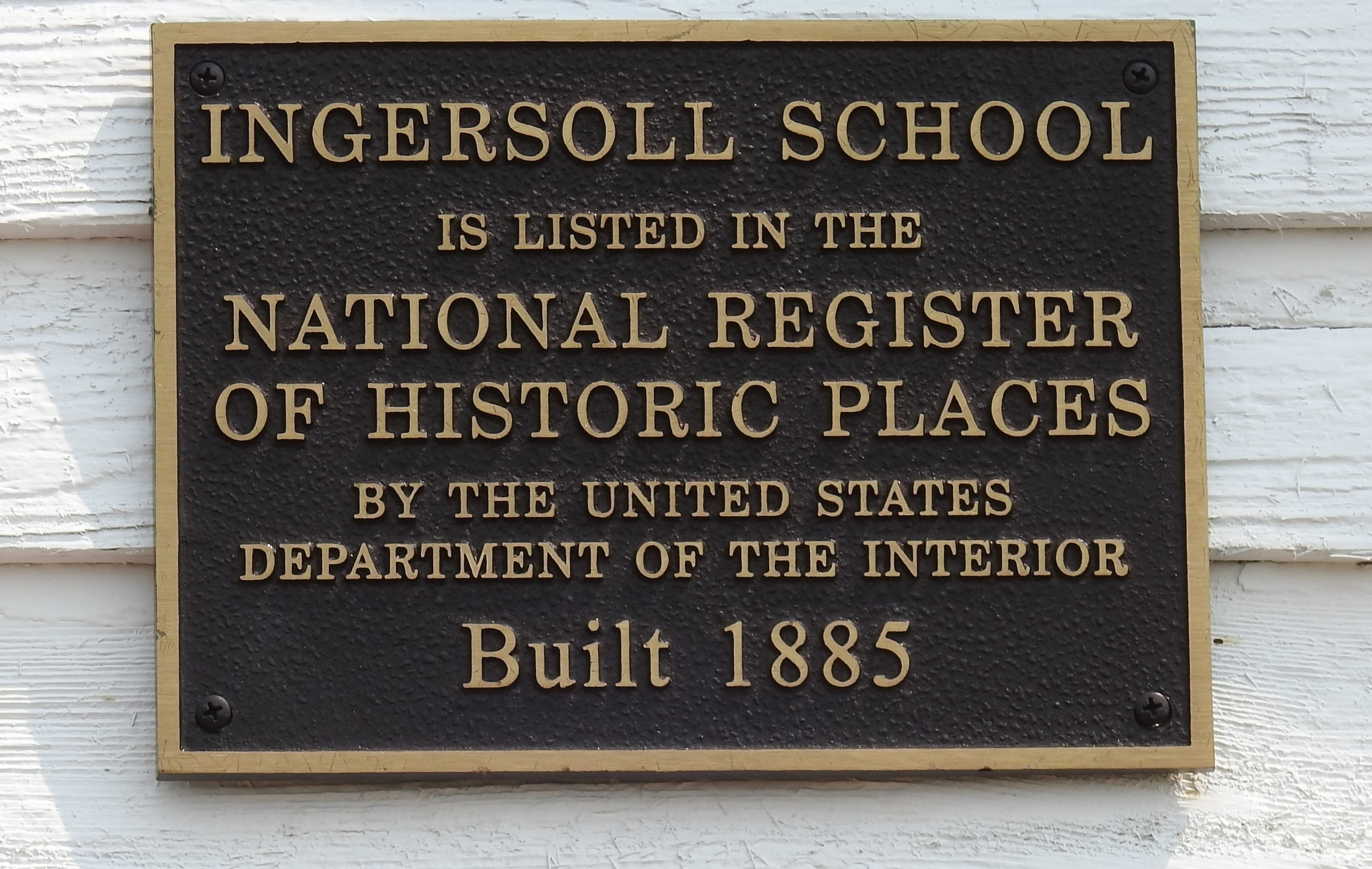
NRHP plaque

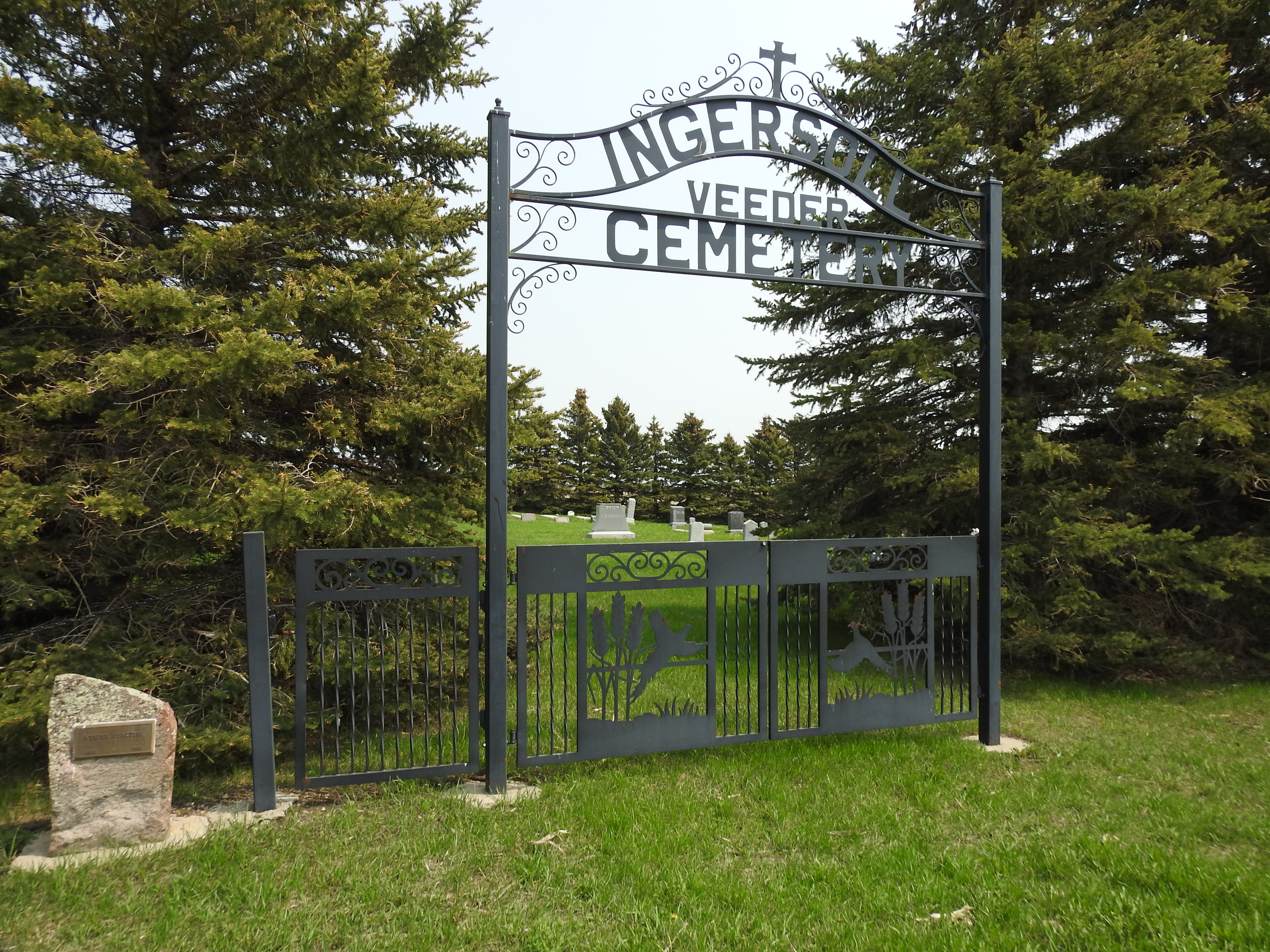
Veeder Cemetery gate behind school building
