= Swedish Zion Lutheran Church =

Historic church in North Dakota, United States

- U.S. National Register of Historic Places
- Location within North Dakota Location within the United States
- Location: 32 rods from NE. corner of SE. corner T164N, R77W, sec34, Souris, North Dakota
- Coordinates: 48°59′10.05″N 100°37′17.78″W
- Built: 1903
- NRHP reference No.: 13000138
- Added to NRHP: April 1, 2013

Swedish Zion Lutheran Church in Bottineau County, North Dakota is a historic rural church that was listed on the National Register of Historic Places in April 2013. The stone church is located near the town of Souris, just two miles from the border with Canada.

Swedish Zion Lutheran Church had its origins starting in 1896, when a group of Swedish immigrants established the church through the Augustana Synod. The stone church was built in 1903 of granite with white clapboards in Late Gothic Revival architecture. It has three-point arch windows and a wooden steeple. The church served an active congregation until 1938. No longer serving as a church, it has been maintained well.

== Other sources ==
- Wunderlick, Gene (2012) Stone Church: A Prairie Parable (CreateSpace Independent Publishing) ISBN 978-1469913087
