= Independence Congregational Church =

Historic church in North Dakota, United States

- U.S. National Register of Historic Places
- Location within North Dakota Location within the United States
- Location: BIA Rd. 13, Fort Berthold Indian Reservation, near Mandaree in Dunn County, North Dakota
- Coordinates: 47.6945°N 102.3763°W
- NRHP reference No.: 15000422
- Added to NRHP: July 14, 2015

The Independence Congregational Church on Fort Berthold Indian Reservation, near Mandaree in Dunn County, North Dakota, was listed on the National Register of Historic Places in 2015.

The church's bell was donated by the Broadway Tabernacle in New York City.

The church was a mission of the Congregational Church, with missionary Charles Hall and his wife arriving on May 9, 1876 to build a Congregational Mission.
