= St. Paul's Lutheran Church (Hazen, North Dakota) =

Historic church in North Dakota, United States

- U.S. National Register of Historic Places
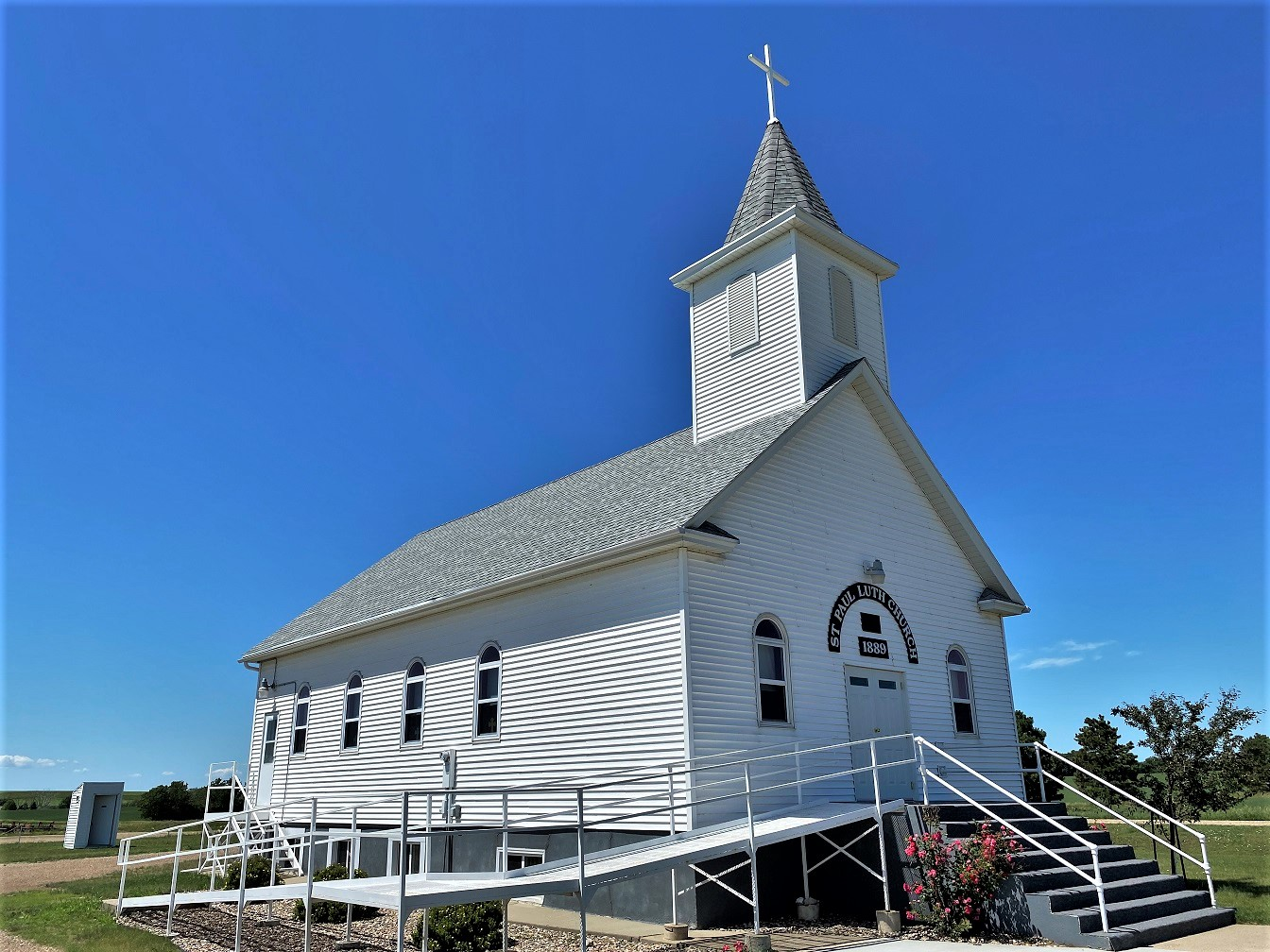

- Location within North Dakota Location within the United States
- Nearest city: Hazen, North Dakota
- Coordinates: 47°25′53″N 101°29′54″W
- Area: 4.3 acres (1.7 ha)
- Built: 1921
- Architectural style: Romanesque
- NRHP reference No.: 05000625
- Added to NRHP: June 25, 2005

The St. Paul's Lutheran Church near Hazen, North Dakota, United States, was built in 1921. It was listed on the National Register of Historic Places in 2005. The listing included one contributing building and one contributing site on 4.3 acres (1.7 ha).

The congregation formed in 1889 of German-Russian immigrants had 29 members. In 1902 they decided to build the church.
