= Burke County World War Memorial Hall =

- U.S. National Register of Historic Places
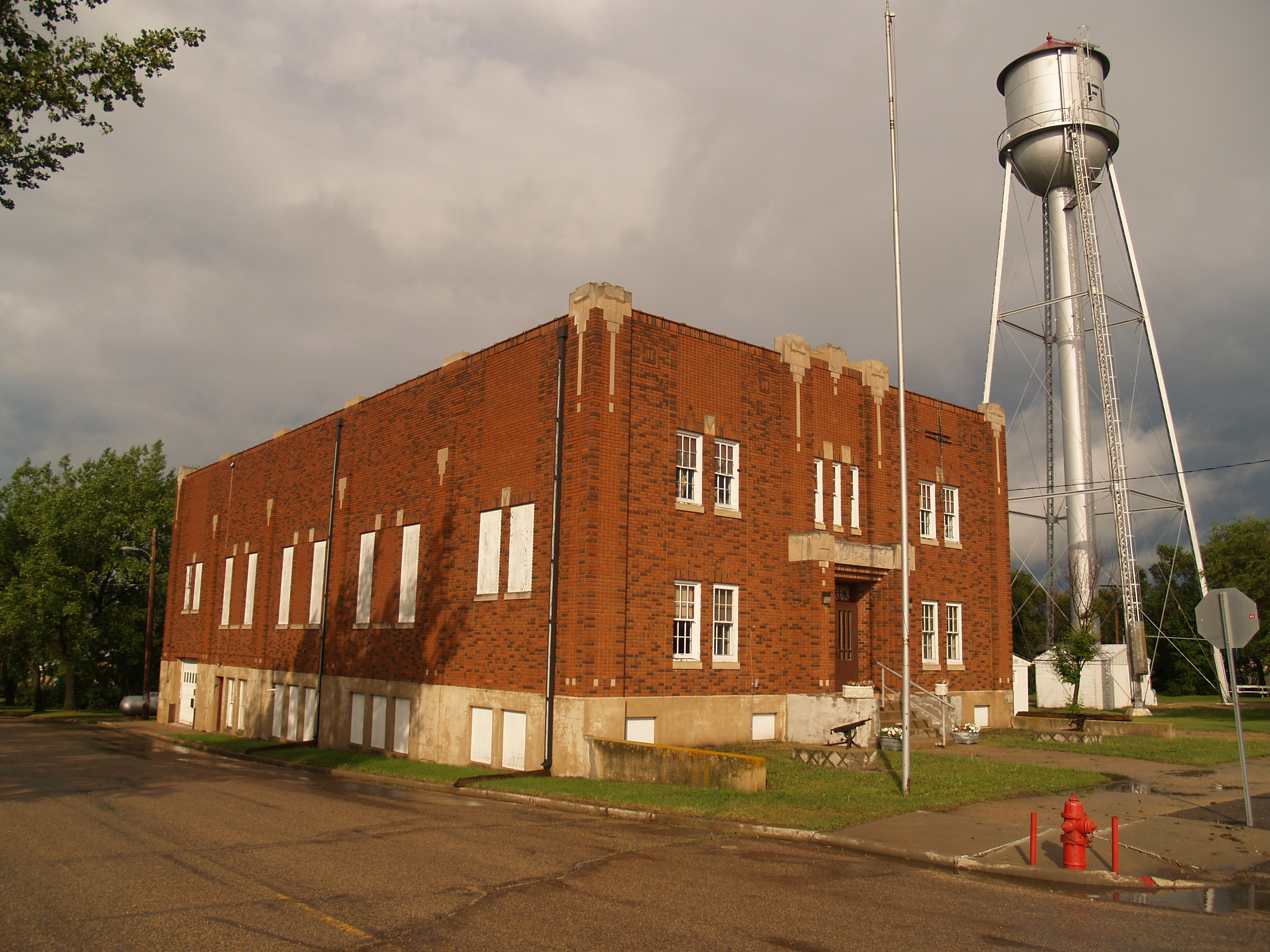

- Location within North Dakota Location within the United States
- Location: 103 1st St. E, Flaxton, North Dakota
- Coordinates: 48°53′58″N 102°23′36″W
- Area: less than one acre
- Architect: C.A. Pear
- Architectural style: Classical Revival
- NRHP reference No.: 100001952
- Added to NRHP: January 4, 2018

The Burke County World War Memorial Hall in Flaxton in Burke County, North Dakota was listed on the National Register of Historic Places in 2018.

It is also known as Flaxton Memorial Hall. It was designed by C.A. Pear.
