= Dunn County Courthouse =

Historic courthouse in North Dakota, United States

- Formerly listed on the U.S. National Register of Historic Places
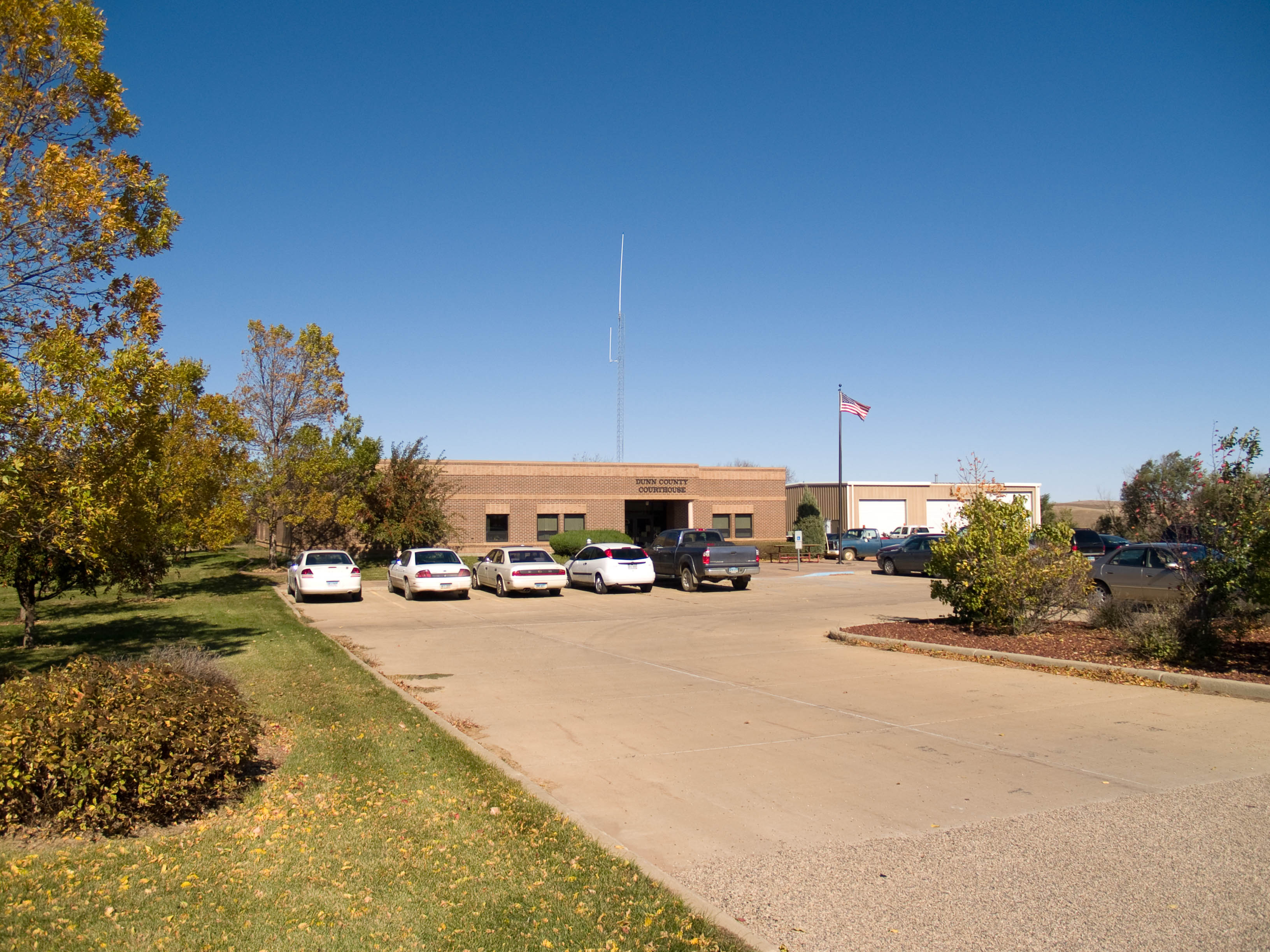
- Dunn County Courthouse - Manning North Dakota
- Location: Owens St., Manning, North Dakota
- Area: 2.1 acres (0.85 ha)
- Built: 1915
- Built by: Ree, Arnt; Davis & Son
- Demolished: 1996
- MPS: North Dakota County Courthouses TR
- NRHP reference No.: 86000620

Significant dates
- Added to NRHP: October 3, 1985
- Removed from NRHP: October 21, 2009

The Dunn County Courthouse on Owens St. in Manning, North Dakota was listed on the National Register of Historic Places. It was delisted in 2009. The listing had contained a 2.1-acre (0.85 ha) area.

In 1985, its NRHP nomination noted "a considerable integrity of feeling from the original courthouse in the appearance of the present building," which was by then no longer a courthouse.
