= Klein and Sutmar Block =

- U.S. National Register of Historic Places
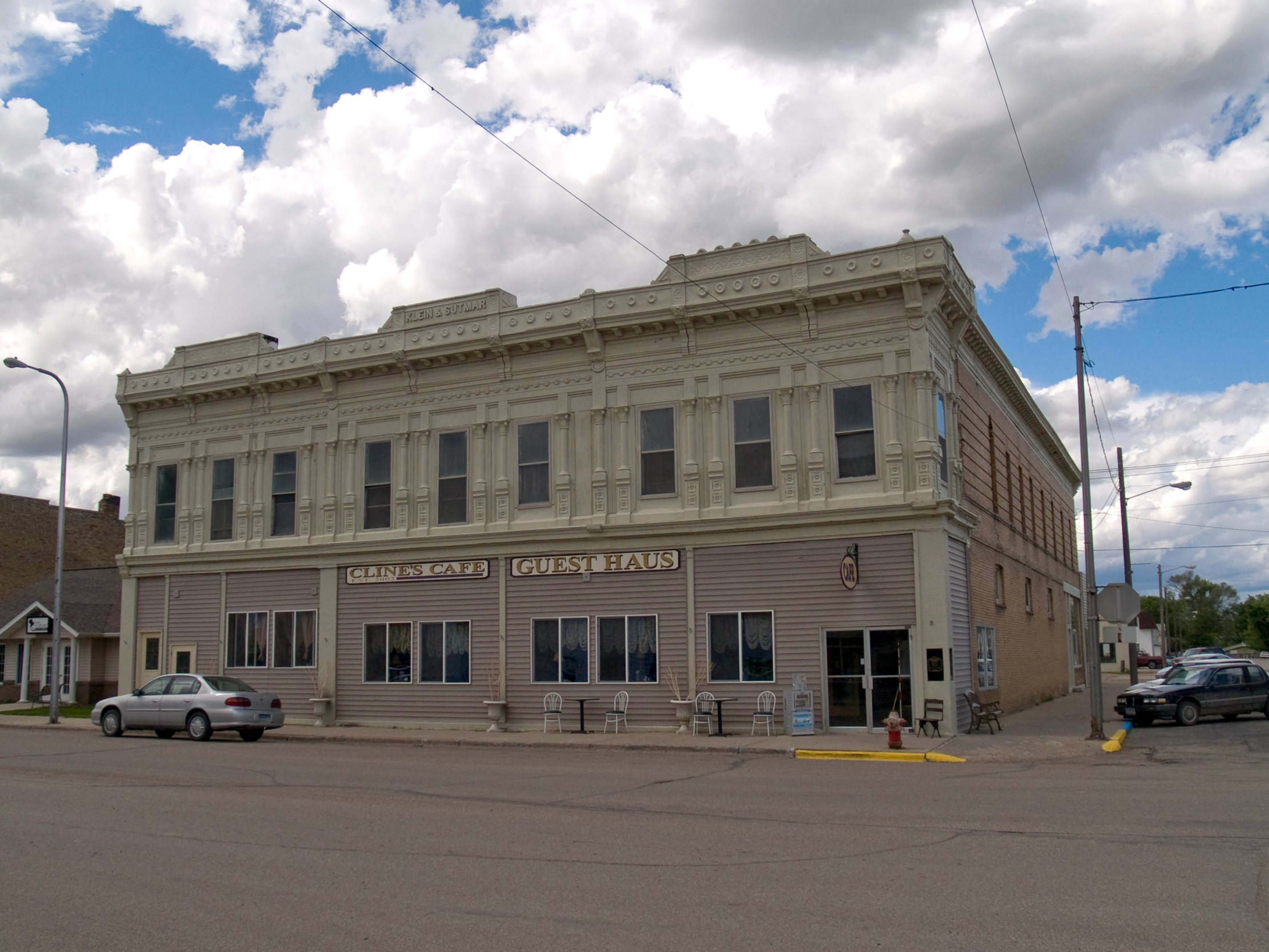

- Location within North Dakota Location within the United States
- Location: 419 Main Ave., Oakes, North Dakota
- Area: less than one acre
- Built: 1904
- Architectural style: Italianate
- MPS: Oakes MPS
- NRHP reference No.: 87001792
- Added to NRHP: October 16, 1987

The Klein and Sutmar Block on Main Avenue in Oakes, North Dakota was built in 1904. It includes Italianate architecture.

It was listed on the National Register of Historic Places in 1987.

According to its NRHP nomination, out of all of Oakes buildings, it "is the single remaining building with an ornate pressed metal facade."
