= Sunnyside Farm Barn =

- U.S. National Register of Historic Places
- Location within North Dakota Location within the United States
- Nearest city: Mandan, North Dakota
- Coordinates: 46°49′14″N 100°56′49″W
- Area: less than one acre
- Built: 1926
- Architectural style: Gambrel-roofed barn
- NRHP reference No.: 95001550
- Added to NRHP: January 19, 1996

The Sunnyside Farm Barn near Mandan, North Dakota, United States, is a barn that was built in 1926. It was listed on the National Register of Historic Places in 1996.

== History ==
Erected in 1926, the Sunnyside Farm Barn was the central focus of the North Dakota State Training School from 1926 to 1971. Hundreds of Training School inmates worked in the Sunnyside Farm Barn on a daily basis, learning skills that would equip them to be productive members of North Dakota's predominantly agricultural society after their release. In 1971, the state legislature ordered the institution to turn its farming operations over to the State Penitentiary. The Penitentiary continued to use Sunnyside Farm for nearly two more decades. Since 1989 the barn has stood empty. The building was entered into the National Register of Historic Places 1996-01-19.
