= Wrought-iron cross sites of St. John's Cemetery =

- St. John's Cemetery, Wrought-Iron Cross Site A St. John's Cemetery, Wrought-Iron Cross Site B St. John's Cemetery, Wrought-Iron Cross Site C St. John's Cemetery, Wrought-Iron Cross Site D
- U.S. National Register of Historic Places
- Location: Address restricted
- Nearest city: Zeeland, North Dakota
- Area: less than one acre
- Built: 1923 (Site C)
- Built by: Jacob Friedt (Site C)
- Architectural style: Wrought-iron cross
- MPS: German-Russian Wrought-Iron Cross Sites in Central North Dakota MPS
- NRHP reference No.: 89001687, 89001688, 89001689, 89001690
- Added to NRHP: October 23, 1989

Four historic sites within the St. John's Catholic Cemetery near Zeeland, North Dakota, United States, identified as St. John's Cemetery, Wrought-Iron Cross Site A, St. John's Cemetery, Wrought-Iron Cross Site B, Site C, and Site D, were listed on the National Register of Historic Places in 1989. They include wrought-iron crosses. The listing for Site A included 9 contributing objects; Site B included 6; Site C included just one; Site D included 9. Site C included an iron cross built in 1923 by Jacob Friedt.

Jacob Friedt, of Zeeland, was one of a number of "German-Russian blacksmiths in central North Dakota" who developed individual styles in their crosses and whose "work was known for miles around them."
