= Northern Lights Masonic Lodge =

- U.S. National Register of Historic Places
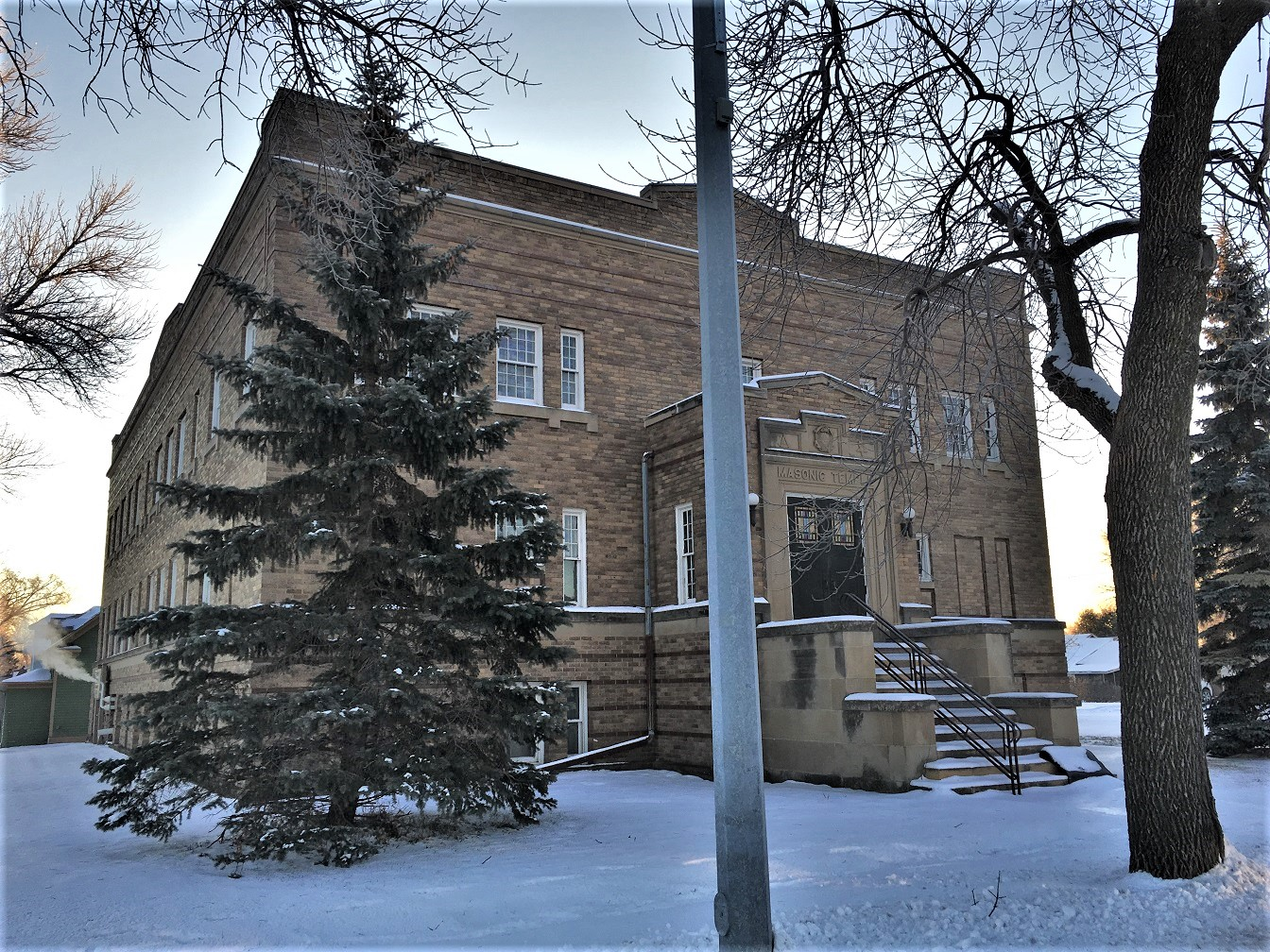

- Location within North Dakota Location within the United States
- Location: Ninth St. Cooperstown, North Dakota
- Coordinates: 47°26′36″N 98°7′23″W
- Area: less than one acre
- Built: 1916
- Built by: Reed, MacDonald, & Brewster
- Architect: Keck, Burton
- Architectural style: Craftsman
- NRHP reference No.: 87001775
- Added to NRHP: October 16, 1987

The Northern Lights Masonic Lodge in Cooperstown, North Dakota is a building from 1916. It was listed on the National Register of Historic Places in 1987.

It was deemed "significant in the context of local architecture prior to 1937. It possesses an outstanding collection of stylistic elements which typify the Craftsman style. In addition, the level of its interior and exterior integrity matches the quality of its stylistic expression."
