= Oakes National Bank Block =

- U.S. National Register of Historic Places
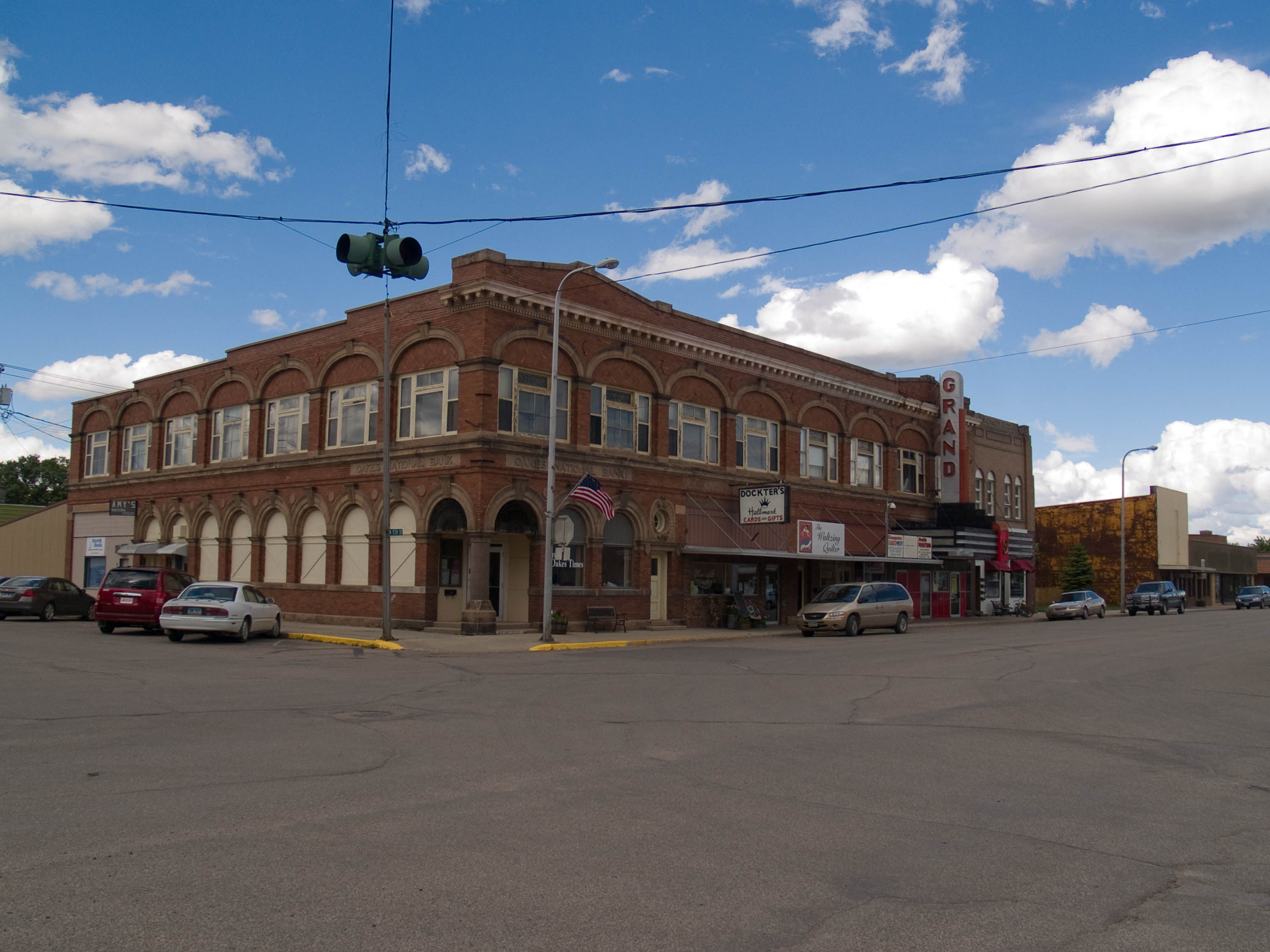

- Location within North Dakota Location within the United States
- Interactive map of Oakes National Bank Block
- Location: 501 Main Ave., Oakes, North Dakota
- Area: less than one acre
- Built: 1908
- Architect: Hafsos, R.K.
- Architectural style: Romanesque
- MPS: Oakes MPS
- NRHP reference No.: 87001790
- Added to NRHP: October 16, 1987

The Oakes National Bank Block on Main Avenue in Oakes, North Dakota was built in 1908. It was listed on the National Register of Historic Places in 1987. Its listing on the National Register was based on the structure's outstanding quality of design and its contribution to the city's commercial development.

== Location ==
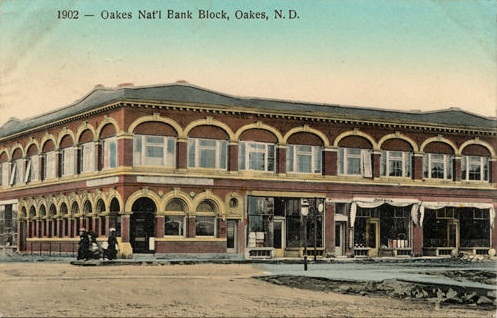
The bank block in 1902

The site is located in Oakes' central business district with retail businesses on the ground floor and office/residential space on the second floor.
