= Butte, North Dakota =

- City
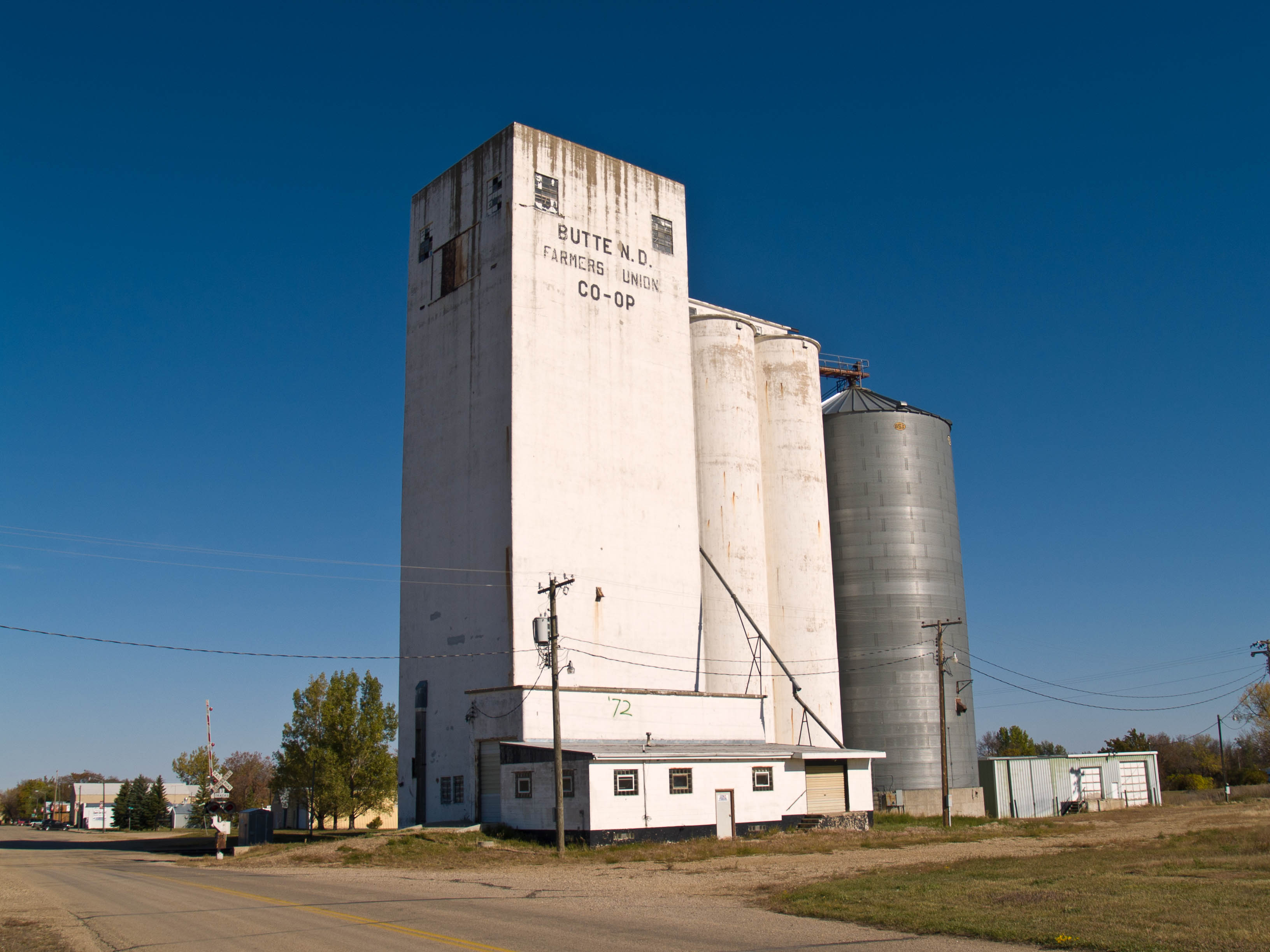
- Grain Elevator in Butte

- Location of Butte, North Dakota
- Coordinates: 47°50′13″N 100°39′57″W
- Country: United States
- State: North Dakota
- County: McLean
- Founded: 1906

Area
  - Total: 0.25 sq mi (0.64 km^{2})
  - Land: 0.25 sq mi (0.64 km^{2})
  - Water: 0 sq mi (0.00 km^{2})
- Elevation: 1,742 ft (531 m)

Population (2020)
  - Total: 70
  - Estimate (2022): 67
  - Density: 284.9/sq mi (109.99/km^{2})
- Time zone: UTC-6 (Central (CST))
  - Summer (DST): UTC-5 (CDT)
- ZIP code: 58723
- Area code: 701
- FIPS code: 38-11180
- GNIS feature ID: 1035948

Butte is a city in McLean County, North Dakota, United States. The population was 70 at the 2020 census. Butte was founded in 1906.

== Geography ==
According to the United States Census Bureau, the city has a total area of 0.25 square miles (0.65 km^{2}), all land.

== Demographics ==
Historical population
Census	Pop.	Note	%±
1910	320		—
1920	252		−21.2%
1930	231		−8.3%
1940	261		13.0%
1950	272		4.2%
1960	257		−5.5%
1970	193		−24.9%
1980	157		−18.7%
1990	129		−17.8%
2000	92		−28.7%
2010	68		−26.1%
2020	70		2.9%
2022 (est.)	67		−4.3%
U.S. Decennial Census; 2020 Census

=== 2010 census ===
As of the census of 2010, there were 68 people, 40 households, and 17 families residing in the city. The population density was 272.0 inhabitants per square mile (105.0/km^{2}). There were 84 housing units at an average density of 336.0 per square mile (129.7/km^{2}). The racial makeup of the city was 100.0% White.

There were 40 households, of which 7.5% had children under the age of 18 living with them, 42.5% were married couples living together, and 57.5% were non-families. 55.0% of all households were made up of individuals, and 25% had someone living alone who was 65 years of age or older. The average household size was 1.70 and the average family size was 2.59.

The median age in the city was 60.3 years. 10.3% of residents were under the age of 18; 2.8% were between the ages of 18 and 24; 17.7% were from 25 to 44; 32.3% were from 45 to 64; and 36.8% were 65 years of age or older. The gender makeup of the city was 55.9% male and 44.1% female.

=== 2000 census ===
As of the census of 2000, there were 92 people, 50 households, and 25 families residing in the city. The population density was 366.7 inhabitants per square mile (141.6/km^{2}). There were 82 housing units at an average density of 326.8 per square mile (126.2/km^{2}). The racial makeup of the city was 98.91% White and 1.09% African American, as now the town had one black resident, one more than as of the prior census.

There were 50 households, out of which 22.0% had children under the age of 18 living with them, 46.0% were married couples living together, and 50.0% were non-families. 48.0% of all households were made up of individuals, and 32.0% had someone living alone who was 65 years of age or older. The average household size was 1.84 and the average family size was 2.60.

In the city, the population was spread out, with 16.3% under the age of 18, 4.3% from 18 to 24, 23.9% from 25 to 44, 22.8% from 45 to 64, and 32.6% who were 65 years of age or older. The median age was 49 years. For every 100 females, there were 114.0 males. For every 100 females age 18 and over, there were 126.5 males.

The median income for a household in the city was $21,250, and the median income for a family was $29,688. Males had a median income of $29,375 versus $15,938 for females. The per capita income for the city was $15,826. There were 7.4% of families and 13.7% of the population living below the poverty line, including no under eighteens and 23.1% of those over 64.

== Education ==
It is within the Velva Public School District 1.
