= Logan County Courthouse (North Dakota) =

Historic courthouse in North Dakota, United States

- U.S. National Register of Historic Places
- Location within North Dakota Location within the United States
- Location: 301 Broadway, Napoleon, North Dakota
- Coordinates: 46°30′12″N 99°46′6″W
- Area: less than one acre
- Built: 1921, 1924
- Built by: E.A. Moline
- Architect: Van Horn & Ritterbush Brothers
- Architectural style: Federalist Revival
- MPS: North Dakota County Courthouses TR
- NRHP reference No.: 85002986
- Added to NRHP: November 14, 1985

The Logan County Courthouse in Napoleon, North Dakota was built in 1921 and extended in 1924. It was listed on the National Register of Historic Places in 1985.
