= Welsh House (Mandan, North Dakota) =

Historic house in North Dakota, United States

- U.S. National Register of Historic Places
- Location within North Dakota Location within the United States
- Location: 208 5th Ave., NW, Mandan, North Dakota
- Coordinates: 46°49′38″N 100°53′49″W
- Area: less than one acre
- Built: 1918
- NRHP reference No.: 80002921
- Added to NRHP: April 22, 1980

The Welsh House on 5th Ave., NW, in Mandan, North Dakota was built in 1918. It has also been known as Ness House. It was listed on the National Register of Historic Places in 1980.

It is a working-class home that was built by Robert M. Welsh, "a brakeman and conductor for the Northern Pacific Railroad from 1896 to 1938."
