= Hensler, North Dakota =

- Unincorporated community
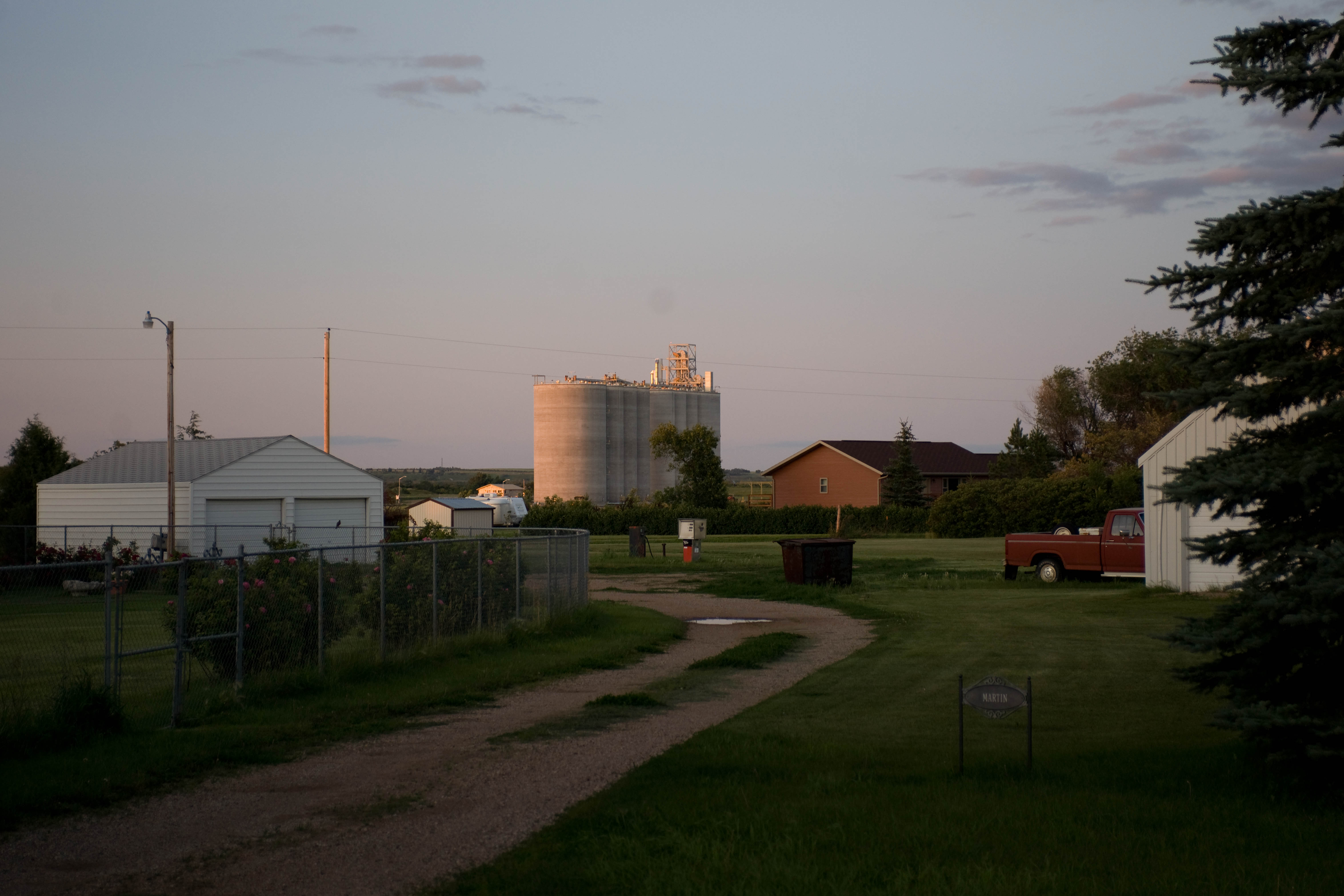
- Hensler at dusk, 2009

- Location within North Dakota Location within the United States
- Coordinates: 47°15′37″N 101°05′06″W
- Country: United States
- State: North Dakota
- County: Oliver
- Elevation: 1,713 ft (522 m)
- Time zone: UTC-6 (Central (CST))
  - Summer (DST): UTC-5 (CDT)
- Area code: 701
- GNIS feature ID: 1029403

Hensler is an unincorporated rural village in Oliver County, North Dakota, United States, located along the BNSF railroad tracks near North Dakota Highway 200 Alternate, 3.3 miles (5.3 km) southwest of Washburn. The village offers a county social services office and a grain elevator.

== Climate ==
This climatic region is typified by large seasonal temperature differences, with warm to hot (and often humid) summers and cold (sometimes severely cold) winters. According to the Köppen Climate Classification system, Hensler has a humid continental climate, abbreviated "Dfb" on climate maps.
