= Hurdsfield, North Dakota =

Hurdsfield
- City
- Location of Hurdsfield, North Dakota
- Coordinates: 47°26′48″N 99°55′52″W
- Country: United States
- State: North Dakota
- County: Wells
- Founded: 1903

Area
  - Total: 0.29 sq mi (0.75 km^{2})
  - Land: 0.29 sq mi (0.75 km^{2})
  - Water: 0 sq mi (0.00 km^{2})
- Elevation: 1,926 ft (587 m)

Population (2020)
  - Total: 64
  - Estimate (2022): 61
  - Density: 220.8/sq mi (85.26/km^{2})
- Time zone: UTC-6 (Central (CST))
  - Summer (DST): UTC-5 (CDT)
- ZIP code: 58451
- Area code: 701
- FIPS code: 38-39580
- GNIS feature ID: 1036098
- Website: www.hurdsfieldnd.com

Hurdsfield is a city in Wells County, North Dakota, United States. The population was 64 at the 2020 census. Hurdsfield was founded in 1903.

== Geography ==
According to the United States Census Bureau, the city has a total area of 0.27 square miles (0.70 km^{2}), all land.

== Demographics ==
Historical population
Census	Pop.	Note	%±
1930	220		—
1940	258		17.3%
1950	223		−13.6%
1960	183		−17.9%
1970	139		−24.0%
1980	113		−18.7%
1990	92		−18.6%
2000	91		−1.1%
2010	84		−7.7%
2020	64		−23.8%
2022 (est.)	61		−4.7%
U.S. Decennial Census; 2020 Census

=== 2010 census ===
As of the census of 2010, there were 84 people, 44 households, and 24 families residing in the city. The population density was 311.1 inhabitants per square mile (120.1/km^{2}). There were 61 housing units at an average density of 225.9 per square mile (87.2/km^{2}). The racial makeup of the city was 100.0% White.

There were 44 households, of which 15.9% had children under the age of 18 living with them, 45.5% were married couples living together, 6.8% had a female householder with no husband present, 2.3% had a male householder with no wife present, and 45.5% were non-families. 45.5% of all households were made up of individuals, and 20.5% had someone living alone who was 65 years of age or older. The average household size was 1.91 and the average family size was 2.67.

The median age in the city was 51.2 years. 15.5% of residents were under the age of 18; 6% were between the ages of 18 and 24; 16.8% were from 25 to 44; 28.6% were from 45 to 64; and 33.3% were 65 years of age or older. The gender makeup of the city was 40.5% male and 59.5% female.

=== 2000 census ===
As of the census of 2000, there were 91 people, 43 households, and 27 families residing in the city. The population density was 318.5 inhabitants per square mile (123.0/km^{2}). There were 65 housing units at an average density of 227.5 per square mile (87.8/km^{2}). The racial makeup of the city was 100.00% White.

There were 43 households, out of which 23.3% had children under the age of 18 living with them, 53.5% were married couples living together, 11.6% had a female householder with no husband present, and 34.9% were non-families. 30.2% of all households were made up of individuals, and 27.9% had someone living alone who was 65 years of age or older. The average household size was 2.12 and the average family size was 2.64.

In the city, the population was spread out, with 19.8% under the age of 18, 4.4% from 18 to 24, 22.0% from 25 to 44, 15.4% from 45 to 64, and 38.5% who were 65 years of age or older. The median age was 55 years. For every 100 females, there were 75.0 males. For every 100 females age 18 and over, there were 73.8 males.

The median income for a household in the city was $15,625, and the median income for a family was $28,125. Males had a median income of $22,500 versus $21,250 for females. The per capita income for the city was $11,208. There were 8.3% of families and 6.3% of the population living below the poverty line, including no under eighteens and 13.9% of those over 64.

== Climate ==
This climatic region is typified by large seasonal temperature differences, with warm to hot (and often humid) summers and cold (sometimes severely cold) winters. According to the Köppen Climate Classification system, Hurdsfield has a humid continental climate, abbreviated "Dfb" on climate maps.
