= National Register of Historic Places listings in Emmons County, North Dakota =

Location of Emmons County in North Dakota

This is a list of the National Register of Historic Places listings in Emmons County, North Dakota.

This is intended to be a complete list of the properties and districts on the National Register of Historic Places in Emmons County, North Dakota, United States. The locations of National Register properties and districts for which the latitude and longitude coordinates are included below, may be seen in a map.

There are 17 properties and districts listed on the National Register in the county, and one former listing.

Contents: Counties in North Dakota
Adams | Barnes | Benson | Billings | Bottineau | Bowman | Burke | Burleigh | Cass | Cavalier | Dickey | Divide | Dunn | Eddy | Emmons | Foster | Golden Valley | Grand Forks | Grant | Griggs | Hettinger | Kidder | LaMoure | Logan | McHenry | McIntosh | McKenzie | McLean | Mercer | Morton | Mountrail | Nelson | Oliver | Pembina | Pierce | Ramsey | Ransom | Renville | Richland | Rolette | Sargent | Sheridan | Sioux | Slope | Stark | Steele | Stutsman | Towner | Traill | Walsh | Ward | Wells | Williams

This National Park Service list is complete through NPS recent listings posted March 14, 2025.

== Current listings ==
	Name on the Register	Image	Date listed	Location	City or town	Description
1	Emmons County Courthouse	Emmons County Courthouse	November 14, 1985 (#85002982)	5th St. 46°16′01″N 100°14′11″W	Linton	
2	Holy Trinity Cemetery, Wrought-Iron Cross Site A	Holy Trinity Cemetery, Wrought-Iron Cross Site A	October 23, 1989 (#89001692)	Address Restricted	Strasburg	
3	Holy Trinity Cemetery, Wrought-Iron Cross Site B	Holy Trinity Cemetery, Wrought-Iron Cross Site B	October 23, 1989 (#89001693)	Address Restricted	Strasburg	
4	Holy Trinity Cemetery, Wrought-Iron Cross Site C	Holy Trinity Cemetery, Wrought-Iron Cross Site C	October 23, 1989 (#89001694)	Address Restricted	Strasburg	
5	Holy Trinity Cemetery, Wrought-Iron Cross Site D	Holy Trinity Cemetery, Wrought-Iron Cross Site D	October 23, 1989 (#89001695)	Address Restricted	Strasburg	
6	Old St. Mary's Cemetery, Wrought-Iron Cross Site	Old St. Mary's Cemetery, Wrought-Iron Cross Site	October 23, 1989 (#89001679)	Address Restricted	Hague	
7	Sacred Heart Cemetery, Wrought-Iron Cross Site	Sacred Heart Cemetery, Wrought-Iron Cross Site	October 23, 1989 (#89001691)	Address Restricted	Linton	
8	Saints Peter and Paul Catholic Church Complex	Saints Peter and Paul Catholic Church Complex	September 25, 1986 (#86002786)	1st Ave. 46°08′10″N 100°09′42″W	Strasburg	
9	St. Aloysius Cemetery, Wrought-Iron Cross Site A	St. Aloysius Cemetery, Wrought-Iron Cross Site A	October 23, 1989 (#89001696)	Address Restricted	Hague	
10	St. Aloysius Cemetery, Wrought-Iron Cross Site B	St. Aloysius Cemetery, Wrought-Iron Cross Site B	October 23, 1989 (#89001697)	Address Restricted	Hague	
11	St. Mary's Cemetery, Wrought-Iron Cross Site A	St. Mary's Cemetery, Wrought-Iron Cross Site A	October 23, 1989 (#89001676)	Address Restricted	Hague	
12	St. Mary's Cemetery, Wrought-Iron Cross Site B	St. Mary's Cemetery, Wrought-Iron Cross Site B	October 23, 1989 (#89001677)	Address Restricted	Hague	
13	St. Mary's Cemetery, Wrought-Iron Cross Site C	St. Mary's Cemetery, Wrought-Iron Cross Site C	October 23, 1989 (#89001678)	Address Restricted	Hague	
14	St. Mary's Church Non-Contiguous Historic District	St. Mary's Church Non-Contiguous Historic District	October 13, 1983 (#83004066)	Off ND 11; 46°01′41″N 100°01′01″W	Hague	
15	Tirsbol Cemetery, Wrought-Iron Cross Site	Tirsbol Cemetery, Wrought-Iron Cross Site	October 23, 1989 (#89001698)	Address Restricted	Strasburg	
16	Ludwig and Christina Welk Homestead	Ludwig and Christina Welk Homestead	October 28, 1993 (#93001102)	2.5 miles northwest of Strasburg; 46°09′01″N 100°12′27″W	Strasburg	Birthplace of Lawrence Welk
17	Willows Hotel	Willows Hotel	May 2, 1996 (#96000522)	112 S. Broadway; 46°15′59″N 100°13′58″W	Linton	

== Former listings ==
	Name on the Register	Image	Date listed	Date removed	Location	City or town	Description
1	Johannes Goldade House		January 27, 1983 (#83001932)	December 6, 2016	Southeast of Linton off ND 13; 46°13′07″N 99°57′36″W	Linton	

== See also ==
- List of National Historic Landmarks in North Dakota
- National Register of Historic Places listings in North Dakota
