= Site C =

Site C may refer to:

== Places ==
- John Horgan Dam, Peace River, British Columbia, Canada; known as Site C dam during planning and construction
- St. Maixent Replacement Barracks Site C, Saint-Maixent-l'École, Poitou-Charentes, France
- Battery C Site, Helena, Arkansas, USA; a U.S. Civil War site
- Eglin Air Force Base Site C, several locations on Elgin AFB, Walton County, Florida, USA
  - Eglin AFB Site C-6, phased array radar station
- Nike Missile Site C, the Chicago, Illinois, USA, defense area
  - Nike Missile Site C-47, Portage, Indiana, USA
- Quirauk Mountain Site C, Washington County, Maryland., USA; a U.S. DOD radio communication outpost
- International Broadcasting Bureau Greenville Transmitting Station Site C, North Carolina, USA
- Holy Trinity Cemetery, Wrought-Iron Cross Site C, Strasburg, North Dakota, USA
- St. John's Cemetery, Wrought-Iron Cross Site C, Zeeland, North Dakota, USA
- St. Mary's Cemetery, Wrought-Iron Cross Site C, Hague, North Dakota, USA

== Other uses ==
- Sierra Sciences Site C, a repressor binding site patented in 2004

== See also ==
- Site (disambiguation)
- C (disambiguation)
