= The Church of Jesus Christ of Latter-day Saints in North Dakota =

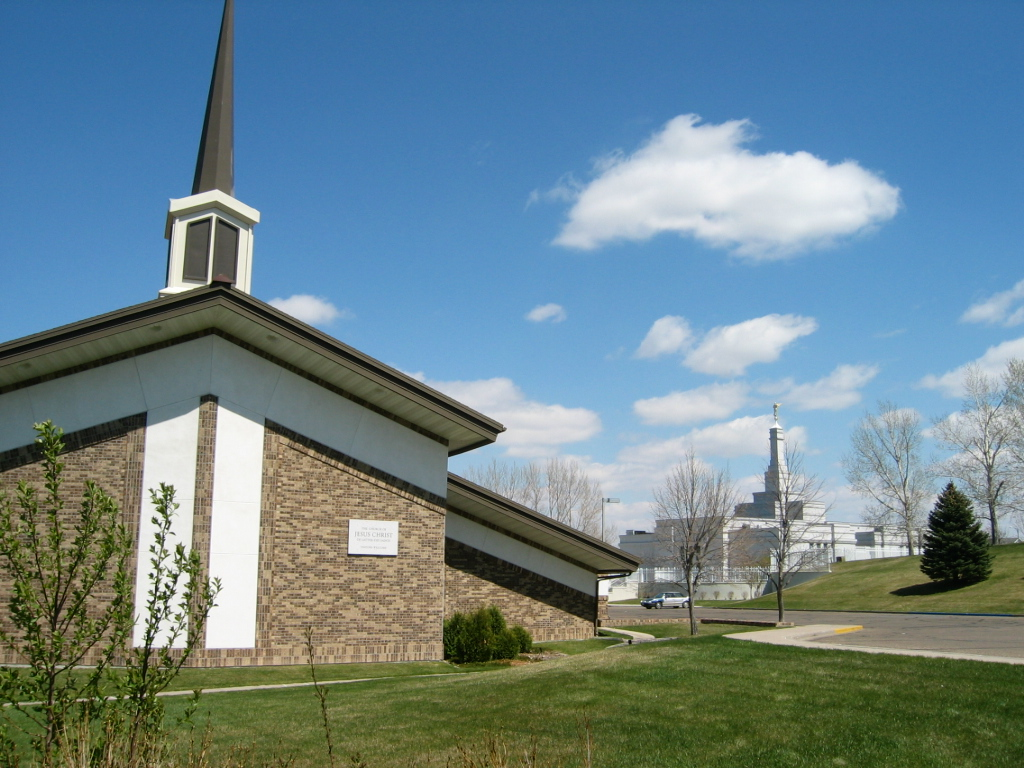
- A meetinghouse next to the Bismarck North Dakota Temple
- Area: US Central
- Members: 11,807 (2025)
- Stakes: 3
- Wards: 20
- Branches: 7
- Total Congregations: 27
- Missions: 1
- Temples: 1
- FamilySearch Centers: 7

The Church of Jesus Christ of Latter-day Saints (LDS Church) held its first congregation in the U.S. state of North Dakota in 1919. In 2025, there were 11,807 members in 27 congregations.

Official church membership as a percentage of general population was 1.49% in 2017. According to the 2014 Pew Forum on Religion & Public Life survey, less than 1% of North Dakotans self-identify themselves most closely with the LDS Church. The LDS Church is the 7th largest denomination in North Dakota.

== History ==
Membership in North Dakota
Year	Membership
1983	3,529
1989*	4,500
1999	5,070
2009	6,140
2019	11,550
2025	11,807
*Membership was published as a rounded number. Source: Wendall J. Ashton; Jim M. Wall, Deseret News, various years, Church Almanac State Information: North Dakota

The first missionaries of the LDS Church arrived in North Dakota in 1885, and the first LDS meetinghouse was built in 1919 in Sully Lake. However the first stake in North Dakota was not organized until 1977 in Fargo. North Dakota was the final US state to have a stake within its boundaries.

During the North Dakota oil boom, the LDS Church in North Dakota saw significant growth in multiple communities in the western part of the state. The growth was largely driven by the influx of out-of-state oil field workers and their families from other nearby western states with high Latter-day Saint populations. In some of the communities, church membership doubled during the oil boom necessitating the construction of multiple new meetinghouses, chapels, and other church facilities.

The number of missionaries from the church sent to the Dakotas doubled during the pandemic, as many sent to other countries returned to the US.

== Stakes ==
As of May 2025, the following stakes had congregations located in North Dakota:

Stake	Organized	Mission	Temple District
Bismarck North Dakota	22 Sep 1996	North Dakota Bismarck	Bismarck North Dakota
Fargo North Dakota	7 Aug 1977	North Dakota Bismarck	Bismarck North Dakota
Minot North Dakota	4 May 2014	North Dakota Bismarck	Bismarck North Dakota
Glendive Montana	4 May 1997	North Dakota Bismarck	Billings Montana

== Missions ==
The South Dakota Rapid City Mission was consolidated into the North Dakota Bismarck Mission in 2015, which includes entire state of North Dakota. As of 2020, the mission was one of the larger missions in the LDS Church.

== Temples ==
The Bismarck North Dakota Temple was dedicated on September 19, 1999, by LDS Church president Gordon B. Hinckley. It was built at a cost of $4 million. The Watford City Ward in the Glendive Montana Stake is located in the Billings Montana Temple District. In 2020, a new statue of the Angel Moroni was installed on the temple to replace the weathered original statue.

61. Bismarck North Dakota Temple; Official website; News & images	
Location: Announced: Groundbreaking: Dedicated: Size: Style:	Bismarck, North Dakota, United States; July 29, 1998 by Gordon B. Hinckley; October 17, 1998 by Kenneth Johnson; September 19, 1999 by Gordon B. Hinckley; 10,700 sq ft (990 m^{2}) on a 1.6-acre (0.65 ha) site Classic modern, single-spire design - designed by Ritterbush–Ellig–Hulsing and Church A&E Services

== See also ==
- The Church of Jesus Christ of Latter-day Saints membership statistics (United States)
- North Dakota: Religion
