= Goldade =

Goldade is a surname. The Dictionary of American Family Names states that its origin is unknown. Notable people with the surname include:

- Roxanne Goldade (born 1962), Canadian pediatrician and country singer
- Johannes Goldade, the namesake of the Johannes Goldade House
- Joseph Goldade, owner of KHTZ-FM
