= Arthur W. Van Horn =

American architect

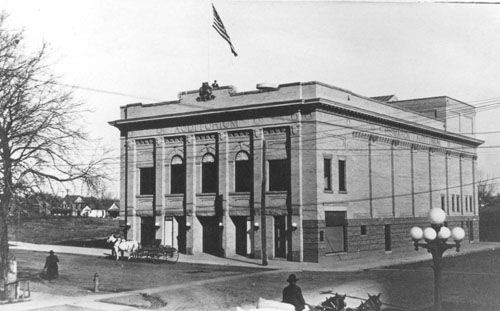
Period view of the Bismarck Civic Auditorium, designed by Van Horn and completed in 1914.

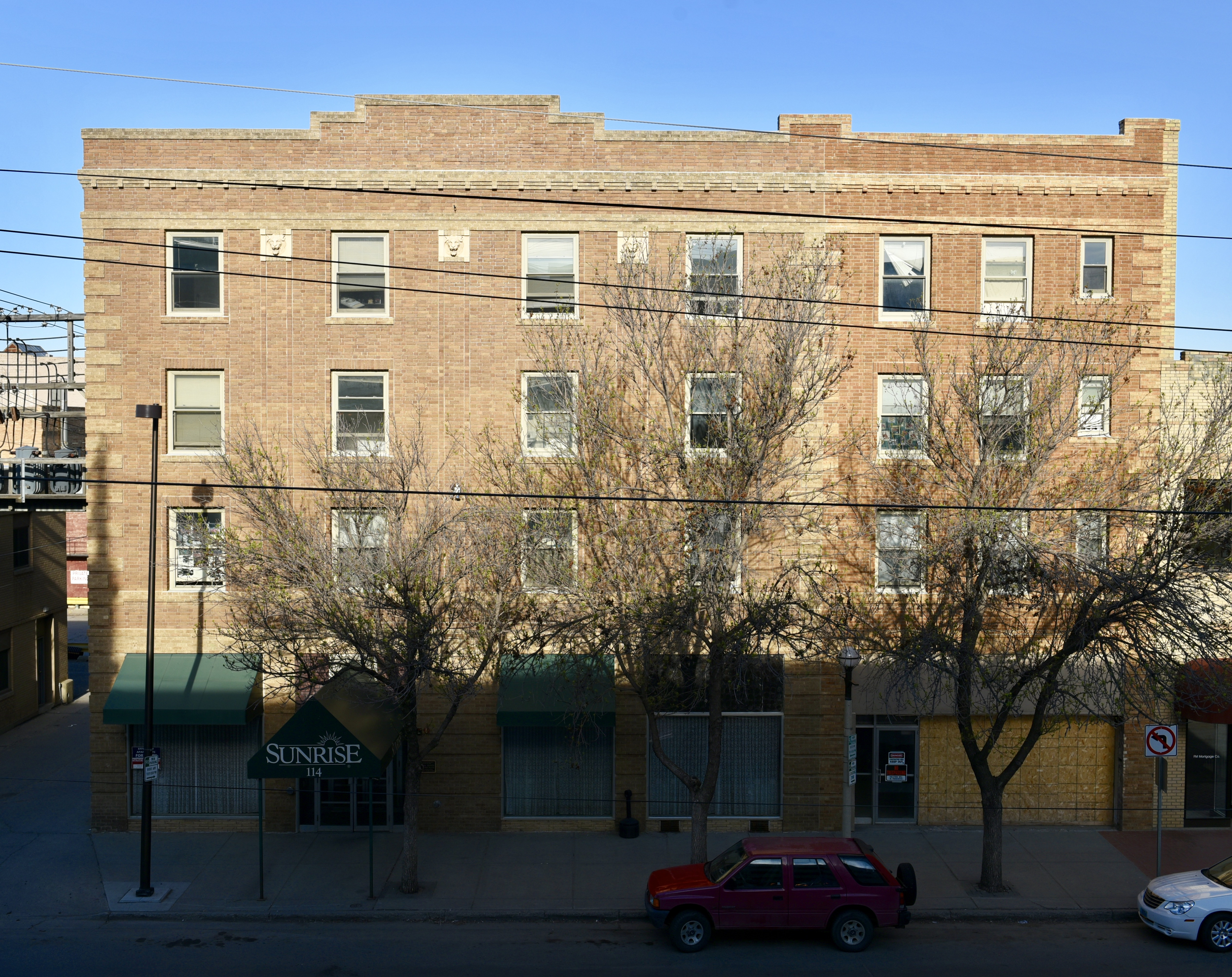
The Van Horn Hotel in Bismarck, built in two phases in 1916 and 1926.

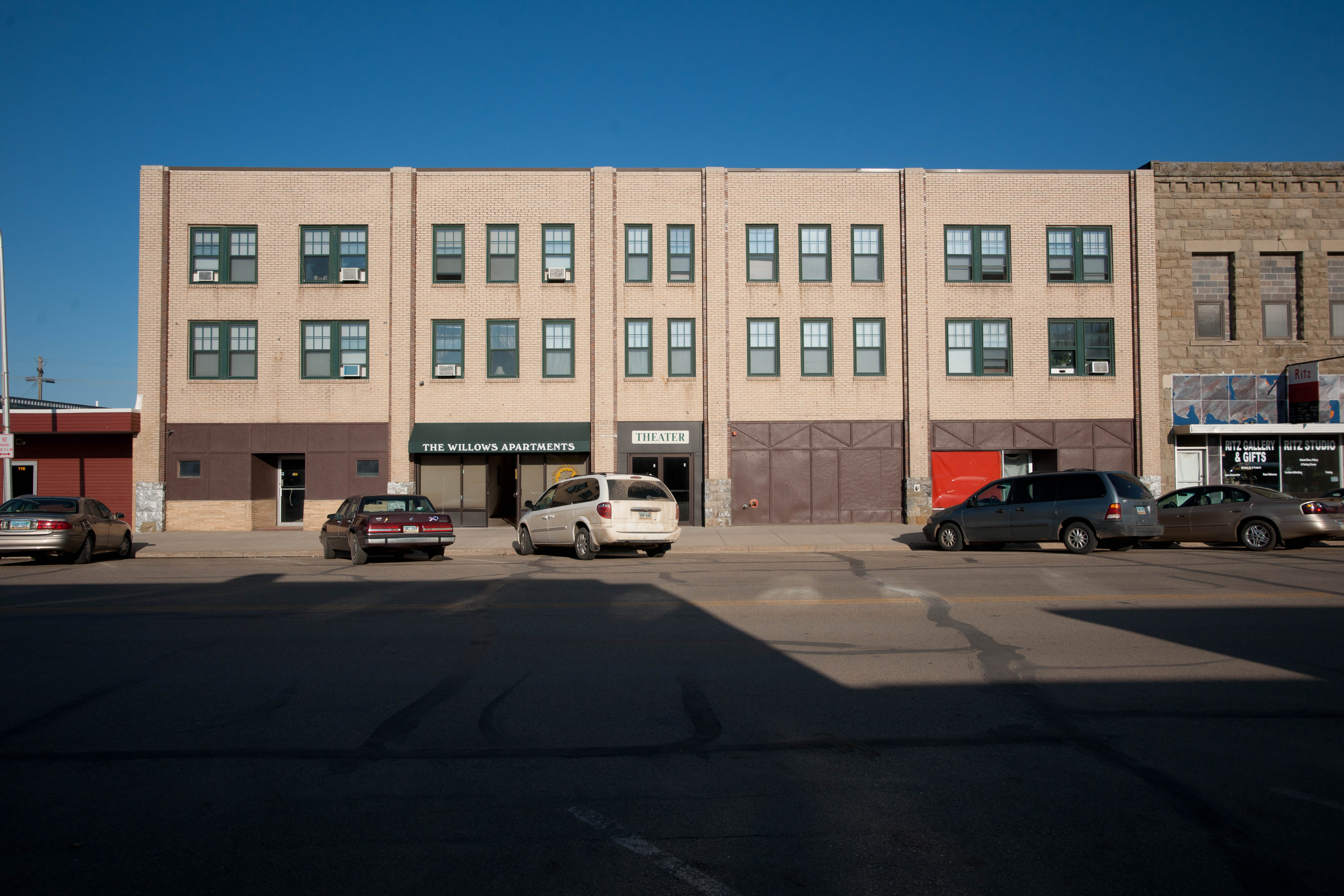
The Willows Hotel in Linton, built in 1922.

Arthur Wesley Van Horn (15 March 1860 – 18 April 1931) was a prolific architect of Bismarck, North Dakota. A number of Van Horn's works, alone or as part of his firm (Ritterbush Brothers), are listed on the U.S. National Register of Historic Places.

== Biography ==
Arthur Van Horn was born at Hackensack, in Bergen County, New Jersey. His parents were Cornelius J. and Almira Van Saun. He worked and studied in New York City, where he attended The Cooper Union for the Advancement of Science and Art and received private instruction in the study of architecture. He moved to Bismarck and began as an independent architect in 1883. He worked with Karl A. Loven in Van Horn & Loven during 1917–1919, and with Robert A. Ritterbush and Clarence W. Ritterbush in Van Horn & Ritterbush Brothers during 1920–1931. The Bismarck-based firm evolved as Ritterbush Brothers during 1931–1974 and subsequently as Ritterbush Associates.

== Notable works ==
- Henry J. Geierman house, (Note: A contributing property to the Bismarck Cathedral Area Historic District, NRHP-listed in 1980 and expanded in 1997.) 100 W Ave A, Bismarck, North Dakota (1908)
- Bismarck Civic Auditorium, (Note: A contributing resource to the Downtown Bismarck Historic District, NRHP-listed in 2001 and amended in 2012.) 201 N 6th St, Bismarck, North Dakota (1913–14, NRHP 1976)
- Frank E. Shepard house, 226 W Ave B, Bismarck, North Dakota (1916)
- Van Horn Hotel, 114 N 3rd St, Bismarck, North Dakota (1916 and 1926, NRHP 1984)
- Hughes Auto Building, 123 E Broadway Ave, Bismarck, North Dakota (1920)
- Olympia Building, 305 E Broadway Ave, Bismarck, North Dakota (1920)
- Logan County Courthouse, 301 Broadway, Napoleon, North Dakota (1921 and 1924, NRHP 1985)
- Willows Hotel, 112 S Broadway, Linton, North Dakota (1922, NRHP 1996)
- Dakota Hall, (Note: Formerly a contributing resource to the State Training School Historic District, NRHP-listed in 1996 and delisted in 2018.) North Dakota Youth Correctional Center, Mandan, North Dakota (1924–25, demolished circa 1996)
- Devine Hall, North Dakota Youth Correctional Center, Mandan, North Dakota (1928–29)
- Capital Chevrolet building, 101 E Broadway Ave, Bismarck, North Dakota (1929)
- Universal Motor Company building, 122 N 1st St, Bismarck, North Dakota (1930)

== See also ==
- Van Horn-Ritterbush Architecture Records, State Historical Society of North Dakota.
- Arthur W. Van Horn (1927) Van Horn Family of Bergen County, New Jersey, 1657-1927 (A.W. Van Horn)
