= Elzas Township, Emmons County, North Dakota =

Township in North Dakota, United States

Coordinates: 45.9746°N 100.0670°W

Elzas appearing as a 1940 Census enumeration district

Elzas Township (briefly known as Bull Run Township) was a former township in Emmons County, North Dakota. Its population in the 1920 Census was 279. The township was dissolved in 1925, and reverted back into the county's unorganized territory.

== History ==
Historical population
Year	Pop.
1920	279
1930	285
1940	299
Note: Elzas County was unincorporated in 1950. Source: US Census statistics, 1940

Elzas was first settled in 1886 by Ethnic Germans, a majority of whom came from Elsaß (now Shcherbanka, Ukraine). Many of these pioneers now constitute a large portion of the population in the nearby Hague. The first elections in Elzas Township took place in 1912 under the supervision of Peter Shier.
