= Rosalind Gefre =

American Catholic religious sister (1929–2026)

Sister Rosalind Gefre CSJ
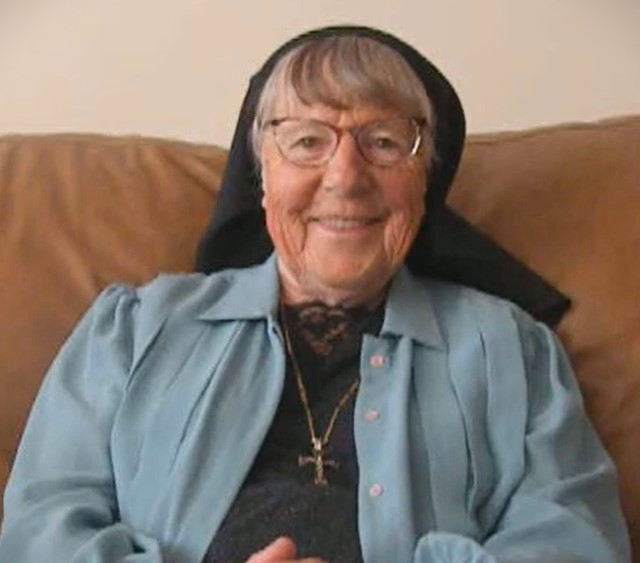
- Gefre in 2012

Personal life
- Born: Mary Margaret Gefre; November 6, 1929 Strasburg, North Dakota, U.S.
- Died: June 15, 2026 (aged 96)
- Other name: Sister Roz
- Occupation: Religious sister and masseuse

Religious life
- Religion: Catholic
- Order: Sisters of St. Joseph of Carondelet
- Profession: 1949

Rosalind Gefre CSJ (born Mary Margaret Gefre; November 6, 1929 – June 15, 2026), also known as Sister Roz, was an American Catholic religious sister of the Sisters of St. Joseph of Carondelet. She was known for attempting to reduce stigma around massage therapy and for performing massages for fans at St. Paul Saints minor league baseball games.

== Early life ==
Mary Margaret Gefre was born in Strasburg, North Dakota, in 1929 as the eighth of twelve children. Her father died when she was six. She grew up on a farm near Strasburg, speaking only German at home, and was occasionally punished in school for accidentally slipping into German. Her first time using English as her primary language was when she entered the convent. Gefre entered the Sisters of St. Joseph of Carondelet in Saint Paul, Minnesota, in 1948 at the age of 19, taking the religious name Rosalind the following year. As a religious sister, she worked as a cook and as a licensed practical nurse, gaining her licensure in the latter in 1968.

== Massage therapy ==
Gefre began to take care of her elderly mother in 1968. While taking her mother to a massage, Gefre herself received one. She stated that afterwards, she had her first good night of sleep in years and her digestive system had improved as well. She began to study massage therapy and spent more than 1,000 hours training in both Aberdeen, South Dakota, and Saint Paul. She then began practicing massage at a YMCA in Fargo, North Dakota.

During a time when massage parlors were associated with prostitution, Gefre sought to change the perception around the profession and worked to change laws that would distinguish licensed operations from sex trade. On February 14, 1983, she opened a clinic on Grand Avenue in Saint Paul with two other women. Two days later, a vice squad temporarily closed the practice as unlicensed, citing a law seeking to prevent prostitution. While Gefre and her partners did not object to becoming licensed, they did object to being shut down under the city ordinance for preventing prostitution and challenged the closing in court. They received a temporary restraining order allowing them to reopen in March. Despite running a professional and non-sexual clinic, Gefre occasionally received calls from persons looking to "talk dirty to a nun"; on one such occasion, Gefre rebuked the man, stating: "One of these days you'll die and you'll be face to face with the Lord. Is this call the kind of thing you want to be judged for? Do you feel good about what you're doing?", to which the man broke down into sobs.

She compared her ministry to the story of Jesus cleansing a leper, and stated that she knew Jesus was standing next to her as she performed the massages. She has said "We are a society that is God-hungry and skin-hungry. In the context of massage, to some extent you can do both." By 1988, Gefre operated three massage centers and a massage school in the Twin Cities area. She operated massage clinics in Minneapolis, Edina, Saint Paul, and White Bear Lake, and ran massage schools in West Saint Paul and Fargo, North Dakota. At one point, she had five schools and seven clinics, though the Great Recession caused many to close. She was no longer affiliated with the remaining clinics that use her name, which they do with permission.

In 1993, Gefre began to offer massages at the baseball games of the newly-formed minor league St. Paul Saints team. While for the first several years business was slow because of the social stigma around massages, lines eventually began to lengthen and Gefre became a popular source for massages, prayers, and hugs. Her popularity became such that the Minnesota Timberwolves have also had her perform massages at the Target Center. By 2006, it was estimated that Gefre had given 7,000 massages at Saints games. On June 8, 2006, and August 10, 2024, the Saints conducted Sister Roz bobblehead giveaways. Despite attending Saints games for over two decades, Gefre knew very little about the game of baseball. In 2015, at the age of 84, Gefre went skydiving to raise money for the Aging But Dangerous charity. She is briefly featured in the Netflix documentary The Saint of Second Chances about Saints president Mike Veeck.

== Death ==
Gefre died on June 15, 2026, at the age of 96.
