= Saints Peter and Paul Catholic Church Complex (Strasburg, North Dakota) =

Historic church in North Dakota, United States

- U.S. National Register of Historic Places
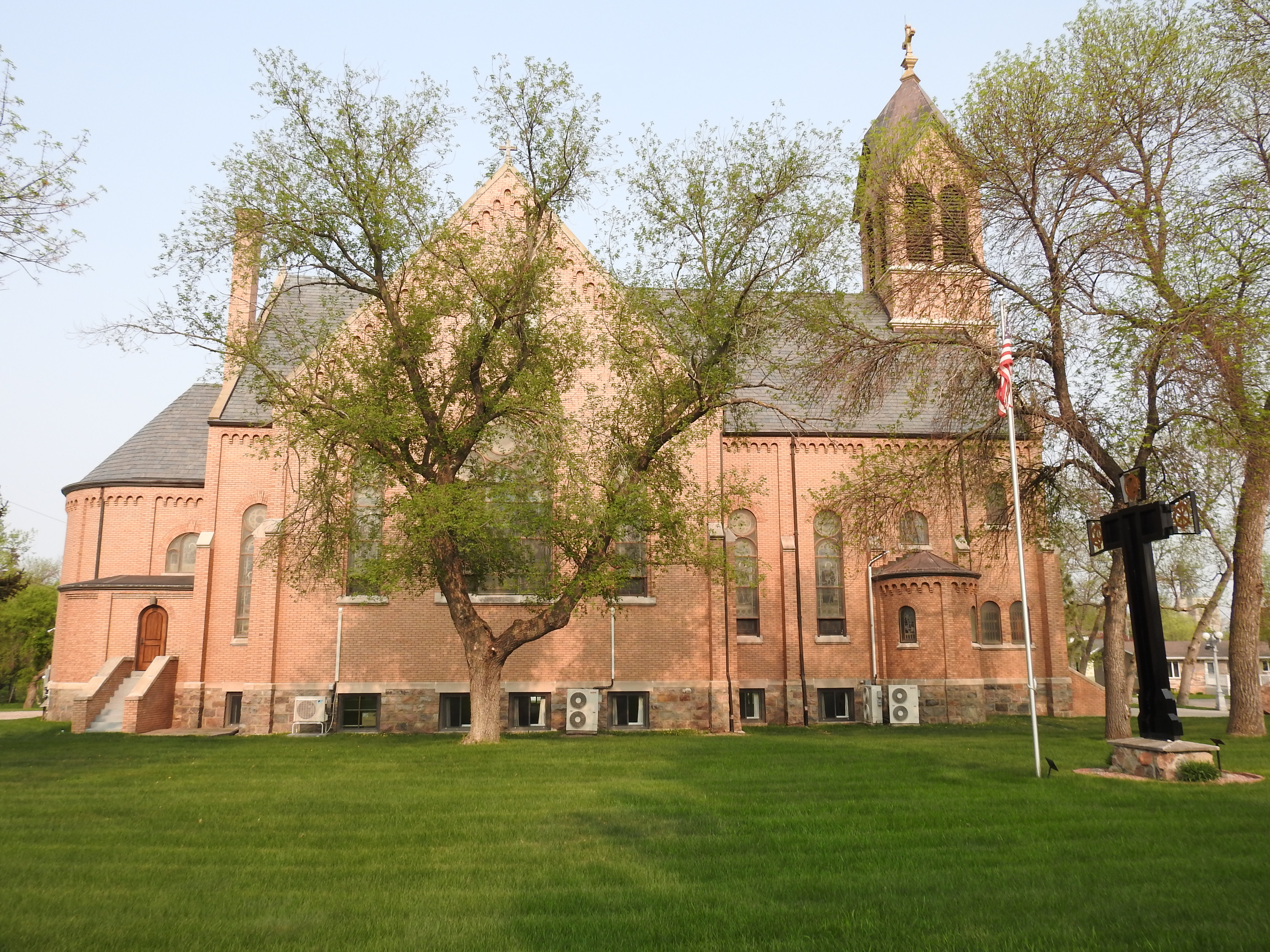

- Location within North Dakota Location within the United States
- Location: First Ave., Strasburg, North Dakota
- Coordinates: 46°8′10″N 100°9′42″W
- Area: 1 acre (0.40 ha)
- Built: 1910
- NRHP reference No.: 86002786
- Added to NRHP: September 25, 1986

The Saints Peter and Paul Catholic Church Complex on First Avenue in Strasburg, North Dakota was listed on the National Register of Historic Places in 1986. It was built in 1910 to serve immigrants who were Germans from Russia. The complex includes a residence within its two contributing buildings.

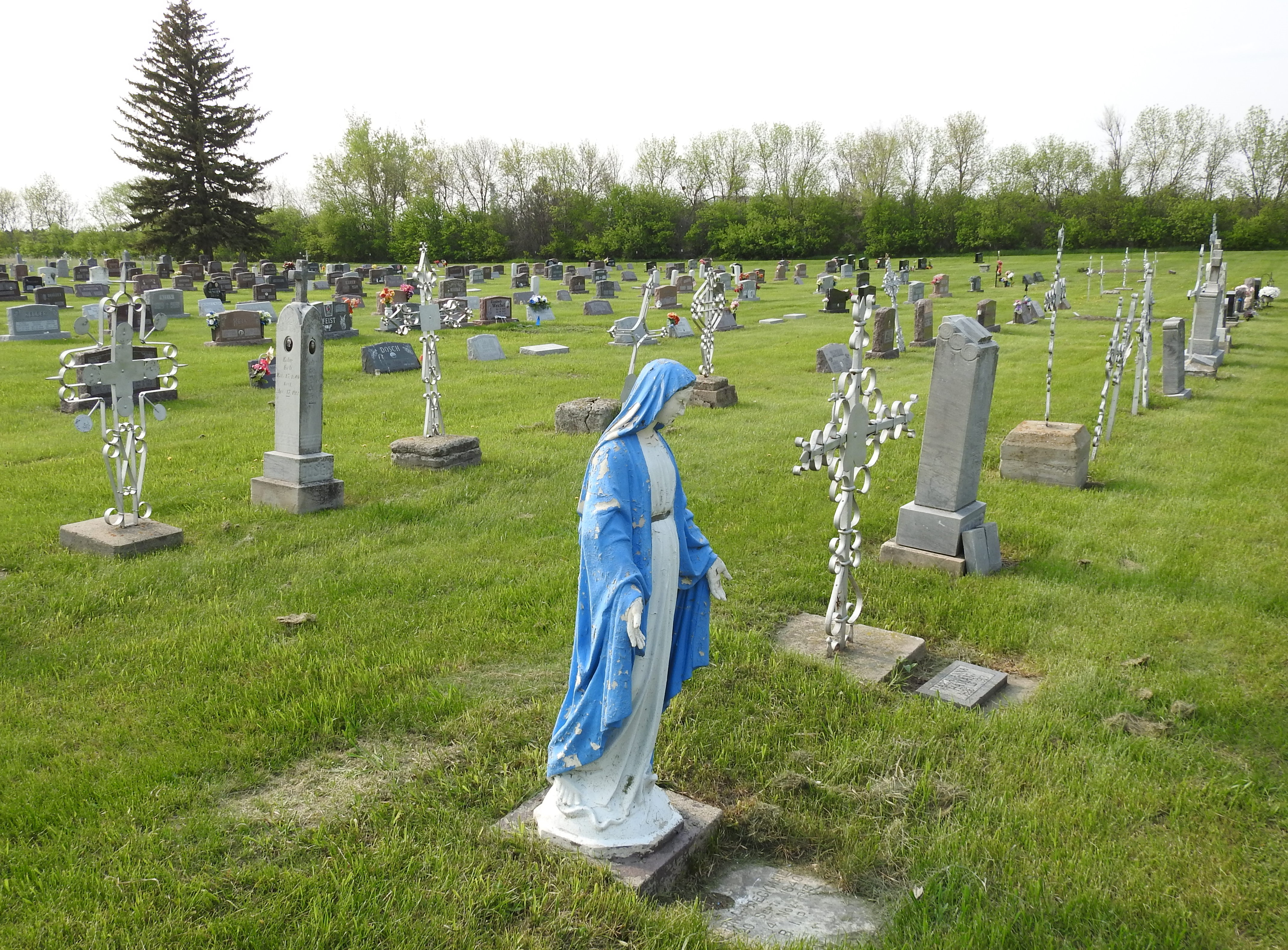
Cemetery view

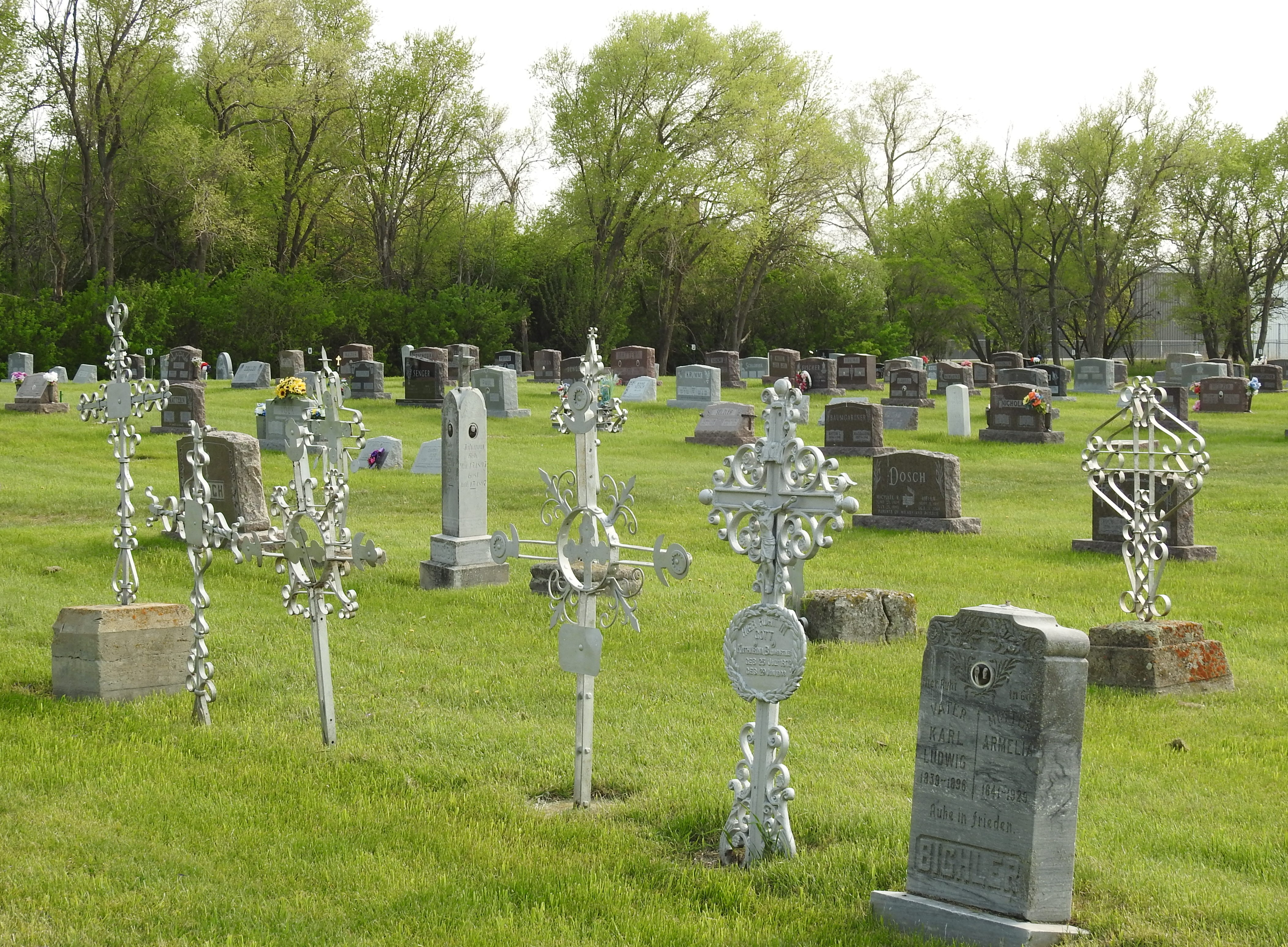
Wrought-iron Crosses in Church Cemetery
