= Wrought-iron cross sites of St. Aloysius Cemetery (Hague, North Dakota) =

- St. Aloysius Cemetery, Wrought-Iron Cross Site A St. Aloysius Cemetery, Wrought-Iron Cross Site B
- U.S. National Register of Historic Places
- Nearest city: Hague, North Dakota
- Area: less than one acre
- Built by: Simon Marquardt (Site B)
- Architectural style: Wrought-iron cross
- MPS: German-Russian Wrought-Iron Cross Sites in Central North Dakota MPS
- NRHP reference No.: 89001696, 89001697
- Added to NRHP: October 23, 1989

Two historic sites within the St. Aloysius Cemetery near Strasburg, North Dakota, United States, identified as St. Aloysius Cemetery, Wrought-Iron Cross Site A and St. Aloysius Cemetery, Wrought-Iron Cross Site B were listed on the National Register of Historic Places in 1989. They include wrought-iron crosses. The listing for Site A included 22 contributing objects. The listing for Site B includes just one contributing object, which is work by Simon Marquardt.

Simon Marquardt, of Zeeland, North Dakota, was one of a number of "German-Russian blacksmiths in central North Dakota [who] developed their own cross styles and [whose] work was known for miles around them."
