= Van Horn Hotel =

- U.S. National Register of Historic Places
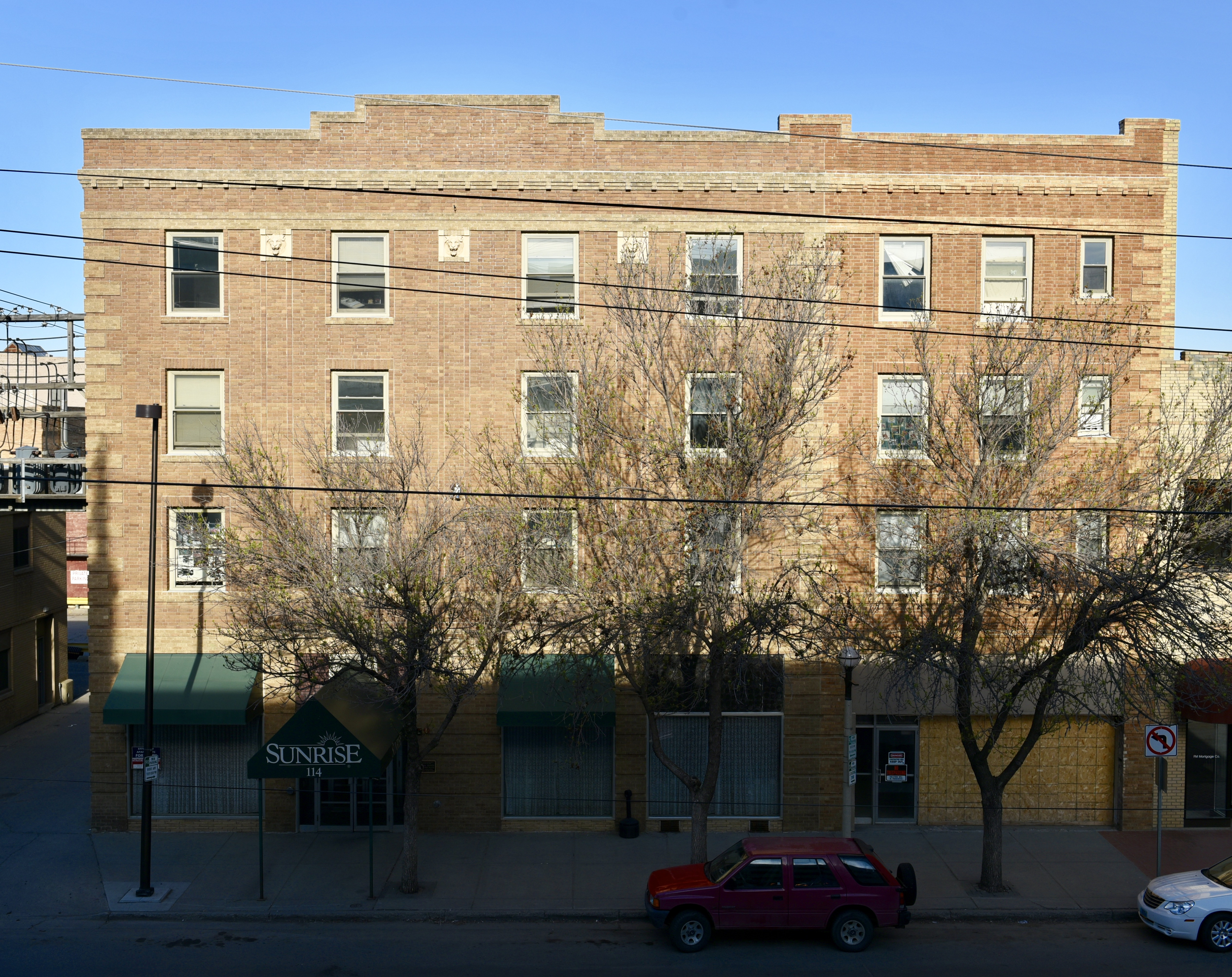

- Location within North Dakota Location within the United States
- Location: 114 N. 3rd St., Bismarck, North Dakota
- Coordinates: 46°48′22″N 100°47′16″W
- Area: less than one acre
- Built: 1916
- Architect: Van Horn, Arthur W. (original); Kosir, Al F. (1960 remodelling)
- NRHP reference No.: 84002759
- Added to NRHP: May 10, 1984

The Van Horn Hotel on N. 3rd St. in Bismarck, North Dakota, United States, was designed by architect Arthur W. Van Horn. It was built in 1916. It has also been known as the Prince Hotel. It was listed on the National Register of Historic Places in 1984.

Notables who have stayed there include Shirley Temple, Eleanor Roosevelt, General George C. Marshall, and Roy Rogers and Dale Evans.
