= Bismarck North Dakota Temple =

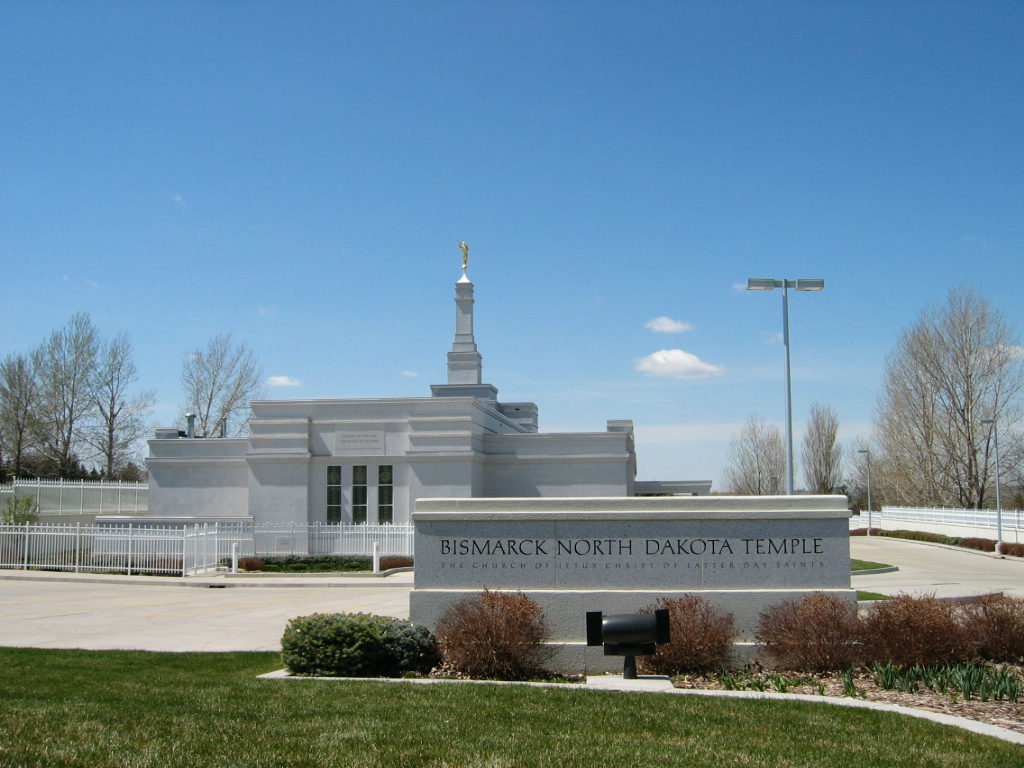
- Interactive map of Bismarck North Dakota Temple
- Number: 61
- Dedication: September 19, 1999, by Gordon B. Hinckley
- Site: 1.6 acres (0.65 ha)
- Floor area: 10,700 ft^{2} (990 m^{2})
- Height: 71 ft (22 m)
- Official website • News & images

Church chronology
| ← Columbus Ohio Temple | Bismarck North Dakota Temple | → Columbia South Carolina Temple |

Additional information
- Announced: July 29, 1998, by Gordon B. Hinckley
- Groundbreaking: October 17, 1998, by Kenneth Johnson
- Open house: September 10–11, 1999
- Current president: Jerry L Parker
- Designed by: Ritterbush–Ellig–Hulsing and Church A&E Services
- Location: Bismarck, North Dakota, United States
- Coordinates: 46°50′20.00040″N 100°48′50.67000″W
- Exterior finish: Granite veneer from Québec
- Design: Classic modern, single-spire design
- Baptistries: 1
- Ordinance rooms: 2 (two-stage progressive)
- Sealing rooms: 2

The Bismarck North Dakota Temple is the 61st operating temple of the Church of Jesus Christ of Latter-day Saints, and is located in Bismarck, North Dakota. The temple was announced by the church's First Presidency on July 29, 1998, as part of an initiative to build smaller temples closer to remote church members. It was the first temple constructed in the state of North Dakota.

Designed collaboratively by the church’s architecture and engineering division and local architect, Bill Ellig, the temple has a single spire with a gold-leafed statue of the angel Moroni, symbolizing the restoration and spreading of the gospel, on its top. Its contemporary architectural style uses white marble

Construction began with a groundbreaking ceremony on October 17, 1998, conducted by Kenneth Johnson of the Seventy. Despite the region's challenging weather, construction concluded in less than a year. Following completion, a public open house was held on September 10–11, 1999, with approximately 10,260 visitors touring the building. Church president Gordon B. Hinckley dedicated the temple in three sessions on September 19, 1999. This was his first visit to North Dakota, the only U.S. state he had not previously visited.

== History ==
The church began missionary work in North Dakota in 1914 and by 1930, there were 145 members in the state. By 1997, there were 5,000 members.

The temple was announced by the First Presidency on July 29, 1998, as part of an initiative to construct smaller temples, making temples and their ordinances more accessible to members in remote areas.

On August 8, 1998, the church announced the temple would be built on a 1.6-acre (0.65 ha) property at 2930 Cody Drive, adjacent to a church meetinghouse. Plans identified a single-story, 10,700 square-foot structure.

A groundbreaking ceremony took place on October 17, 1998, presided over by Kenneth Johnson, and was attended by around 1,000 local church members and community leaders.

After construction was completed, a public open house was held on September 10–11, 1999, with approximately 10,260 visitors touring the building. Gordon B. Hinckley dedicated the temple in three sessions on September 19, 1999.

In 2020, like all the church's others, the Bismarck North Dakota Temple was closed for a time in response to the COVID-19 pandemic.

== Design and architecture ==
The temple was designed in a classic modern style by the church’s architecture and engineering division, in collaboration with local architect, Bill Ellig. The temple occupies 1.6 acres (0.65 ha) at 2930 Cody Drive. At the time of its dedication, The temple district covered about 200,000 square miles (5.0E+5 km^{2}) and served about 9,000 members.

The single-story structure, approximately 10,700 square feet, has an exterior built with a gravel veneer from Quebec, marble from Italy, along with a single spire with a gold-leafed angel Moroni statue on the topc. The temple has two ordinance rooms, two sealing rooms, and a baptistry.

The angel Moroni on the temple was designed by sculptor LaVar Wallgren, who was commissioned specifically for the project. Wallgren’s version is shown carrying a scroll and is younger than other Moroni statues. The statue symbolically represents the restoration (return) of Jesus Christ’s church through Joseph Smith.

== Temple presidents and admittance ==
The church's temples are directed by a temple president and matron, each typically serving for a term of three years. The president and matron oversee the administration of temple operations and provide guidance and training for both temple patrons and staff.

Serving from 1999 to 2002, the first president was Robert B. Dahlgren, with Carmen L. Dahlgren serving as matron. As of 2023, Guy R. Schiessl is the president, with Karen E. Schiessl.

After construction was completed, a public open house was held from September 10–11, 1999, followed by its dedication by Gordon B. Hinckley on September 19, 1999.

Like all the church's temples, it is not used for Sunday worship services. To members of the church, temples are regarded as sacred houses of the Lord. Once dedicated, only church members with a current temple recommend can enter for worship.

== See also ==
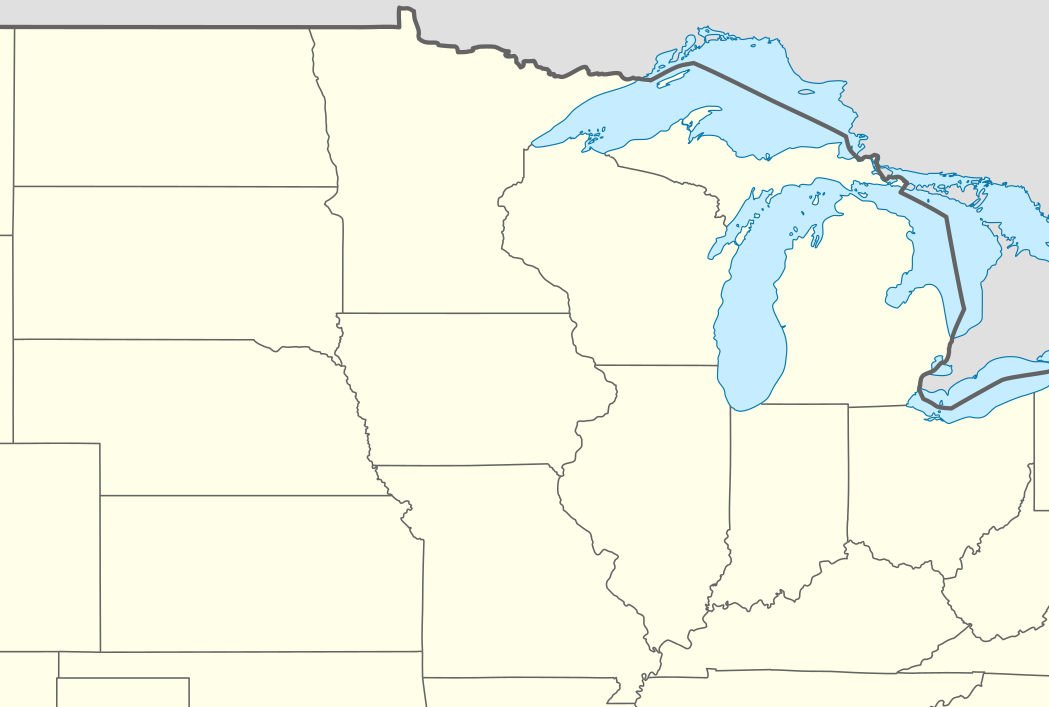
Temples in the United States Midwest
- = Operating
- = Under construction
- = Announced
- = Closed for renovation
- Russell T. Osguthorpe, former temple president
- Comparison of temples of The Church of Jesus Christ of Latter-day Saints
- List of temples of The Church of Jesus Christ of Latter-day Saints
- List of temples of The Church of Jesus Christ of Latter-day Saints by geographic region
- Temple architecture (Latter-day Saints)
- The Church of Jesus Christ of Latter-day Saints in North Dakota

== Additional reading ==
- Kruckenberg, Janet (October 24, 1998), "Ground broken for two more temples", Church News
- Kruckenberg, Janet (February 20, 1999), "The announcements of new holy edifices bring joy and tears", Church News, archived from the original on June 29, 2019
- Kruckenberg, Janet (June 19, 1999), "Statue tops temple in North Dakota", Church News
- "Bismarck temple open house opening doors to many hearts", Church News, September 18, 1999
- Van Orden, Dell (September 25, 1999), "Shortening the vast distances", Church News
