= St. Mary's Church Non-contiguous Historic District =

Historic district in North Dakota, United States

- U.S. National Register of Historic Places
- U.S. Historic district
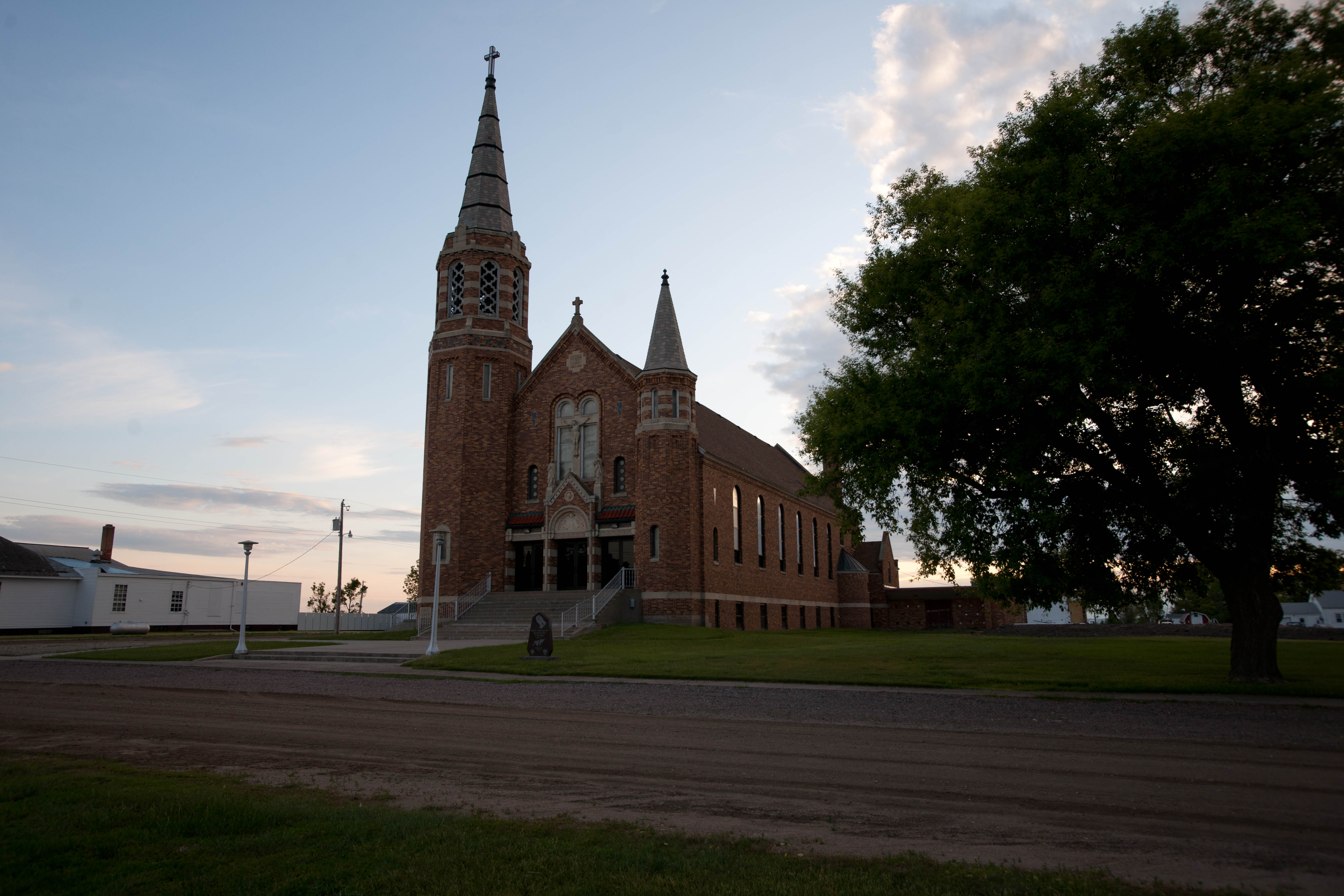
- St. Mary's Church

- Location within North Dakota Location within the United States
- Location: Off ND 11, Hague, North Dakota
- Area: less than one acre
- Built: 1885
- Built by: Charles A. Hausler, Defort Schneider
- Architectural style: Romanesque
- NRHP reference No.: 83004066
- Added to NRHP: October 13, 1983

St. Mary's Church Non-contiguous Historic District is a historic district near Hague, North Dakota, United States. The church was founded by immigrants who were Germans from Russia.

The district is composed of St. Mary's Church and the original St. Mary's cemetery, which is located at a separate site. It includes work from 1885 and work by Charles A. Hausler and Defort Schneider. It was listed on the National Register of Historic Places in 1983 with two contributing buildings and a contributing site.

== See also ==
- Old St. Mary's Cemetery, Wrought-Iron Cross Site, also NRHP-listed
