= Bismarck Civic Auditorium =

- U.S. National Register of Historic Places
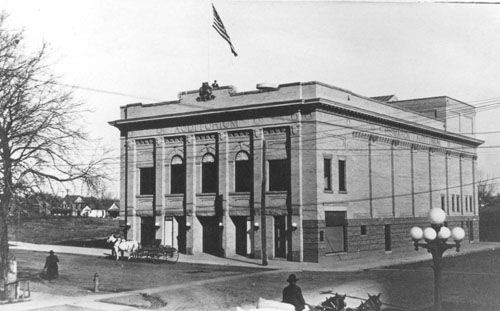
- Civic Auditorium, Bismarck, c. 1914-1919

- Location within North Dakota Location within the United States
- Location: 201 N. 6th St., Bismarck, North Dakota
- Coordinates: 46°48′24″N 100°46′56″W
- Area: less than one acre
- Built: 1914
- Architect: Van Horn, Arthur W.
- NRHP reference No.: 76001351
- Added to NRHP: June 7, 1976

The Bismarck Civic Auditorium on North 6th Street in Bismarck, North Dakota, was built in 1914. It has also been known as City Auditorium and, after 1989, the Belle Mehus Civic Auditorium. It was listed on the National Register of Historic Places in 1976.

It was a major work of Bismarck architect Arthur Wesley Van Horn (1860-1931). Preliminary design work was done by architects Reed and Stem of St. Paul, Minnesota.
