= Robert A. Ritterbush =

American architect (1891–1980)

- Born: October 13, 1891; Oakes, North Dakota
- Died: January 18, 1980 (aged 88); Bismarck, North Dakota
- Occupation: Architect

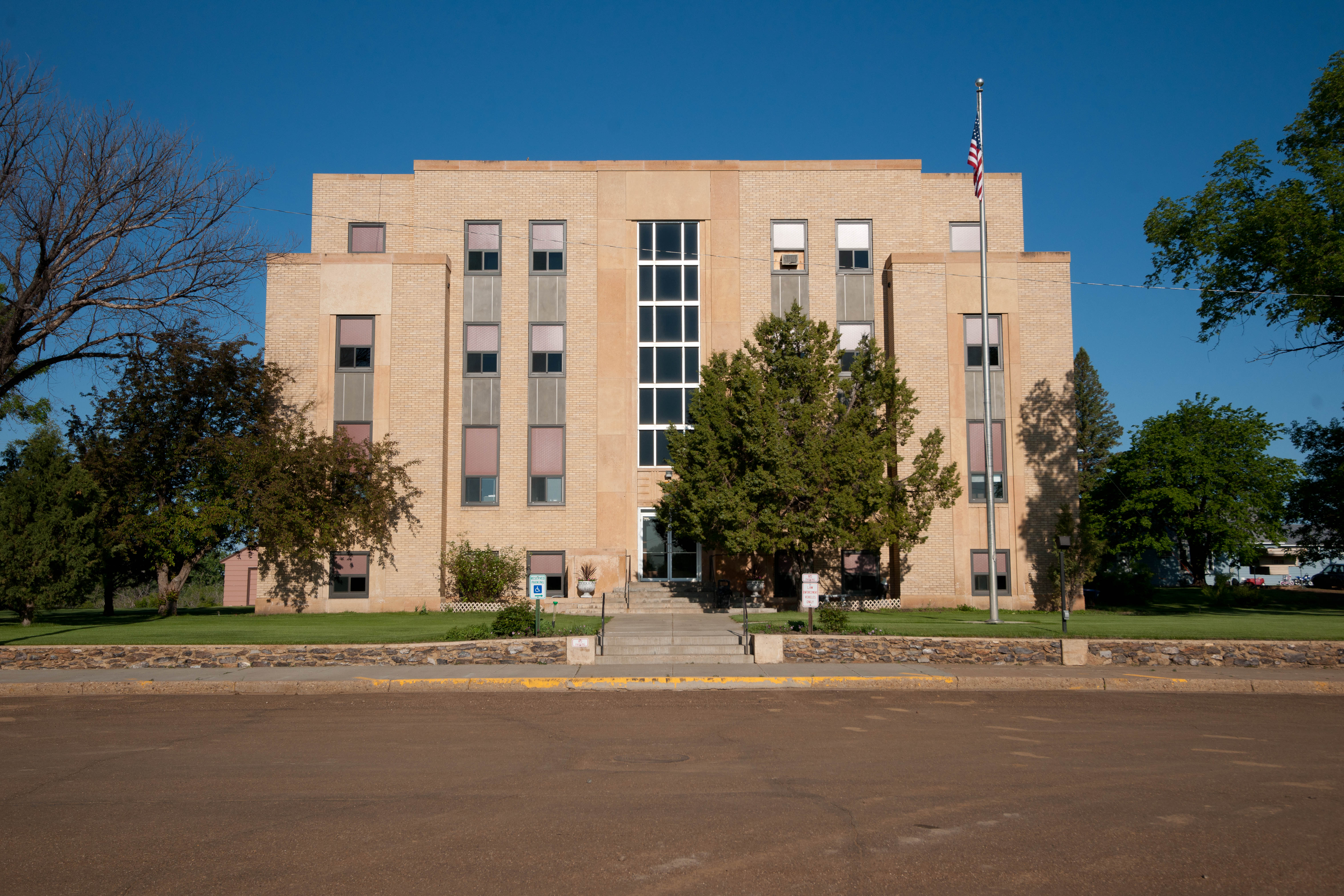
The Hettinger County Courthouse in Mott, designed by Ritterbush Brothers and completed in 1936.

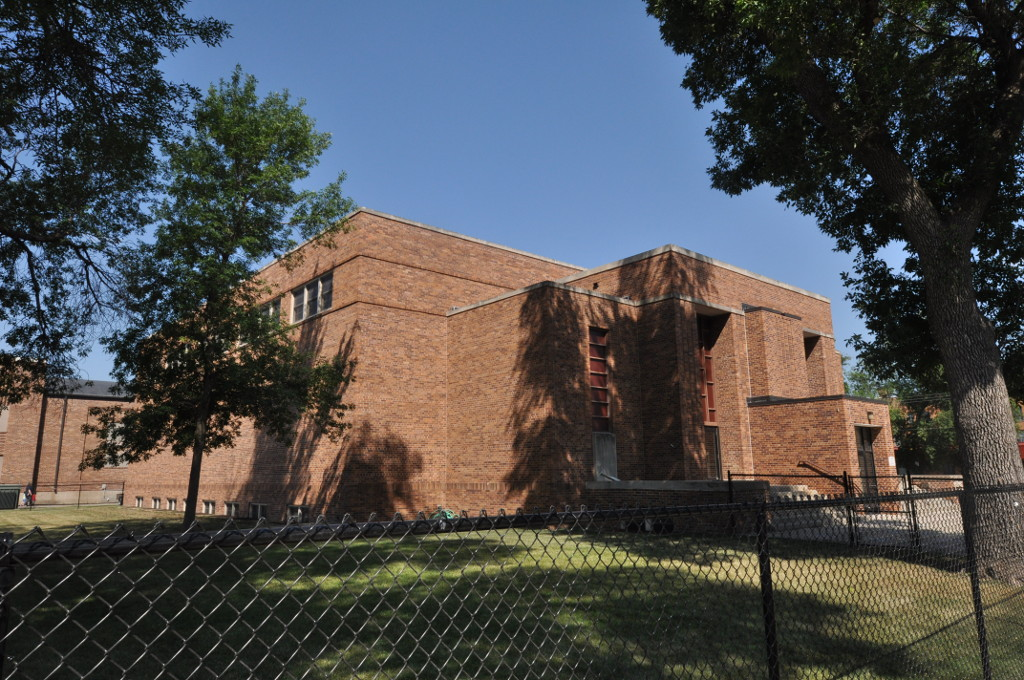
The Valley City Municipal Auditorium, completed in 1937.

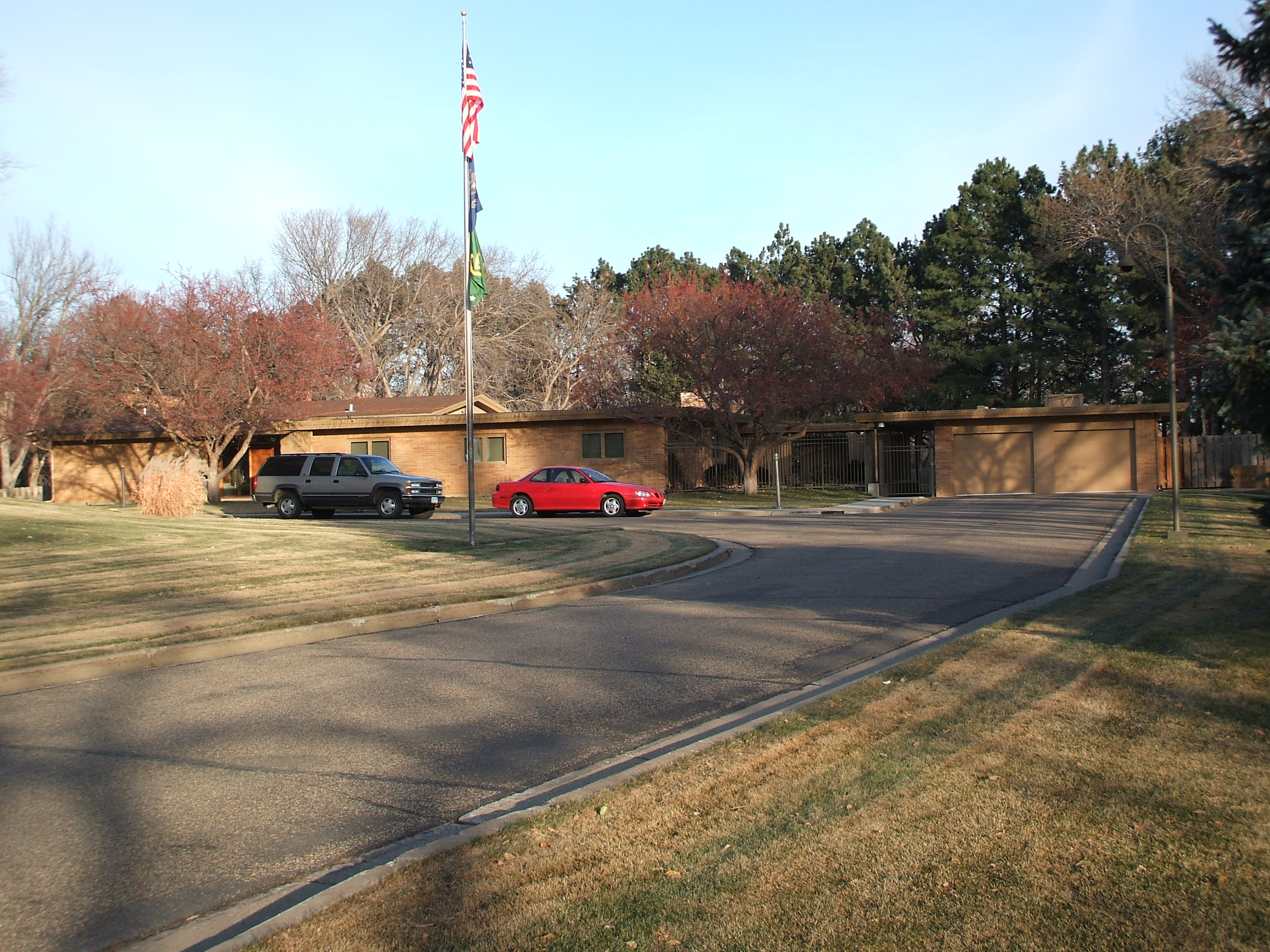
The former North Dakota Governor's Residence in Bismarck, completed in 1960 and demolished in 2018.

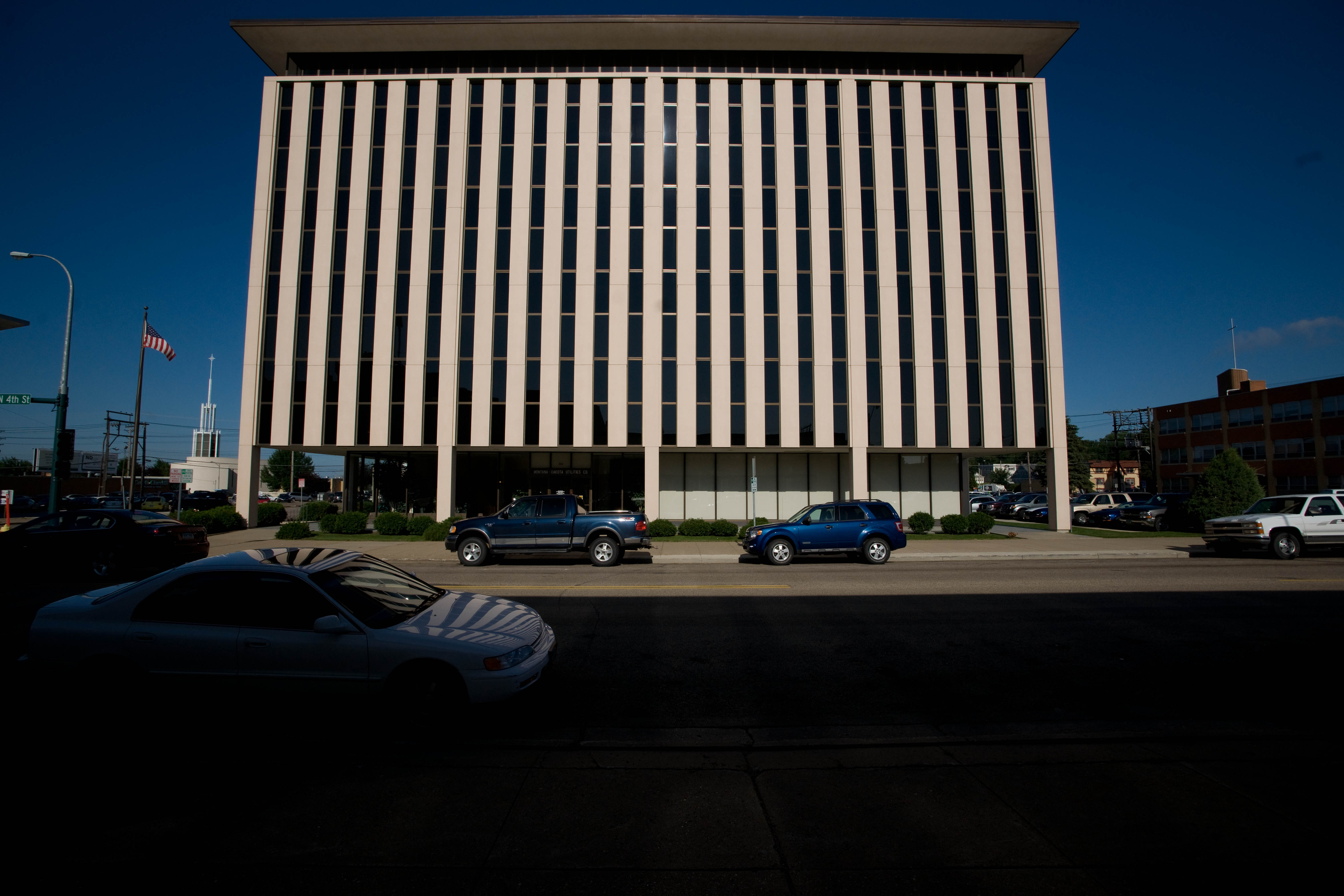
The Montana–Dakota Utilities Company Building in Bismarck, completed in 1968.

Robert A. Ritterbush FAIA (1891–1980) was an American architect in practice in Bismarck, North Dakota, from 1920 until 1967.

== Life and career ==
Robert Alonzo Ritterbush was born October 13, 1891, in Oakes, North Dakota, to William Donald Ritterbush, a contractor, and Elizabeth (Dyer) Ritterbush. He was educated at the Ohio Mechanics Institute, later part of the University of Cincinnati, graduating in 1917. During World War I he served with the navy in France. In 1920 he returned to North Dakota, settling in Bismarck, where he and his brother, Clarence W. Ritterbush (1893–1990), formed a partnership with established architect Arthur Van Horn. When Van Horn died in 1931 the brothers succeeded to the practice, which they renamed Ritterbush Brothers. Clarence retired in 1953, and was replaced as partner by Robert H. Ritterbush, Robert's son. The elder Ritterbush retired as partner in 1967, but was retained as a consultant until 1973, when he fully retired.

In 1922 Ritterbush joined the North Dakota Association of Architects, of which Van Horn had been a founding member in 1917. In 1953 the association achieved its long-time goal of affiliating with the American Institute of Architects, and all of its members, including Ritterbush, became members of the AIA. From the time he joined in 1922 until 1965 he was secretary–treasurer of the North Dakota association. In 1966, following his retirement from that office, the association honored him for his "46 years of practice in architecture and outstanding service to the profession." In 1969 he was elected a Fellow of the American Institute of Architects, the organization's highest membership honor.

== Personal life ==
Ritterbush was married in 1921 to Ruth Nichols in Minneapolis, and they had two children, including Robert Harrison Ritterbush (1926–2019).

== Death ==
Robert A. Ritterbush died January 18, 1980, in Bismarck.[6]

== Legacy ==
After Ritterbush retired in 1973, his son Robert and his associate, Merlin E. Redrud, continued the practice as Ritterbush Associates. The firm was renamed Ritterbush–Ellig–Hulsing in 1997. Major projects of the successor firm include the judicial wing addition to the North Dakota State Capitol, completed in 1981, and the Bismarck North Dakota Temple of the Church of Jesus Christ of Latter-day Saints, completed in 1999. The younger Ritterbush died in 2019, and in 2021 the firm was merged with EAPC Architects Engineers, a large firm from Grand Forks.

In addition to three designed with Van Horn, two buildings designed by Ritterbush have been listed on the United States National Register of Historic Places. Others contribute to listed historic districts.

== Architectural works ==
- Bismarck High School, (Note: Designed in association with Edwin Hawley Hewitt of Minneapolis.) 800 N 8th St, Bismarck, North Dakota (1934–35 and 1962–63)
- Hettinger County Courthouse, 335 Pacific Ave, Mott, North Dakota (1934–36, NRHP 1985)
- New England Memorial Hall, 925 Main St, New England, North Dakota (1935–36)
- Valley City Municipal Auditorium, 320 Central Ave S, Valley City, North Dakota (1936–37, NRHP 2008)
- P. S. Berg Elementary School, 307 3rd Ave W, Dickinson, North Dakota (1949–50)
- George Francis Will house, (Note: A contributing property to the Bismarck Cathedral Area Historic District, NRHP-listed in 1980 and expanded in 1997.) 112 W Ave E, Bismarck, North Dakota (1949–50)
- Richholt Elementary School, 720 N 14th St, Bismarck, North Dakota (1950, demolished)
- Cowan Building, (Note: A contributing property to the Downtown Bismarck Historic District, NRHP-listed in 2001 and amended in 2012.) 401 E Broadway Ave, Bismarck, North Dakota (1954–55)
- Receiving and treatment center, North Dakota State Hospital, Jamestown, North Dakota (1954)
- Bismarck Junior College (former), (Note: For lack of space, the college, now Bismarck State College, moved to a new campus in 1961. This building is now a state office building.) 900 E Boulevard Ave, Bismarck, North Dakota (1955)
- Oakes Community Center, 124 S 5th St, Oakes, North Dakota (1955)
- Hughes Middle School (former), 806 N Washington St, Bismarck, North Dakota (1957–58)
- Kenmare Community Hospital, 317 1st Ave NW, Kenmare, North Dakota (1957)
- McCabe United Methodist Church, 1030 N 6th St, Bismarck, North Dakota (1957)
- North Dakota Governor's Residence, 1131 N 4th St, Bismarck, North Dakota (1959–60, demolished 2018)
- Veterans Memorial Public Library, 520 Ave A, Bismarck, North Dakota (1963, demolished)
- Terminal, Bismarck Municipal Airport, Bismarck, North Dakota (1965, demolished)
- Bismarck Event Center, 315 S 5th St, Bismarck, North Dakota (1967–69)
- Montana–Dakota Utilities Company Building, 400 N 4th St, Bismarck, North Dakota (1968)
- Trinity Lutheran Church, 502 N 4th St, Bismarck, North Dakota (1969)

== See also ==
- Van Horn-Ritterbush Architecture Records, State Historical Society of North Dakota.
