= Governor of North Dakota =

Head of government of North Dakota, US

- Seal of the governor of North Dakota

- Standard of the governor

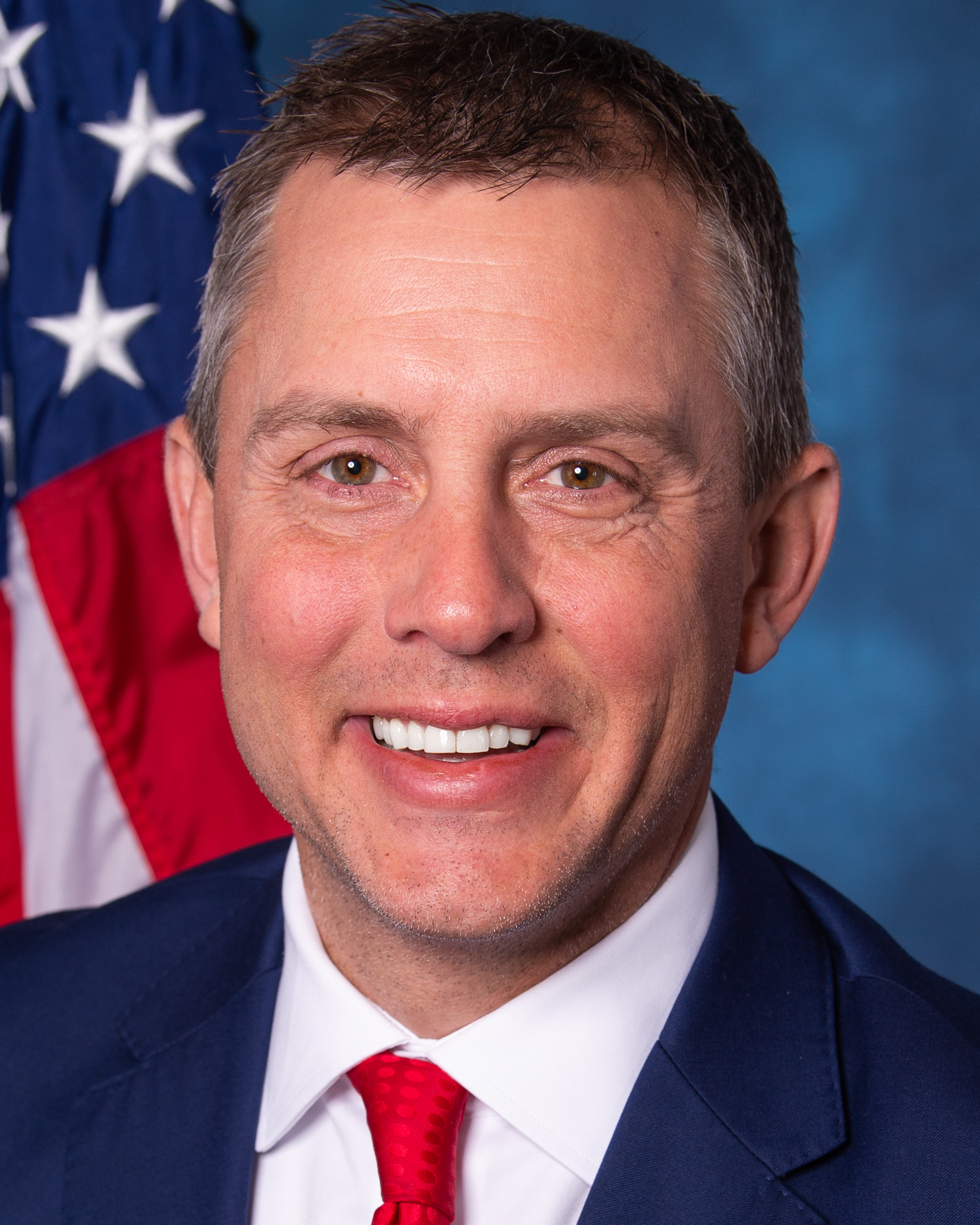
- Incumbent; Kelly Armstrong since December 15, 2024
- Government of North Dakota
- Style: Governor (informal); The Honorable (formal)
- Status: Head of state; Head of government
- Residence: North Dakota Governor's Residence
- Term length: 4 years, renewable once
- Inaugural holder: John Miller
- Formation: November 20, 1889
- Succession: Line of succession
- Deputy: Lieutenant Governor of North Dakota
- Salary: $135,360 (2020)
- Website: Official website

The governor of North Dakota is the head of government of North Dakota and serves as the commander-in-chief of the state's military forces.

The Constitution of North Dakota specifies that "the executive power is vested in the governor" in Section 1. Section 7 indicates that "the governor is the chief executive of the state. The governor shall have the responsibility to see that the state's business is well administered and that its laws are faithfully executed."

== Eligibility ==
According to Article 5 of the constitution, to be eligible to hold an elective office as governor, a person must be a qualified elector in North Dakota, must be at least thirty years of age on the day of the election, and must have been a resident of the state for the five years preceding election to office.

== Dates of party conventions and gubernatorial nominations ==
The dates that political parties meet to nominate official candidates for state offices varies by party.

== Dates of general elections ==
The dates of the general election for the office of governor are set by the North Dakota legislative assembly. Traditionally, the general election date coincides with the U.S. presidential election which is the first Tuesday of November in even years, every four years (except when the first Tuesday falls on November 1; in that case, the general election is held on November 8).

The next gubernatorial election in North Dakota is slated for November 7, 2028.

== Current governor ==
The current governor of North Dakota is Republican Kelly Armstrong. He became governor on December 15, 2024.

== Governor and lieutenant governor elected together ==
According to the state constitution, the governor and the lieutenant governor must be elected on a joint ballot, or single ticket. In North Dakota, each candidate for governor appears printed on the ballot with the candidate for lieutenant governor of the same political party.

A single vote is cast for both offices; no other option is available to the voter. Therefore, a voter may not choose a single candidate for governor from one political party and a single candidate for lieutenant governor from a competing party.

== Additional gubernatorial rights, responsibilities and positions ==
In addition to his role leading the executive branch offices, the governor has the right to sign or veto laws and to call the Legislative Assembly into emergency session.

The governor is also, by statute, chairman of the North Dakota Industrial Commission.

== Length and dates of term ==
A governor is elected by statewide popular vote to a 4-year term.

North Dakota law specifies that a regular term of an elected governor shall commence on December 15 following the November election in an even year, for a term of precisely four years, ending on December 15 four years after the inauguration of that person.

== Date of inauguration, exceptions and inaugural celebrations ==
The standard date of inauguration to the office of Governor of North Dakota is December 15 following the even-year general election.

Thus, the next scheduled inauguration of the governor will be held on December 15, 2028, for the successful candidate chosen at the November 2028 general election.

Other dates for the regularly scheduled inaugurations were mandated at various times, primarily dates in late December following the general election and several in January of the year following the general election.

There have been cases where the governor of North Dakota was inaugurated on other dates, due to the vacancy of the office of governor. These have included the resignation of the governor, the death in office of a governor, and in one instance, the judicial removal because of a felony conviction of a governor (William Langer; his conviction was later overturned and he was elected to another term).

Inaugural balls and related celebrations have been most often celebrated on the dates of gubernatorial inaugurations.

Although the current governor, Kelly Armstrong, was first inaugurated on December 15, 2024, the formal inaugural celebration was held in January 2025. The decision to conduct the celebration at a later date was made to avoid interference with the busy holiday schedules of many celebrants in December.

== Gubernatorial term limits ==
There was initially no limit to the number of terms a governor may serve if elected, until November 2022, when voters approved an amendment to the North Dakota Constitution that established a lifetime limit of two four-year terms for the office of governor. The amendment only applies to individuals elected after the approval of the amendment.

The longest-serving North Dakota governor was William L. Guy (1961–1973), who served four terms, two being for a two-year term and two being for a four-year term, for a total of 12 years in office. John Hoeven holds the record as the second longest-serving North Dakota governor (2000–2010).

== Non-sequential terms ==
It is possible for a governor to serve non-sequential terms. William Langer is the only one who has done so.

== Official residence ==
The official residence of the governor is the North Dakota Governor's Residence in Bismarck.

== Timeline ==
Timeline of North Dakota governors

== See also ==
- North Dakota
- Lieutenant Governor of North Dakota
- North Dakota State Legislature
