= North Dakota Governor's Residence =

Building in North Dakota, United States

Coordinates: 46.817947°N 100.785073°W

Governor's Residence of North Dakota
- Interactive map of the Governor's Residence of North Dakota area

General information
- Type: House
- Architectural style: Prairie School Style
- Location: 1151 N 4th St, Bismarck, North Dakota
- Construction started: 2016
- Completed: 2018
- Governing body: Friends of the Residence

Technical details
- Floor area: 13,700 sq ft (1,270 m^{2})

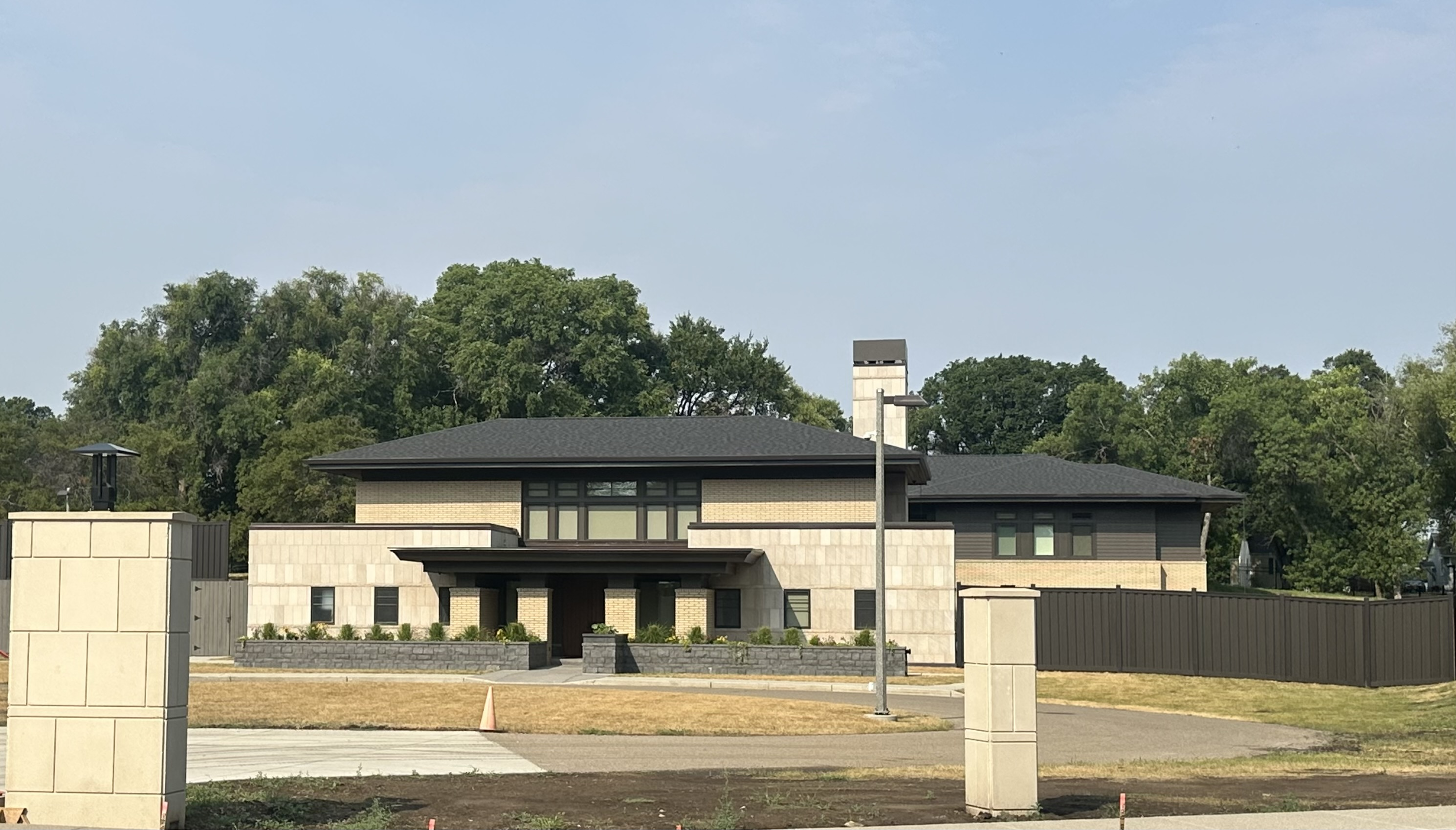
North Dakota Governor's Residence

The North Dakota Governor's Residence is the home of the governor of North Dakota. The current residence is on the southwest corner of the North Dakota State Capitol grounds in Bismarck, and is the third official residence built for North Dakota's governors.

== Historical Governors' Mansion ==
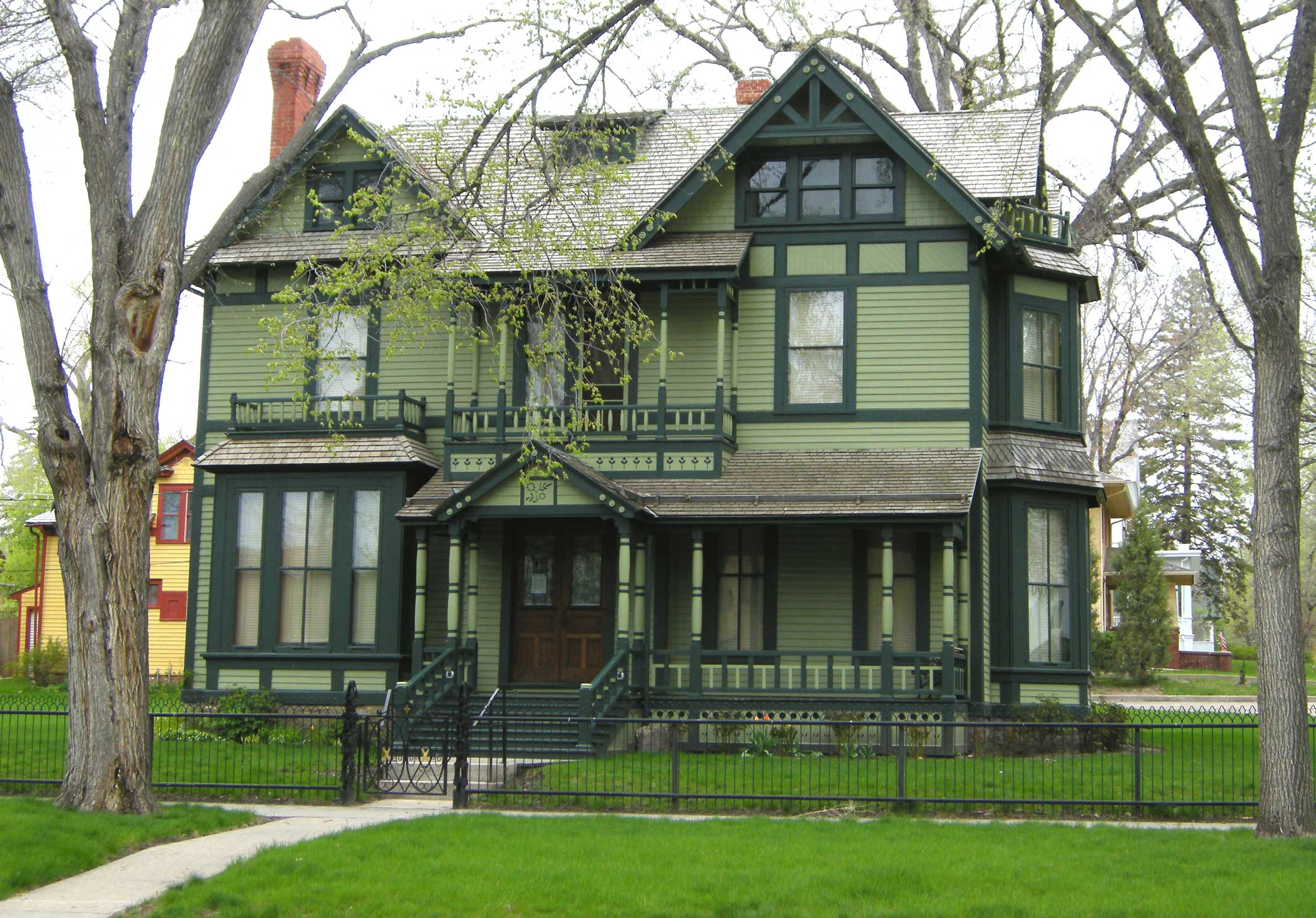
Original governor's residence, now a museum

The original governor's mansion was built in 1884 as a private home for Bismarck businessman Asa Fisher. Fisher homesteaded in Edwinton (Bismarck) in 1872 and made his fortune in banking, real estate and liquor sales. In 1893, the house was sold to the state for $5000. The house was the governor's residence from 1893 to 1960 and was the home of twenty North Dakota governors. In 1975, the State Legislature passed House Bill 1315 which transferred ownership to the State Historical Society of North Dakota. The house was renovated to look as it did in 1893 and opened to the public as a North Dakota State Historic Site in 1983.

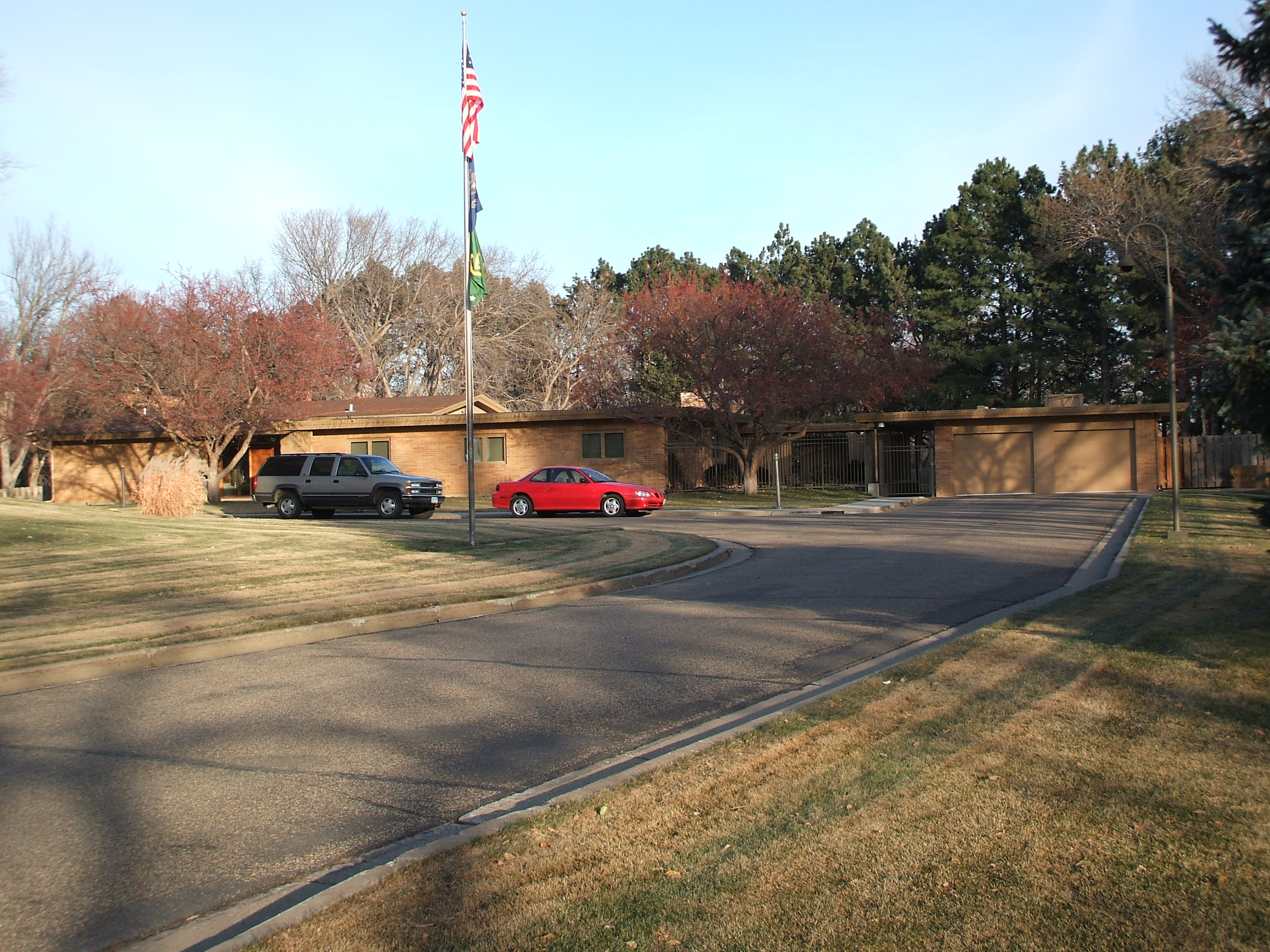
Former North Dakota Governor's Residence

== Former Governor's Residence ==
In 1955, the North Dakota legislature approved House Bill 761 providing $200,000 for a new governor's residence to be built because the current mansion was in a state of disrepair. The original architects were Leonhard & Askew of Bismarck, but when their design proved too costly, the state replaced them with Ritterbush Brothers. Construction started in 1959 and was completed in 1960. Governor John Davis was the last governor to live in the old 1884 mansion and the first to live in this new residence. Of the governors that were in office during the existence of this second residence, Allen I. Olson is the only one that did not move in, as he felt it was too small for his family. In 2000, a remodeling of most of the home was done. On May 18, 2018, the 1960s-era governor's mansion was demolished after no bidders offered to purchase and move the building. The site of the former mansion will be replaced with green space alongside the current mansion.

== Current Governor's Residence ==
The 2015 North Dakota Legislative Assembly passed Senate Bill 2304, which authorized up to $4 million in special funds (for use on the Capitol grounds only) along with up to $1 million in private contributions for the demolition of the current Governor's residence and the construction of a new home on the same site (on the southwest corner of the Capitol grounds). The former residence was found to have major structural, safety, and ADA compliance concerns, and estimates to repair the home came in at nearly $3 million, without addressing handicap accessibility issues. Instead, the legislature determined new construction of a home, along with a visitor's facility for hosting events, would be a more responsible use of funding.

Governor Jack Dalrymple signed SB 2304 on April 29, 2015. Construction groundwork began in September 2016. After several delays and budget increases, the first family moved into the new residence in March 2018.
