= Johnny Klein =

American drummer

John A. Klein Jr. (June 4, 1918 – January 31, 1997) was an American musician who played drums for the Lawrence Welk orchestra from 1951 to 1976 and on The Lawrence Welk Show from 1955 to 1976. He was also Welk's second cousin.

Drummer Johnny Klein of the Lawrence Welk Show

Born in Strasburg, North Dakota, Klein was the son of German-Russian parents and the oldest of five children. It was during his early years that he took up music, especially the drums, which he played with several area bands. Upon graduating from high school in 1936, Johnny first enrolled at the University of North Dakota. Later he enrolled at the University of Missouri, where he graduated with both a Bachelor of Arts and master's degree in Music Education. He also served in the Army during World War II.

In 1951, while Klein was studying for his master's degree in Columbia, Missouri, Welk and his orchestra came to St. Louis, Missouri for an engagement. Welk encouraged his cousin to try out for his band, which he accepted.

For the next twenty-five years, in addition to being featured drummer, Klein was the band's equipment manager and the driver of the band truck while out on tour. However, ill health due to a bleeding ulcer forced him to step down full-time in 1976. After a recovering, he served as Welk's music librarian with the organization. He also continued to perform as well, often playing for the Sunday Swing at the Welk Resort in Escondido with a group called the Journeymen and with other clubs until his retirement in the 1990s.

He died in 1997 after a brief illness in Torrance, California.
