= Downtown Bismarck Historic District =

Historic district in North Dakota, United States

- U.S. National Register of Historic Places
- U.S. Historic district
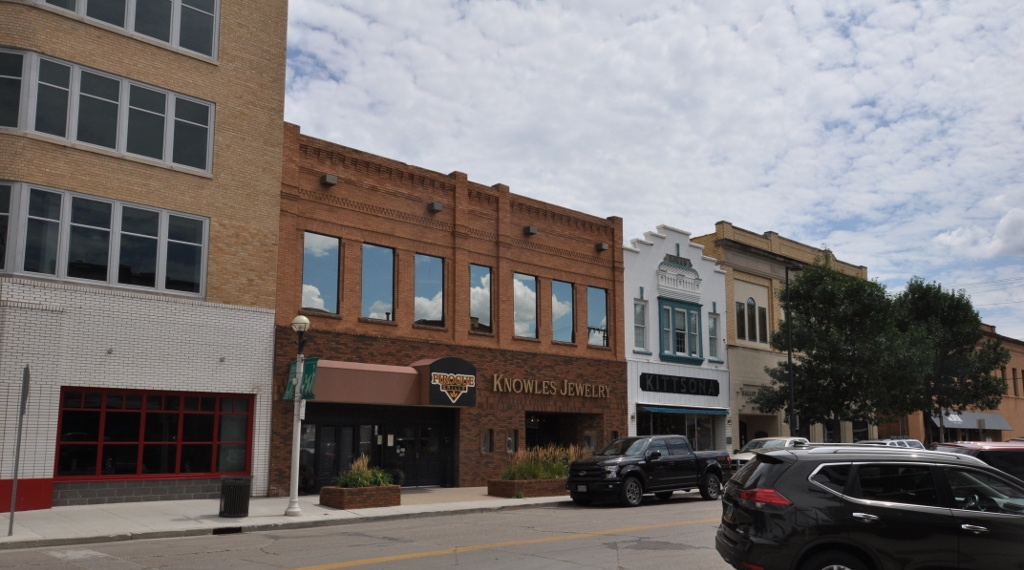
- Historic District in 2017

- Location within North Dakota Location within the United States
- Location: Roughly bounded by Broadway and Thayer Aves., 5th St., Burlington and Santa Fe RR corridor, Washington and 2nd Sts., Bismarck, North Dakota
- Coordinates: 46°48′12″N 100°47′23″W
- Area: 40 acres (16 ha)
- Built: 1872
- Architect: Van Horn, Arthur; et al.
- Architectural style: Late Victorian, Late 19th and 20th Century Revivals, et al.
- NRHP reference No.: 01001188
- Added to NRHP: October 28, 2001

The Downtown Bismarck Historic District is a 40-acre (16 ha) historic district in Bismarck, North Dakota that was listed on the National Register of Historic Places in 2001. It includes work by architect Arthur Van Horn and others. The listing included 40 contributing buildings.
