= Emmons County Courthouse =

- U.S. National Register of Historic Places
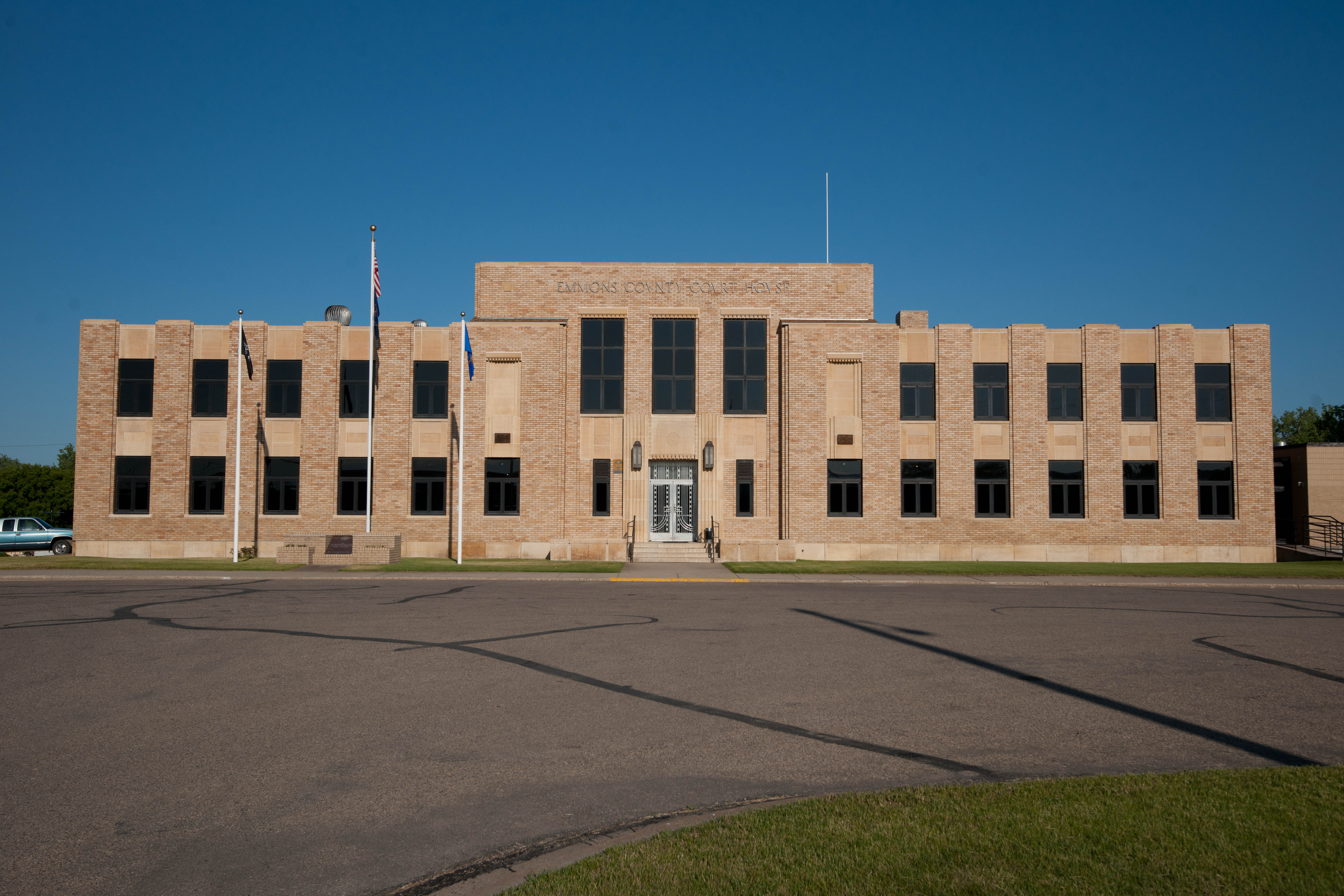
- The courthouse in 2009

- Location within North Dakota Location within the United States
- Location: In Linton, North Dakota
- Coordinates: 46.26703°N 100.23665°W
- Built: 1934
- Architect: J. Howard Ness
- Architectural style: Art Deco-Art Moderne
- MPS: Buechner and Orth Courthouses in North Dakota TR
- NRHP reference No.: 85002982
- Added to NRHP: November 14, 1985

Emmons County Courthouse in Linton, North Dakota was built in 1934. It is notable for being the first Works Progress Administration project granted in the state. Seven courthouses in the state were completed as part of this program. The Emmons County Courthouse is also one of eight Art Deco courthouses in North Dakota. The Courthouse was entered into the National Register of Historic Places on 14 November 1985.
