= Willows Hotel =

- U.S. National Register of Historic Places
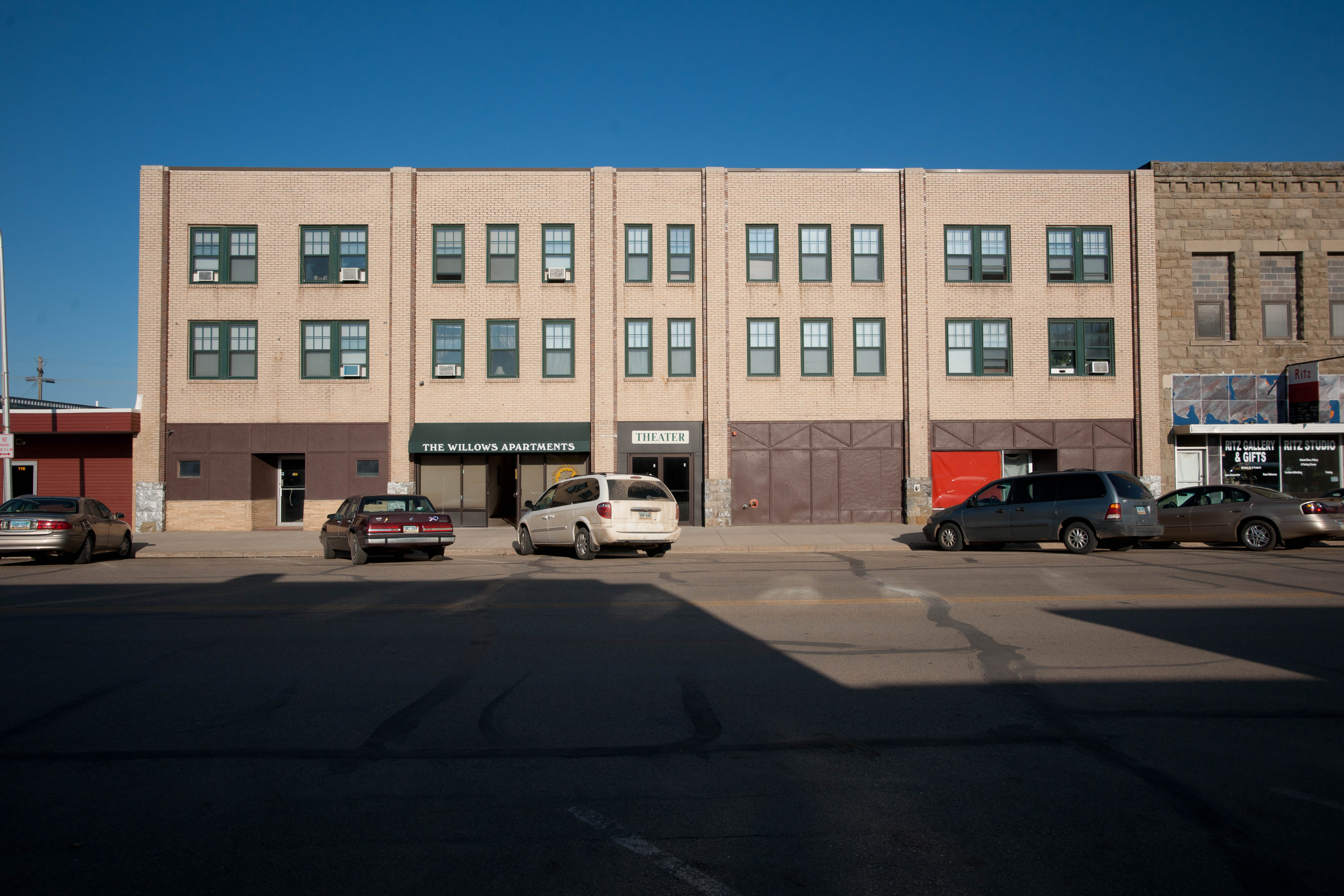

- Location within North Dakota Location within the United States
- Location: 112 S. Broadway, Linton, North Dakota
- Coordinates: 46°15′59″N 100°13′58″W
- Area: less than one acre
- Built: 1922
- Architect: Van Horn & Ritterbush Brothers
- Architectural style: Early Commercial
- NRHP reference No.: 96000522
- Added to NRHP: May 2, 1996

The Willows Hotel at 112 S. Broadway in Linton, North Dakota, United States, was built in 1922. It was listed on the National Register of Historic Places in 1996. Also known as the Hogue Building, it is in Early Commercial architecture style.

According to its NRHP nomination, "Willows Hotel is an early North Dakota example of a commercial structure that was the product of international experimentation, using the reinforced concrete method of construction." It was the city of Linton's first fireproof commercial building.
