= Ludwig and Christina Welk Homestead =

Historic farm in North Dakota, United States

- U.S. National Register of Historic Places
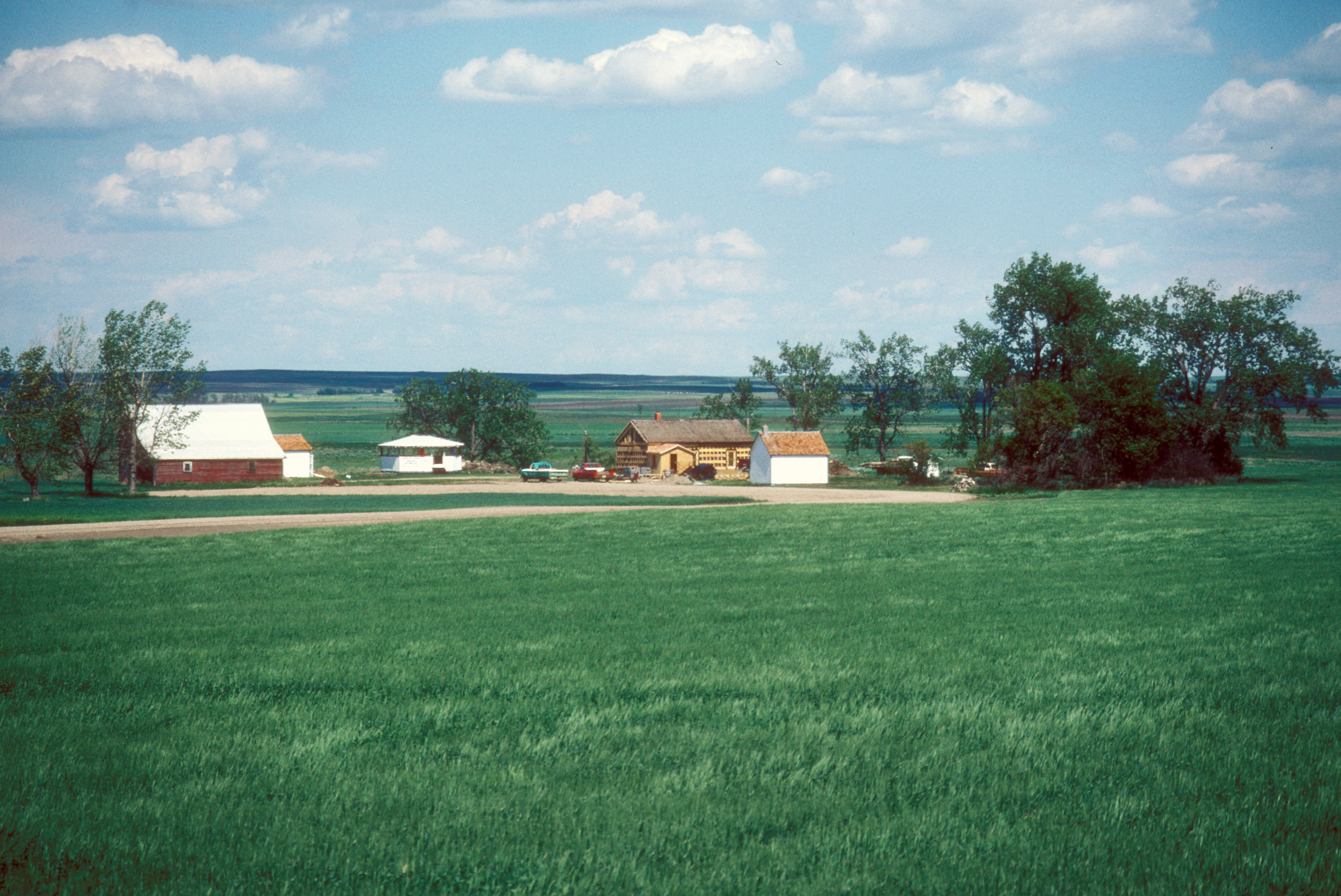

- Location within North Dakota Location within the United States
- Nearest city: Strasburg, North Dakota
- Coordinates: 46°9′1″N 100°12′27″W
- Built: 1893
- Architect: Welk, John and Ludwig
- NRHP reference No.: 93001102
- Added to NRHP: October 28, 1993

The Ludwig and Christina Welk Homestead built in 1893 is an historic farm house located at 845 88th Street, South East in Strasburg, North Dakota. It is also known as the Lawrence Welk Birthplace, the Mike Welk Farm and ND SITS 32 EM 46. Here on March 11, 1903, noted American musician, accordionist, bandleader, and television impresario Lawrence Welk was born to Ludwig and Christina Welk, who were German-speaking Roman Catholics from Alsace-Lorraine by way of Odesa, Ukraine (then part of the Russian Empire). On October 28, 1993, the homestead was added to the National Register of Historic Places.

The Lawrence Welk Birthplace, officially called the Ludwig and Christina Welk Farmstead, has been restored and is run by local volunteers including Lawrence Welk's niece Edna Schwab. Although Welk donated to other local efforts, surprisingly he specified that none of his money be used for the restoration of his birthplace.
