= Old St. Mary's Cemetery, Wrought-Iron Cross Site =

Historic Cemetery in Emmons County, North Dakota, US

Coordinates: 46°01′43″N 100°01′34″W

- U.S. National Register of Historic Places
- Location within North Dakota Location within the United States
- Nearest city: Hague, North Dakota
- Area: less than one acre
- Built by: Multiple
- Architectural style: Wrought-iron cross
- MPS: German-Russian Wrought-Iron Cross Sites in Central North Dakota MPS
- NRHP reference No.: 89001679
- Added to NRHP: October 23, 1989

The Old St. Mary's Cemetery, Wrought-Iron Cross Site near Hague, North Dakota, United States, is a historic site that was listed on the National Register of Historic Places in 1989. It includes wrought-iron crosses. The listing included 55 contributing objects.

The National Register database listing for this site does not identify any specific blacksmith whose work is present here. However, there were a number of "German-Russian blacksmiths in central North Dakota" who developed individual styles in their crosses and whose "work was known for miles around them."

== See also ==
- St. Mary's Church Non-Contiguous Historic District, also NRHP-listed
