= Wrought-iron cross sites of Holy Trinity Cemetery =

Historic cemetery in Emmons County, North Dakota, US

- Holy Trinity Cemetery, Wrought-Iron Cross Site A Holy Trinity Cemetery, Wrought-Iron Cross Site B Holy Trinity Cemetery, Wrought-Iron Cross Site C Holy Trinity Cemetery, Wrought-Iron Cross Site D
- U.S. National Register of Historic Places
- Nearest city: Strasburg, North Dakota
- Area: less than one acre
- Built: 1912 (Site C)
- Built by: Schneider, Deport; Schneider, Jake (Site A); Marquardt, Simon; Schmidt, Michael (Site B)
- Architectural style: Wrought-iron cross, Other
- MPS: German-Russian Wrought-Iron Cross Sites in Central North Dakota MPS
- NRHP reference No.: 89001692, 89001693, 89001694, 89001695
- Added to NRHP: October 23, 1989

Four historic sites within the Holy Trinity Cemetery near Strasburg, North Dakota, United States, identified as Holy Trinity Cemetery, Wrought-Iron Cross Site A, as Holy Trinity Cemetery, Wrought-Iron Cross Site B, and likewise for Site C and Site D, were listed on the National Register of Historic Places in 1989. They include wrought-iron crosses. The listing for Site A included 9 contributing objects and work by Deport Schneider and Jake Schneider. The listing for Site B included 3 contributing objects and work by Simon Marquardt and Michael Schmidt. Site C included just one contributing object, dating from 1912. Site D included just one.

Tibertius ("Deport") Schneider (1877–1941), of Emmons County, Simon Marquardt, of Zeeland and Michael Schmidt, of Hague, were among a number of "German-Russian blacksmiths in central North Dakota" who developed individual styles in their crosses and whose "work was known for miles around them."
