= State Training School Historic District (Mandan, North Dakota) =

Historic district in North Dakota, United States

- Formerly listed on the U.S. National Register of Historic Places
- U.S. Historic district
- Location within North Dakota Location within the United States
- Nearest city: Mandan, North Dakota
- Coordinates: 46°48′32″N 100°54′49″W
- Area: 7 acres (2.8 ha)
- Built: 1901
- Built by: Salzmann, E. E., builder
- Architect: Van Horn and Ritterbush
- Architectural style: Mission/Spanish Revival, Late Gothic Revival
- NRHP reference No.: 95001549

Significant dates
- Added to NRHP: January 19, 1996
- Removed from NRHP: July 16, 2018

The State Training School Historic District, also known as the North Dakota State Reform School, North Dakota State Industrial School, and the North Dakota State Training School, was a reform school opened on May 13, 1903 located near Mandan, North Dakota, United States.

== History ==
Plans for building a reform school to serve North Dakota were proposed by 1901. In prior years, juvenile offenders were sent to South Dakota. Original plans consisted of converting Fort Lincoln into a school, but instead a 40-acre parcel of land outside of Mandan was chosen as the site for the school. The school was completed in 1903. The first group of students consisted of 21 boys and three girls.

In the early days of the school, daily life for youths consisted of animal husbandry, where they raised animals such as turkeys, chickens, cows, and pigs.

In 1912, Joseph Devine was named superintendent of the school by governor Louis B. Hanna. In 1916, the school was renovated. Improvements included a new kitchen and repairs to the basement of the main building, repairs to the silo, and a new chicken coop. The cost of this renovation was $3,000.

In the 1920s, the name of the school was changed to the North Dakota State Training School. In 1922, it had 110 juveniles under its care, 88 boys and 22 girls.

Devine was the superintendent of the school until 1923, when he was appointed commissioner of immigration by Governor Ragnvald Nestos. He was replaced by William F. McClelland, who had previously served as the superintendent of a boys' school in Freeville, New York.

In 1924, the school was one of two reform schools in the United States to offer high school curriculum. The first groups of students graduated that June.

McClelland resigned from his position as superintendent in June 1941.

By the 1940s, the school began to focus more on rehabilitating juveniles.

On August 15, 1957, Thomas R. Crouse became superintendent of the school.

In 1963, the school had about 74 employees. The average stay for a student was 14 months. By 1970s, farming had been outlawed as part of treatment.

By 2003, the school population was 90 students from the ages of 12 to 19. The superintendent was Darrell Nitschke. By this time, the campus had expanded to include cottages for housing, classrooms, a gym, a chapel, cafeteria, and an indoor swimming pool.

The school was listed on the National Register of Historic Places in 1996. The listing included six contributing buildings on 7 acres (2.8 ha). It was delisted in 2018.
