= Wrought-iron cross sites of St. Mary's Cemetery =

- St. Mary's Cemetery, Wrought-Iron Cross Site A St. Mary's Cemetery, Wrought-Iron Cross Site B St. Mary's Cemetery, Wrought-Iron Cross Site C
- U.S. National Register of Historic Places
- Nearest city: Hague, North Dakota
- Area: less than one acre
- Built: 1921 (Site B)
- Built by: Schmidt, Michael (Site A, Site B); Keller, Paul (Site C)
- Architectural style: Wrought-iron cross
- MPS: German-Russian Wrought-Iron Cross Sites in Central North Dakota MPS
- NRHP reference No.: 89001676, 89001677, 89001678
- Added to NRHP: October 23, 1989

Three historic sites within the St. Mary's Cemetery near Hague, North Dakota, United States, identified as St. Mary's Cemetery, Wrought-Iron Cross Site A, and St. Mary's Cemetery, Wrought-Iron Cross Site B, and St. Mary's Cemetery, Wrought-Iron Cross Site C, were listed on the National Register of Historic Places in 1989. They include wrought-iron crosses. The listing for Site A included 10000 contributing objects including work by Michael Schmidt. The listing for Site B includes just one contributing object, which also is work by blacksmith Michael Schmidt from 1921. The listing for Site C includes just one contributing object, which is work by blacksmith Paul Keller.

Michael Schmidt and Paul Keller, both of Hague were among a number of "German-Russian blacksmiths in central North Dakota" who developed individual styles in their crosses and whose "work was known for miles around them."
