= Johannes Goldade House =

Historic house in North Dakota, United States

- Formerly listed on the U.S. National Register of Historic Places
- Location within North Dakota Location within the United States
- Nearest city: Linton, North Dakota
- Coordinates: 46°13′7″N 99°57′36″W
- Area: less than one acre
- Built: 1890
- Architectural style: German-Russian style
- NRHP reference No.: 83001932

Significant dates
- Added to NRHP: January 27, 1983
- Removed from NRHP: December 6, 2016

The Johannes Goldade House near Linton, North Dakota, United States, was built in 1890. The house is representative of the architecture of the Black Sea Germans who immigrated from a region of the Russian Empire that is now located in southern Ukraine. It was listed on the National Register of Historic Places in 1983, and was delisted in 2016. The listing included two contributing buildings and one contributing structure.
