= Strasburg, North Dakota =

- City
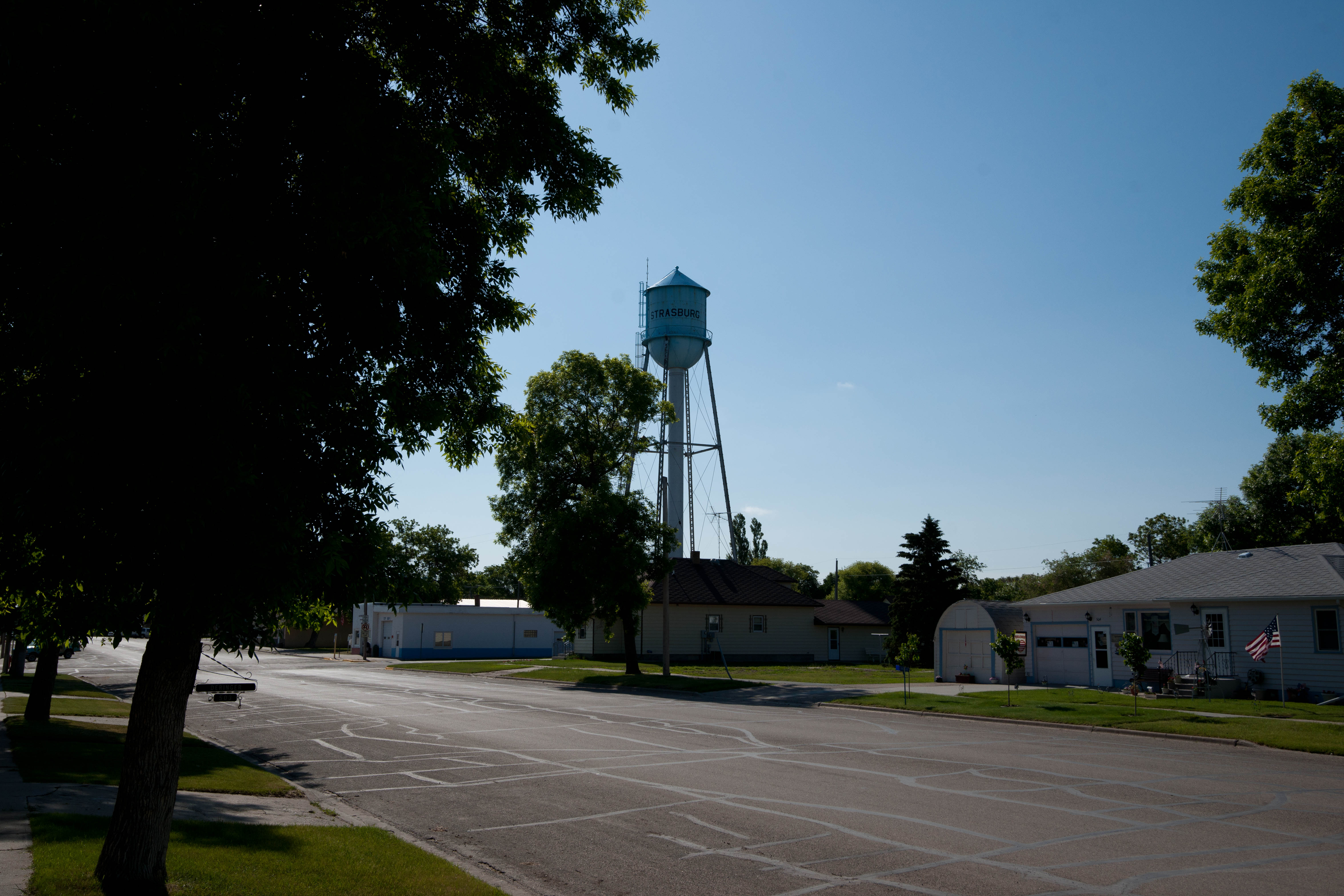
- Strasburg

- Location of Strasburg, North Dakota
- Coordinates: 46°08′02″N 100°09′40″W
- Country: United States
- State: North Dakota
- County: Emmons
- Founded: 1902

Area
  - Total: 0.29 sq mi (0.76 km^{2})
  - Land: 0.29 sq mi (0.75 km^{2})
  - Water: 0 sq mi (0.00 km^{2})
- Elevation: 1,811 ft (552 m)

Population (2020)
  - Total: 379
  - Estimate (2022): 369
  - Density: 1,300.3/sq mi (502.05/km^{2})
- Time zone: UTC-6 (Central (CST))
  - Summer (DST): UTC-5 (CDT)
- ZIP code: 58573
- Area code: 701
- FIPS code: 38-76500
- GNIS feature ID: 1036288
- Website: strasburg.org

Strasburg is a historically German-speaking city in Emmons County, North Dakota, United States. The population was 379 at the 2020 census. Strasburg was founded in 1902.

== History ==
Strasburg was laid out in 1902 when a spur of the Chicago, Milwaukee, St. Paul Railroad was extended to that point. The city was named after Straßburg, Ukraine, a town founded by 18th century German immigrants in South Russia and now (with all the Germans expelled) renamed Kuchurhan, Rozdilna Raion. Strassburg was, in turn, named for the historic German city of Strassburg in Alsace, France. A post office has been in operation at Strasburg since 1903.

=== Historic sites ===
Historic sites in or near Strasburg include Tirsbol Cemetery, Wrought-Iron Cross Site, Wrought-iron cross sites of Holy Trinity Cemetery (Strasburg, North Dakota), and Ludwig and Christina Welk Homestead.

The historic Blessed Trinity Roman Catholic Church (formerly Holy Trinity) near the city contains works by the artist Berthold Imhoff.

== Geography ==
According to the United States Census Bureau, the city has a total area of 0.30 square miles (0.78 km^{2}), all land.

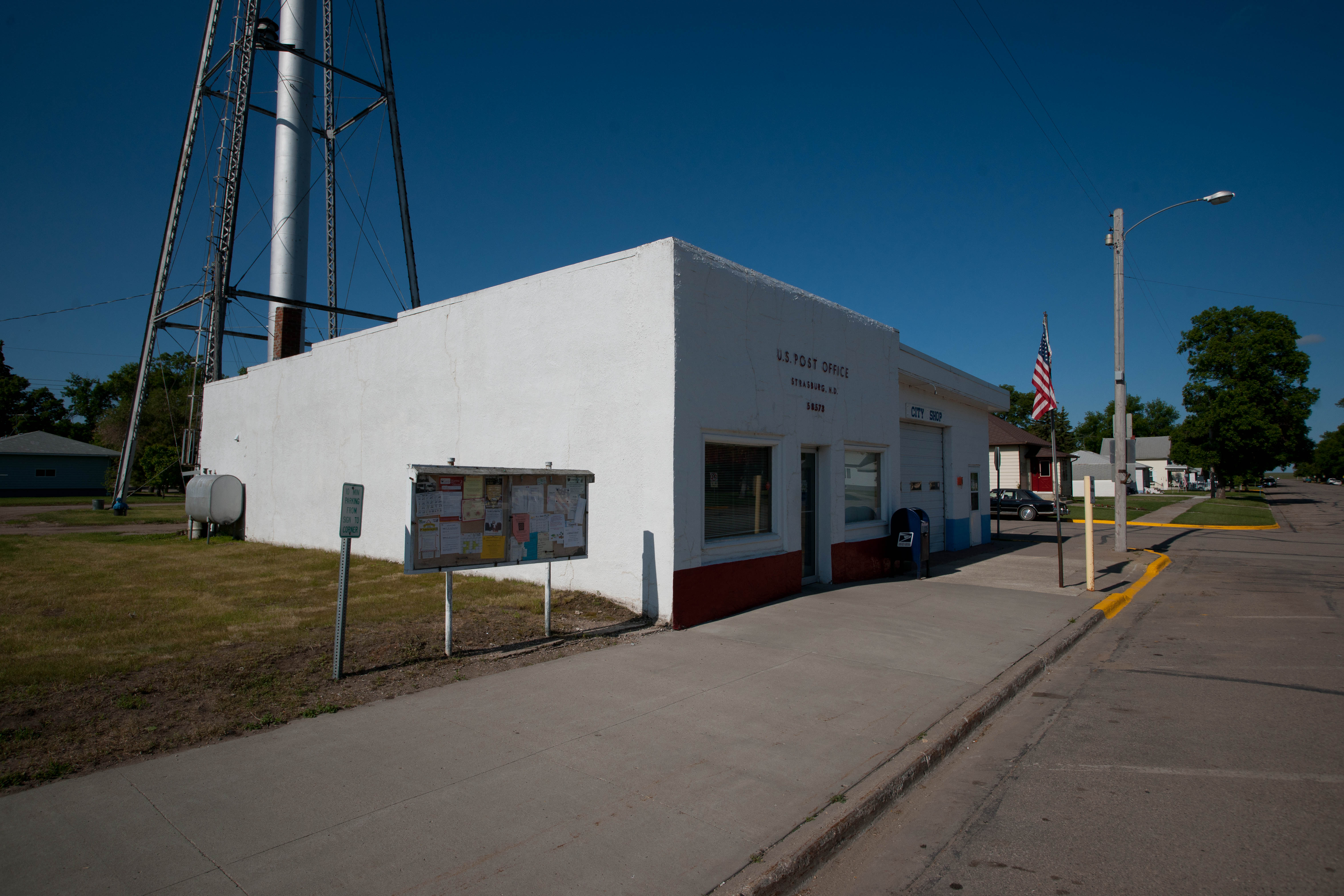
U.S. Post office in Strasburg

== Demographics ==
Historical population
Census	Pop.	Note	%±
1910	273		—
1920	653		139.2%
1930	695		6.4%
1940	994		43.0%
1950	733		−26.3%
1960	612		−16.5%
1970	642		4.9%
1980	623		−3.0%
1990	553		−11.2%
2000	549		−0.7%
2010	409		−25.5%
2020	379		−7.3%
2022 (est.)	369		−2.6%
U.S. Decennial Census; 2020 Census

=== 2010 census ===
As of the census of 2010, there were 409 people, 191 households, and 95 families residing in the city. The population density was 1,363.3 inhabitants per square mile (526.4/km^{2}). There were 224 housing units at an average density of 746.7 per square mile (288.3/km^{2}). The racial makeup of the city was 99.8% White and 0.2% from two or more races. Hispanic or Latino of any race were 0.2% of the population.

There were 191 households, of which 15.2% had children under the age of 18 living with them, 40.8% were married couples living together, 6.3% had a female householder with no husband present, 2.6% had a male householder with no wife present, and 50.3% were non-families. 45.0% of all households were made up of individuals, and 25.2% had someone living alone who was 65 years of age or older. The average household size was 1.86 and the average family size was 2.57.

The median age in the city was 60.8 years. 14.7% of residents were under the age of 18; 3.6% were between the ages of 18 and 24; 9.7% were from 25 to 44; 26.7% were from 45 to 64; and 45.2% were 65 years of age or older. The gender makeup of the city was 46.2% male and 53.8% female.

=== 2000 census ===
As of the census of 2000, there were 549 people, 216 households, and 136 families residing in Strasburg. The population density was 1,823.0 inhabitants per square mile (703.9/km^{2}). There were 245 housing units at an average density of 813.5 per square mile (314.1/km^{2}). The racial makeup of the town was 96.72% White, 0.18% Native American, 1.28% Pacific Islander, 1.82% from other races. Hispanic or Latino of any race were 4.01% of the population.

There were 216 households, out of which 21.8% had children under the age of 18 living with them, 54.2% were married couples living together, 7.9% had a female householder with no husband present, and 36.6% were non-families. 33.3% of all households were made up of individuals, and 21.3% had someone living alone who was 65 years of age or older. The average household size was 2.21 and the average family size was 2.81.

The population of Strasburg was spread out, with 20.0% under the age of 18, 3.5% from 18 to 24, 16.9% from 25 to 44, 19.5% from 45 to 64, and 40.1% who were 65 years of age or older. The median age was 55 years. For every 100 females, there were 81.8 males. For every 100 females age 18 and over, there were 79.9 males.

The median income for a household was $25,417, and the median income for a family was $34,688. Males had a median income of $26,750 versus $16,719 for females. The per capita income for Strasburg was $15,186. About 7.8% of families and 15.2% of the population were below the poverty line, including 8.1% of those under age 18 and 35.0% of those age 65 or over.

== Education ==
It is in the Strasburg Public School District.

== Notable people ==
- Rosalind Gefre, religious sister
- Johnny Klein, drummer for Lawrence Welk Orchestra
- Toby Roth, U.S. Congressman from Wisconsin
- Claudia Meier Volk, Minnesota state legislator and nurse
- Lawrence Welk, musician and TV personality (The Lawrence Welk Show)
