= Hague, North Dakota =

City in Emmons County, North Dakota, United States

Hague
- City
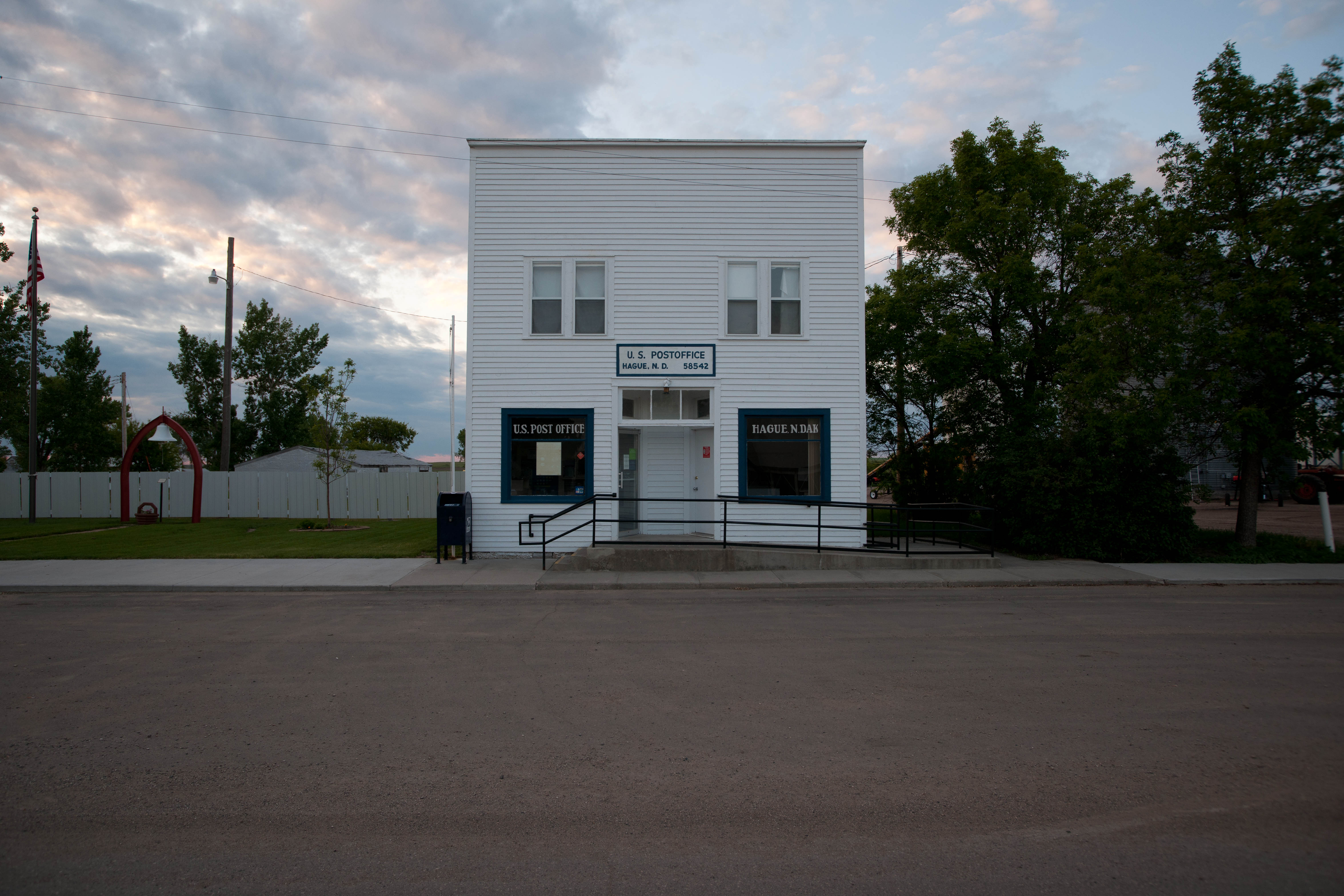
- Post office in Hague, June 2009

- Location of Hague, North Dakota
- Coordinates: 46°01′44″N 99°59′57″W
- Country: United States
- State: North Dakota
- County: Emmons
- Founded: 1902

Area
  - Total: 0.26 sq mi (0.68 km^{2})
  - Land: 0.26 sq mi (0.68 km^{2})
  - Water: 0 sq mi (0.00 km^{2})
- Elevation: 2,000 ft (600 m)

Population (2020)
  - Total: 70
  - Estimate (2022): 68
  - Density: 266.4/sq mi (102.85/km^{2})
- Time zone: UTC–6 (Central (CST))
  - Summer (DST): UTC–5 (CDT)
- ZIP Code: 58542
- Area code: 701
- FIPS code: 38-34180
- GNIS feature ID: 1036071

Hague is a city in Emmons County, North Dakota, United States. The population was 70 at the 2020 census. Hague was founded in 1902.

== History ==
Hague was laid out in 1902 when the railroad was extended to that point. The community took its name from The Hague, in the Netherlands. A post office has been in operation at Hague since 1902.

=== Historic sites ===
Several historic sites in or near Hague are listed on the National Register of Historic Places: Old St. Mary's Cemetery, Wrought-Iron Cross Site, Wrought-iron cross sites of St. Aloysius Cemetery (Hague, North Dakota), and Wrought-iron cross sites of St. Mary's Cemetery (Hague, North Dakota). St. Mary's Catholic Church in Hague features works by artist Count Berthold von Imhoff.

== Geography ==
According to the United States Census Bureau, the city has a total area of 0.27 square miles (0.70 km^{2}), all land.

== Demographics ==
Historical population
Census	Pop.	Note	%±
1910	183		—
1920	315		72.1%
1930	364		15.6%
1940	442		21.4%
1950	328		−25.8%
1960	197		−39.9%
1970	146		−25.9%
1980	127		−13.0%
1990	109		−14.2%
2000	91		−16.5%
2010	71		−22.0%
2020	70		−1.4%
2022 (est.)	68		−2.9%
U.S. Decennial Census; 2020 Census

=== 2010 census ===
As of the census of 2010, there were 71 people, 35 households, and 22 families residing in the city. The population density was 263.0 inhabitants per square mile (101.5/km^{2}). There were 51 housing units at an average density of 188.9 per square mile (72.9/km^{2}). The racial makeup of the city was 100.0% White. Hispanic or Latino of any race were 1.4% of the population.

There were 35 households, of which 20.0% had children under the age of 18 living with them, 54.3% were married couples living together, 2.9% had a female householder with no husband present, 5.7% had a male householder with no wife present, and 37.1% were non-families. 28.6% of all households were made up of individuals, and 25.7% had someone living alone who was 65 years of age or older. The average household size was 2.03 and the average family size was 2.45.

The median age in the city was 60.5 years. 16.9% of residents were under the age of 18; 0.0% were between the ages of 18 and 24; 18.2% were from 25 to 44; 23.9% were from 45 to 64; and 40.8% were 65 years of age or older. The gender makeup of the city was 52.1% male and 47.9% female.

=== 2000 census ===
As of the census of 2000, there were 91 people, 43 households, and 28 families residing in the city. The population density was 330.4 inhabitants per square mile (127.6/km^{2}). There were 53 housing units at an average density of 192.4 per square mile (74.3/km^{2}). The racial makeup of the city was 96.70% White, 1.10% African American and 2.20% Native American. Hispanic or Latino of any race were 1.10% of the population.

There were 43 households, out of which 16.3% had children under the age of 18 living with them, 53.5% were married couples living together, 9.3% had a female householder with no husband present, and 32.6% were non-families. 32.6% of all households were made up of individuals, and 16.3% had someone living alone who was 65 years of age or older. The average household size was 2.12 and the average family size was 2.59.

In the city, the population was spread out, with 17.6% under the age of 18, 25.3% from 25 to 44, 14.3% from 45 to 64, and 42.9% who were 65 years of age or older. The median age was 56 years. For every 100 females, there were 85.7 males. For every 100 females age 18 and over, there were 87.5 males.

The median income for a household in the city was $24,688, and the median income for a family was $27,500. Males had a median income of $20,417 versus $10,625 for females. The per capita income for the city was $13,048. There were 5.9% of families and 14.4% of the population living below the poverty line, including 40.0% of under eighteens and 7.7% of those over 64.

== Education ==
It is in the Strasburg Public School District.

== Climate ==
This climatic region is typified by large seasonal temperature differences, with warm to hot (and often humid) summers and cold (sometimes severely cold) winters. According to the Köppen Climate Classification system, Hague has a humid continental climate, abbreviated "Dfb" on climate maps.

== See also ==
- List of cities in North Dakota
