= List of cemeteries in North Dakota =

Cemeteries in North Dakota

This list of cemeteries in North Dakota includes currently operating, historical (closed for new interments), and defunct (graves abandoned or removed) cemeteries, columbaria, and mausolea which are historical and/or notable. It does not include pet cemeteries.

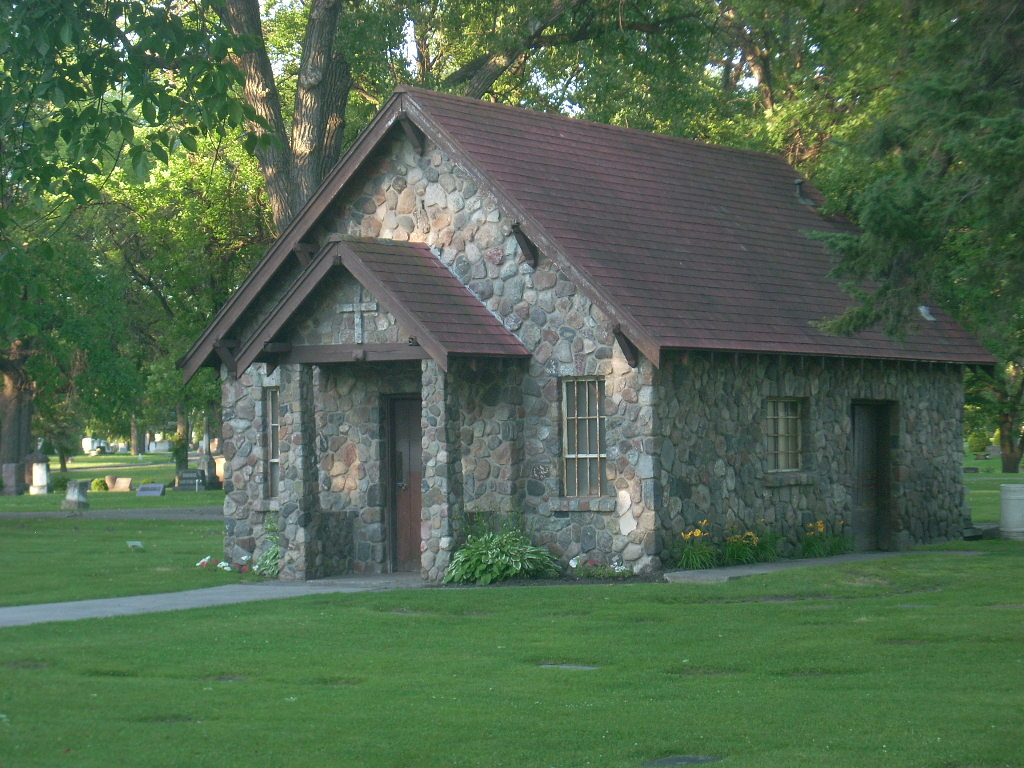
A stone chapel, part of the WPA Stone Structures in Memorial Park and Calvary Cemetery

== Benson County ==
- St. Boniface Cemetery, Wrought-Iron Cross Site, near Selz; NRHP-listed

== Emmons County ==
- Old St. Mary's Cemetery, Wrought-Iron Cross Site, near Hague; NRHP-listed
- Sacred Heart Cemetery, Wrought-Iron Cross Site, Linton; NRHP-listed
- Tirsbol Cemetery, Wrought-Iron Cross Site, near Strasburg; NRHP-listed
- Wrought-iron cross sites of Holy Trinity Cemetery, Strasburg; NRHP-listed
- Wrought-iron cross sites of St. Aloysius Cemetery, Hague; NRHP-listed
- Wrought-iron cross sites of St. Mary's Cemetery, near Hague; NRHP-listed

== Grand Forks County ==
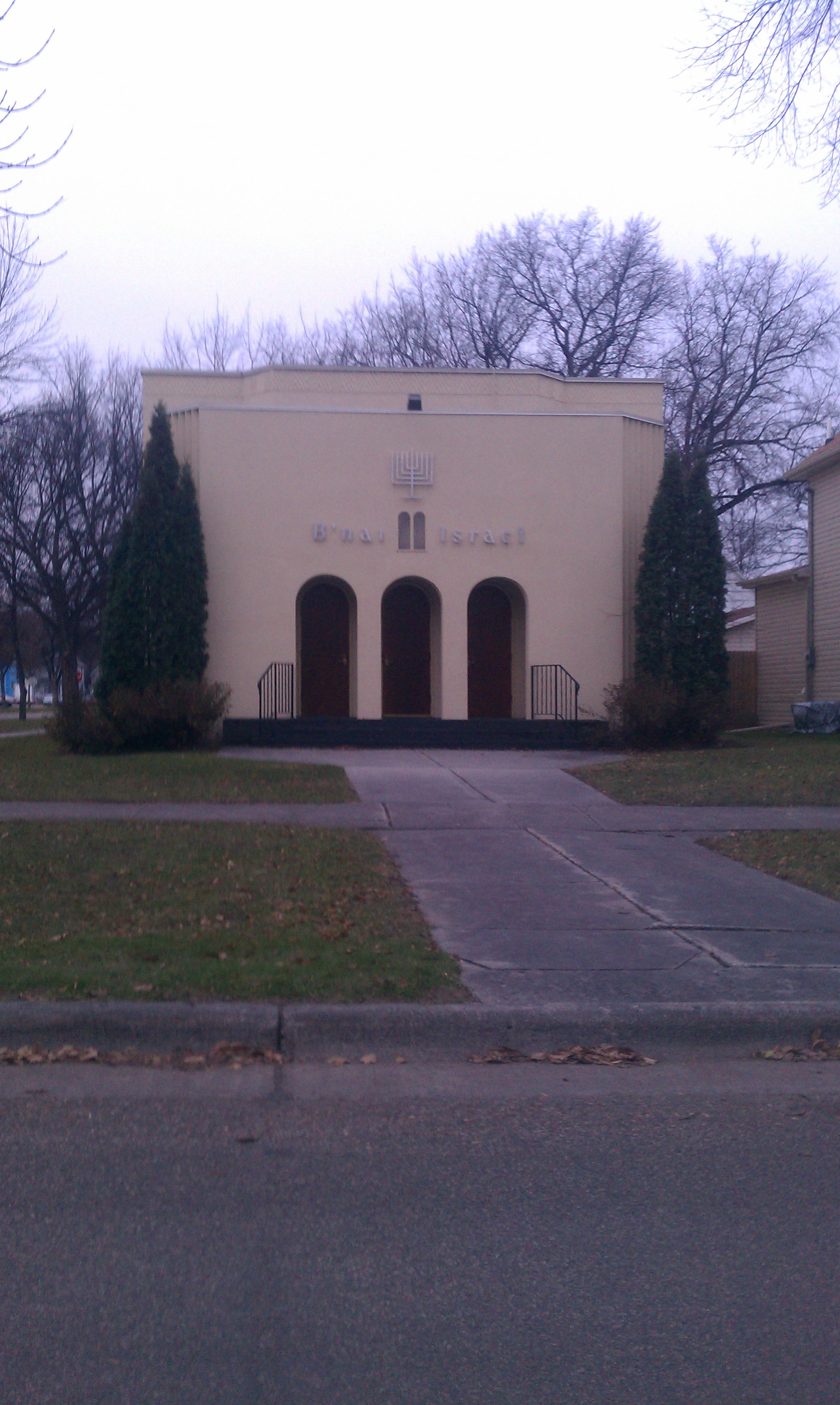
The synagogue at B'nai Israel Synagogue and Montefiore Cemetery

- B'nai Israel Synagogue and Montefiore Cemetery, Grand Forks; NRHP-listed
- WPA Stone Structures in Memorial Park and Calvary Cemetery, Grand Forks; NRHP-listed

== McHenry County ==
- Old Saints Peter and Paul Cemetery, Wrought-Iron Cross Site, Karlsruhe; NRHP-listed
- St. Anselm's Cemetery, Wrought-Iron Cross Site, near Berwick; NRHP-listed

== McIntosh County ==
- Ashley Jewish Homesteaders Cemetery
- Wrought-iron cross sites of St. John's Cemetery, near Zeeland; NRHP-listed

== McLean County ==
- Zion Lutheran Cemetery, Wrought-Iron Cross Site, near Mercer; NRHP-listed

== Pierce County ==
- Old Mt. Carmel Cemetery, Wrought-Iron Cross Site, Balta; NRHP-listed
- Old Saint John Nepomocene Cemetery, Wrought-Iron Cross Site, near Orrin; NRHP-listed
- St. Anselm's Cemetery, Wrought-Iron Cross Site, near Berwick; NRHP-listed
- St. Mathias Cemetery, Wrought-Iron Cross Site, near Orrin; NRHP-listed

== Renville County ==
- McKinney Cemetery, Tolley; NRHP-listed

== Richland County ==
- Fairview Cemetery, Wahpeton

== Ward County ==
- Our Savior's Scandinavian Lutheran Church, near Coulee; NRHP-listed
- South Wild Rice Church (also known as St. John's Lutheran Church of Richland County), near Galchutt; NRHP-listed

== Cemeteries on the NRHP in North Dakota ==
Cemeteries on the National Register of Historic Places (NRHP) in North Dakota

- B'nai Israel Synagogue and Montefiore Cemetery
- McKinney Cemetery
- Old Mt. Carmel Cemetery, Wrought-Iron Cross Site
- Old Saint John Nepomocene Cemetery, Wrought-Iron Cross Site
- Old St. Mary's Cemetery, Wrought-Iron Cross Site
- Old Saints Peter and Paul Cemetery, Wrought-Iron Cross Site
- Our Savior's Scandinavian Lutheran Church
- Sacred Heart Cemetery, Wrought-Iron Cross Site
- South Wild Rice Church
- St. Anselm's Cemetery, Wrought-Iron Cross Site
- St. Boniface Cemetery, Wrought-Iron Cross Site
- St. Mathias Cemetery, Wrought-Iron Cross Site
- Tirsbol Cemetery, Wrought-Iron Cross Site
- WPA Stone Structures in Memorial Park and Calvary Cemetery
- Wrought-iron cross sites of Holy Trinity Cemetery
- Wrought-iron cross sites of St. Aloysius Cemetery (Hague, North Dakota)
- Wrought-iron cross sites of St. John's Cemetery (Zeeland, North Dakota)
- Wrought-iron cross sites of St. Mary's Cemetery (Hague, North Dakota)
- Zion Lutheran Cemetery, Wrought-Iron Cross Site

== See also ==
- List of cemeteries in the United States
