= National Register of Historic Places listings in Ward County, North Dakota =

Location of Ward County in North Dakota

This is a list of the National Register of Historic Places listings in Ward County, North Dakota.

This is intended to be a complete list of the properties and districts on the National Register of Historic Places in Ward County, North Dakota, United States. The locations of National Register properties and districts for which the latitude and longitude coordinates are included below, may be seen in a map.

There are 14 properties and districts listed on the National Register in the county, and one former listing.

Contents: Counties in North Dakota
Adams | Barnes | Benson | Billings | Bottineau | Bowman | Burke | Burleigh | Cass | Cavalier | Dickey | Divide | Dunn | Eddy | Emmons | Foster | Golden Valley | Grand Forks | Grant | Griggs | Hettinger | Kidder | LaMoure | Logan | McHenry | McIntosh | McKenzie | McLean | Mercer | Morton | Mountrail | Nelson | Oliver | Pembina | Pierce | Ramsey | Ransom | Renville | Richland | Rolette | Sargent | Sheridan | Sioux | Slope | Stark | Steele | Stutsman | Towner | Traill | Walsh | Ward | Wells | Williams

This National Park Service list is complete through NPS recent listings posted May 1, 2026.

== Current listings ==
	Name on the Register	Image	Date listed	Location	City or town	Description
1	Andrew Carr, Sr. House	Andrew Carr, Sr. House	April 26, 1984 (#84002771)	510 4th Ave., NW. 48°14′25″N 101°18′06″W	Minot	
2	Eastwood Park Bridge	Eastwood Park Bridge	April 21, 1975 (#75001307)	Central Ave. and 6th St., SE. 48°14′10″N 101°17′03″W	Minot	North Dakota's only false arch bridge
3	Eastwood Park Historic District	Eastwood Park Historic District	October 16, 1986 (#86002824)	Bounded by Old Souris Oxbow; 48°14′06″N 101°16′50″W	Minot	
4	Levi Glick Round Barn		March 25, 1987 (#86002760)	ND 38; 48°13′29″N 101°10′20″W	Surrey	
5	Minot Carnegie Library	Minot Carnegie Library	November 10, 1980 (#80002929)	105 2nd Ave., SE. 48°14′05″N 101°17′27″W	Minot	
6	Minot Commercial Historic District	Minot Commercial Historic District	October 16, 1980 (#86002823)	Roughly bounded by Soo Line railroad line, and Burdick Expressway, and Broadway; 48°14′02″N 101°18′02″W	Minot	
7	Minot Industrial Historic District	Minot Industrial Historic District	October 16, 1986 (#86002818)	Roughly bounded by the Souris River, 5th St., NE., 1st Ave., SE., 1st St., NE., Soo Line railroad line, and Broadway; 48°14′19″N 101°17′17″W	Minot	
8	Our Savior's Scandinavian Lutheran Church	Our Savior's Scandinavian Lutheran Church	February 15, 2005 (#05000060)	1 mile north of ND 50 and 0.25 miles west of Ward County Road 1; 48°33′42″N 102°07′44″W	near Coulee	
9	Soo Line Passenger Depot	Soo Line Passenger Depot	January 20, 1978 (#78001996)	11 N. Main St. 48°14′13″N 101°17′34″W	Minot	
10	Tufveson House	Tufveson House	April 12, 1984 (#84002773)	426 4th Ave., NW. 48°14′26″N 101°18′05″W	Minot	
11	U.S. Post Office-Minot	U.S. Post Office-Minot	October 14, 1980 (#80002930)	100 1st St., SW. 48°14′04″N 101°17′36″W	Minot	
12	Union National Bank and Annex	Union National Bank and Annex	January 27, 1983 (#83001941)	2 N. Main and 7-11 E. Central Ave. 48°14′12″N 101°17′32″W	Minot	
13	Ward County Courthouse	Ward County Courthouse	November 14, 1985 (#85002997)	315 3rd St., SE. 48°13′59″N 101°17′15″W	Minot	
14	Westland Oil Filling Station	Westland Oil Filling Station	February 27, 1987 (#86002816)	510 E. Central Ave. 48°14′11″N 101°17′05″W	Minot	

== Former listings ==
	Name on the Register	Image	Date listed	Date removed	Location	City or town	Description
1	South Prairie Community Hall		June 7, 2006 (#06000474)	March 23, 2026	177th Ave., SW. 48°03′17″N 101°17′57″W	Minot	

== See also ==
- National Register of Historic Places listings in North Dakota
