= John Krim =

John Krim was a German-Russian immigrant to the United States who was a master craftsman of wrought-iron funerary crosses. He worked in Pierce County, North Dakota. He was one of a number of "German-Russian blacksmiths in central North Dakota" that developed their individual cross styles and whose "work was known for miles around them."

A number of his works are listed on the National Register of Historic Places.

Works include:

- One or more works in Old Mt. Carmel Cemetery, Wrought-Iron Cross Site, Address Restricted Balta, North Dakota (Krim, John), NRHP-listed
- One or more works in Old Saint John Nepomocene Cemetery, Wrought-Iron Cross Site, Address Restricted Orrin, North Dakota (Krim, John), NRHP-listed
- One or more works in St. Anselm's Cemetery, Wrought-Iron Cross Site, Address Restricted Berwick, North Dakota (Krim, John), NRHP-listed
- One or more works in St. Boniface Cemetery, Wrought-Iron Cross Site, Address Restricted Selz, North Dakota (Krim, John), NRHP-listed
- One or more works in St. Mathias Cemetery, Wrought-Iron Cross Site, Address Restricted Orrin, North Dakota (Krim, John), NRHP-listed
