= McKinney Cemetery =

Historic cemetery in Renville County, North Dakota, US

- U.S. National Register of Historic Places
- Location within North Dakota Location within the United States
- Nearest city: Tolley, North Dakota
- Coordinates: 48°45′35″N 101°46′58″W
- Area: 3 acres (1.2 ha)
- Built: c. 1886
- Architectural style: Log-cabin
- NRHP reference No.: 78001994
- Added to NRHP: December 28, 1978

The McKinney Cemetery near Tolley, North Dakota, United States, was founded circa 1886. It has also been known as the Renville Valley Pioneer Cemetery. It was listed on the National Register of Historic Places (NRHP) in 1978. According to its NRHP nomination, the cemetery is the oldest cemetery in Renville County and "is also the only remaining physical manifestation of the former town of McKinney."
