= South Wild Rice Church =

Historic church in North Dakota, United States

- U.S. National Register of Historic Places
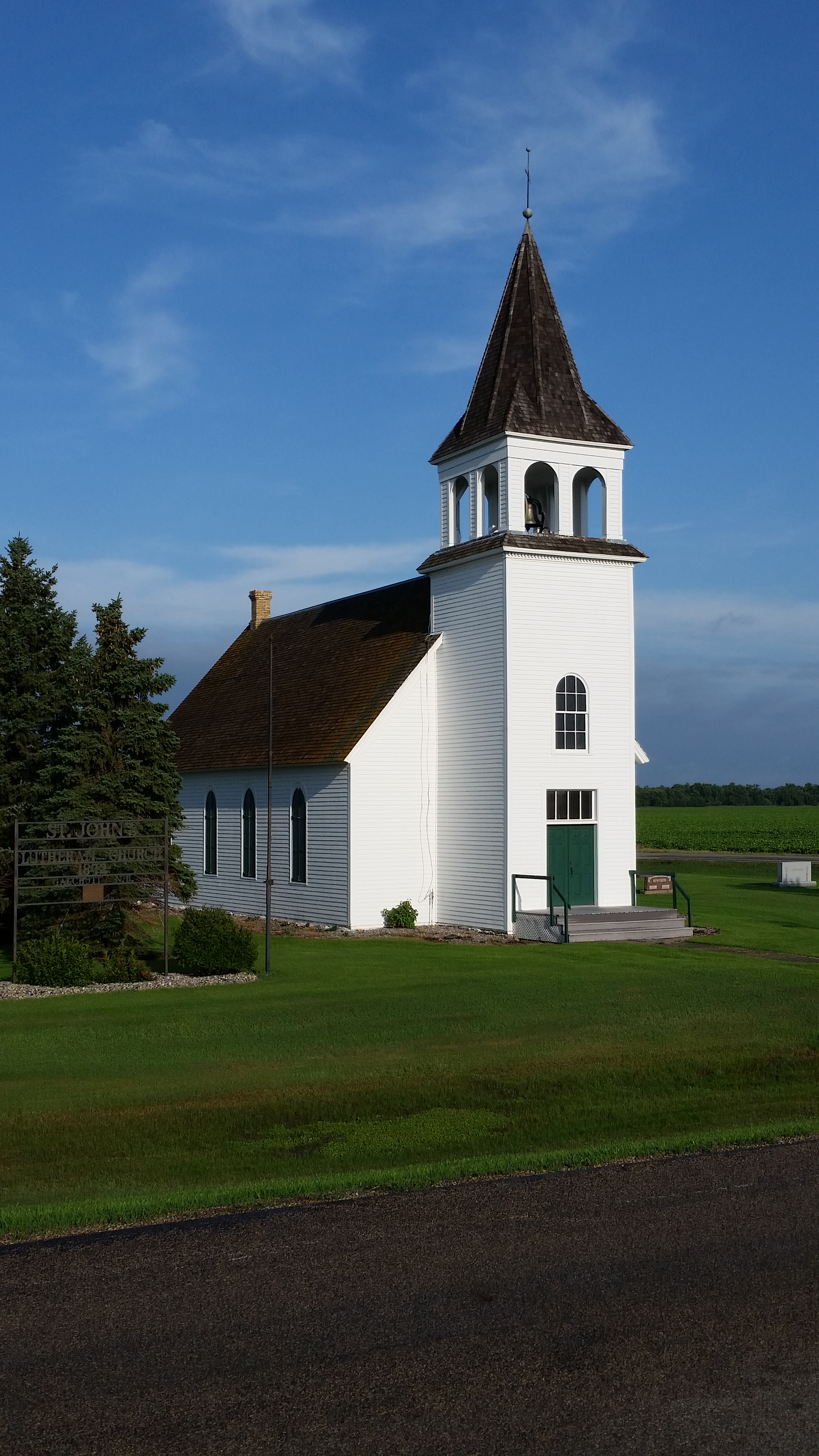
- St. John's as of August 31, 2014

- Location within North Dakota Location within the United States
- Location: Intersection of U.S. Route 81 and Richland County Road 8
- Nearest city: Galchutt, North Dakota
- Coordinates: 46°23′1″N 96°44′11″W
- Area: 2 acres (0.81 ha)
- Built: 1883
- NRHP reference No.: 82001345
- Added to NRHP: October 22, 1982

St. John's Lutheran Church of Richland County, was built in 1883 by the faith community originally known as the South Wild Rice Lutheran Congregation, whose constitution was adopted on December 27, 1872. In 1882 the name of the faith community was changed to St. John's as construction of the building began. This wood-frame church still stands on its original "single course, dry-laid, uncut fieldstone foundation," and is located east of the Wild Rice River in the Red River Valley near Galchutt, North Dakota.

== History ==
The South Wild Rice Congregation was made up of Norwegian immigrants who arrived in the area in the early 1870s. In October 1873 the first annual meeting of the congregation was held, at which it was decided to reserve a 2 acre-parcel of land, found on Section 32, Range 48, Township 134, for religious purposes. One acre was to be set aside as church property, while the remaining acre was to be used as the church's cemetery. The oldest date on any grave marker is 1877.

In its early years, this congregation met in members' homes. In 1874 a log schoolhouse was built and served as a church until the congregation could afford a separate building. This first schoolhouse was not very large, only 18 by 22 by 10 feet. Later it was moved to land just north of the church. The community was one of several congregations served by pastor J. A. Hellestvedt. Hellestvedt was the first Norwegian Lutheran pastor to reside in North Dakota, having settled in the state in 1873.

St. John's was built in 1883, with the bell tower having been added in 1897, it was listed on the United States National Register of Historic Places in 1982. The church's listing on the National Register was based on its connection with the first wave of Norwegian Lutheran settlers in the region, the early settlement of southeastern North Dakota, and its retention of "greater integrity than any other church building in the region."

The church building has not been used for regular services since 1956, except for occasional events such as periodic worship services, baptisms and weddings. However, burial activity in the cemetery has continued.

== Tenure ==
St. John's stands today as a monument of the early pioneers. Although regular services are no longer held, the church build and grounds are maintained by the descendants of these pioneers. Since 1956 this responsibility has been held in trust by the people of Galchutt Lutheran Church of Galchutt, North Dakota.

== See also ==
- Norwegian Dakotan
