= Old Saints Peter and Paul Cemetery, Wrought-Iron Cross Site =

Historic cemetery in McHenry County, North Dakota, US

- U.S. National Register of Historic Places
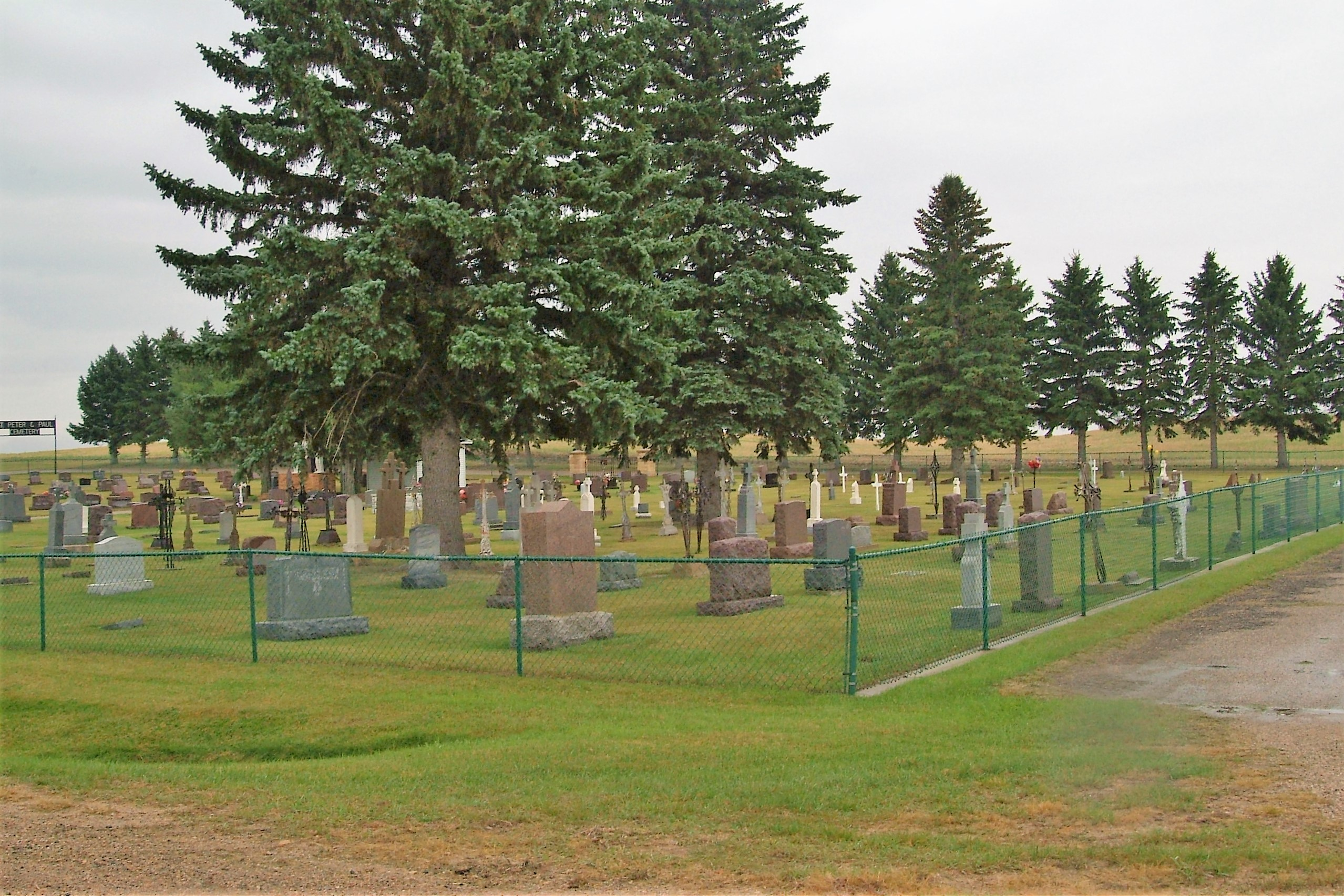

- Location within North Dakota Location within the United States
- Nearest city: Karlsruhe, North Dakota
- Coordinates: 48°05′39″N 100°36′41″W
- Area: less than one acre
- Built by: Anton Massine
- Architectural style: Wrought-iron cross
- MPS: German-Russian Wrought-Iron Cross Sites in Central North Dakota MPS
- NRHP reference No.: 89001682
- Added to NRHP: October 23, 1989

The Old Saints Peter and Paul Cemetery, Wrought-Iron Cross Site, near Karlsruhe, North Dakota, United States, is a historic site that was listed on the National Register of Historic Places in 1989. The listing included 13 contributing objects. It includes work by Anton Massine of Orrin, who is one of a number of "German-Russian blacksmiths in central North Dakota" who developed individual styles in their crosses and whose "work was known for miles around them."
