= Emmons County Record =

Weekly newspaper published in Linton, North Dakota

- Type: Weekly newspaper
- Owner: Joseph L. Mullen
- Founder: Darwin R. Streeter
- Publisher: Kelsey Majeske
- Founded: June 10, 1884
- Language: English
- Headquarters: Emmons County, North Dakota, USA
- Circulation: 4,000
- Website: ecrecord.com

The Emmons County Record is a weekly newspaper based in Linton, North Dakota.

== History ==
On June 10, 1884, Darwin R. Streeter published the first edition of the Emmons County Record in Williamsport, North Dakota. In 1889, the Record relocated to Linton. In 1914, D.R. Streeter retired and sold the paper to his son, Frank B. Streeter, and in 1918 died at age 69. In 1927, Lester E. Koeppen and C.C. Lowe leased the paper from F.B. Streeter, and bought it six months later.

In 1931, Ralph E. Hubbard bought out Lowe. Later that year, he and Koeppen bought the Emmons County Free Press, a rival paper which the Record bitterly feuded with for decades, from J.M. Stewart and absorbed it into the Record. In 1946, Koeppen became sole owner. In 1949, William "Bill" Fischer became editor and in 1964 bought out Koeppen. In 1972, Cecil D. Jahraus became editor. In 1975, former owner Koeppen died at age 80. In 1976, Jahraus bought out Fischer after he retired.

In 1983, Jahraus issued a public apology after writing an column congratulating North Dakota University's football team for beating a "black team" from Ohio to win a national title. In 1988, DAK Publishing, Inc. acquired the Record. In 1992, the company entered receivership. In 1993, a court approved the sale of DAK's 13 publications to Dickson Media Inc. for $1.97 million. Two months later husband-and-wife Allen and Leah Burke bought the Record. In 2020, Joseph L. Mullen acquired the Record and the Pollock Prairie Pioneer from the Burkes.
