= Sacred Heart Cemetery, Wrought-Iron Cross Site =

Historic cemetery in Emmons County, North Dakota, US

Coordinates: 46°12′58″N 100°05′35″W

- U.S. National Register of Historic Places
- Location within North Dakota Location within the United States
- Nearest city: Linton, North Dakota
- Area: less than one acre
- Architectural style: Wrought-iron cross
- MPS: German-Russian Wrought-Iron Cross Sites in Central North Dakota MPS
- NRHP reference No.: 89001691
- Added to NRHP: October 23, 1989

The Sacred Heart Cemetery, Wrought-Iron Cross Site, near Linton, North Dakota, United States, is a historic site that was listed on the National Register of Historic Places in 1989. It includes wrought-iron crosses. The listing included four contributing objects. The National Register database listing for this site does not identify any specific blacksmith whose work is present here. However, there were a number of "German-Russian blacksmiths in central North Dakota" who developed individual styles in their crosses and whose "work was known for miles around them."

== See also ==
- Tirsbol Cemetery, Wrought-Iron Cross Site
