= Tufveson House =

Historic house in North Dakota, United States

- U.S. National Register of Historic Places
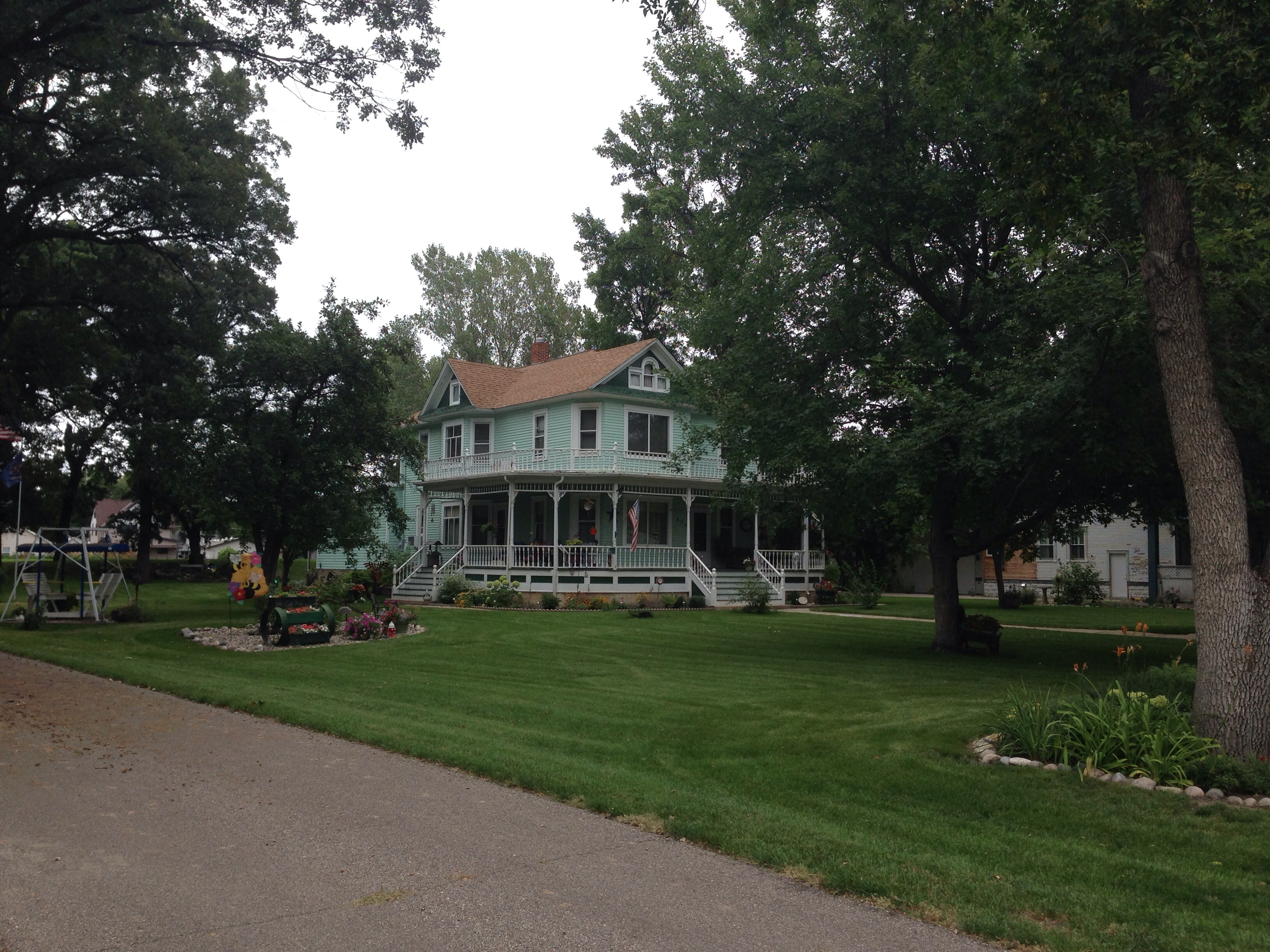

- Location within North Dakota Location within the United States
- Location: 426 4th Ave., NW, Minot, North Dakota
- Coordinates: 48°14′26″N 101°18′5″W
- Area: less than one acre
- Built: 1900
- Built by: Tufveson, Nels
- Architectural style: Queen Anne
- NRHP reference No.: 84002773
- Added to NRHP: April 12, 1984

The Tufveson House is a Queen Anne style house in Minot, North Dakota, United States. It was listed on the National Register of Historic Places in 1984.

The house was built in 1900. The builder of the home was Nils Tufveson, an immigrant from Sweden. Nils Tufveson was born at Eslöv in Skåne, Sweden. He was married to Kersti Olsdotter Tufveson who was born at Simrishamn in Skåne, Sweden. Tufveson was one of the early settlers of the Souris River Valley, arriving in the area by 1884.
