= St. Anselm's Cemetery, Wrought-Iron Cross Site =

Historic cemetery in Pierce County, North Dakota, US

- U.S. National Register of Historic Places
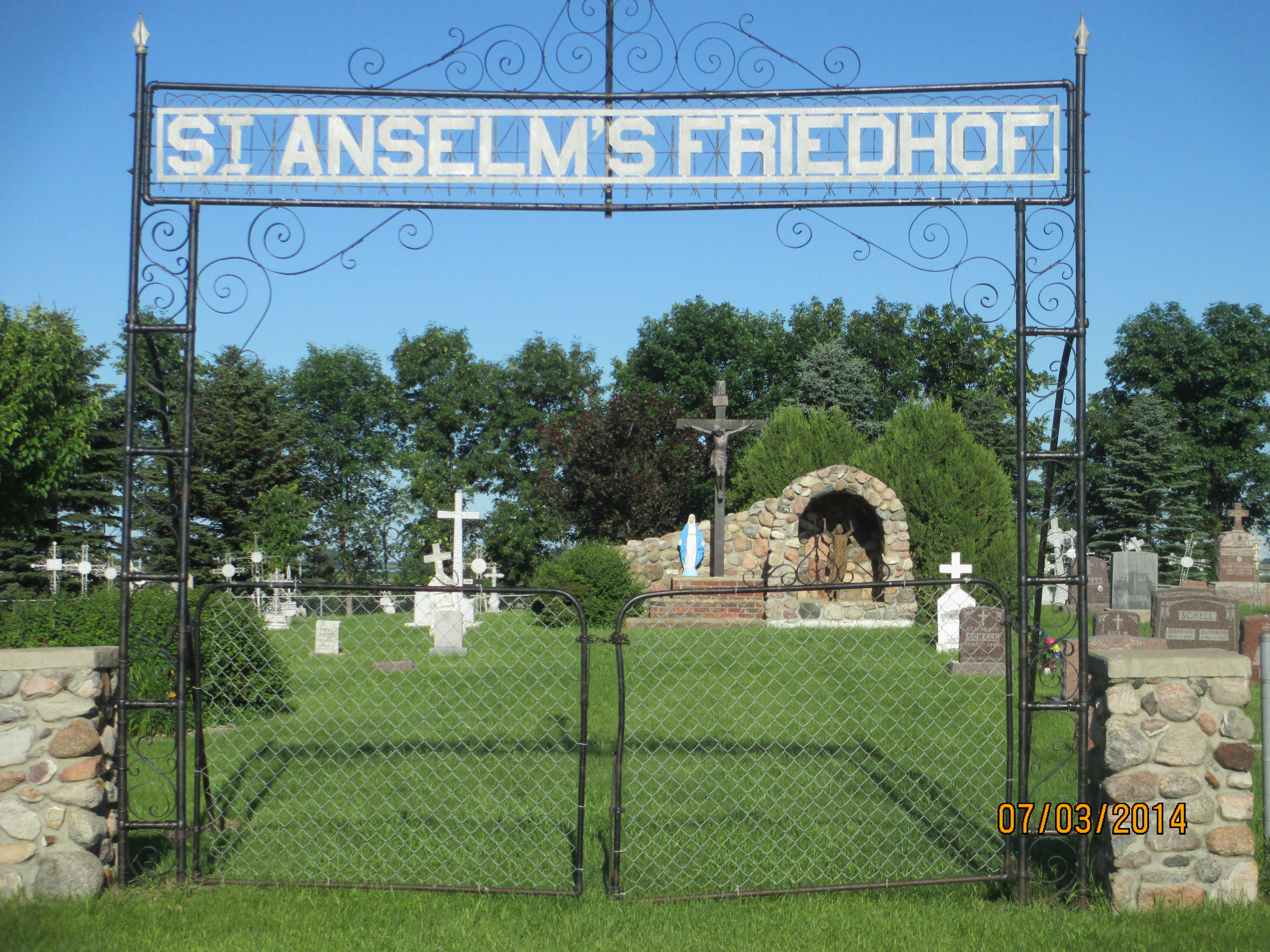

- Location within North Dakota Location within the United States
- Nearest city: Berwick, North Dakota
- Coordinates: 48°15′42″N 100°12′56″W
- Area: less than one acre
- Architect: Joseph P. Klein, John Krim
- Architectural style: Wrought-iron cross
- MPS: German-Russian Wrought-Iron Cross Sites in Central North Dakota MPS
- NRHP reference No.: 89001681
- Added to NRHP: October 23, 1989

St. Anselm's Cemetery, Wrought-Iron Cross Site near Berwick, North Dakota, United States, was listed on the National Register of Historic Places in 1989. It is a historic site within a cemetery that includes wrought-iron crosses. The NRHP listing included 69 contributing objects.

It includes work by Joseph B. Klein and John Krim, both of Pierce County. They were among a number of "German-Russian blacksmiths in central North Dakota" who developed individual styles in their crosses and whose "work was known for miles around them."
