= St. Boniface Cemetery, Wrought-Iron Cross Site =

Historic cemetery in Benson County, North Dakota, US

- U.S. National Register of Historic Places
- Location within North Dakota Location within the United States
- Nearest city: Selz, North Dakota
- Coordinates: 47°52′58″N 99°48′39″W
- Area: 3.1 acres (1.3 ha)
- Built by: Joseph Klein, John Krim
- Architectural style: Wrought-iron cross
- MPS: German-Russian Wrought-Iron Cross Sites in Central North Dakota MPS
- NRHP reference No.: 89001686
- Added to NRHP: October 23, 1989

St. Boniface Cemetery, Wrought-Iron Cross Site is a 3.1-acre (1.3 ha) cemetery in Benson County, North Dakota, United States, several miles to the East-North East of Selz that was listed on the National Register of Historic Places in 1989. It was associated with the later demolished St. Boniface Catholic church which was located on the opposite side of the road – thus in Pierce County – and active from 1905 through 1930. It mainly served a population of Germans from Russia.

It includes a collection of wooden and wrought-iron crosses, most of which have lost their paint and are in poor condition.

It includes works by Joseph P. Klein and John Krim, both of Pierce County, who were among a number of "German-Russian blacksmiths in central North Dakota" that developed their individual cross styles and whose "work was known for miles around them."
