= WPA Stone Structures in Memorial Park and Calvary Cemetery =

United States historic place in North Dakota

- U.S. National Register of Historic Places
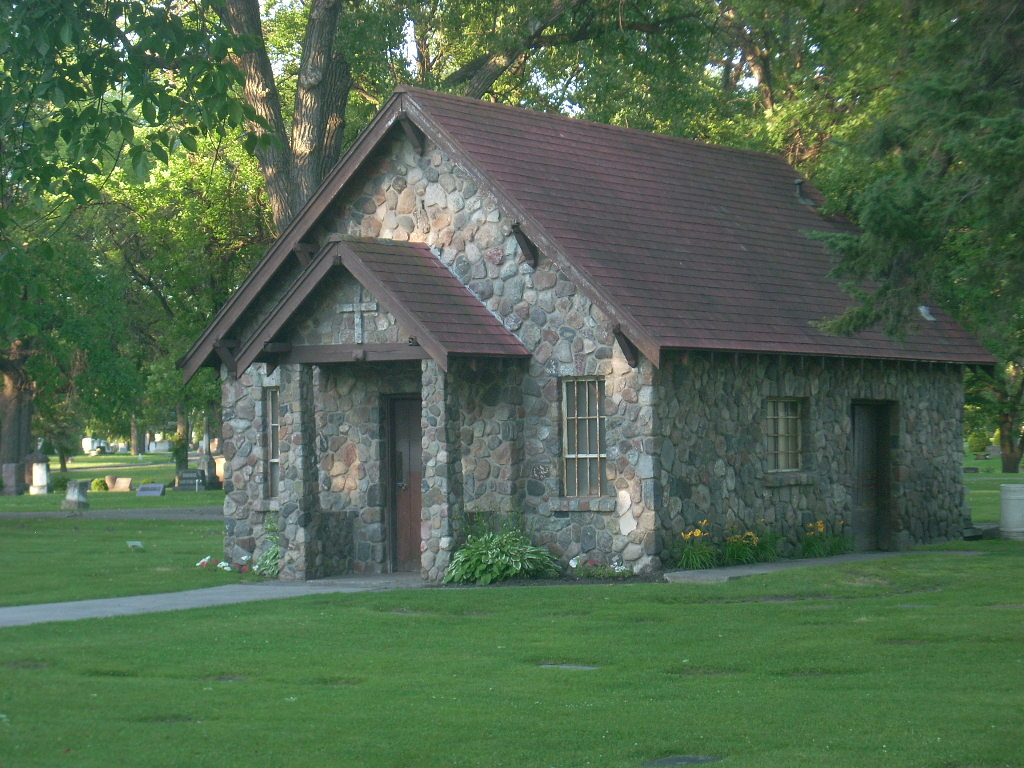
- Stone chapel

- Location within North Dakota
- Location: Southeast Corner from intersection of Gateway Dr and N Columbia Rd, Grand Forks, North Dakota
- Coordinates: 47°55′59″N 97°04′00″W
- Area: less than one acre
- Built: 1933
- Architect: Ray F. Wyrick
- Architectural style: Late Victorian, Bungalow/Craftsman
- MPS: Federal Relief Construction in North Dakota, 1931–1943, MPS
- NRHP reference No.: 10000424
- Added to NRHP: July 6, 2010

WPA Stone Structures in Memorial Park and Calvary Cemetery, in Grand Forks, North Dakota, United States, was listed on the National Register of Historic Places in 2010. It includes work by Ray F. Wyrick, "'a noted cemetery landscape engineer' from Des Moines, IA, who consulted as a WPA design advisor all over the country." The listing includes "two sets of stone entrance gateways, one relocated set of stone entry cairns, and a stone chapel building." It is believed that Wyrick made provided overall design of general cemetery layout and designed a reflecting pool for the cemetery, too.

The nomination was described in a public hearing of the Grand Forks Historic Preservation Commission in on March 23, 2010.

It was listed on the National Register on July 6, 2010, with reference number 10000424. The listed area extends from the southeast corner of the intersection of Gateway Dr and N Columbia Rd in Grand Forks.

== See also ==
- Grand Forks County Fairgrounds WPA Structures
