= Mercer, North Dakota =

- City
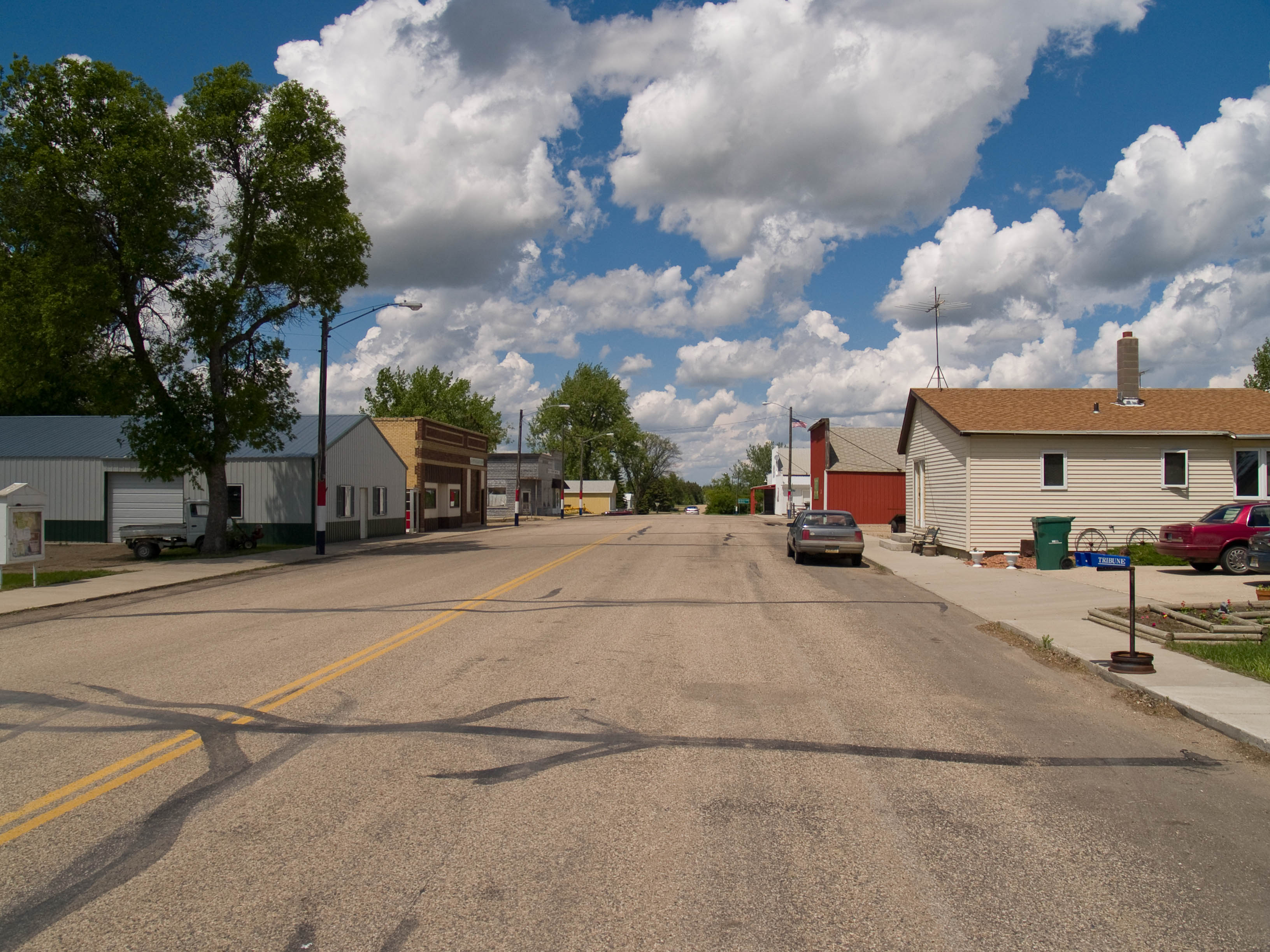
- Street scene in Mercer, North Dakota
- Motto: "Bringing Home the Bison"
- Location of Mercer, North Dakota
- Coordinates: 47.490606°N 100.71114°W
- Country: United States
- State: North Dakota
- County: McLean
- Founded: 1905

Area
  - Total: 0.228 sq mi (0.591 km^{2})
  - Land: 0.222 sq mi (0.576 km^{2})
  - Water: 0.0058 sq mi (0.015 km^{2})
- Elevation: 1,926 ft (587 m)

Population (2020)
  - Total: 88
  - Estimate (2024): 126
  - Density: 395.7/sq mi (152.78/km^{2})
- Time zone: UTC–6 (Central (CST))
  - Summer (DST): UTC–5 (CDT)
- ZIP Code: 58559
- Area code: 701
- FIPS code: 38-52340
- GNIS feature ID: 1036159
- Website: mercercitynd.org

Mercer is a city in McLean County, North Dakota, United States. The population was 88 at the 2020 census, and was estimated to be 126 in 2024,

Mercer was founded in 1905 along a now-abandoned branch line of the Northern Pacific Railway extending from Carrington to Turtle Lake. The name comes from William Henry Harrison Mercer, a well known rancher in the Missouri River Valley for many years and for whom Mercer County is also named.

== Geography ==
The city of Mercer lies on North Dakota Highway 200 between Underwood and McClusky.

According to the United States Census Bureau, the city has a total area of 0.228 square miles (0.59 km^{2}), of which 0.222 square miles (0.57 km^{2}) is land and 0.006 square miles (0.02 km^{2}) is water.

== Demographics ==
Historical population
Census	Pop.	Note	%±
1950	214		—
1960	154		−28.0%
1970	132		−14.3%
1980	134		1.5%
1990	104		−22.4%
2000	86		−17.3%
2010	94		9.3%
2020	88		−6.4%
2024 (est.)	126		43.2%
U.S. Decennial Census; 2020 Census

Zion Lutheran Cemetery, Wrought-Iron Cross Site, in or near Mercer, is listed on the National Register of Historic Places.

=== 2010 census ===
As of the 2010 census, there were 94 people, 48 households, and 24 families residing in the city. The population density was 427.3 inhabitants per square mile (165.0/km^{2}). There were 58 housing units at an average density of 263.6 per square mile (101.8/km^{2}). The racial makeup of the city was 97.9% White, 1.1% Asian, and 1.1% from two or more races.

There were 48 households, of which 25.0% had children under the age of 18 living with them, 41.7% were married couples living together, 6.3% had a female householder with no husband present, 2.1% had a male householder with no wife present, and 50.0% were non-families. 43.8% of all households were made up of individuals, and 29.2% had someone living alone who was 65 years of age or older. The average household size was 1.96 and the average family size was 2.71.

The median age in the city was 53.5 years. 22.3% of residents were under the age of 18; 0% were between the ages of 18 and 24; 14.9% were from 25 to 44; 30.9% were from 45 to 64; and 31.9% were 65 years of age or older. The gender makeup of the city was 51.1% male and 48.9% female.

=== 2000 census ===
As of the 2000 census, there were 86 people, 49 households, and 22 families residing in the city. The population density was 398.2 inhabitants per square mile (153.7/km^{2}). There were 56 housing units at an average density of 259.3 per square mile (100.1/km^{2}). The racial makeup of the city was 100.00% White.

There were 49 households, out of which 18.4% had children under the age of 18 living with them, 36.7% were married couples living together, 4.1% had a female householder with no husband present, and 55.1% were non-families. 55.1% of all households were made up of individuals, and 32.7% had someone living alone who was 65 years of age or older. The average household size was 1.76 and the average family size was 2.59.

In the city, the population was spread out, with 16.3% under the age of 18, 2.3% from 18 to 24, 20.9% from 25 to 44, 29.1% from 45 to 64, and 31.4% who were 65 years of age or older. The median age was 51 years. For every 100 females, there were 75.5 males. For every 100 females age 18 and over, there were 71.4 males.

The median income for a household in the city was $28,750, and the median income for a family was $46,250. Males had a median income of $48,125 versus $15,000 for females. The per capita income for the city was $18,937. There were 25.0% of families and 25.3% of the population living below the poverty line, including 23.5% who were under eighteen and 34.8% who were over 64.

== Education ==
It is within the Turtle Lake-Mercer Public School District 72.
