= Union National Bank and Annex =

Buildings in Minot, North Dakota

- U.S. National Register of Historic Places
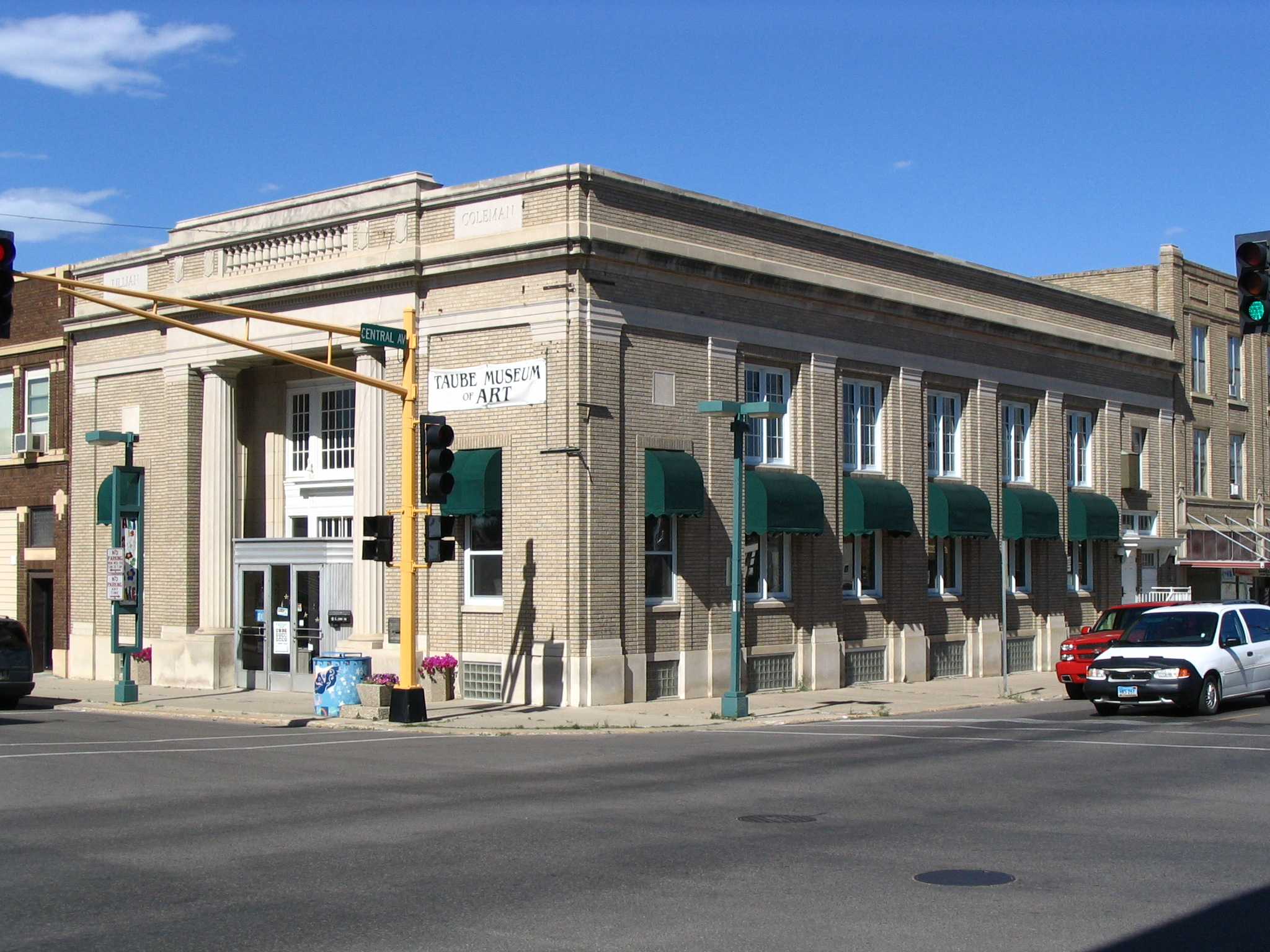

- Location within North Dakota Location within the United States
- Location: 2 N. Main and 7-11 E. Central Ave., Minot, North Dakota
- Coordinates: 48°14′12″N 101°17′32″W
- Area: less than one acre
- Built: 1924
- Architect: George H. Bugenhagen; Frederick C. Klawiter
- Architectural style: Classical Revival
- NRHP reference No.: 83001941
- Added to NRHP: January 27, 1983

The Union National Bank and Annex in Minot, North Dakota are two buildings in the Classical Revival style that were listed together on the National Register of Historic Places in 1983.

It was built to replace the Union National Bank that was destroyed by fire on July 9, 1923.

It was designed by Minot architect George H. Bugenhagen (1883–1953) in association with St. Paul, Minnesota architect Frederick C. Klawiter (1889–1983).
