= B'nai Israel Synagogue and Montefiore Cemetery =

Synagogue and cemetery in North Dakota, US

B'nai Israel Synagogue
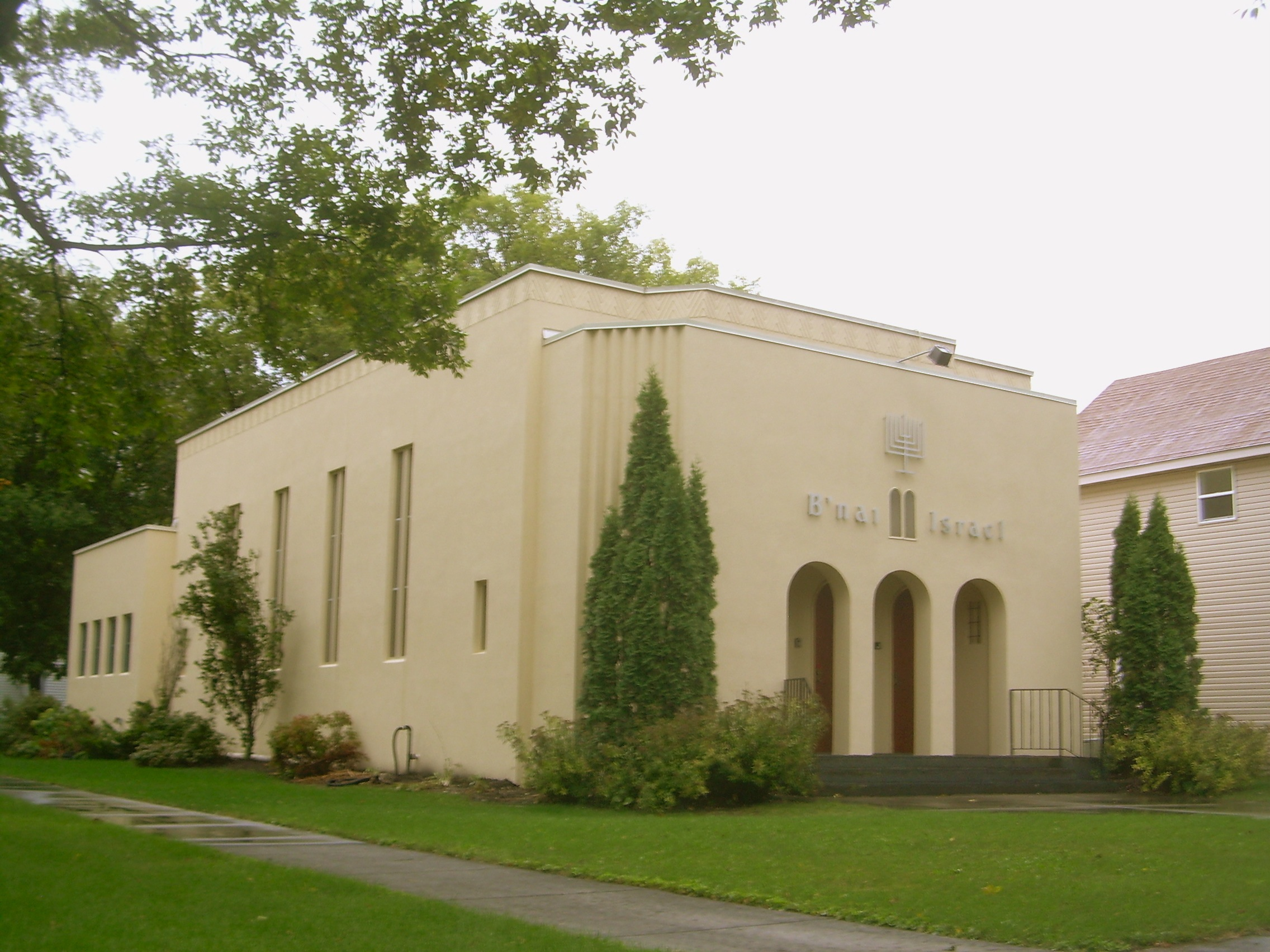
- The synagogue, in 2010

- Location in North Dakota

Religion
- Affiliation: Reform Judaism
- Ecclesiastical or organizational status: Synagogue
- Leadership: Lay–led
- Status: Active

Location
- Location: 601 Cottonwood Street, Grand Forks, North Dakota
- Country: United States
- Interactive map of B'nai Israel Synagogue
- Coordinates: 47°54′58.2″N 97°1′58.3″W

Architecture
- Architect: Joseph Bell DeRemer
- Type: Synagogue architecture
- Style: Art Deco
- General contractor: Skarsbro and Thorwaldson
- Established: 1891 (as a congregation)
- Completed: 1937
- Construction cost: $14,000

Website
- bnaiisraelnd.org
- B'nai Israel Synagogue and Montefiore Cemetery
- U.S. National Register of Historic Places
- Area: 1 acre (0.40 ha)
- NRHP reference No.: 11000745
- Added to NRHP: October 13, 2011

Montefiore Cemetery
- Interactive map of Montefiore Cemetery

Details
- Established: 1888
- Location: 1450 N. Columbia Road, Grand Forks, North Dakota 58203
- Country: United States
- Coordinates: 47°56′01″N 97°03′59″W

B'nai Israel Synagogue and Montefiore Cemetery in Grand Forks, North Dakota, in the United States, consists of a Reform Jewish congregation and its synagogue; and the congregation's related cemetery. Both the synagogue building and the cemetery were added to the National Register of Historic Places in 2011.

== B'nai Israel Synagogue ==
The B'nai Israel Synagogue (transliterated from Hebrew as "Sons / Children of Israel") is a Reform Jewish congregation and synagogue, located at 601 Cottonwood Street, in Grand Forks.

The congregation was chartered on August 26, 1891; founded by Eastern European Jews, including Jews fleeing pogroms in Russia and Lithuanian Jews. The first building, a wooden synagogue called the Congregation of the Children of Israel, was built in 1891 at 2nd Avenue, South & 7th Street.

The second and current synagogue was built in 1937, designed by Grand Forks architect, Joseph Bell DeRemer, in the Art Deco style of architecture, and built by local builders Skarsbro and Thorwaldson at a cost of $14,000.

In the early 1990s, B'nai Israel joined the Union of American Hebrew Congregations (now the Union for Reform Judaism).

The synagogue has been without a permanent rabbi since 1987.

== Montefiore Cemetery ==
Montefiore Cemetery is a Jewish cemetery located at 1450 North Columbia Road, in Grand Forks. The cemetery dates from 1888. The Montefiore Cemetery in Grand Forks is one of many institutions named in honor of Sir Moses Montefiore.

== Heritage listing ==
On October 13, 2011, the B'nai Israel Synagogue and the Montefiore Cemetery were jointly added to the National Register of Historic Places, as one listing.
