= Old Mt. Carmel Cemetery, Wrought-Iron Cross Site =

Historic cemetery in Pierce County, North Dakota, US

- U.S. National Register of Historic Places
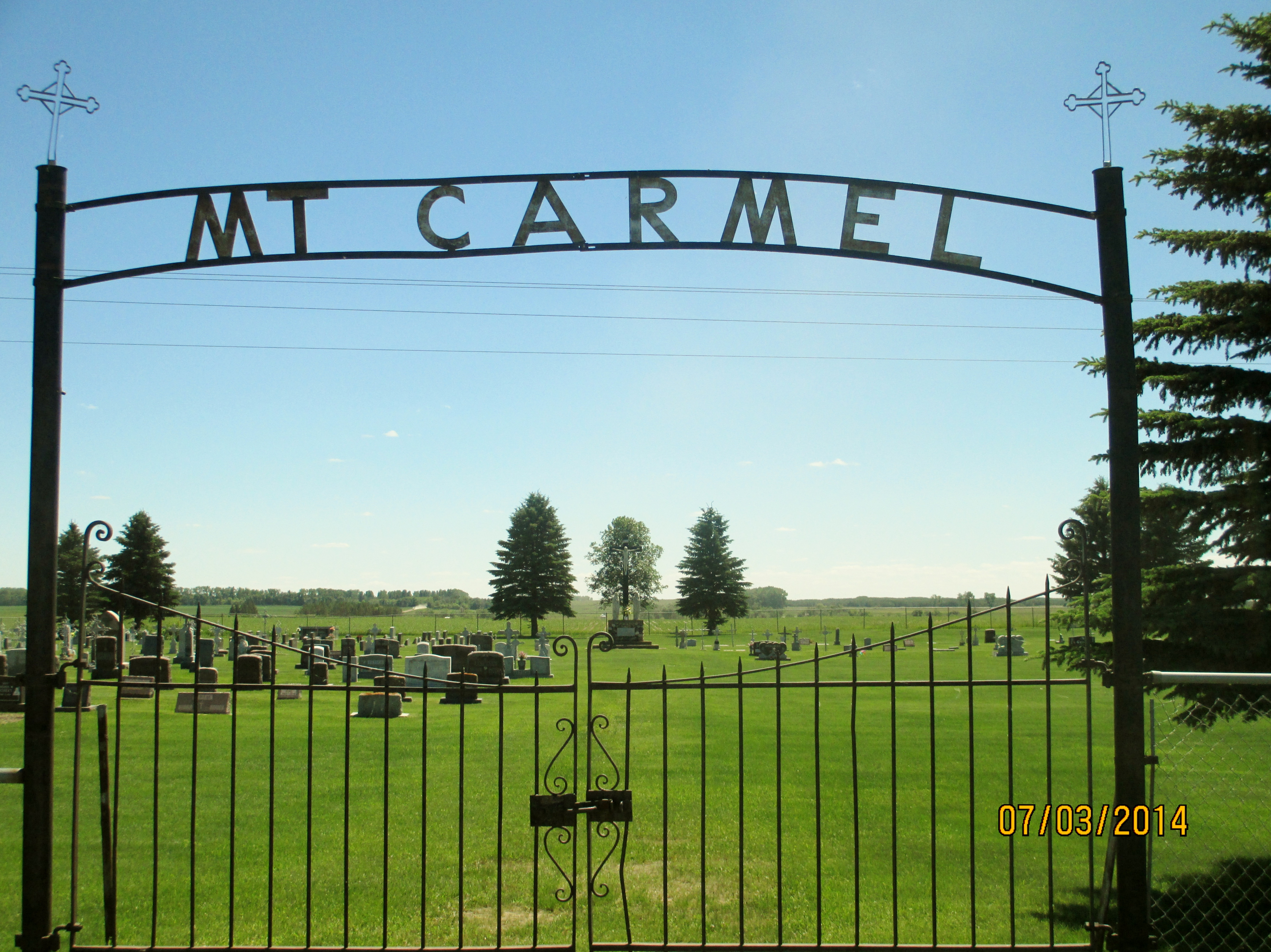

- Location within North Dakota Location within the United States
- Nearest city: Balta, North Dakota
- Coordinates: 48.166014°N 100.045821°W
- Area: less than one acre
- Built by: Krim, John
- Architectural style: Wrought-iron cross
- MPS: German-Russian Wrought-Iron Cross Sites in Central North Dakota MPS
- NRHP reference No.: 89001685
- Added to NRHP: October 23, 1989

The Old Mt. Carmel Cemetery, Wrought-Iron Cross Site, near Balta, North Dakota, is a historic site of wrought-iron crosses that was listed on the National Register of Historic Places in 1989. The listing included six contributing objects.

It includes work by John Krim, of Pierce County. He was one of a number of "German-Russian blacksmiths in central North Dakota" who developed individual styles in their crosses and whose "work was known for miles around them."

== See also ==
- Old St. Mary's Cemetery, Wrought-Iron Cross Site
