= Karlsruhe, North Dakota =

- City
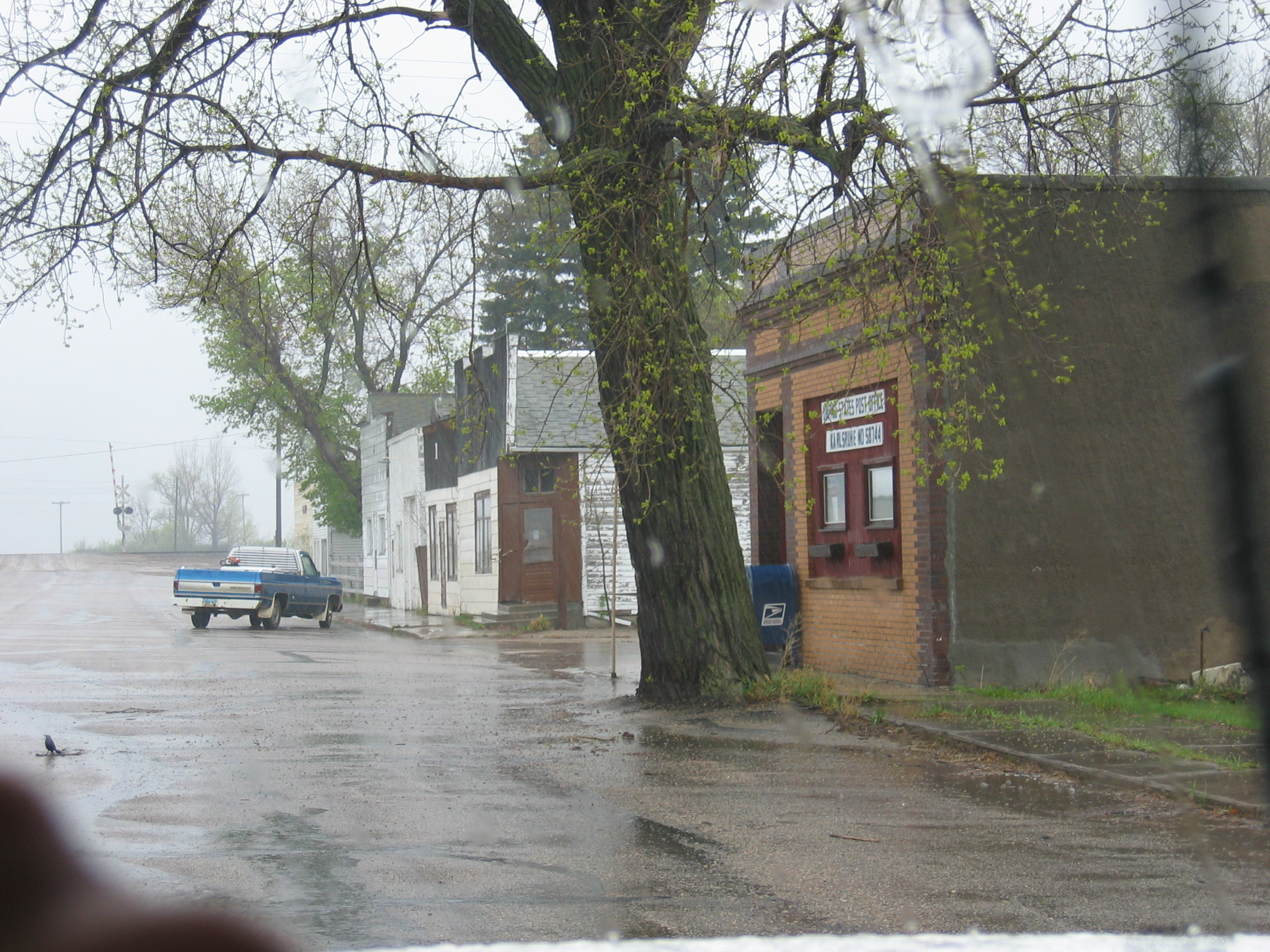
- A view of Karlsruhe

- Location of Karlsruhe, North Dakota
- Coordinates: 48°05′28″N 100°36′58″W
- Country: United States
- State: North Dakota
- County: McHenry
- Founded: 1912

Area
  - Total: 0.75 sq mi (1.94 km^{2})
  - Land: 0.75 sq mi (1.94 km^{2})
  - Water: 0 sq mi (0.00 km^{2})
- Elevation: 1,540 ft (470 m)

Population (2020)
  - Total: 87
  - Estimate (2022): 85
  - Density: 116.0/sq mi (44.77/km^{2})
- Time zone: UTC-6 (Central (CST))
  - Summer (DST): UTC-5 (CDT)
- ZIP code: 58744
- Area code: 701
- FIPS code: 38-41380
- GNIS feature ID: 1036102

Karlsruhe (/ˈkɑːrlsruː/ KARLSS-roo) is a city in McHenry County, North Dakota, United States. The population was 87 at the 2020 census. Karlsruhe was founded in 1912.

Old Saints Peter and Paul Cemetery, Wrought-Iron Cross Site, in or near Karlsruhe, is listed on the National Register of Historic Places. Sts. Peter and Paul Catholic Church in Karlsruhe features works by the artist Count Berthold von Imhoff.

Karlsruhe is also included in the Minot micropolitan statistical area.

== History ==
Karlsruhe was named after the German city of Karlsruhe by Germans from Russia. Karlsruhe was first settled in the late 19th century by German pioneers moving toward northern American prairie lands. These pioneers and their early generations of relatives are buried in the St. Peter and Paul cemetery. In the town's early years, many German traditions were practiced regularly, however, throughout the years it has become an Americanized town, with very few of these traditions still present. Karlsruhe's population has continued to decrease to this day.

== Geography ==
According to the United States Census Bureau, the city has a total area of 0.75 square miles (1.94 km^{2}), all land.

=== Climate ===
This climatic region is typified by large seasonal temperature differences, with warm to hot (and often humid) summers and cold (sometimes severely cold) winters. According to the Köppen Climate Classification system, Karlsruhe has a humid continental climate, abbreviated "Dfb" on climate maps. McHenry County has a higher number of natural disasters (24) than North Dakota's state average (12). Floods, storms, and snow are the most common of these disasters.

== Demographics ==
Historical population
Census	Pop.	Note	%±
1930	258		—
1940	289		12.0%
1950	282		−2.4%
1960	221		−21.6%
1970	172		−22.2%
1980	164		−4.7%
1990	143		−12.8%
2000	119		−16.8%
2010	82		−31.1%
2020	87		6.1%
2022 (est.)	85		−2.3%
U.S. Decennial Census; 2020 Census

=== 2010 census ===
As of the census of 2010, there were 82 people, 36 households, and 25 families residing in the city. The population density was 109.3 inhabitants per square mile (42.2/km^{2}). There were 61 housing units at an average density of 81.3 per square mile (31.4/km^{2}). The racial makeup of the city was 100.0% White.

There were 36 households, of which 22.2% had children under the age of 18 living with them, 58.3% were married couples living together, 2.8% had a female householder with no husband present, 8.3% had a male householder with no wife present, and 30.6% were non-families. 22.2% of all households were made up of individuals, and 5.6% had someone living alone who was 65 years of age or older. The average household size was 2.28 and the average family size was 2.72.

The median age in the city was 49.3 years. 20.7% of residents were under the age of 18; 3.7% were between the ages of 18 and 24; 14.7% were from 25 to 44; 48.8% were from 45 to 64; and 12.2% were 65 years of age or older. The gender makeup of the city was 56.1% male and 43.9% female.

=== 2000 census ===
As of the census of 2000, there were 119 people, 54 households, and 32 families residing in the city. The population density was 157.5 inhabitants per square mile (60.8/km^{2}). There were 70 housing units at an average density of 92.6 per square mile (35.8/km^{2}). The racial makeup of the city was 100.00% White. Hispanic or Latino of any race were 1.68% of the population.

There were 54 households, out of which 27.8% had children under the age of 18 living with them, 50.0% were married couples living together, 5.6% had a female householder with no husband present, and 38.9% were non-families. 37.0% of all households were made up of individuals, and 16.7% had someone living alone who was 65 years of age or older. The average household size was 2.20 and the average family size was 2.82.

In the city, the population was spread out, with 26.1% under the age of 18, 4.2% from 18 to 24, 30.3% from 25 to 44, 22.7% from 45 to 64, and 16.8% who were 65 years of age or older. The median age was 40 years. For every 100 females, there were 112.5 males. For every 100 females age 18 and over, there were 120.0 males.

The median income for a household in the city was $19,375, and the median income for a family was $42,500. Males had a median income of $31,000 versus $30,625 for females. The per capita income for the city was $14,265. There were 19.2% of families and 26.0% of the population living below the poverty line, including 34.6% of under eighteens and 28.6% of those over 64.

== Transportation ==
Karlsruhe was located along the main line of the Great Northern Railway (today the BNSF Railway).
