= Linton, North Dakota =

- City
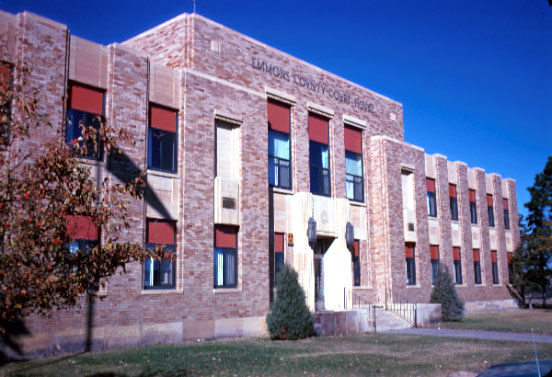
- Emmons County Courthouse in Linton

- Location of Linton, North Dakota
- Coordinates: 46°16′07″N 100°13′58″W
- Country: United States
- State: North Dakota
- County: Emmons
- Founded: 1899

Government
  - Mayor: Daniel Imdieke

Area
  - Total: 0.78 sq mi (2.03 km^{2})
  - Land: 0.78 sq mi (2.03 km^{2})
  - Water: 0 sq mi (0.00 km^{2})
- Elevation: 1,722 ft (525 m)

Population (2020)
  - Total: 1,071
  - Estimate (2022): 1,052
  - Density: 1,364.5/sq mi (526.84/km^{2})
- Time zone: UTC-6 (Central (CST))
  - Summer (DST): UTC-5 (CDT)
- ZIP code: 58552
- Area code: 701
- FIPS code: 38-46980
- GNIS feature ID: 1036132
- Highways: US 83, ND 13
- Website: lintonnd.org

Linton is a city in and the county seat of Emmons County, North Dakota, United States. The population was 1,071 at the 2020 census. When compared with the other 356 cities in North Dakota, Linton ranks in the top twelve percent based on the number of its residents. The city serves as a governmental, commercial and business hub for Emmons County.

A nearby historic site listed on the National Register of Historic Places is Sacred Heart Cemetery, Wrought-Iron Cross Site, in or near Linton.

== History ==
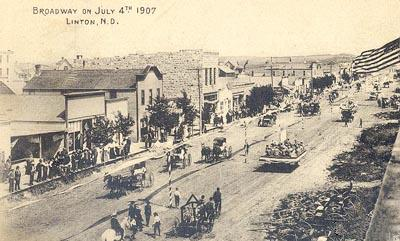
Parade down Broadway, the year after the community was incorporated as a village

In August 1898, land located in the geographic center of Emmons County in Section 7 of Township 132 North, Range 76 West, of the Fifth Principal Meridian, was surveyed and platted by W.E. Petrie into lots, streets and alleys explicitly for the purpose of creating a seat for Emmons County. The site was named Linton, after George W. Lynn, who had settled in Emmons County in 1885. He was a farmer, lawyer, Emmons County's first States Attorney and for a while was the publisher of the Emmons County Free Press. The plat was filed with the register of deeds on December 30, 1898. Linton was incorporated as a village on April 26, 1906; and incorporated as a city on April 6, 1914. Charles Patterson, editor of the Emmons County Republican, was Linton's first postmaster, having received his commission for the post in March 1899.

Linton received its first connection via long-distance telephone in 1905 when the Northwestern Telephone Exchange Company established a line from Fargo to Bismarck and created a branch line to Linton. At the same time Bismarck was connected to the line of the South Dakota system so that each of the communities could communicate with each other in this way.

=== The creation of Linton ===
The creation of Linton was the result of a political dispute between residents in the northern half of Emmons County and those in the southern half. In 1885, two years after the county was officially organized, the county seat was in the town of Williamsport, which was located in the northern half of the county in Township 135N, Range 76W, Section 15 on the east side of what is today 9th Ave. SE between 62nd St. SE and the vacated 63rd St. SE, two and a half miles northeast of Hazelton. The people in the southern half were upset because the county seat was so far away and most of the county leaders were from the north. Moreover, the northern part was more densely settled than the southern part, so this created problems when it came time to vote because the higher population numbers gave "Northerners" greater influence on issues. Eventually, it was decided to take a vote to see if residents favored dividing the county in two. If successful, the northern half would continue to be named Emmons—with Williamsport remaining the county seat—while the southern half would be named Winona with the town of Winona serving as the new county seat of government. When the votes were tallied, residents had decided against splitting the county. However this did not end the dispute, and the effort to move the seat of government from Williamsport to Winona continued. Three votes were taken during the 1880s and 1890s. The first two failed completely. The third resulted in a decision to move the county seat to the center of the county and create a new town, which eventually become the city of Linton. People in the North still wanted to keep the seat at Williamsport, however, so they preferred charges claiming that the election was "fraudulent and illegal", and obtained a court injunction to prevent the move. Southerners became so incensed by this action that they went to Williamsport in January 1899 to take possession of the county records and transfer them to the new county seat. The men were armed, and they met no resistance and took the records, including, according to an account by then-constable John Bartu, a two-ton safe (this safe is now in the collection of the Emmons County Museum in Linton). No charges were brought against the men, although the Williamsport interests succeeded in having the records brought back to their city and causing another election to be ordered which would require the approval of a majority of two-thirds of the voters to have Linton retain its position as county seat (this election was never held). Although the records were brought back to Linton, the case dragged on in the courts for several months, during which time it was expected that it would end up in the state supreme court. The matter was finally settled when E.S. Allen, the attorney for the people of Williamsport, moved that the case be dismissed, whereby the city of Linton prevailed and the seat of Emmons County has remained there ever since. As a result of losing its position as the county seat, and because the Northern Pacific Railway preferred the Linton location when they built a branch to the area in about 1897, Williamsport ceased to exist as a community by the early years of the 20th century and the site today is occupied by farmland.

== Geography ==
According to the United States Census Bureau, the city has a total area of 0.75 square miles (1.94 km^{2}), all land.

=== Climate ===
According to the Köppen Climate Classification system, Linton has a warm-summer humid continental climate, abbreviated "Dfb" on climate maps.

Climate data for Linton, North Dakota, 1991–2020 normals, extremes 1917–2008
Month	Jan	Feb	Mar	Apr	May	Jun	Jul	Aug	Sep	Oct	Nov	Dec	Year
Record high °F (°C)	62 (17)	67 (19)	86 (30)	96 (36)	108 (42)	110 (43)	116 (47)	110 (43)	106 (41)	94 (34)	78 (26)	69 (21)	116 (47)
Mean maximum °F (°C)	44.3 (6.8)	49.2 (9.6)	63.7 (17.6)	80.8 (27.1)	89.3 (31.8)	94.4 (34.7)	100.1 (37.8)	99.9 (37.7)	94.1 (34.5)	82.7 (28.2)	62.7 (17.1)	49.0 (9.4)	102.2 (39.0)
Mean daily maximum °F (°C)	22.0 (−5.6)	27.3 (−2.6)	40.1 (4.5)	55.9 (13.3)	68.9 (20.5)	78.1 (25.6)	84.5 (29.2)	83.5 (28.6)	73.3 (22.9)	56.7 (13.7)	40.5 (4.7)	27.6 (−2.4)	54.9 (12.7)
Daily mean °F (°C)	11.4 (−11.4)	16.3 (−8.7)	29.4 (−1.4)	42.6 (5.9)	56.1 (13.4)	66.4 (19.1)	71.8 (22.1)	69.9 (21.1)	59.8 (15.4)	44.7 (7.1)	29.5 (−1.4)	17.5 (−8.1)	42.9 (6.1)
Mean daily minimum °F (°C)	0.7 (−17.4)	5.2 (−14.9)	18.7 (−7.4)	29.4 (−1.4)	43.3 (6.3)	54.7 (12.6)	59.1 (15.1)	56.4 (13.6)	46.4 (8.0)	32.6 (0.3)	18.6 (−7.4)	7.4 (−13.7)	31.0 (−0.5)
Mean minimum °F (°C)	−28.7 (−33.7)	−23.2 (−30.7)	−9.1 (−22.8)	12.2 (−11.0)	23.8 (−4.6)	36.6 (2.6)	43.0 (6.1)	39.2 (4.0)	25.0 (−3.9)	12.2 (−11.0)	−4.1 (−20.1)	−20.7 (−29.3)	−31.4 (−35.2)
Record low °F (°C)	−44 (−42)	−52 (−47)	−32 (−36)	−12 (−24)	12 (−11)	25 (−4)	30 (−1)	26 (−3)	11 (−12)	−10 (−23)	−31 (−35)	−42 (−41)	−52 (−47)
Average precipitation inches (mm)	0.46 (12)	0.39 (9.9)	0.35 (8.9)	0.99 (25)	2.49 (63)	3.09 (78)	2.85 (72)	1.57 (40)	1.25 (32)	1.86 (47)	0.42 (11)	0.58 (15)	16.30 (414)
Average snowfall inches (cm)	8.9 (23)	6.4 (16)	3.4 (8.6)	2.7 (6.9)	0.5 (1.3)	0.0 (0.0)	0.0 (0.0)	0.0 (0.0)	trace	1.6 (4.1)	6.9 (18)	3.7 (9.4)	34.1 (87.3)
Average precipitation days (≥ 0.01 in)	3.3	3.1	3.5	4.9	9.2	9.7	6.7	6.7	4.5	4.4	2.4	2.8	61.2
Average snowy days (≥ 0.1 in)	3.6	3.1	2.4	0.8	0.1	0.0	0.0	0.0	0.0	0.3	1.9	2.9	15.1
Source 1: NOAA
Source 2: National Weather Service (mean maxima and minima, average precip/snow 1917–2008, precip/snow days 1981–2010)

== Demographics ==
Historical population
Census	Pop.	Note	%±
1910	644		—
1920	1,011		57.0%
1930	1,192		17.9%
1940	1,602		34.4%
1950	1,675		4.6%
1960	1,826		9.0%
1970	1,695		−7.2%
1980	1,561		−7.9%
1990	1,410		−9.7%
2000	1,321		−6.3%
2010	1,097		−17.0%
2020	1,071		−2.4%
2022 (est.)	1,052		−1.8%
U.S. Decennial Census; 2020 Census

=== 2010 census ===
As of the census of 2010, there were 1,097 people, 557 households, and 316 families residing in the city. The population density was 1,462.7 inhabitants per square mile (564.8/km^{2}). There were 642 housing units at an average density of 856.0 per square mile (330.5/km^{2}). The racial makeup of the city was 98.2% White, 0.1% African American, 0.2% Native American, 0.3% Asian, and 1.3% from two or more races. Hispanic or Latino of any race were 0.5% of the population.

There were 557 households, of which 18.5% had children under the age of 18 living with them, 49.9% were married couples living together, 4.7% had a female householder with no husband present, 2.2% had a male householder with no wife present, and 43.3% were non-families. 40.9% of all households were made up of individuals, and 23.2% had someone living alone who was 65 years of age or older. The average household size was 1.97 and the average family size was 2.62.

The median age in the city was 54 years. 17.7% of residents were under the age of 18; 3.9% were between the ages of 18 and 24; 16.1% were from 25 to 44; 29.9% were from 45 to 64; and 32.7% were 65 years of age or older. The gender makeup of the city was 47.5% male and 52.5% female.

=== 2000 census ===
As of the census of 2000, there were 1,321 people, 613 households, and 386 families residing in the city. The population density was 1,791.4 inhabitants per square mile (691.7/km^{2}). There were 701 housing units at an average density of 950.6 per square mile (367.0/km^{2}). The racial makeup of the city was 99.17% White, 0.23% Native American, 0.38% Asian, and 0.23% from two or more races. Hispanic or Latino of any race were 0.68% of the population.

There were 613 households, out of which 24.0% had children under the age of 18 living with them, 53.2% were married couples living together, 6.7% had a female householder with no husband present, and 37.0% were non-families. 34.4% of all households were made up of individuals, and 22.2% had someone living alone who was 65 years of age or older. The average household size was 2.13 and the average family size was 2.74.

In the city, the population was spread out, with 22.2% under the age of 18, 4.1% from 18 to 24, 20.1% from 25 to 44, 21.7% from 45 to 64, and 31.9% who were 65 years of age or older. The median age was 48 years. For every 100 females, there were 89.8 males. For every 100 females age 18 and over, there were 85.9 males.

The median income for a household in the city was $25,750, and the median income for a family was $33,203. Males had a median income of $26,339 versus $14,355 for females. The per capita income for the city was $14,661. About 10.8% of families and 16.7% of the population were below the poverty line, including 14.1% of those under age 18 and 29.6% of those age 65 or over.

== Education ==
It is in the Linton Public School District 36.

== Newspaper ==
The community's oldest newspaper, Emmons County Record, began publication with 75 copies printed on June 10, 1884 in Williamsport but was relocated to Linton by Darwin R. Streeter, its founder. In 1899, Streeter continued as the newspaper's publisher until January 1914, at which time full control of it passed into the hands of his son Frank. The newspaper has been published continuously since the time of its founding.

== Notable people ==
Roman Catholic bishop Austin Anthony Vetter was born in Linton.
