= South Prairie Community Hall =

- Formerly listed on the U.S. National Register of Historic Places
- Location within North Dakota Location within the United States
- Nearest city: Minot, North Dakota
- Coordinates: 48°3′17″N 101°17′57″W
- Area: 2 acres (0.81 ha)
- Built: 1920
- NRHP reference No.: 06000474

Significant dates
- Added to NRHP: June 7, 2006
- Removed from NRHP: March 23, 2026

The South Prairie Community Hall near Minot, North Dakota was built in 1920. It was listed on the National Register of Historic Places in 2006, and was delisted in 2026.

It is the last surviving one of five town and community halls on the prairies south of Minot.
