= Zion Lutheran Cemetery, Wrought-Iron Cross Site =

Historic cemetery in Mercer, McLean County, North Dakota, US

- U.S. National Register of Historic Places
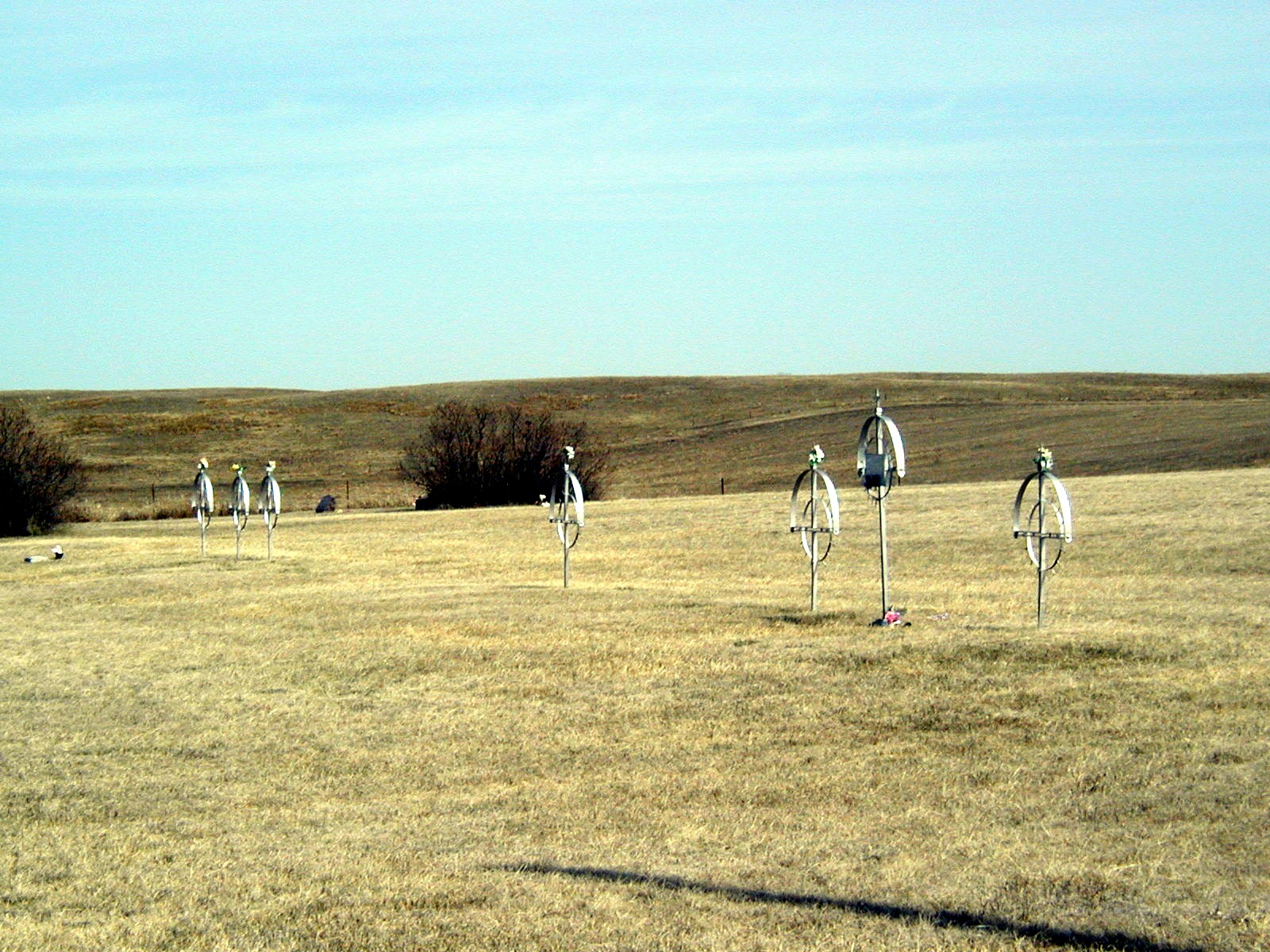
- Location: Address restricted
- Nearest city: Mercer, North Dakota
- Area: less than one acre
- Built by: Rennich, Carl
- Architectural style: Wrought-iron cross
- MPS: German-Russian Wrought-Iron Cross Sites in Central North Dakota MPS
- NRHP reference No.: 89001684
- Added to NRHP: October 23, 1989

The Zion Lutheran Cemetery, Wrought-Iron Cross Site, near Mercer, North Dakota, United States, was listed on the National Register of Historic Places in 1989. It includes wrought-iron crosses. The listing included seven contributing objects.

It includes work by Carl Rennich, of Mercer. Rennich was one of a number of "German-Russian blacksmiths in central North Dakota" who developed individual styles in their crosses and whose "work was known for miles around them."
