= Selz, North Dakota =

- Census-designated place & Unincorporated community
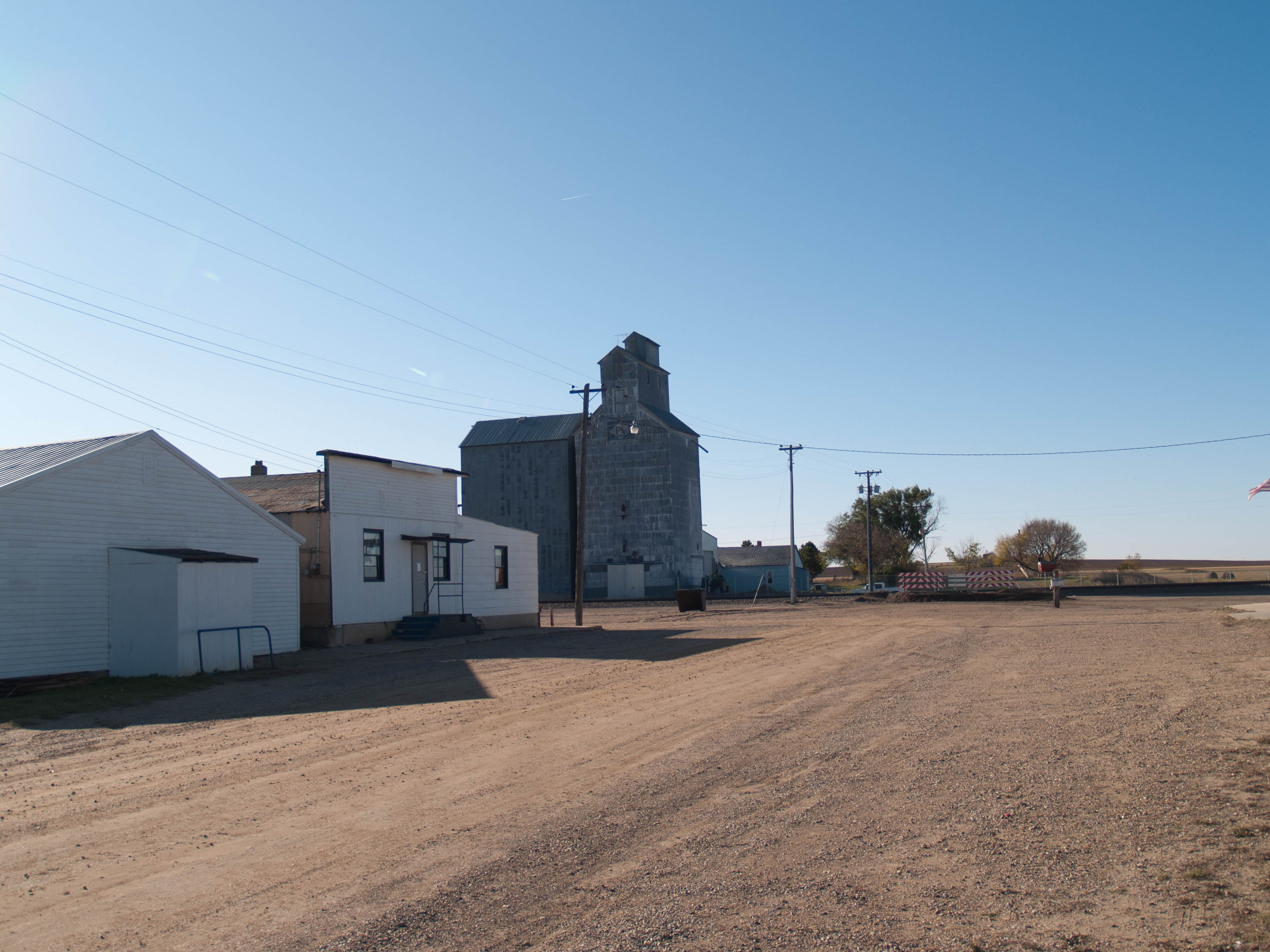
- Buildings in Selz

- Location within North Dakota
- Coordinates: 47°51′34″N 99°53′36″W
- Country: United States
- State: North Dakota
- County: Pierce

Area
  - Total: 0.14 sq mi (0.35 km^{2})
  - Land: 0.14 sq mi (0.35 km^{2})
  - Water: 0 sq mi (0.00 km^{2})
- Elevation: 1,604 ft (489 m)

Population (2020)
  - Total: 40
  - Density: 292.2/sq mi (112.83/km^{2})
- Time zone: UTC-6 (Central (CST))
  - Summer (DST): UTC-5 (CDT)
- ZIP code: 58341
- Area code: 701
- FIPS code: 38-71700
- GNIS feature ID: 2584356

Selz is a census-designated place and unincorporated community in Pierce County, North Dakota, United States. Its population was 40 as of the 2020 census.

St. Boniface Cemetery, Wrought-Iron Cross Site, near Selz, is listed on the National Register of Historic Places.

== Geography ==
According to the United States Census Bureau, the CDP has a total area of 0.14 square miles (0.36 km^{2}), all land.

== Demographics ==
Historical population
Census	Pop.	Note	%±
2020	40		—
U.S. Decennial Census

=== 2010 census ===
As of the census of 2010, there were 46 people, 23 households, and 11 families in the CDP. The population density was 335.8 inhabitants per square mile (129.7/km^{2}). There were 30 housing units at an average density of 219.0 per square mile (84.6/km^{2}). The racial makeup of the CDP was 97.8% White, and 2.2% Asian.

There were 23 households, of which 21.7% had children under the age of 18 living with them, 34.8% were married couples living together, 4.3% had a female householder with no husband present, 8.7% had a male householder with no wife present, and 52.2% were non-families. 47.8% of all households were made up of individuals, and 17.4% had someone living alone who was 65 years of age or older. The average household size was 2.00 and the average family size was 3.00.

The median age in the CDP was 45.0 years. 21.7% of residents were under the age of 18; 4.3% were between the ages of 18 and 24; 23.9% were from 25 to 44; 32.6% were from 45 to 64; and 17.4% were 65 years of age or older. The gender makeup of the CDP was 54.3% male and 45.7% female.

== See also ==
- Selz, Ukraine
