= Tolley, North Dakota =

- City
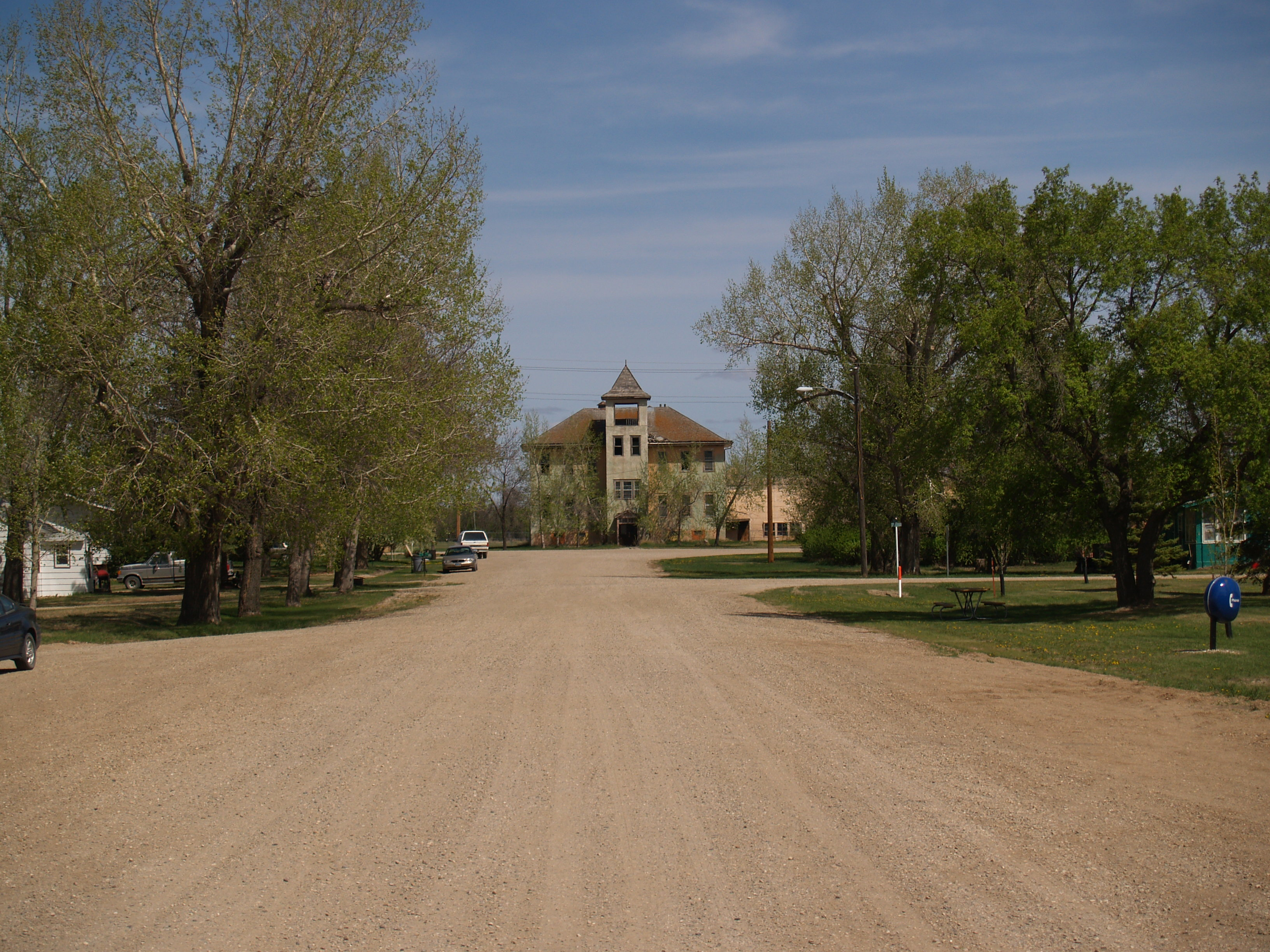
- Street in Tolley North Dakota

- Location of Tolley, North Dakota
- Coordinates: 48°43′49″N 101°49′38″W
- Country: United States
- State: North Dakota
- County: Renville
- Founded: 1905

Government
  - Mayor: Rick Tohm

Area
  - Total: 0.12 sq mi (0.32 km^{2})
  - Land: 0.12 sq mi (0.32 km^{2})
  - Water: 0 sq mi (0.00 km^{2})
- Elevation: 1,850 ft (560 m)

Population (2020)
  - Total: 41
  - Density: 327.2/sq mi (126.33/km^{2})
- Time zone: UTC-6 (CST)
  - Summer (DST): UTC-5 (CDT)
- ZIP code: 58787
- Area code: 701
- FIPS code: 38-79140
- GNIS feature ID: 1036296

Tolley is a city in Renville County, North Dakota, United States. The population was 41 at the 2020 census. It is part of the Minot Micropolitan Statistical Area. Tolley was founded by Eli Crane Tolley in 1905.

== Geography ==
According to the United States Census Bureau, the city has a total area of 0.13 square miles (0.34 km^{2}), all land.

== Demographics ==
Historical population
| Census | Pop. | Note | %± |
|---|---|---|---|
| 1910 | 250 | | — |
| 1920 | 325 | | 30.0% |
| 1930 | 225 | | −30.8% |
| 1940 | 177 | | −21.3% |
| 1950 | 248 | | 40.1% |
| 1960 | 189 | | −23.8% |
| 1970 | 163 | | −13.8% |
| 1980 | 103 | | −36.8% |
| 1990 | 79 | | −23.3% |
| 2000 | 63 | | −20.3% |
| 2010 | 47 | | −25.4% |
| 2020 | 41 | | −12.8% |
| 2021 (est.) | 40 | | −2.4% |
U.S. Decennial Census; 2020 Census

=== 2010 census ===
As of the census of 2010, there were 47 people, 26 households, and 13 families residing in the city. The population density was 361.5 inhabitants per square mile (139.6/km^{2}). There were 40 housing units at an average density of 307.7 per square mile (118.8/km^{2}). The racial makeup of the city was 100.0% White.

There were 26 households, of which 11.5% had children under the age of 18 living with them, 46.2% were married couples living together, 3.8% had a female householder with no husband present, and 50.0% were non-families. 46.2% of all households were made up of individuals, and 7.6% had someone living alone who was 65 years of age or older. The average household size was 1.81 and the average family size was 2.54.

The median age in the city was 48.3 years. 12.8% of residents were under the age of 18; 2.2% were between the ages of 18 and 24; 29.8% were from 25 to 44; 34.1% were from 45 to 64; and 21.3% were 65 years of age or older. The gender makeup of the city was 61.7% male and 38.3% female.

=== 2000 census ===
As of the census of 2000, there were 63 people, 32 households, and 15 families residing in the city. The population density was 490.9 inhabitants per square mile (189.5/km^{2}). There were 39 housing units at an average density of 303.9 per square mile (117.3/km^{2}). The racial makeup of the city was 85.71% White, 7.94% Native American, and 6.35% from two or more races.

There were 32 households, out of which 15.6% had children under the age of 18 living with them, 46.9% were married couples living together, and 53.1% were non-families. 46.9% of all households were made up of individuals, and 21.9% had someone living alone who was 65 years of age or older. The average household size was 1.97 and the average family size was 2.93.

In the city, the population was spread out, with 20.6% under the age of 18, 1.6% from 18 to 24, 27.0% from 25 to 44, 28.6% from 45 to 64, and 22.2% who were 65 years of age or older. The median age was 46 years. For every 100 females, there were 133.3 males. For every 100 females age 18 and over, there were 127.3 males.

The median income for a household in the city was $18,750, and the median income for a family was $18,750. Males had a median income of $23,750 versus $18,125 for females. The per capita income for the city was $9,835. There were 20.0% of families and 39.4% of the population living below the poverty line, including 84.6% of under eighteens and 63.6% of those over 64.

== Climate ==
This climatic region is typified by large seasonal temperature differences, with warm to hot (and often humid) summers and cold (sometimes severely cold) winters. According to the Köppen Climate Classification system, Tolley has a humid continental climate, abbreviated "Dfb" on climate maps.
