= Tirsbol Cemetery, Wrought-Iron Cross Site =

Historic cemetery in Emmons County, North Dakota, US

- U.S. National Register of Historic Places
- Location within North Dakota Location within the United States
- Nearest city: Strasburg, North Dakota
- Coordinates: 46.1588745°N 100.1484811°W
- Area: less than one acre
- Built by: Keller, Paul
- Architectural style: Wrought-iron cross
- MPS: German-Russian Wrought-Iron Cross Sites in Central North Dakota MPS
- NRHP reference No.: 89001698
- Added to NRHP: October 23, 1989

The Tirsbol Cemetery, Wrought-Iron Cross Site (also known as Tiraspol Cemetery), near Strasburg, North Dakota, United States, is a historic site that was listed on the National Register of Historic Places in 1989. It includes wrought-iron crosses. It includes work by blacksmith Paul Keller. The listing included three contributing objects.

Paul Keller, of Hague, was one of a number of "German-Russian blacksmiths in central North Dakota" who developed individual styles in their crosses and whose "work was known for miles around them."
