= Galchutt, North Dakota =

- Unincorporated community
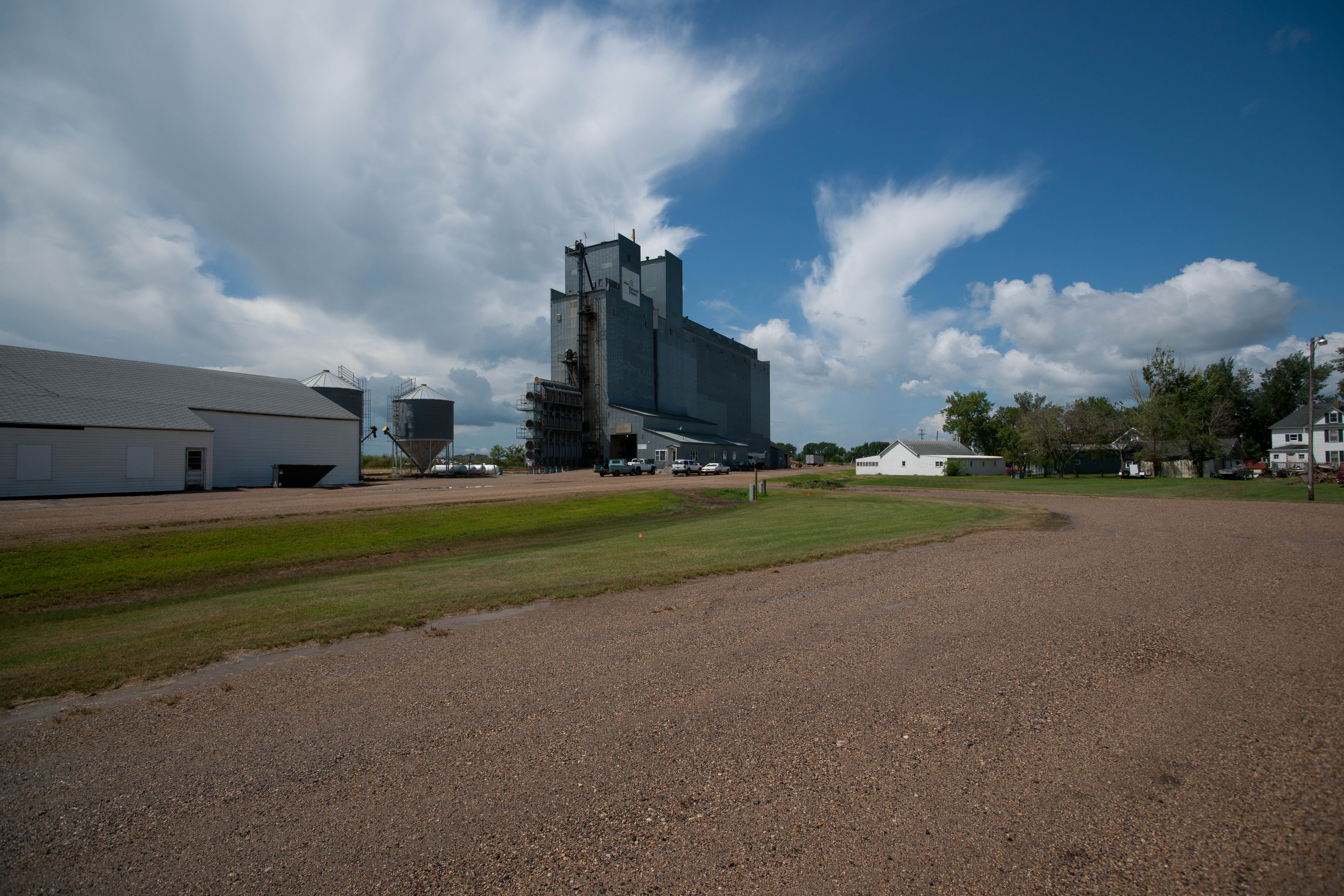
- Looking north at Galchutt

- Location within North Dakota Location within the United States
- Coordinates: 46°23′15″N 96°48′34″W
- Country: United States
- State: North Dakota
- County: Richland
- Elevation: 951 ft (290 m)
- Time zone: UTC-6 (Central (CST))
  - Summer (DST): UTC-5 (CDT)
- Area code: 701
- GNIS feature ID: 1029073

Galchutt is an unincorporated community in Richland County, North Dakota, United States. Galchutt is located along the Red River Valley and Western Railroad 12.9 miles (20.8 km), northwest of Wahpeton.

== History ==
The village of Galchutt took its name from the owner Hans Galchutt. He first built a home, store and grain warehouse in the area in 1882. The population was 65 in 1940.
