= Coulee, Mountrail County, North Dakota =

Coulee, North Dakota
- Unincorporated community
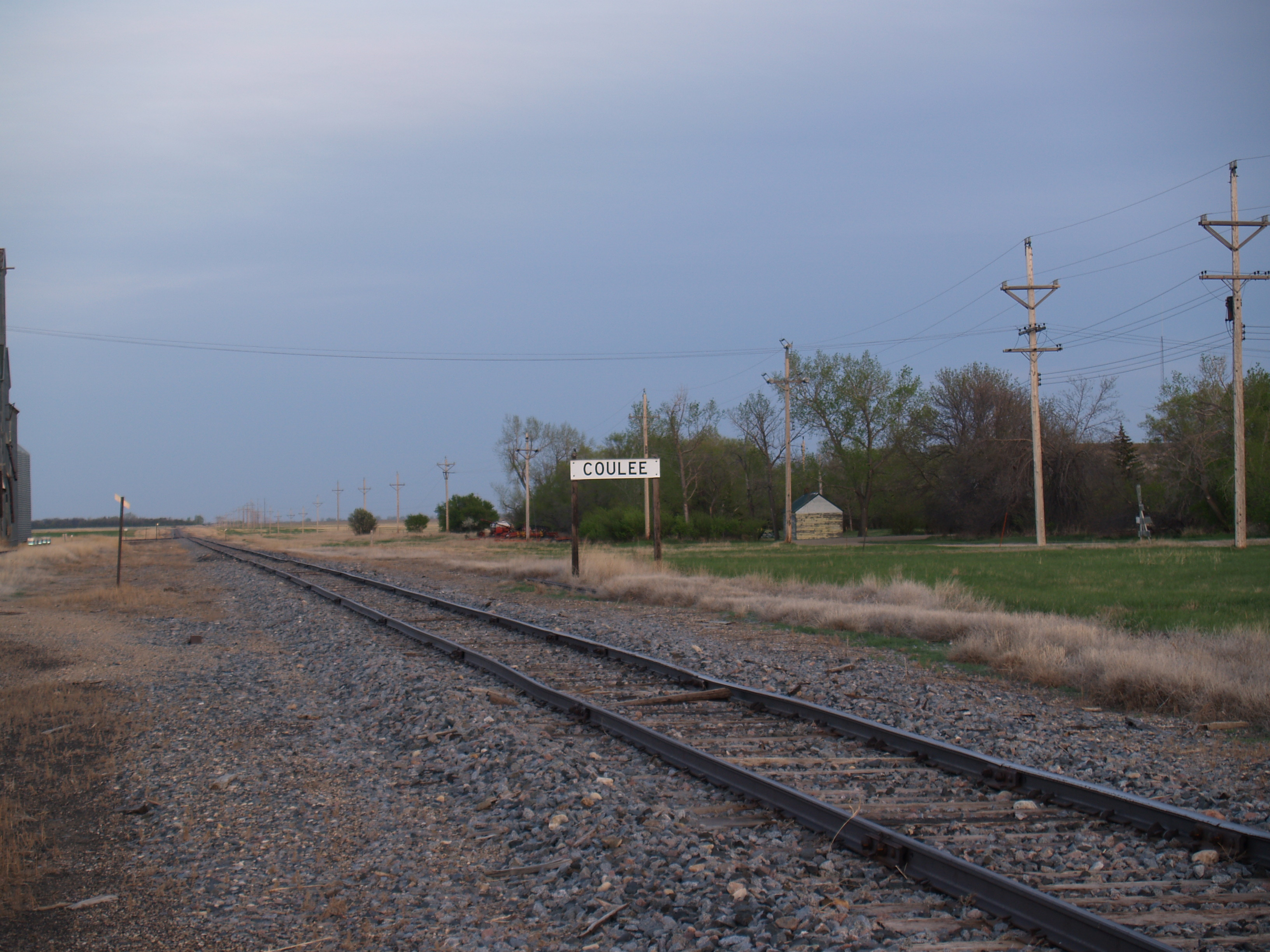
- Railroad in Coulee

- Location within North Dakota Location within the United States
- Coordinates: 48°32′43″N 102°00′42″W
- Country: United States
- State: North Dakota
- County: Mountrail
- Elevation: 2,064 ft (629 m)
- Time zone: UTC-6 (Central (CST))
  - Summer (DST): UTC-5 (CDT)
- Area code: 701
- GNIS feature ID: 1028477

Coulee is an unincorporated community in Mountrail County, North Dakota, United States, on the border of Ward County.

It is the location of Our Savior's Scandinavian Lutheran Church, which is listed on the U.S. National Register of Historic Places.

== History ==
The population was 82 in 1940.
