= St. Mathias Cemetery, Wrought-Iron Cross Site =

Historic cemetery in Pierce County, North Dakota, US

Coordinates: 48°04′17″N 100°10′12″W

- U.S. National Register of Historic Places
- Location within North Dakota Location within the United States
- Nearest city: Orrin, North Dakota
- Area: less than one acre
- Built by: Joseph P. Klein, John Krim
- Architectural style: Wrought-iron cross
- MPS: German-Russian Wrought-Iron Cross Sites in Central North Dakota MPS
- NRHP reference No.: 89001680
- Added to NRHP: October 23, 1989

The St. Mathias Cemetery, Wrought-Iron Cross Site is a historic site near Orrin, North Dakota, United States, that was listed on the National Register of Historic Places in 1989. It is a site of wrought-iron crosses and includes work by blacksmith Joseph P. Klein and by blacksmith John Krim. The NRHP listing included 42 contributing objects.

Joseph P. Klein and John Krim were both of Pierce County. They were among a number of "German-Russian blacksmiths in central North Dakota" who developed individual styles in their crosses and whose "work was known for miles around them."
