= Our Savior's Scandinavian Lutheran Church =

Historic church in Ward County, North Dakota

- U.S. National Register of Historic Places
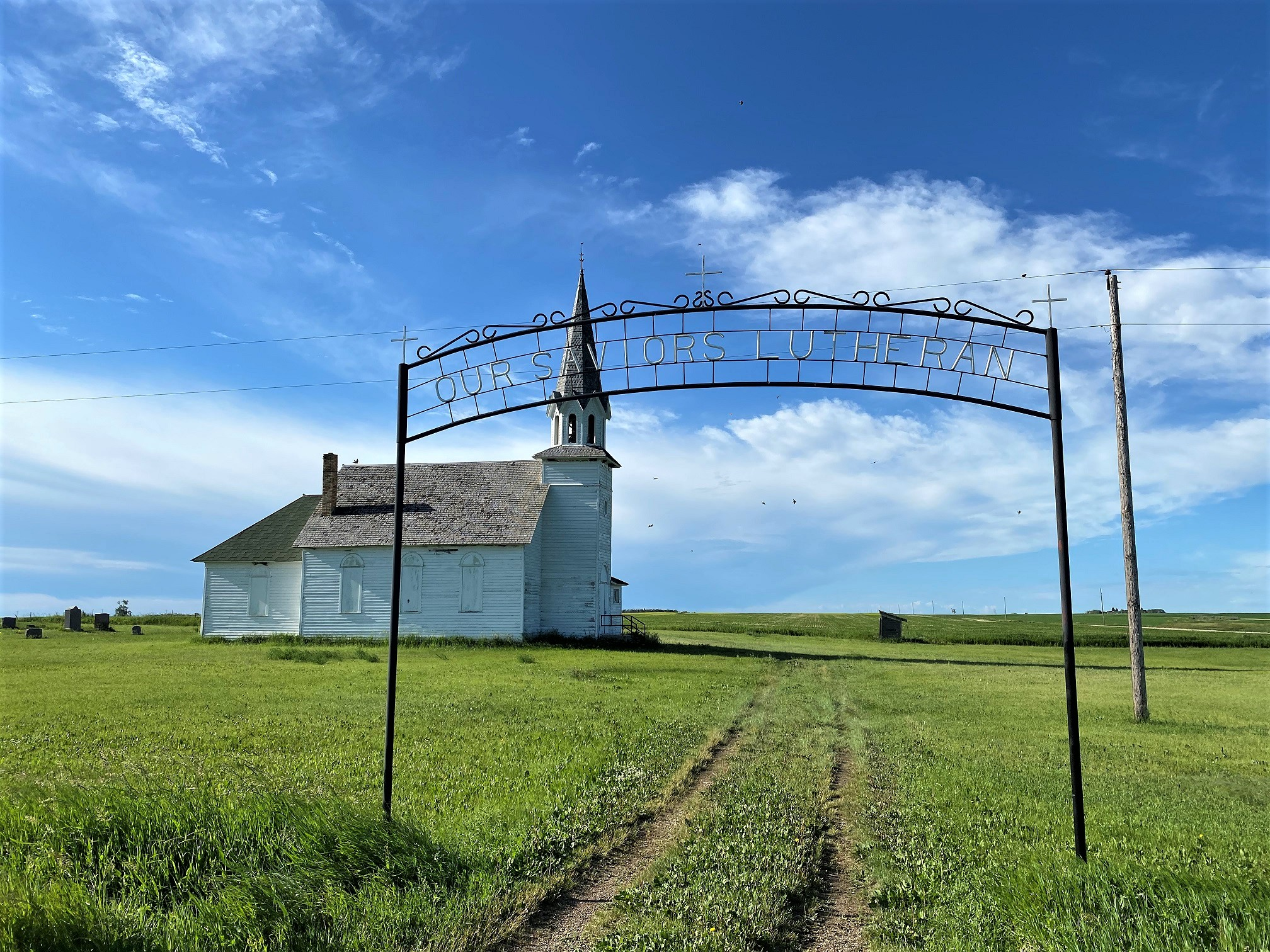

- Location within North Dakota Location within the United States
- Location: 1 mi. N of NM 50 and 0.25 mi. W of Ward Cty Hwy 1, Coulee, North Dakota
- Coordinates: 48°33′37″N 102°08′05″W
- Area: 2.2 acres (0.89 ha)
- Built: 1907
- Built by: Harald M. Grenvik
- Architect: Harald M. Grenvik
- Architectural style: Romanesque Revival
- NRHP reference No.: 05000060
- Added to NRHP: February 15, 2005

Our Savior's Scandinavian Lutheran Church, also known as Our Savior's Lutheran Church or Our Savior's Evangelical Lutheran Church, is located in Ward County, North Dakota . It is situated one mile north of State Route #50 and one quarter mile west of Ward County Highway #1 near Coulee, Mountrail County, North Dakota. The church and its cemetery were listed on the National Register of Historic Places in 2005.

The single-story, wood-framed building has a vernacular front-gabled form with a vestibule tower in front. The church was built in 1907 by Harald M. Grenvik, Sr. (1883–1963) who later built several other churches in the region. The church was created to serve the Norwegian and Swedish immigrant communities. It remained a significant religious center of the surrounding community until its closing service in 1962.

Our Savior's is maintained by Our Savior's Lutheran Cemetery Association which was formed in 1971 . Our Savior's Evangelical Lutheran Cemetery was started in 1931 and contains 131 graves.
