= Berwick, North Dakota =

Place in North Dakota, U.S.

Coordinates: 48°21′40″N 100°14′47″W

Berwick is a populated place in McHenry County, North Dakota, United States.

Historical population
Census	Pop.	Note	%±
1940	92		—
1950	71		−22.8%
1960	56		−21.1%
1970	33		−41.1%
1980	22		−33.3%
U.S. Decennial Census

It is the nearest community to St. Anselm's Cemetery, Wrought-Iron Cross Site, or at least was the most salient when that historic site was listed on the National Register of Historic Places in 1989.

== History ==
The population was 175 in 1940.

== Transportation ==
Amtrak’s Empire Builder, which operates between Seattle/Portland and Chicago, passes through the town on BNSF tracks, but makes no stop. The nearest station is located in Rugby, 13 miles (21 km) to the east.
