= Old Saint John Nepomocene Cemetery, Wrought-Iron Cross Site =

Historic site in North Dakota

- U.S. National Register of Historic Places
- Location within North Dakota Location within the United States
- Nearest city: Orrin, North Dakota
- Coordinates: 48.094118°N 100.166970°W
- Area: less than one acre
- Architectural style: Wrought-iron cross
- MPS: German-Russian Wrought-Iron Cross Sites in Central North Dakota MPS
- NRHP reference No.: 89001683
- Added to NRHP: October 23, 1989

The Old Saint John Nepomocene Cemetery, Wrought-Iron Cross Site is a historic site near Orrin, North Dakota that includes wrought-iron crosses. It was listed on the National Register of Historic Places in 1989. The listing included 62 contributing objects.

No individual specific blacksmith is identified in the National Register database listing for this site, but in other iron cross sites the work can be traced to specific "German-Russian blacksmiths in central North Dakota" who developed individual styles in their crosses and whose "work was known for miles around them."
