= Orrin, North Dakota =

- Census-designated place & Unincorporated community
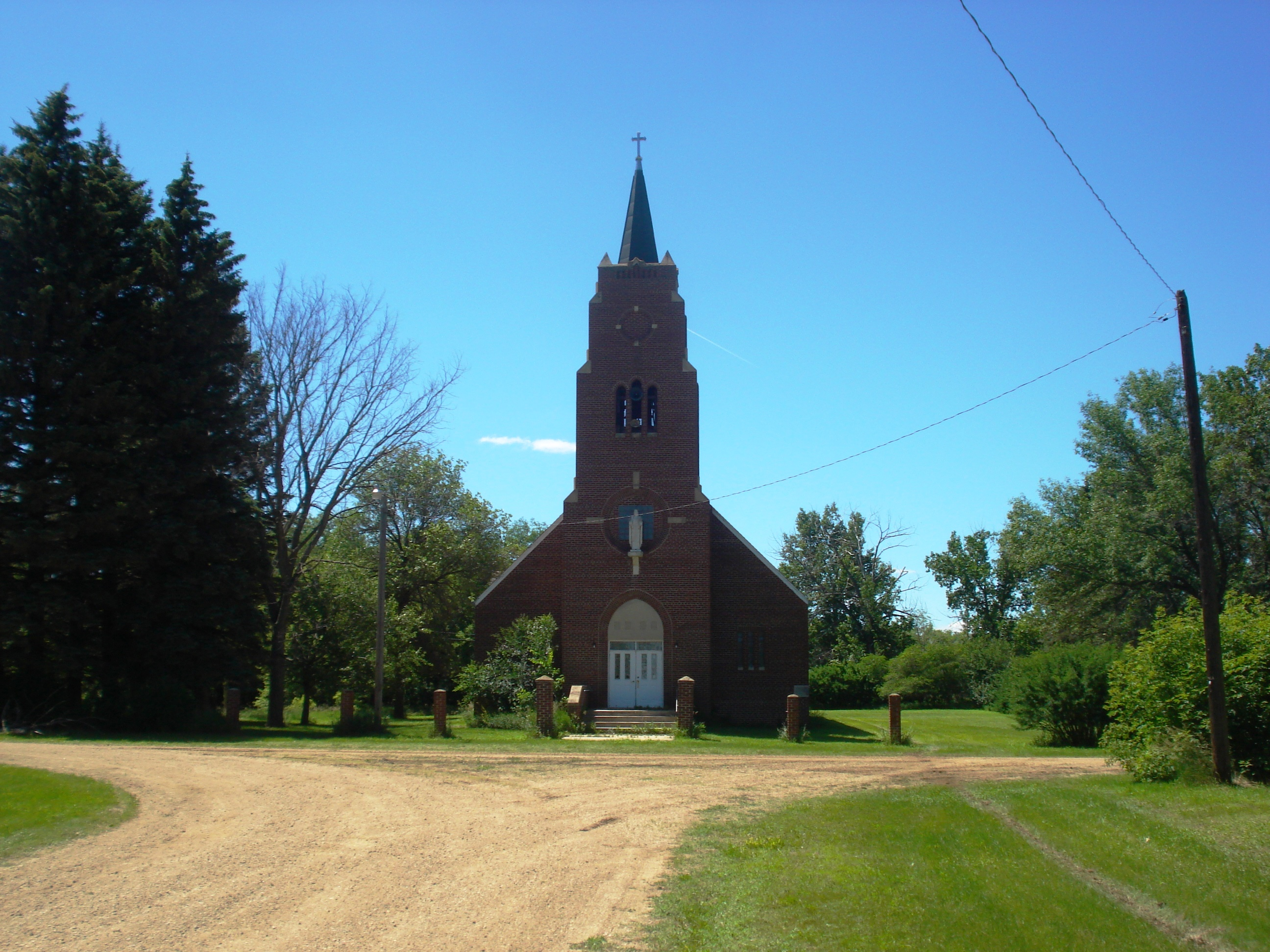
- Sacred Heart Catholic Church

- Location within North Dakota
- Coordinates: 48°05′27″N 100°10′02″W
- Country: United States
- State: North Dakota
- County: Pierce

Area
  - Total: 0.23 sq mi (0.60 km^{2})
  - Land: 0.23 sq mi (0.60 km^{2})
  - Water: 0 sq mi (0.00 km^{2})
- Elevation: 1,562 ft (476 m)

Population (2020)
  - Total: 7
  - Density: 30.5/sq mi (11.76/km^{2})
- Time zone: UTC-6 (Central (CST))
  - Summer (DST): UTC-5 (CDT)
- ZIP code: 58368
- Area code: 701
- FIPS code: 38-59820
- GNIS feature ID: 2584353

Orrin is a census-designated place and unincorporated community in Pierce County, North Dakota, United States. As of the 2020 census, Orrin had a population of 7.

Old Saint John Nepomocene Cemetery, Wrought-Iron Cross Site and St. Mathias Cemetery, Wrought-Iron Cross Site, both in or near Orrin, are listed on the National Register of Historic Places.

== Geography ==
According to the United States Census Bureau, the CDP has a total area of 0.23 square miles (0.60 km^{2}), all land.

== Demographics ==
Historical population
Census	Pop.	Note	%±
2020	7		—
U.S. Decennial Census

=== 2010 census ===
As of the census of 2010, there were 22 people, 5 households, and 5 families residing in the CDP. The population density was 95.7 inhabitants per square mile (36.9/km^{2}). There were 17 housing units at an average density of 73.9 per square mile (28.5/km^{2}). The racial makeup of the CDP was 77.3% White, and 22.7% African American.

There were 5 households, of which 80.0% had children under the age of 18 living with them, 40.0% were married couples living together, 20.0% had a female householder with no husband present, and 40.0% had a male householder with no wife present. 0.0% of all households were made up of individuals. The average household size was 4.40 and the average family size was 4.20.

The median age in the CDP was 17.3 years. 59.1% of residents were under the age of 18; 4.5% were between the ages of 18 and 24; 18.2% were from 25 to 44; 9.1% were from 45 to 64; and 9.1% were 65 years of age or older. The gender makeup of the CDP was 63.6% male and 36.4% female.

== Education ==
It is within Rugby Public Schools, which operates Rugby High School.
