= National Register of Historic Places listings in Burleigh County, North Dakota =

Location of Burleigh County in North Dakota

This is a list of the National Register of Historic Places listings in Burleigh County, North Dakota.

This is intended to be a complete list of the properties and districts on the National Register of Historic Places in Burleigh County, North Dakota, United States. The locations of National Register properties and districts for which the latitude and longitude coordinates are included below, may be seen in a map.

There are 28 properties and districts listed on the National Register in the county, including 1 National Historic Landmark. Another 5 properties were once listed but have been removed.

Contents: Counties in North Dakota
Adams | Barnes | Benson | Billings | Bottineau | Bowman | Burke | Burleigh | Cass | Cavalier | Dickey | Divide | Dunn | Eddy | Emmons | Foster | Golden Valley | Grand Forks | Grant | Griggs | Hettinger | Kidder | LaMoure | Logan | McHenry | McIntosh | McKenzie | McLean | Mercer | Morton | Mountrail | Nelson | Oliver | Pembina | Pierce | Ramsey | Ransom | Renville | Richland | Rolette | Sargent | Sheridan | Sioux | Slope | Stark | Steele | Stutsman | Towner | Traill | Walsh | Ward | Wells | Williams

This National Park Service list is complete through NPS recent listings posted August 28, 2026.

== Current listings ==
	Name on the Register	Image	Date listed	Location	City or town	Description
1	Bismarck Cathedral Area Historic District	Bismarck Cathedral Area Historic District	May 8, 1980 (#80002908)	Roughly bounded by Hannifan and N. 1st Sts. and Aves. C and A, W.; also roughly along N. 1st, N. Mandan, N. Washington, and N. Raymond Sts., and Aves. C, D, and E, W.; also 104, 106, 112, 115, 116, and 120 E. Ave B and 523 N. 1st St. (but removing 316 and 320 W. Ave. A and 510 N. Washington St.); 46°48′37″N 100°47′36″W	Bismarck	Second and third sets of addresses represent boundary increases
2	Bismarck Civic Auditorium	Bismarck Civic Auditorium	June 7, 1976 (#76001351)	201 N. 6th St. 46°48′24″N 100°46′56″W	Bismarck	
3	Bismarck Tribune Building	Bismarck Tribune Building	October 22, 1982 (#82001309)	22 N. 4th St. 46°48′26″N 100°47′10″W	Bismarck	
4	Dr. Albert M. and Evelyn M. Brandt House	Dr. Albert M. and Evelyn M. Brandt House	August 16, 2000 (#00000992)	323 E. Ave. B 46°48′01″N 100°47′09″W	Bismarck	
5	Burleigh County Courthouse	Burleigh County Courthouse	November 14, 1985 (#85002980)	E. Thayer Ave. 46°48′28″N 100°47′01″W	Bismarck	
6	Patrick E. Byrne House		August 4, 2025 (#100012055)	120 W. Ave. A 46°48′35″N 100°47′31″W	Bismarck	
7	Camp Hancock Site	Camp Hancock Site	February 23, 1972 (#72001004)	101 Main Ave. 46°48′19″N 100°47′30″W	Bismarck	
8	Chief Looking's Village site (32BL3)	Chief Looking's Village site (32BL3)	November 21, 1978 (#78001990)	Eastern edge of Pioneer Park; 46°49′49″N 100°49′46″W	Bismarck	
9	Depression Era Work Relief Construction Features at Double Ditch Indian Village Site State Historic Site	Depression Era Work Relief Construction Features at Double Ditch Indian Village Site State Historic Site	November 5, 2014 (#14000896)	ND 1804; 46°56′11″N 100°54′04″W	Bismarck vicinity	Federal Relief Construction in North Dakota, 1931-1943, MPS
10	Depression Era Work Relief Construction Features at Menoken State Historic Site	Depression Era Work Relief Construction Features at Menoken State Historic Site	December 7, 2010 (#10000998)	171st St. and 32nd Ave. NE; 1.7 miles north of Menoken; 46°50′29″N 100°31′07″W	Menoken vicinity	Federal Relief Construction in North Dakota, 1931-1943, MPS
11	Double Ditch Earth Lodge Village Site (32BL8)	Double Ditch Earth Lodge Village Site (32BL8)	January 29, 1979 (#79001769)	Left bank of the Missouri River above Bismarck; 46°56′12″N 100°54′04″W	Bismarck vicinity	
12	Downtown Bismarck Historic District	Downtown Bismarck Historic District	October 28, 2001 (#01001188)	Roughly bounded by Broadway and Thayer Aves., 5th St., Burlington and Santa Fe railroad line, and Washington and 2nd Sts. 46°48′12″N 100°47′23″W	Bismarck	
13	Florence Lake School No. 3		November 1, 2011 (#11000786)	10 miles north of Wing off ND 14; 47°16′20″N 100°17′01″W	Wing vicinity	
14	Former North Dakota Executive Mansion	Former North Dakota Executive Mansion	April 16, 1975 (#75001301)	320 Ave. B, E. 46°48′40″N 100°47′10″W	Bismarck	
15	Fred and Gladys Grady House	Fred and Gladys Grady House	July 21, 2006 (#06000636)	414 E. Ave. F 46°48′56″N 100°47′05″W	Bismarck	
16	Highland Acres Historic District		July 6, 2022 (#100007875)	Roughly bounded by Shafer St., Edwards Ave., the axis of Williams St., and South Highland Acres Rd.; plus either side of Arthur Dr. 46°49′02″N 100°48′45″W	Bismarck	Second set of addresses represent a boundary increase approved July 1, 2024.
17	Oliver and Gertrude Lundquist House	Oliver and Gertrude Lundquist House	July 21, 2006 (#06000637)	622 W. Thayer St. 46°48′29″N 100°48′00″W	Bismarck	
18	Menoken Indian Village Site	Menoken Indian Village Site	October 15, 1966 (#66000599)	171 St. at 32nd Ave., NE. 46°50′28″N 100°31′06″W	Menoken vicinity	
19	Northern Pacific Railway Depot	Northern Pacific Railway Depot	September 19, 1977 (#77001022)	407 E. Main Ave. 46°48′18″N 100°47′07″W	Bismarck	
20	Our Lady of the Annunciation Chapel at Annunciation Priory	Our Lady of the Annunciation Chapel at Annunciation Priory	June 16, 2020 (#100005177)	7500 University Dr. (University of Mary); 46°43′18″N 100°45′14″W	Bismarck	
21	Patterson Hotel	Patterson Hotel	December 8, 1976 (#76001352)	422 E. Main Ave. 46°48′21″N 100°47′05″W	Bismarck	
22	E. G. Patterson Building	E. G. Patterson Building	October 22, 1982 (#82001310)	412-414 Main St. 46°48′20″N 100°47′05″W	Bismarck	
23	St. George's Episcopal Memorial Church	St. George's Episcopal Memorial Church	October 5, 2021 (#100007065)	601 North 4th St. 46°48′39″N 100°47′10″W	Bismarck	
24	Soo Hotel	Soo Hotel	May 9, 1983 (#83001927)	112-114 5th St., N. 46°48′21″N 100°47′05″W	Bismarck	
25	Towne-Williams House	Towne-Williams House	April 14, 1975 (#75001302)	722 7th St., N. 46°48′45″N 100°46′53″W	Bismarck	
26	U.S. Post Office and Courthouse	U.S. Post Office and Courthouse	June 23, 1976 (#76001353)	304 E. Broadway; 46°48′25″N 100°47′13″W	Bismarck	
27	Van Horn Hotel	Van Horn Hotel	May 10, 1984 (#84002759)	114 N. 3rd St. 46°48′22″N 100°47′16″W	Bismarck	
28	Webb Brothers Block	Webb Brothers Block	October 13, 1983 (#83004060)	317 E. Main Ave. 46°48′19″N 100°47′11″W	Bismarck	

== Former listings ==
	Name on the Register	Image	Date listed	Date removed	Location	City or town	Description
1	Bismarck Public Library		December 7, 1977 (#77001020)	June 12, 1980	519 E. Thayer Ave.	Bismarck	Demolished in May 1980.
2	Fire Hall		February 14, 1978 (#78001989)	June 12, 1980	517 E. Thayer Ave.	Bismarck	Demolished in May 1980.
3	James W. Foley House		September 13, 1977 (#77001021)	January 31, 1994	522 6th St.(Original location. Current location:); 46°48′26″N 100°43′36″W	Bismarck	Delisted due to relocation to the Missouri Valley Fairgrounds on November 19, 1993.
4	Liberty Memorial Bridge	Liberty Memorial Bridge	March 11, 1997 (#97000172)	March 25, 2009	Interstate 94 business loop, across the Missouri River; 46°48′28″N 100°49′21″W	Bismarck	Imploded on October 6, 2008.
5	Yegen House and Pioneer Grocery		October 5, 1977 (#77001023)	February 1, 2011	808-810 E. Main Ave.(Original location. Current location:); 46°48′25″N 100°43′32″W	Bismarck	Delisted due to relocation to the Missouri Valley Fairgrounds on April 20, 1993.

== See also ==
- List of National Historic Landmarks in North Dakota
- National Register of Historic Places listings in North Dakota
