= Foley Building =

Foley Building or Foley House may refer to:

in Canada

Foley House, in Westport, Ontario, Canada, home of Canada's first Prime Minister, Sir John A. Macdonald.

in the United States

- Jennie Foley Building, Chicago, Illinois, listed on the National Register of Historic Places (NRHP)
- Stephan A. Foley House, Lincoln, Illinois, NRHP-listed
- Foley Hall, St. Mary-of-the-Woods, Indiana, NRHP-listed in Vigo County, Indiana
- John Foley House, New Hampton, Iowa, NRHP-listed in Iowa
- Michael Foley Cottage, Stoneham, Massachusetts, NRHP-listed
- Foley-Brower-Bohmer House, St. Cloud, Minnesota, NRHP-listed in Stearns County, Minnesota
- James W. Foley House, Bismarck, North Dakota, NRHP-listed
- Foley Building (La Grande, Oregon), NRHP-listed in Union County, Oregon
- Foley's department store of Houston, Texas
- W. L. Foley Building, Houston, Texas, NRHP-listed

== See also ==
- Foley (disambiguation)
