= Eddy County Courthouse =

- U.S. National Register of Historic Places
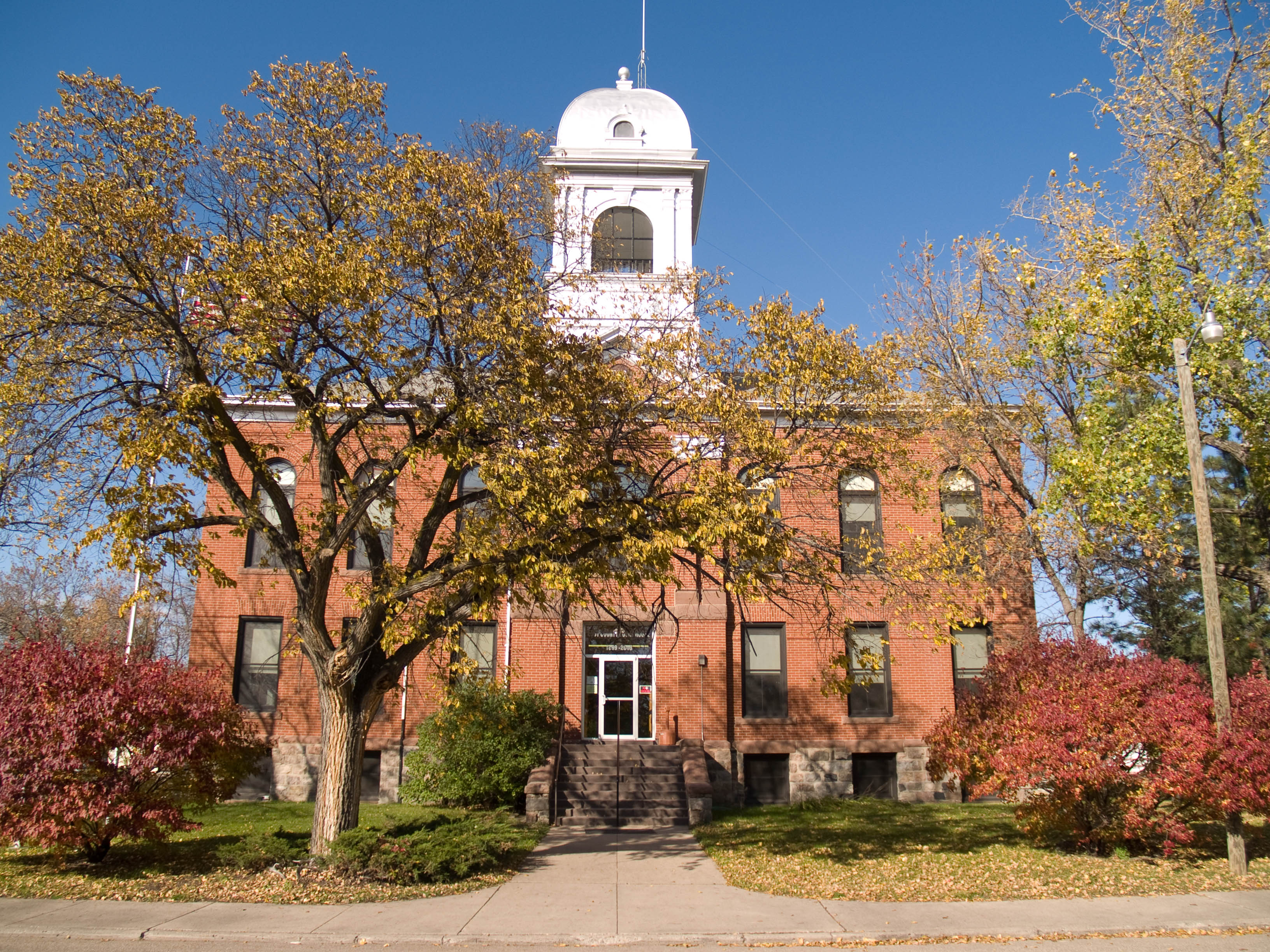
- The courthouse in 2008

- Location within North Dakota Location within the United States
- Interactive map showing the location of Eddy County Courthouse
- Location: 524 Central Ave., New Rockford, North Dakota
- Coordinates: 47°40′49″N 99°8′3″W
- Area: less than one acre
- Built: 1899-1900
- Built by: Moran, M.J.
- Architect: M.E. Beebe
- MPS: North Dakota County Courthouses TR
- NRHP reference No.: 85002981
- Added to NRHP: November 14, 1985

The Eddy County Courthouse in New Rockford, North Dakota was built during 1899–1900. Designed by M.E. Beebe, the building is architecturally significant as "an outstanding example to the community of monumental public architecture". At the time of its National Register nomination in 1985, it was in "pristine condition".

It was listed on the National Register of Historic Places in 1985.

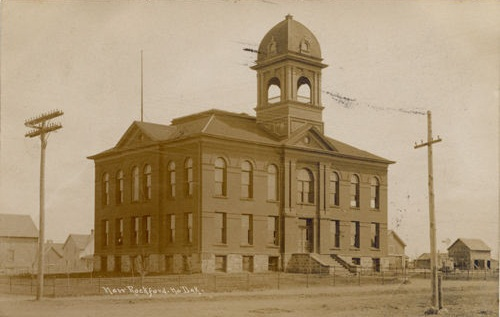
Eddy County Courthouse, c. 1908
