= Our Lady of the Annunciation Chapel at Annunciation Priory =

Historic church in North Dakota, United States

- U.S. National Register of Historic Places
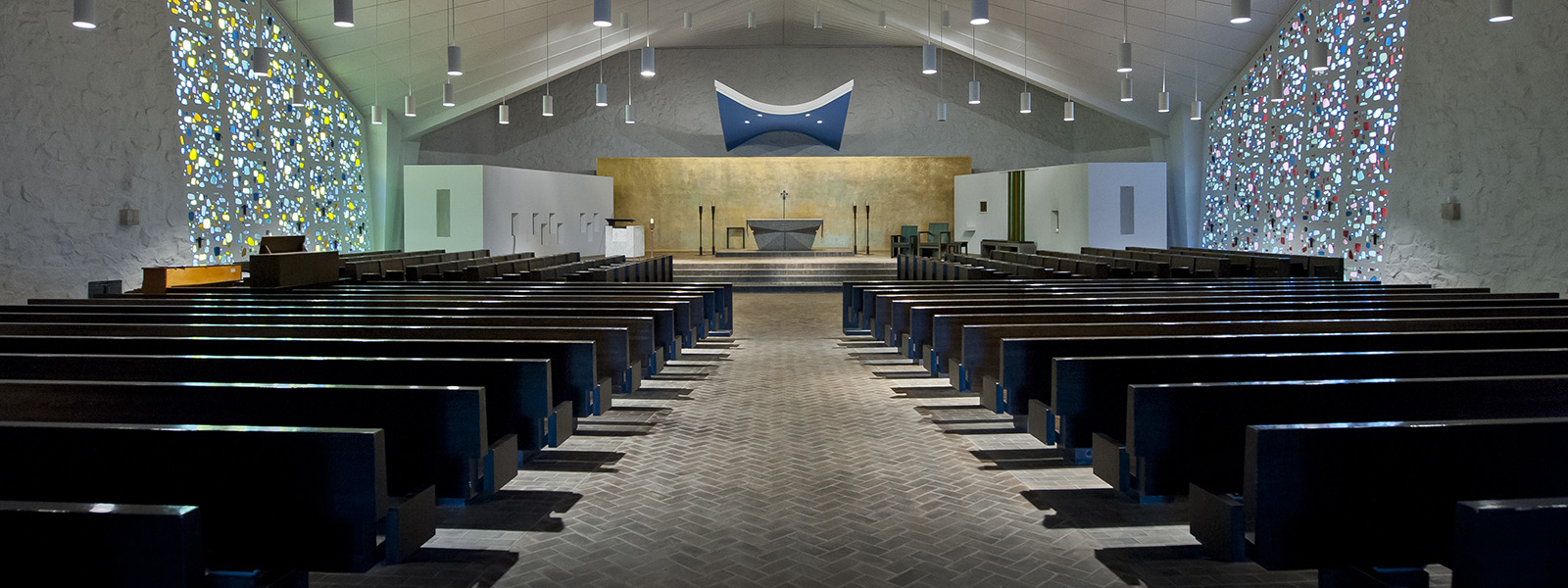

- Location within North Dakota Location within the United States
- Location: 7500 University Dr. (University of Mary), Bismarck, North Dakota
- Coordinates: 46°43′18″N 100°45′14″W
- Built: 1905
- NRHP reference No.: 100005177
- Added to NRHP: June 16, 2020

The Our Lady of the Annunciation Chapel at Annunciation Priory in Bismarck, North Dakota, was listed on the National Register of Historic Places in 2020. It is located at 7500 University Drive and is the chapel of University of Mary. The chapel was designed by modernist architect Marcel Breuer, who termed this chapel his "jewel on the prairie."

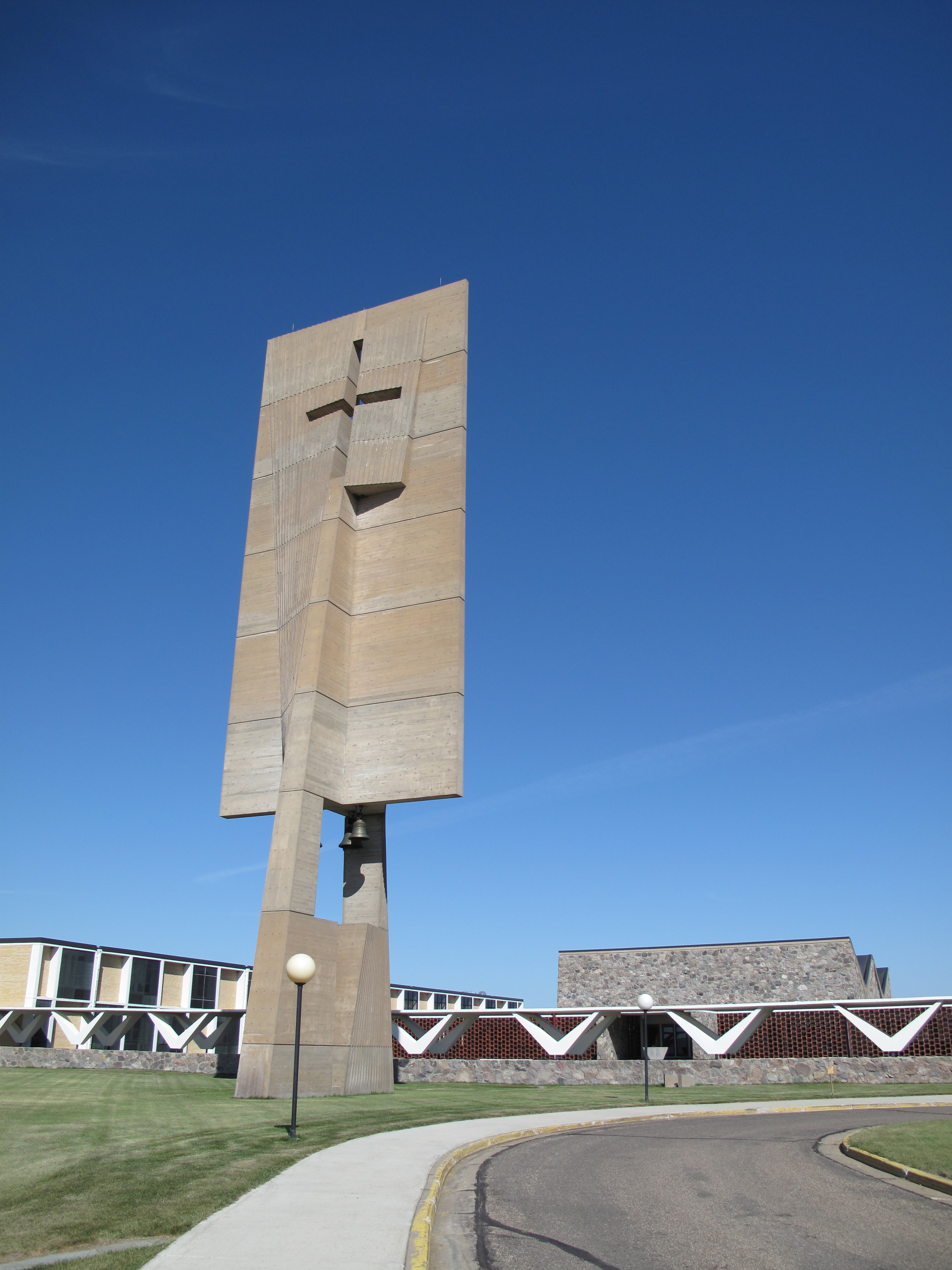
Bell tower

It was built in 1963 and is Brutalist in style. It has a pipe organ of 1,641 pipes. The chapel can seat 500 persons.

== See also ==
- Annunciation Monastery (University of Mary)
- National Register of Historic Places listings in Burleigh County, North Dakota
- List of Marcel Breuer works
