= M.E. Beebe Historic District =

Historic district in North Dakota, United States

- U.S. National Register of Historic Places
- U.S. Historic district
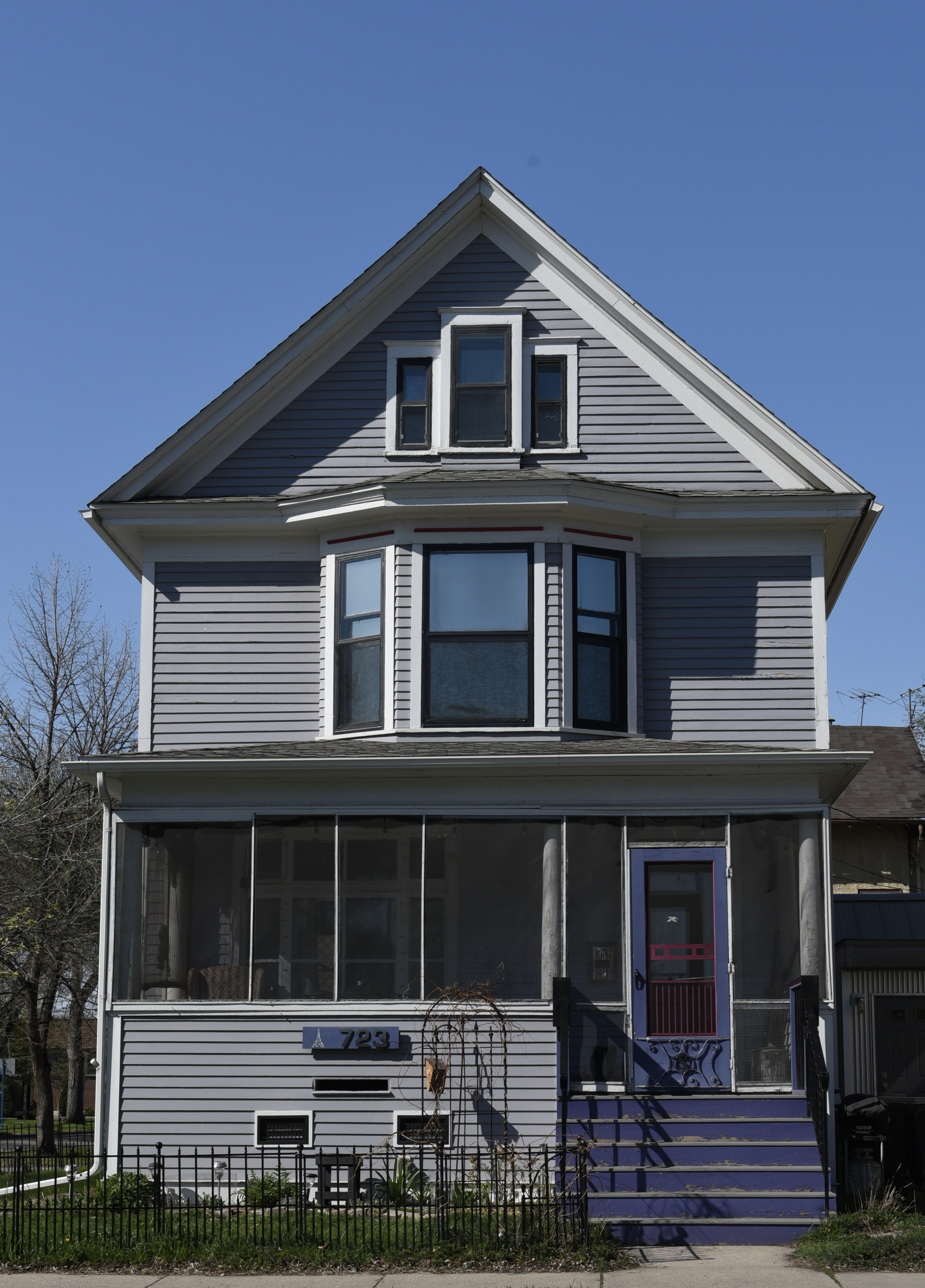

- Location within North Dakota Location within the United States
- Location: Northeastern corner of 3rd Ave., N. and N. 8th St., Fargo, North Dakota
- Coordinates: 46.879720°N 96.791667°W
- Area: .48 acres (0.19 ha)
- Architectural style: Classical Revival
- NRHP reference No.: 15000825
- Added to NRHP: November 24, 2015

The M.E. Beebe Historic District. in Fargo, North Dakota, is a .48 acres (0.19 ha) historic district which was listed on the National Register of Historic Places in 2015.

It consists of six contributing buildings on three lots. All were built between about 1881 and 1906. One was moved and reoriented on the property. Two were moved from elsewhere to this location.

It includes an office of architect Milton Earl Beebe and four buildings designed by him, including at least one of his own residences while he lived in Fargo. Beebe lived in Fargo from about 1900 to 1911.

"The proposed historic district was the site of Beebe’s office, for about six years, as well as his place of residence for nine years. As speculative rental properties, the district’s other five contributing buildings—three of which were also designed by him—constitute Beebe’s own participation in the Boom’s economic potential. The length of his residence in North Dakota coincides almost exactly with the Boom’s duration and intensity. And his architectural output during the years 1898-1912 reflect the architectural aspirations of the period and compares favorably with contemporary work by the Hancock Brothers and W. C. Albrant (Fargo), Joseph B. DeRemer (Grand Forks) and Arthur Van Horn (Bismarck), his principal competitors."
