= 1881 Buffalo mayoral election =

- November 8, 1881
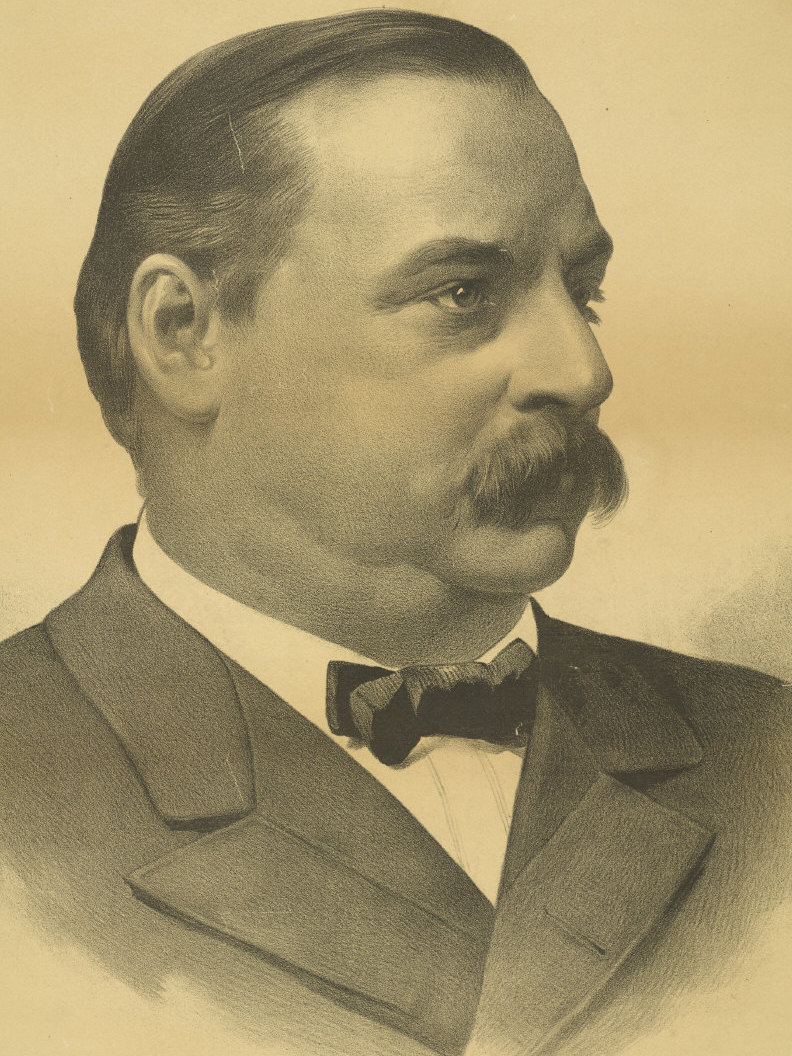

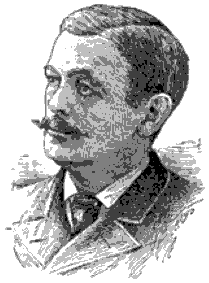
Nominee	Grover Cleveland	Milton Beebe
Party	Democratic	Republican
Popular vote	15,120	11,528
Percentage	56.74%	43.26%
Mayor before election
Alexander Brush
Republican
Elected mayor
Grover Cleveland
Democratic

The 1881 mayoral election in Buffalo, New York, saw the election of former Erie County Sheriff Grover Cleveland, who defeated architect and alderman Milton Beebe by what was considered a broad margin.

Cleveland would not serve out his entire term as mayor, as he would be subsequently elected Governor of New York the following year.

== Results ==
1881 Buffalo mayoral election
Party	Candidate	Votes	%
Democratic	Grover Cleveland	15,120	56.74%
Republican	Milton Beebe	11,528	43.26%
