= Cambria County Courthouse =

- U.S. National Register of Historic Places
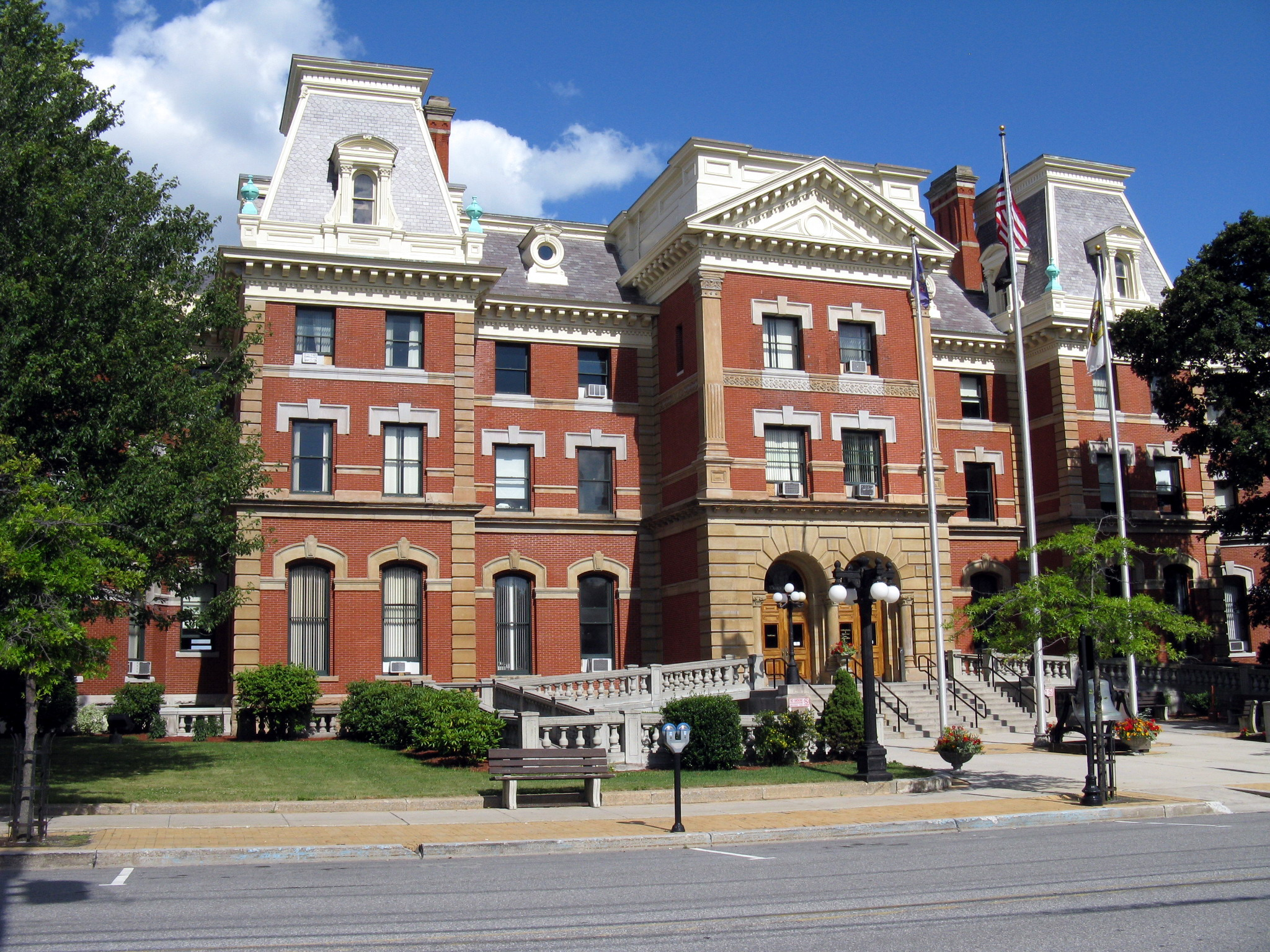
- Cambria County Courthouse, July 2009

- Location within Pennsylvania Location within the United States
- Interactive map showing the location of Cambria County Courthouse
- Location: Center St., Ebensburg, Pennsylvania
- Coordinates: 40°29′1″N 78°43′29″W
- Area: 1.6 acres (0.65 ha)
- Built: 1880-1881, 1923
- Architect: Beebe, M.E.
- Architectural style: Second Empire
- NRHP reference No.: 80003449
- Added to NRHP: June 30, 1980

Cambria County Courthouse is a historic courthouse located at Ebensburg, Cambria County, Pennsylvania, United States. It was built in 1880–1881, and is a 3 1/2-story, brick building in the Second Empire style. It features a mansard roof.

It was added to the National Register of Historic Places in 1980.

== Building ==
Two earlier courthouses served the county. The first was built in 1808 and the second in 1828–1830. The current courthouse was built on the same site as the second.

M.E. Beebe of Buffalo, New York designed the courthouse and Henry Shenk constructed it at a cost of $109,962. The building is a parallelogram with a 120 ft. of frontage on Center St. with a depth of 80 ft. The height to the eaves of the roof is 48 ft. Eighty thousand pressed bricks made by H & G Evans of Philadelphia were used to construct the outer walls, and 20,000 bricks were made onsite for the inner walls.

The mansard slate roof has porthole dormers and elaborate chimneys and a decorative bracketed cornice. The central pavilion has flanking pilasters supporting a classic portico.

A 1923 renovation added an elevator, three new wings, each with a courtroom, and a rotunda with an elaborate glass dome joining the wings. Courtroom 1 was added at this time. It is one of the largest courtrooms in the United States, with 500 seats. A second renovation was completed in 1995. Twenty-six portraits of county judges grace the building, many of which were painted in the 1920s and 1930s by Mr. and Mrs. Vale. Two 1930 murals, Knowledge and Justice were restored in 1994.

== See also ==
- List of state and county courthouses in Pennsylvania
