= Menoken Indian Village Site =

- U.S. National Register of Historic Places
- U.S. National Historic Landmark
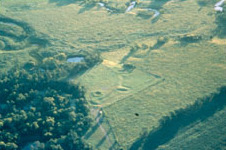
- Aerial view of the site

- Location within North Dakota Location within the United States
- Nearest city: Bismarck, North Dakota
- Coordinates: 46.8412°N 100.5182°W
- NRHP reference No.: 66000599

Significant dates
- Added to NRHP: October 15, 1966
- Designated NHL: July 19, 1964

The Menoken Indian Village Site, also known as Menoken Site, Verendrye Site or Apple Creek Site is an archeological site near Bismarck, North Dakota. The site, that of a fortified village occupied c. 1300, is important in the region's prehistory, as it is one of the only sites that predates sites that are more clearly associated with the historic Hidatsa, Mandan, and Arikara cultures. It was declared a National Historic Landmark in 1964, and was listed on the National Register of Historic Places in 1966. It is located on 171st Street NE, north of Menoken, about 10 miles (16 km) east of Bismarck. The site is managed by the state as the Menoken Indian Village State Historic Site and is open to the public.

Also listed on the National Register, in 2010, is a set of Depression Era Work Relief Construction Features at Menoken State Historic Site.

== Description ==
The Menoken Site occupies a terrace on the south side of Apple Creek, a tributary of the Missouri River, to which it flows near Bismarck. The site consists of a defensive earthworks, whose major component is a ditch about 245 metres (804 ft) in length, with four bastion loops projecting outward at equally spaced intervals. The ditch is about 1.5 metres (4.9 ft) deep and varies in width from 6 to 7 metres (20 to 23 ft) in width. The ditch forms a curve, covering about 100° of a circle, and protects an inner area of about 1.5 acres (0.61 ha). Archaeological evidence indicates that there was originally a palisade just inside the ditch, but only post holes of this structure survive. The inner area of the fortification has not been fully investigated but is estimated to have had between 11 and 13 semi-subterranean residential structures in it.

This site, first excavated in the 1930s, was thought for many years to be that of a Mandan village visited by the French explorer La Verendrye, but archaeological investigations in the 1990s and early 2000s have revealed evidence that the site is somewhat older and was probably occupied by ancestors of one of the region's major tribal groups, with an occupation period c. 1100-1300. It was probably used as a semi-permanent settlement, from which the occupants would hunt bison and other wildlife. Extensive finds exist here of stone tools, predominantly quarried in the Lynch Quarry vicinity to the west, as well as ceramic pottery fragments and bone tools.

The site was designated a National Historic Landmark in 1964, primarily on the basis of the belief (now known to be incorrect) that it was associated with La Verendrye, but it retains significance to its critical place in the region's prehistoric chronology and its archaeological importance. Elements of the site's improvements made during the Great Depression were listed on the National Register of Historic Places in 2010. The site was acquired by the state in 1937 and is open to the public, with a walking trail that has interpretive signage.

== Depression Era Work Relief Construction Features ==
- Depression Era Work Relief Construction Features at Menoken State Historic Site
- U.S. National Register of Historic Places
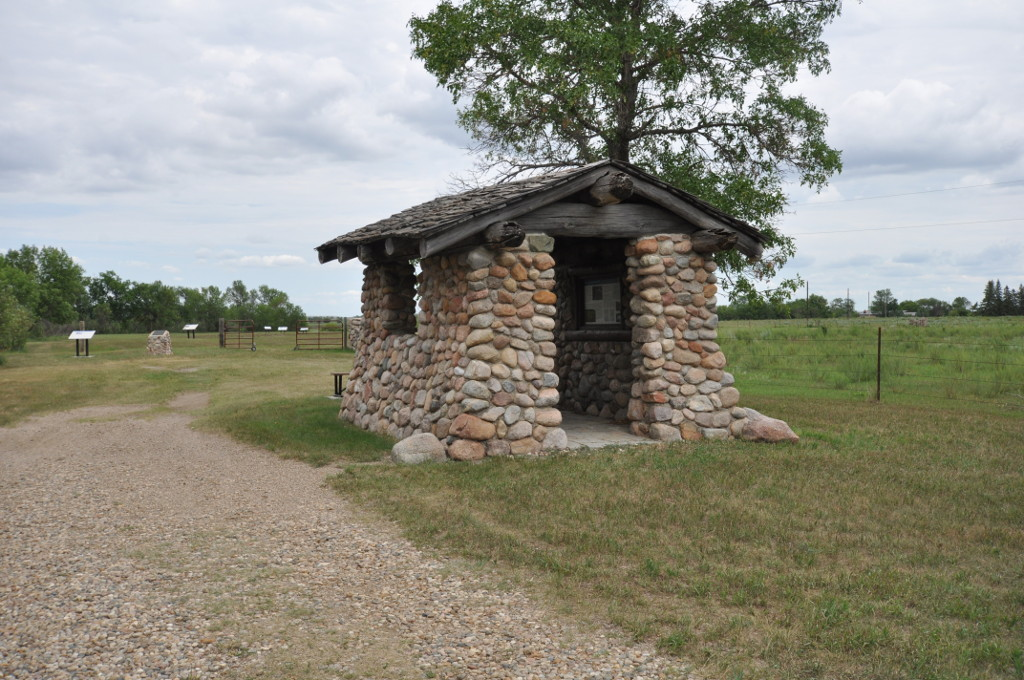
- CCC kiosk, in 2017
- Location: 171st St and 32nd Ave NE, Burleigh County, North Dakota (1.7 mi N of Menoken, near Bismarck)
- Coordinates: 46.8412°N 100.5182°W
- Area: 1.9 acres (0.77 ha)
- Built: c. 1931-1943
- Built by: Works Progress Administration
- Architect: Russell Reid
- MPS: Federal Relief Construction in North Dakota, 1931-1943, MPS
- NRHP reference No.: 10000998
- Added to NRHP: December 7, 2010

Depression Era Work Relief Construction Features at Menoken State Historic Site was listed on the National Register in 2010. The listing included one contributing building and two contributing objects on a 1.9 acres (0.77 ha) portion of a 13.7 acres (5.5 ha) parcel.

== See also ==
- Double Ditch State Historic Site, similar village site, also NRHP-listed
- Depression Era Work Relief Construction Features at Double Ditch Indian Village Site State Historic Site, also NRHP-listed
- List of National Historic Landmarks in North Dakota
- National Register of Historic Places listings in Burleigh County, North Dakota
