= Milton Earl Beebe =

American architect (1840–1923)

Milton Earle Beebe
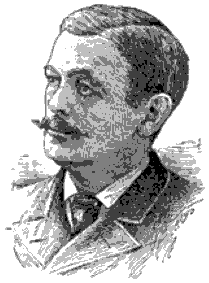
- Born: November 27, 1840; Cassadaga, New York, US
- Died: February 3, 1923 (aged 82); San Diego, California, US
- Occupation: Architect
- Spouse(s): Rosina I. (Phillips) Beebe; Rose J. (Curran) Beebe
- Buildings: Eddy County Courthouse, Main Building, Concordia College, Hubbard County Courthouse

Milton Earle Beebe (November 27, 1840 – February 3, 1923) was an American architect who designed numerous buildings in Buffalo, New York, in Fargo, North Dakota, and elsewhere. He designed courthouses "at Warren, Smethport, Cambria, and Huntingdon in Pennsylvania, costing $100,000 each." Several are listed on the National Register of Historic Places. He also designed Early Commercial architecture buildings, residences, churches and public buildings.

== Biography ==
Beebe was born November 27, 1840, in Cassadaga, New York. Beebe was the third son of Justus Beebe and Harriet (Quigley) Beebe. He was a Private in the Union Army on September 11, 1861, in Stockton, New York, and was assigned to Company K, 9th New York Cavalry on October 2, 1861. He was promoted to Bugler on October 24, 1861, and received a Disability Discharge on June 20, 1862.

After the war he took up the study of architecture and worked for Wilcox and Porter (especially under C.K. Porter) did carpentry work, and went to Chicago where he studied under Gurdon P. Randall for two years. He established his own practice in Buffalo in 1873. Beebe designed several courthouses.

He was "zealous" Republican and was elected Alderman in the Second Ward. He ran for mayor in 1881 but lost to Grover Cleveland. Beebe married Rosina Ida Phillips on November 5, 1862, in Cassadaga, New York. He was later remarried to Rose Josephine (Curran) Beebe. He died February 3, 1923, in San Diego. Beebe was an active member of the Masonic fraternity and a leader of the A.O.U.W. including as Grand Master Workman for the state of New York in 1880.

Beebe's residence was at 4481 Porter Avenue.

Beebe left Buffalo to begin a career in North Dakota, locating first in Bismarck, ND. He relocated to Fargo, ND and practiced there from 1899 to 1911. The M.E. Beebe Historic District includes his workshop, where he designed more than eighty buildings in both North Dakota and Minnesota before retiring to San Diego, CA. The district was listed on the National Register of Historic Places in 2015.

== Works ==
- Cambria County Courthouse, built 1880 with Second Empire architecture, Center St. Ebensburg, PA (Beebe, M.E. and Shank, Henry), NRHP-listed
- Eddy County Courthouse, 524 Central Ave. New Rockford, ND (Beebe, M.E.), NRHP-listed
- Hubbard County Courthouse, 3rd and Court Sts. Park Rapids, MN (Beebe, M.E.), NRHP-listed
- Main Building, Concordia College, S. 8th St. Moorhead, MN (Beebe, Milton M.), NRHP-listed
- E. G. Patterson Building, 412-414 Main St. Bismarck, ND (Beebe, Milton Earl), NRHP-listed*Soo Hotel, 112-114 5th St., N. Bismarck, ND (Beebe, Milton Earl), NRHP-listed
- Warren County Courthouse, Market St. and 4th Ave. Warren, PA (Beebe, M.E.), NRHP-listed
- McKean County Courthouse (1880), Smethport, the third county courthouse built. After a fire in 1940, appears to have been replaced with a neoclassical building.
- Pottsville Courthouse (1892)
- Greene block, corner Washington and North Division Streets
- Nellany block, corner of Main and Mohawk Streets
- Post Office block on Seneca Street opposite the Custom House
- Austin Exchange building on Main Street below Seneca Street
- Police Stations 3 and 7
- Fire Department Headquarters
- Mrs. M.A. Ransom residence
- Mrs. E. Swope residence on Main Street
- Henry Erb residence on Main Street
- Geo. H. Van Vleck residence on Delaware Avenue
- James H. Lee residence on Delaware Avenue
- Nelson Holland residence on Delaware Avenue
- C.S. Clarke residence on North Street
- George Goetz residence on Niagara street
- Knapp residence on Franklin Street
- George W. Tew residence in Jamestown
- N. Babcock residence in Silver Creek
- S. Howes residence in Silver Creek
- Presbyterian church in Jamestown
- Episcopal church in St. Catharines, Ontario
- Methodist Episcopal church in Tonawanda
- Episcopal church in Lancaster
- Methodist Episcopal church in Aurora
- Congregational church in Arcade
- German Evangelical church in Buffalo
- German Methodist Episcopal church in Buffalo
- Mooney & Brisbane Building (1895)
- Seymour H. Knox house at 414 Porter Avenue in Buffalo
- Masten Park High School (1897), built with Italian ceramic terra cotta block, poured concrete roof, decorated with red Spanish tile on the outside and slate shingles on the backside. Destroyed by a 1912 fire. Sprinklers were in the basement where the dynamo was located.
- Moorhead, Minnesota, public library (1906) was funded by Andrew Carnegie. It was demolished in 1963.
- J. F. Haven Iron Building on Main Street and Seneca Street.
- Lewis J. Bennett house in Central Park, Buffalo built for Lewis J. Bennett (1833 - 1925) owner of Buffalo Cement Company and developer of the Central Park area of Buffalo.
- Tucker Building
- Zink & Hatch Building at Niagara Street and Eagle Street
- J. C. Jewett Building at 327 Washington Street

== Gallery ==
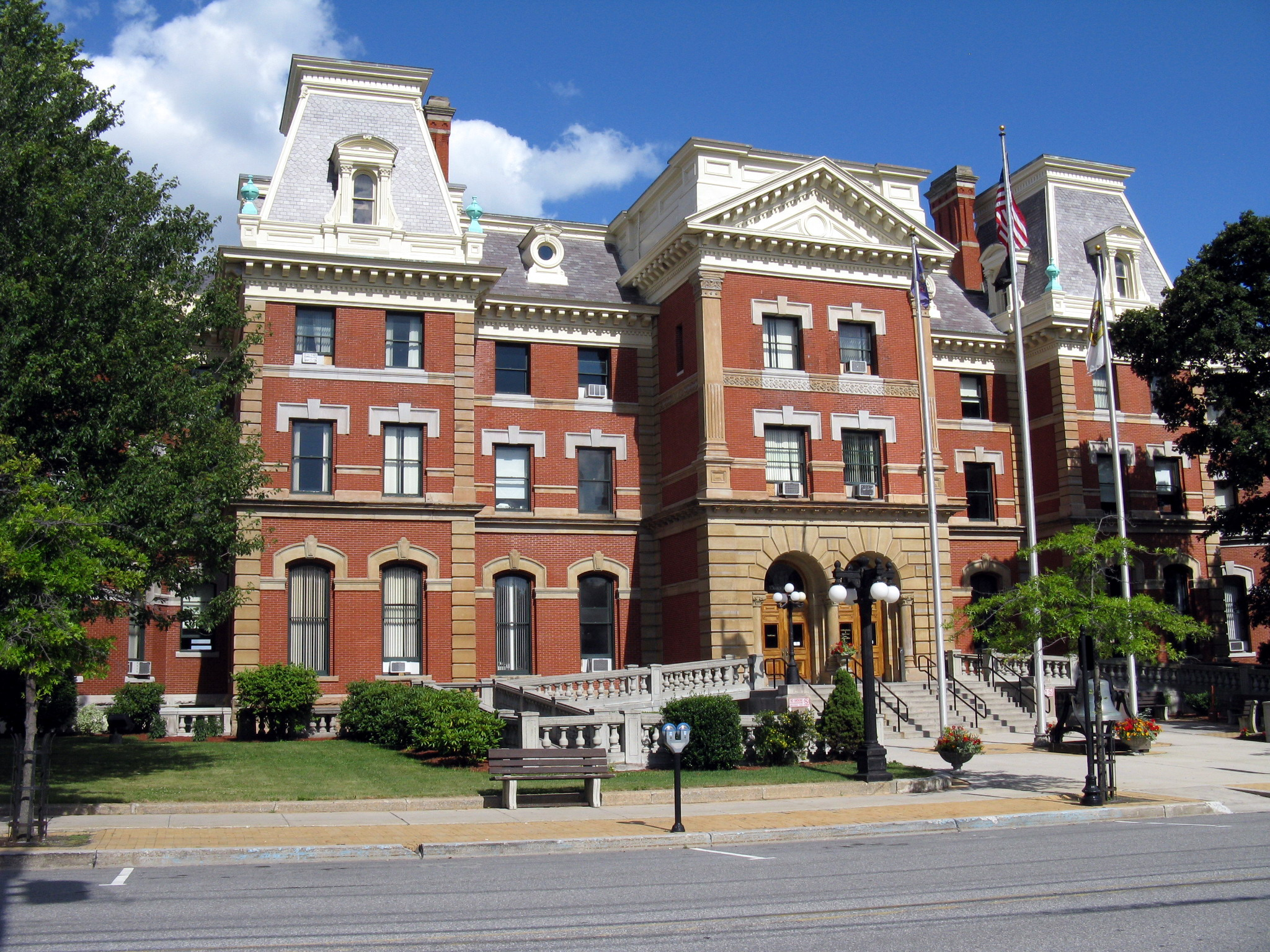
Cambria County Courthouse

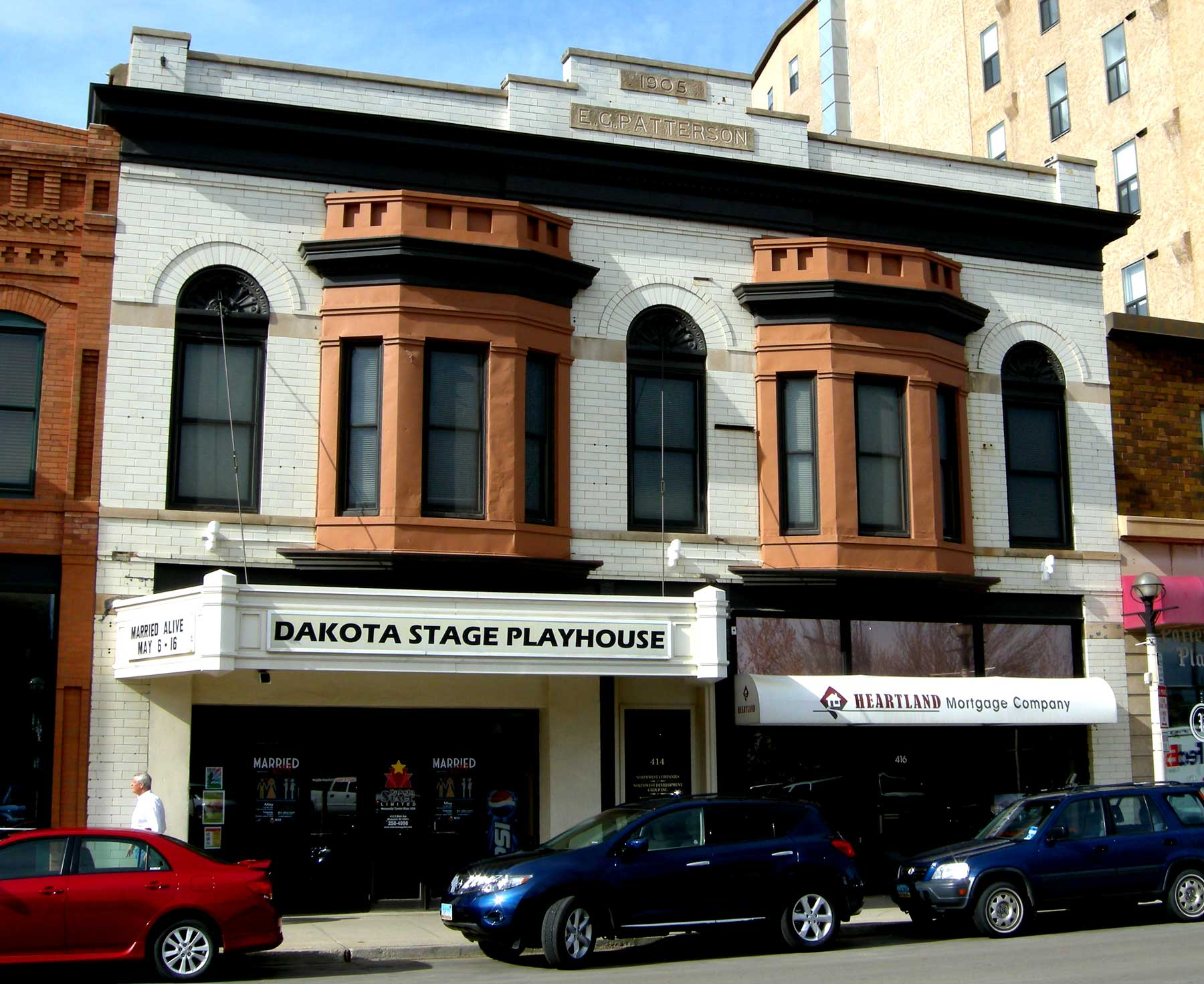
E.G. Patterson Building

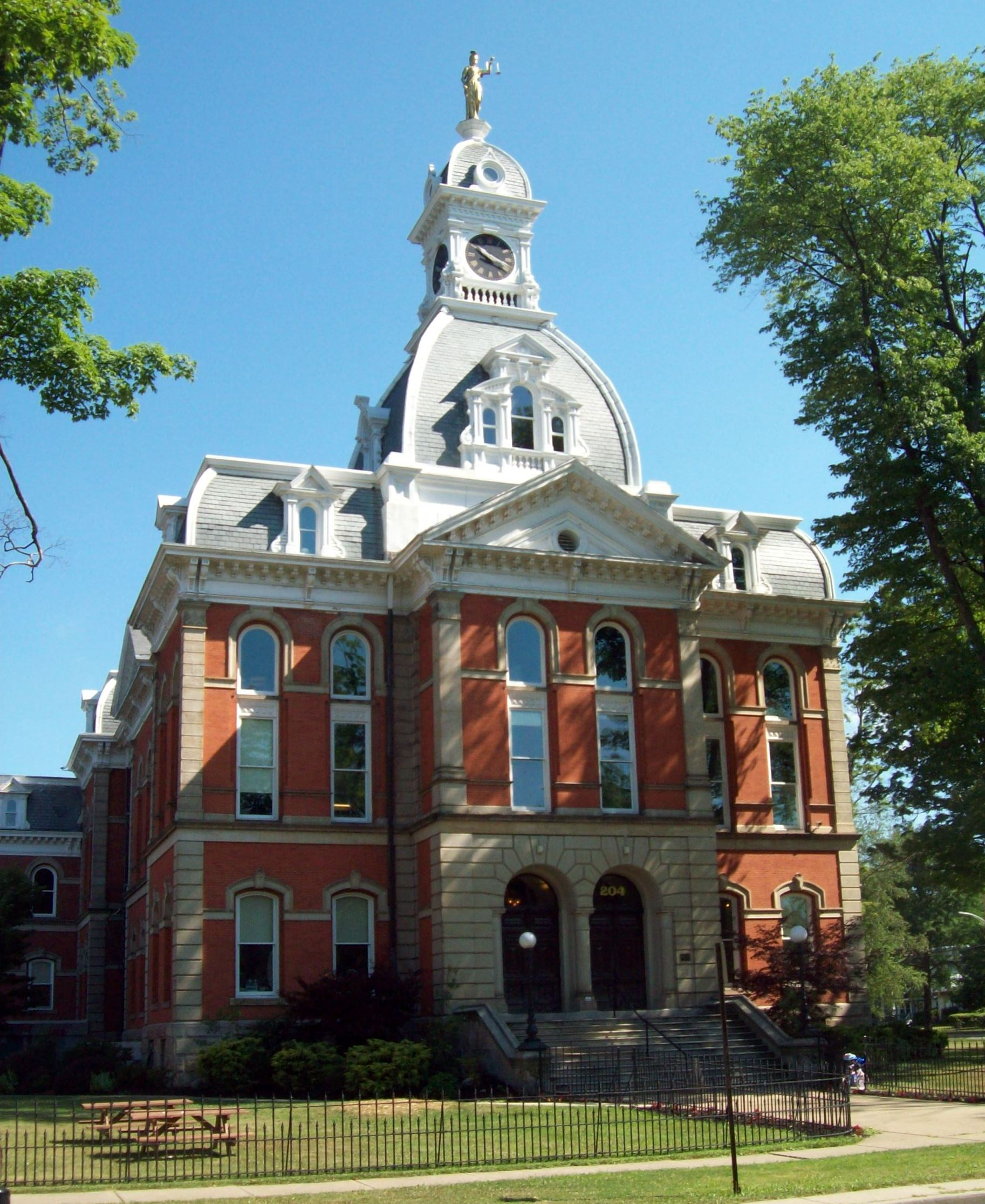
Warren County Courthouse (Pennsylvania)

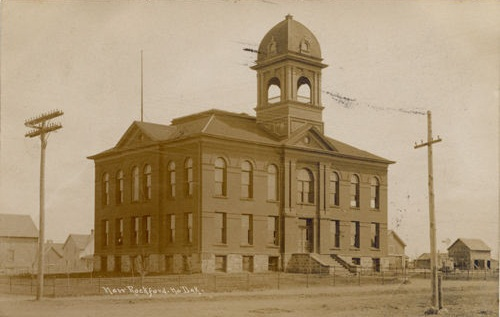
Eddy County Courthouse
