= Annunciation Monastery (University of Mary) =

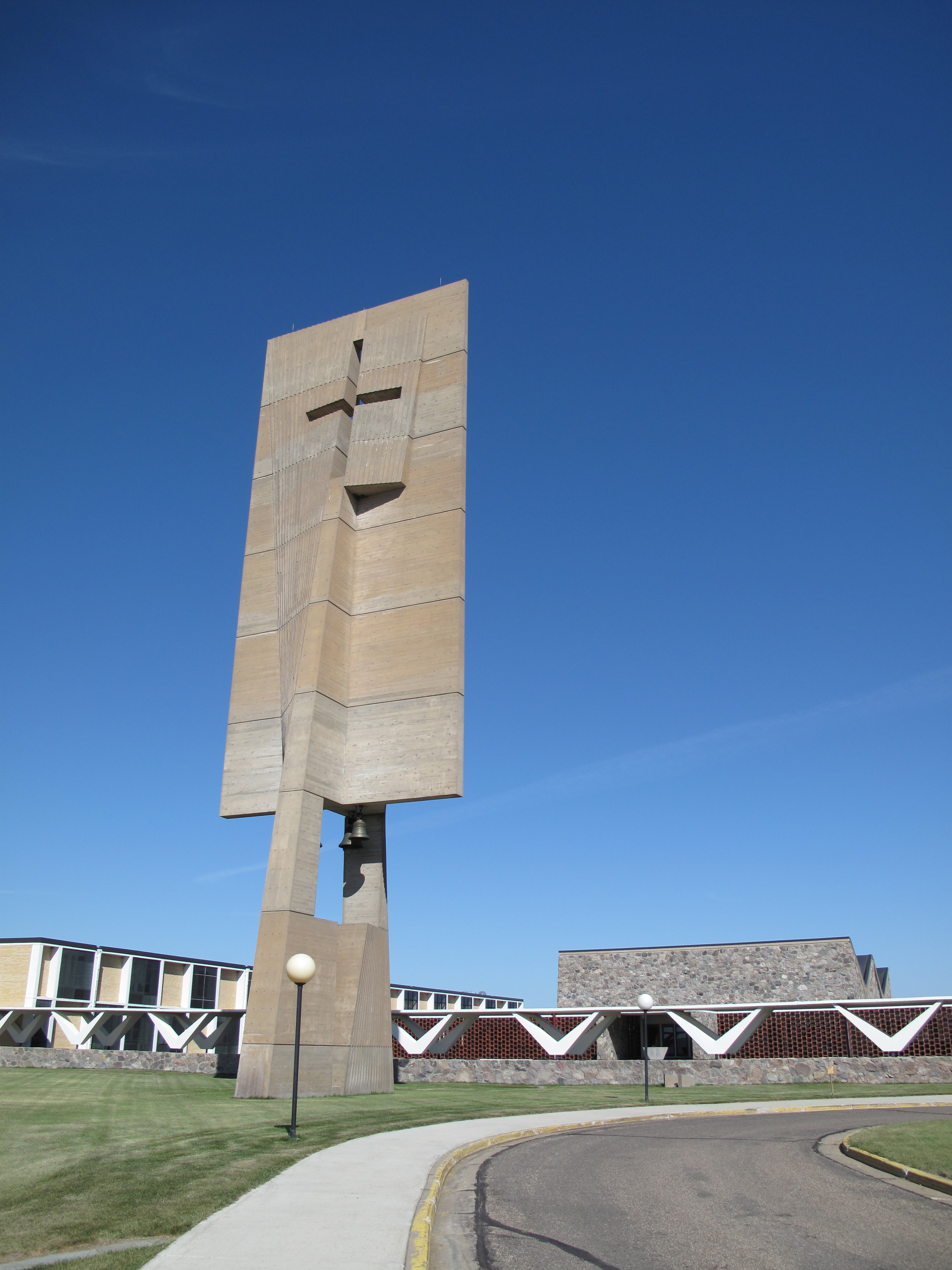
- Interactive map of the Annunciation Monastery area

General information
- Coordinates: 46.71980°N 100.75264°W

Design and construction
- Architect: Marcel Breuer

Annunciation Monastery is a Benedictine monastery in Bismarck, North Dakota, US, associated with the University of Mary. The monastery's building was designed by noted modernist architect Marcel Breuer and constructed from 1959 to 1963. The project features a 100 feet (30 m) tall bell banner which is similar to the one constructed by Breuer at Saint John's Abbey, Collegeville.

== Gallery ==
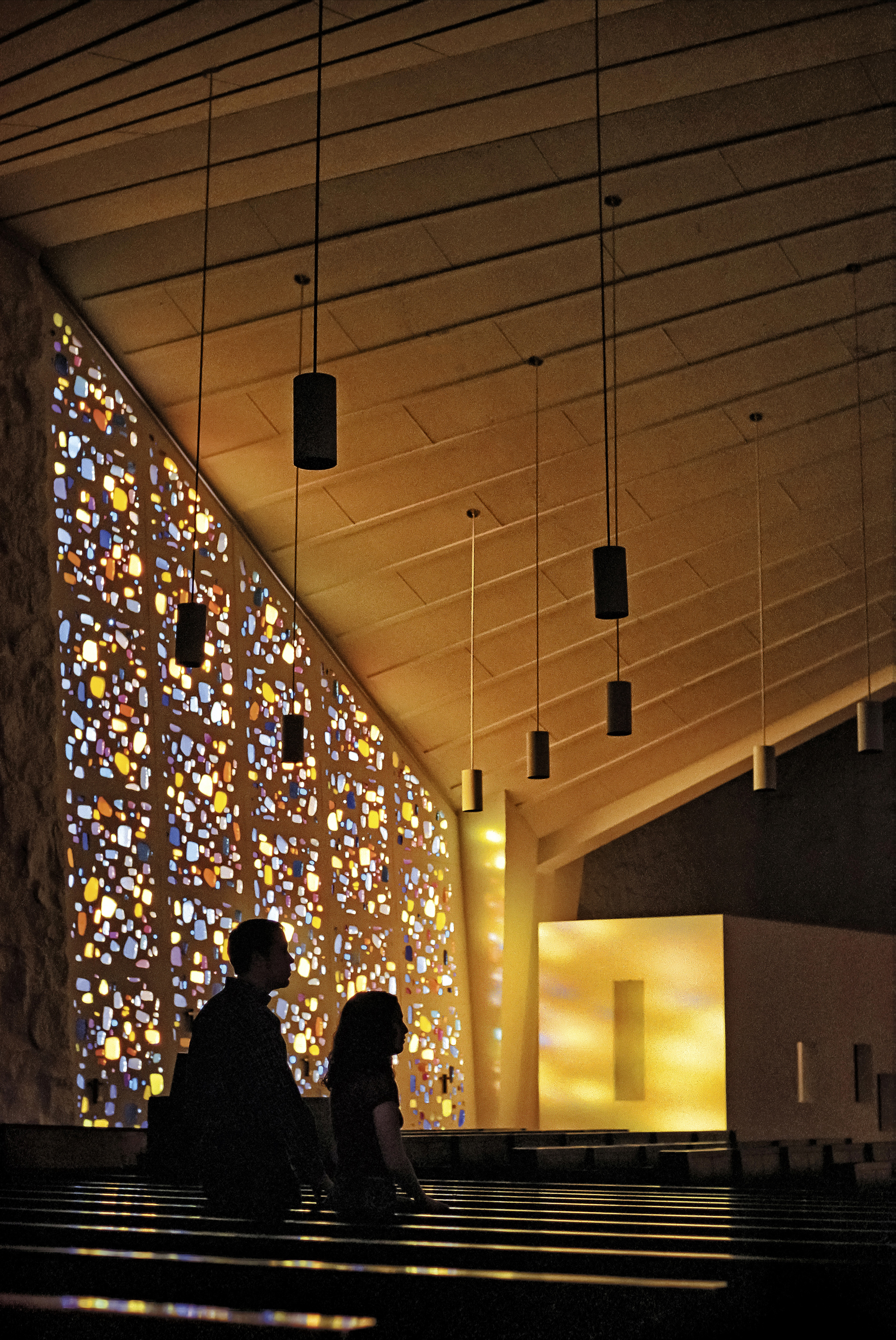
Building interior

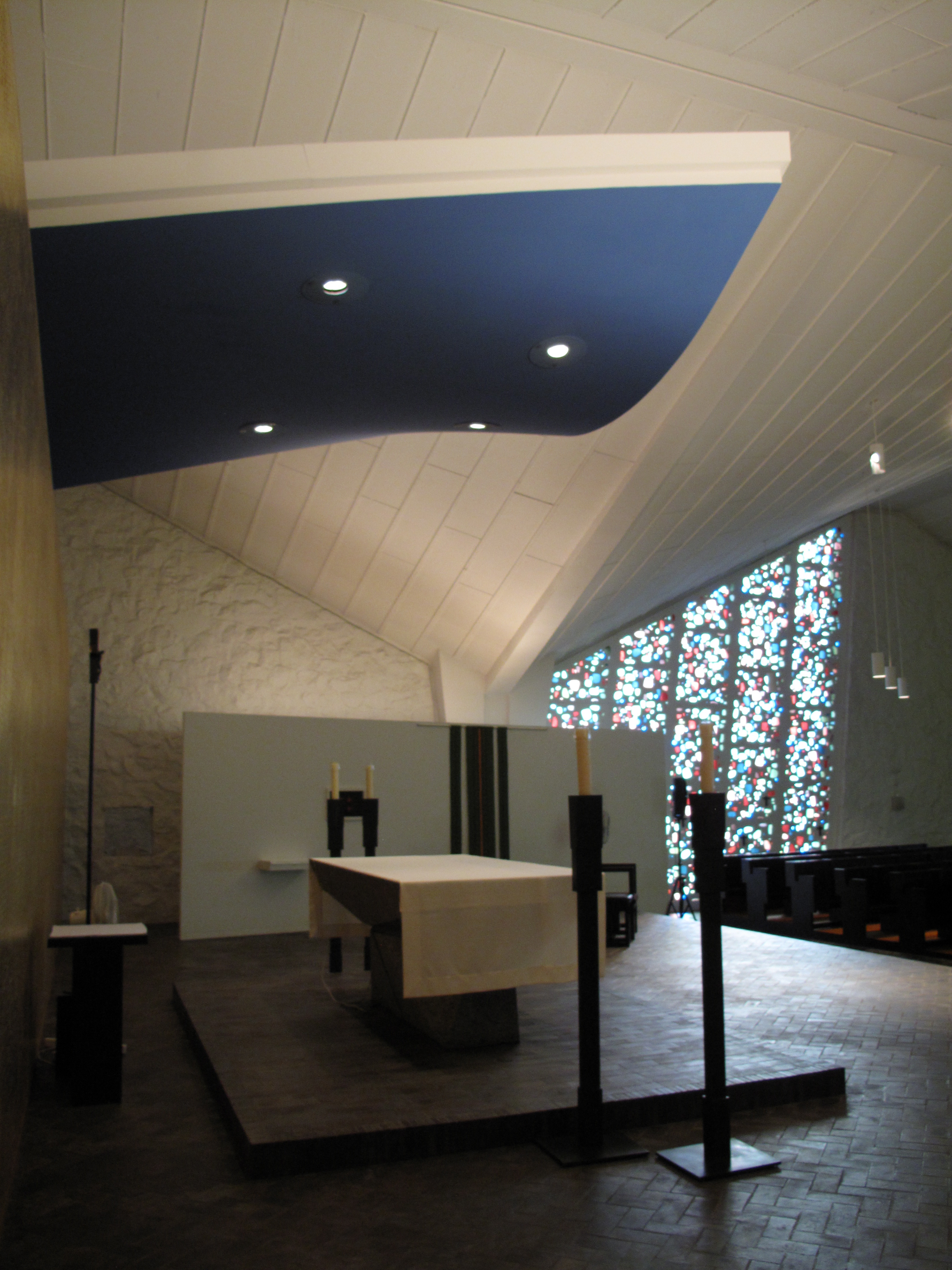
Altar

== See also ==
- Our Lady of the Annunciation Chapel at Annunciation Priory
