= Towne–Williams House =

Historic house in North Dakota, United States

- U.S. National Register of Historic Places
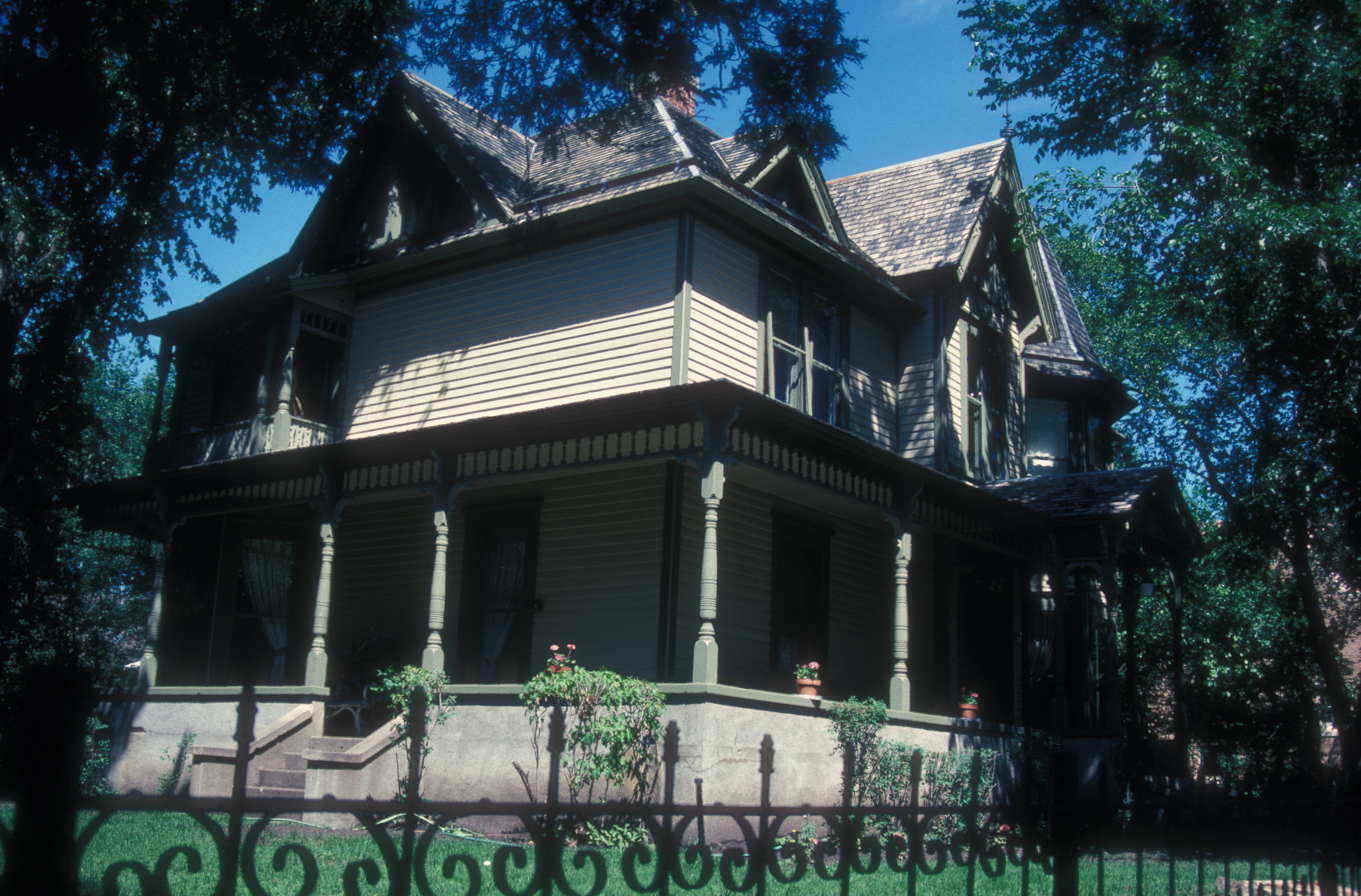

- Location within North Dakota Location within the United States
- Location: 722 7th St., N., Bismarck, North Dakota
- Coordinates: 46°48′45″N 100°46′53″W
- Area: 0.3 acres (0.12 ha)
- Built: 1885
- Architectural style: Late Victorian
- NRHP reference No.: 75001302
- Added to NRHP: April 14, 1975

The Towne–Williams House on 7th St., N., in Bismarck, North Dakota was built in 1885. It has also been known as the George W. Wallace House and as the Erastus A. Williams House. It was listed on the National Register of Historic Places (NRHP) in 1975.

Its NRHP nomination argued that it "is the most unaltered survivor of a handful of large, mansion-size residences built on the near north side of Bismarck soon after the city became the capital of Dakota Territory in 1882."
