= Foley House =

House in Westport, Ontario, Canada

Coordinates: 44.67769°N 76.39456°W

Foley House, located at 45 and 47 Main Street, Westport, Ontario, Canada is of significant historical note because of its connection to Canada's first Prime Minister, Sir John A. Macdonald. Perhaps because of the Foley family acquaintance with several Fathers of Confederation, the Foley family played a prominent commercial role from this home and mercantile situated at the high water point of the Rideau Canal.

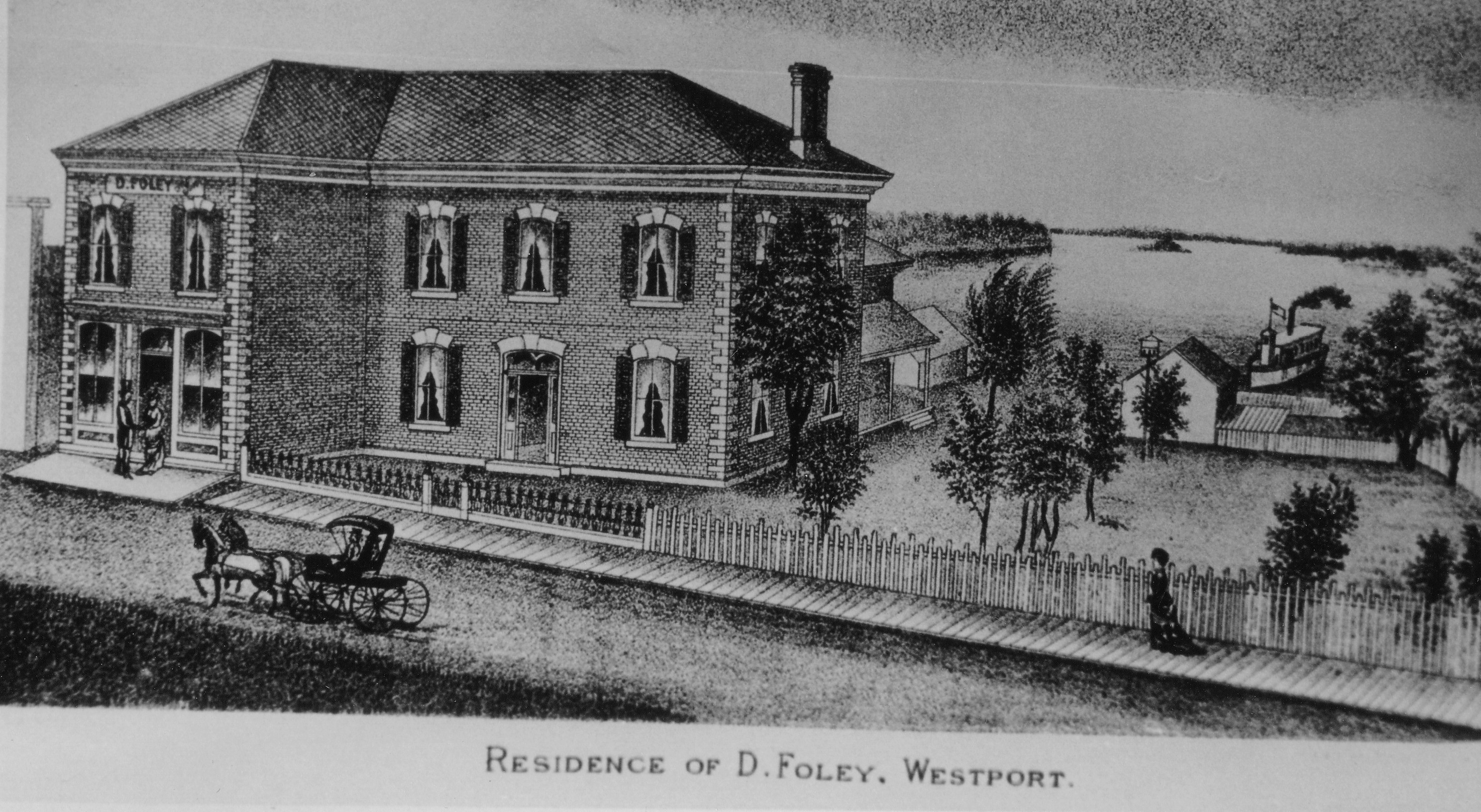
Foley House and Mercantile as depicted in the 1800s with the Rideau King arriving at the Foley dock

The Foley House is a grand Victorian era house built in 1867, the year of Canadian Confederation, for Declan Finbar Foley and his wife Mary Ann Buckly. Six generations of Declan Foley's descendants enjoyed the well-built home, made three bricks thick and of the best available materials.

== Foley Family ==
Declan Finbar Foley was born 1819 in Youghal, County Cork, Ireland, one of five children. After his father's death in 1836, Declan and his sister Bridget emigrated to live with their uncle Rev. Patrick Foley in Ogdensburg, New York. Traveling to Kingston, Ontario, where brother John, had entered the Regeopolis College, Declan spent a few years employed by the Honorable John Hamilton . Declan's move to Prescott, Ontario and his marriage to Mary Ann Buckly of the township of Beckwith, near Almonte in 1846 was the beginning of a new branch of the Foley family. In 1851, after spending five years with his brother Michael, who owned a general store in Chicago, Declan was drawn to Westport by his brother John, who was a circuit Priest. It was the beginning of the era of the Foley's of Westport. The Westport, Ontario waterfront had become a thriving commercial center, with the steam ships Rideau King and Rideau Queen ferrying people and supplies between Ottawa and Kingston a safe distance away from the St. Lawrence River and the perceived fear of American attack. Declan established a mercantile and forwarding business with docking at the base of his property.

The Rideau King entering the Westport channel in 1912

The general store opened by Declan Foley, and continued by his son John, operated from 1867 until 1945. The store supplied the Westport community with such diverse items as farm equipment, building supplies, mortgages, fabrics, eyeglasses and medicinal products.

Although Declan and Mary Ann had many children - sixteen within twenty-two years - four children died in their youth. All of the children were highly educated. And several Foley descendants played prominent roles in Canadian government and in religion. The youngest daughter of Declan, Mary - known as "Birdie"- loved nature and was a talented painter. Of course, no young lady of that time would be encouraged to sell her art; such talent was considered a private gift. As a result, many of Birdie's paintings, in handsome frames, hung in the Foley drawing room for over 100 years.

In 2001, the disheartening task of dispersing home and contents rested on the shoulders of Mrs. Ursula Gilhooly, great-granddaughter of Declan Finbar Foley, bringing to a close the era of an early settler and prominent founding family of Westport. The well-built home, resting on a Canadian Shield granite base remains today in much the same condition as when it was built.

== Prominent Visitors to the Foley House ==
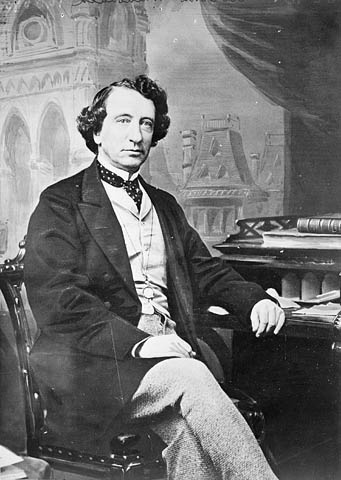
Sir John Alexander Macdonald

Sir John Alexander Macdonald

The Foley House has been used for many political and charity events through the years. In 1992, the 125th anniversary of Canada's confederation was celebrated with a special toast to Sir John A. Macdonald. He is reported by Foley descendants to have stayed with his friend Declan Foley during his many trips between Ottawa and Kingston. It was Sir John's friendship with Declan Foley that led to several items of Macdonald family furniture becoming fixtures in the Foley House, up until the sale out of the Foley family.

Thomas D'Arcy McGee was one of the fathers of Canadian confederation. In 1866, within feet of the site of the Foley House, he is reported to have given an impassioned soap box speech in favour of confederation. Just two years later he was shot dead on the steps of his home in Ottawa.

== The Foley House Today ==
In 1997, the great, great-granddaughter of Declan Foley converted the mercantile into The Foley Arms (then later, Remy's Westport), a restaurant and pub at which patrons were served while seated at the original 1867 sales counter. The Foley House looks much the same today as it did when it was constructed, and was maintained and improved under the guidance of the curator of Sir John A. Macdonald homestead Bellevue House, a resident of Westport. The home was sold out of the Foley family in 2002, then again in 2008. After being converted back into single-family estate, Foley House was sold once more in 2020.
