= Patterson Hotel =

- U.S. National Register of Historic Places
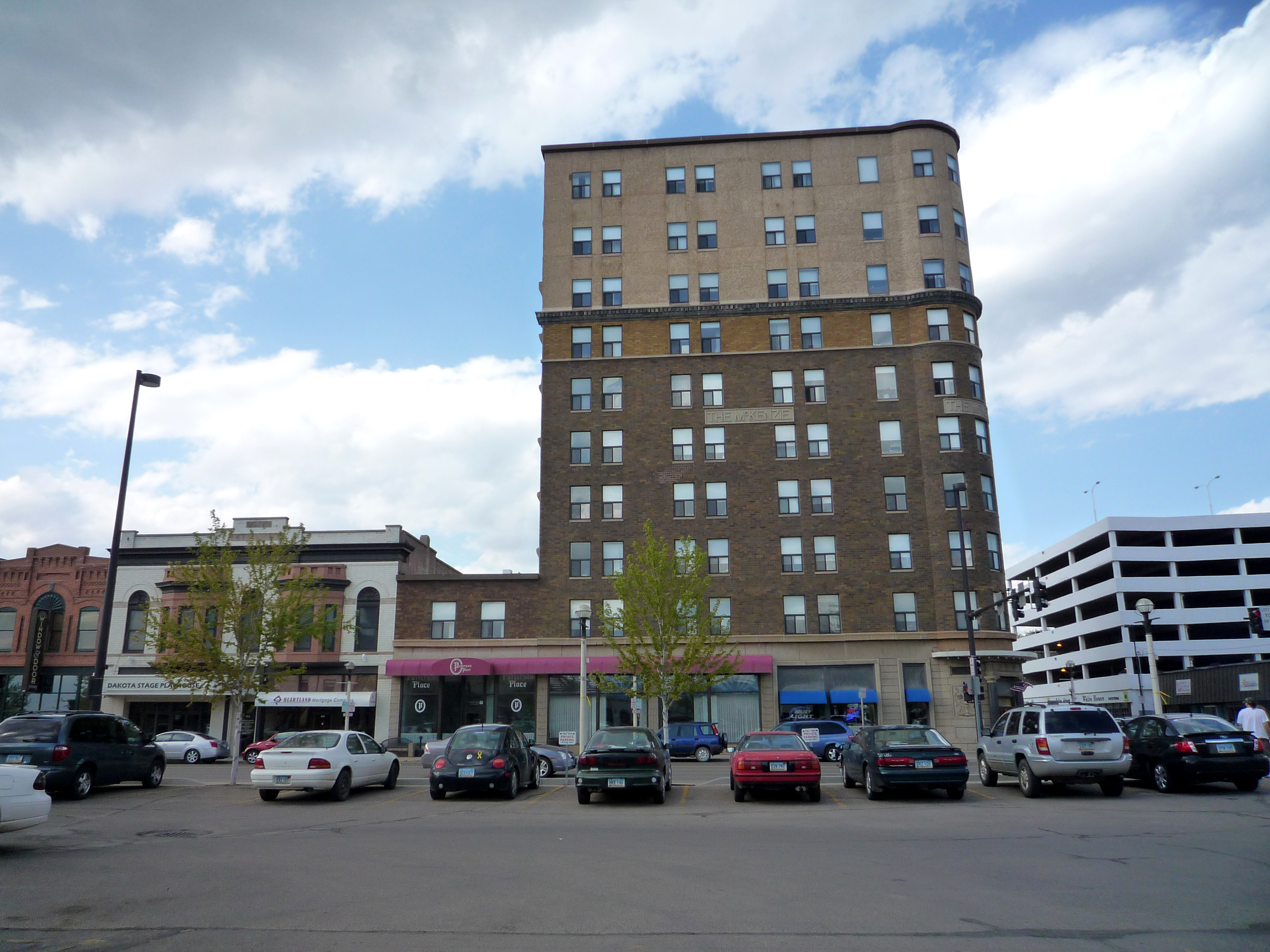

- Location within North Dakota Location within the United States
- Location: 422 E. Main Ave., Bismarck, North Dakota
- Coordinates: 46.805442°N 100.785280°W
- Built: 1910
- Architect: H. Kretz & Company
- NRHP reference No.: 76001352
- Added to NRHP: December 8, 1976

The Patterson Hotel was a prominent and luxurious hotel located in Bismarck, North Dakota, United States, that was home to the Nonpartisan League and well known for its continued construction that lasted over twenty years. The hotel was a major hotspot for politicians throughout the 1960s.

First named the McKenzie Hotel, the structure was constructed by Alexander McKenzie and opened on New Year's Day, 1911. At the time it opened, the ten-story, 150-room hotel was the tallest structure in Bismarck, and would retain this distinction until the new North Dakota State Capitol was completed in 1934. Edward Patterson, a close friend of McKenzie, would later purchase the hotel. Patterson had constructed the adjacent Soo Hotel, also listed on the National Register, in 1906. The hotel was renamed the Patterson Hotel in 1927, shortly after the death of Alexander McKenzie.

== Continued construction ==
One of the hotel's most well-known facts is that construction continued on the structure long after it opened. Construction was finally completed in the 1930s, more than twenty years after it first began. State law at the time stated that until construction was completed, the property was exempt from property taxes, and because of this loophole, Edward Patterson continued the construction to avoid paying taxes. In the end, the hotel had grown from its original six stories to ten stories.

== Political hotspot ==
Alexander McKenzie was an influential person in local politics, and is often credited with moving the capital of Dakota Territory to Bismarck. Edward Patterson was also involved in politics, having served two terms as mayor. The Patterson Hotel became the headquarters for the Nonpartisan League when it was founded in 1915. This, in addition to McKenzie and Patterson's political connections, would make the hotel the unofficial political headquarters of North Dakota for decades. After the North Dakota capitol burned in 1930, the entire second floor of the Patterson was leased to house several state agencies until the new capitol was completed.

== Prominent visitors ==
In addition to his business ventures, Edward Patterson was also an amateur boxer. Because of this, the hotel was visited by such boxing legends as Gene Tunney, Jack Dempsey, and Joe Louis. Several presidents had also paid a visit to the Patterson Hotel, including Theodore Roosevelt, Calvin Coolidge, John F. Kennedy, and Lyndon Johnson.

At times it also housed local businessmen, including Eugene Wachter, part of the Wachter family of Bismarck and manager of the state's largest deeded ranch.

== Illegal activities ==
The Patterson Hotel secretly served alcohol during prohibition, and even set up an elaborate alarm system to keep out "unwanted guests". The hotel also once hosted illegal gambling, and was rumored to house prostitutes. It is also rumored that a tunnel once connected the hotel with the nearby train depot.

== The Patterson today ==
Until the completion of Interstate 94 in 1965, all major eastbound traffic was served by U.S. Highway 10, which ran straight through downtown Bismarck. However, with the opening of the interstate, all traffic was shifted to the north, and it directly affected all types of business in downtown Bismarck, including hotels. The Patterson ceased hotel operations sometime in the 1970s, and the rooms were converted into senior housing. The main lobby now houses the Peacock Alley American Grill and Bar.

== See also ==
- Soo Hotel, also associated with Patterson, and NRHP-listed
