= John Foley House =

Historic house in Iowa, United States

- U.S. National Register of Historic Places
- Location within Iowa Location within the United States
- Location: 511 N. Locust St. New Hampton, Iowa
- Coordinates: 43°03′52″N 92°18′49″W
- Area: 1 acre (0.40 ha)
- Built: 1875
- Architectural style: Italianate
- NRHP reference No.: 79000889
- Added to NRHP: April 16, 1979

The John Foley House is a historic residence located in New Hampton, Iowa, United States. John Foley (1841-1919) was a native of Ireland who came to Iowa in 1851 after having spent five years in Baltimore. He was engaged in farming until 1872 when he moved to New Hampton and became involved in politics, commerce, and banking. In addition to local offices, Foley spent a term in the Iowa House of Representatives and another in the Iowa Senate. He had this Italianate house built in 1875. The two-story brick house is built on a rock-faced foundation. It is basically rectangular in plan, and has an unusually deep 2-story polygonal projecting bay on the south side. The house was listed on the National Register of Historic Places in 1979.
