= E. G. Patterson Building =

- U.S. National Register of Historic Places
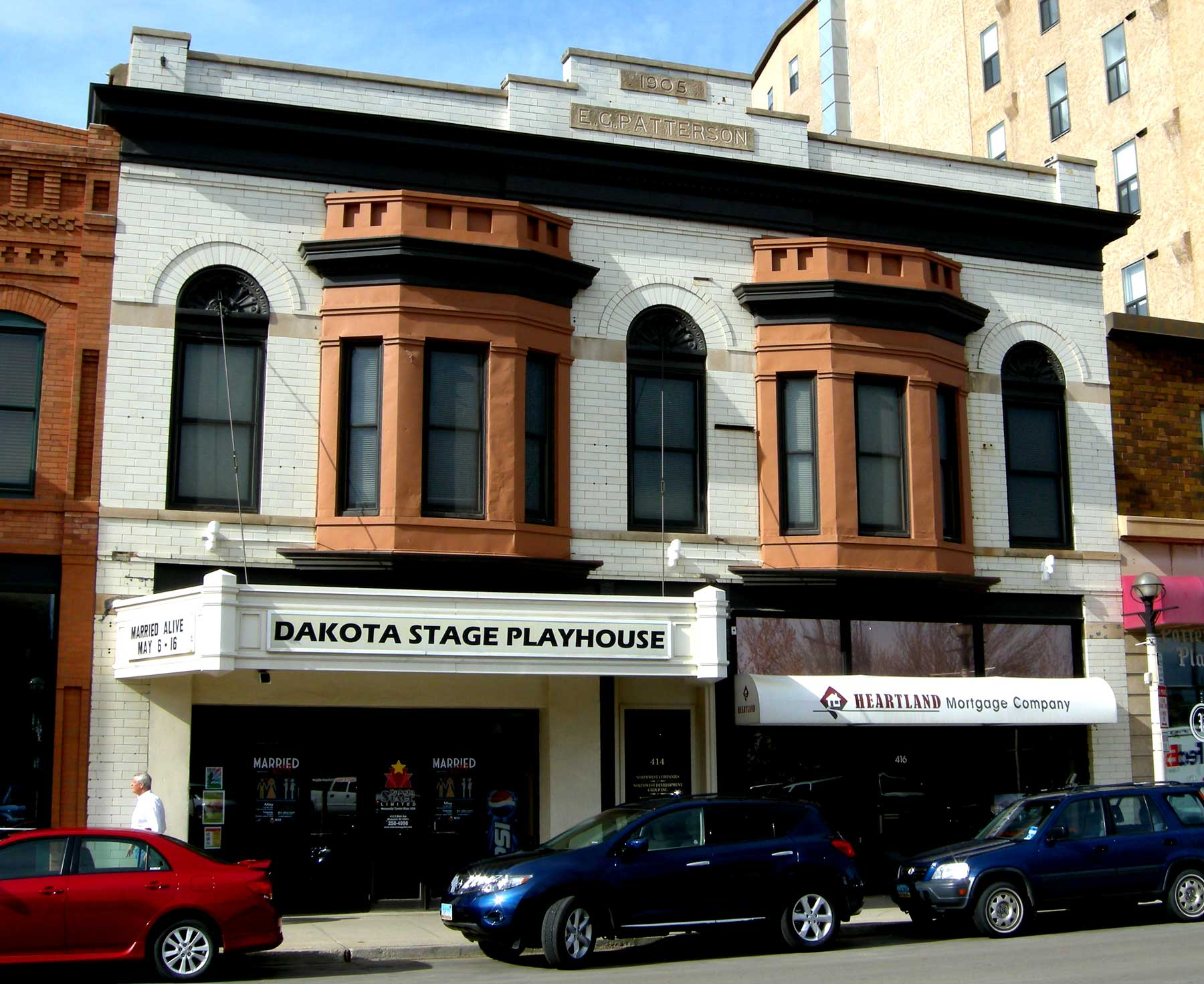

- Location within North Dakota Location within the United States
- Location: 412–414 Main St., Bismarck, North Dakota
- Coordinates: 46°48′20″N 100°47′5″W
- Area: less than one acre
- Built: 1905
- Built by: Milton Earl Beebe
- Architectural style: Early Commercial
- NRHP reference No.: 82001310
- Added to NRHP: October 22, 1982

The E. G. Patterson Building at 412–414 Main St. in Bismarck, North Dakota, United States, was built in 1905. It was listed on the National Register of Historic Places in 1982.

The building was designed by Milton Earl Beebe and is an example of Early Commercial architecture. The theater is now the Dakota Stage Playhouse and was previously the Capitol Theatre and the Cinema Theatre. In the 1970s the theater showed adult films. The theater was next to the Patterson Hotel from 1911 to the 1970s, said to be the most prominent hotel in Bismarck.
