= Soo Hotel =

- U.S. National Register of Historic Places
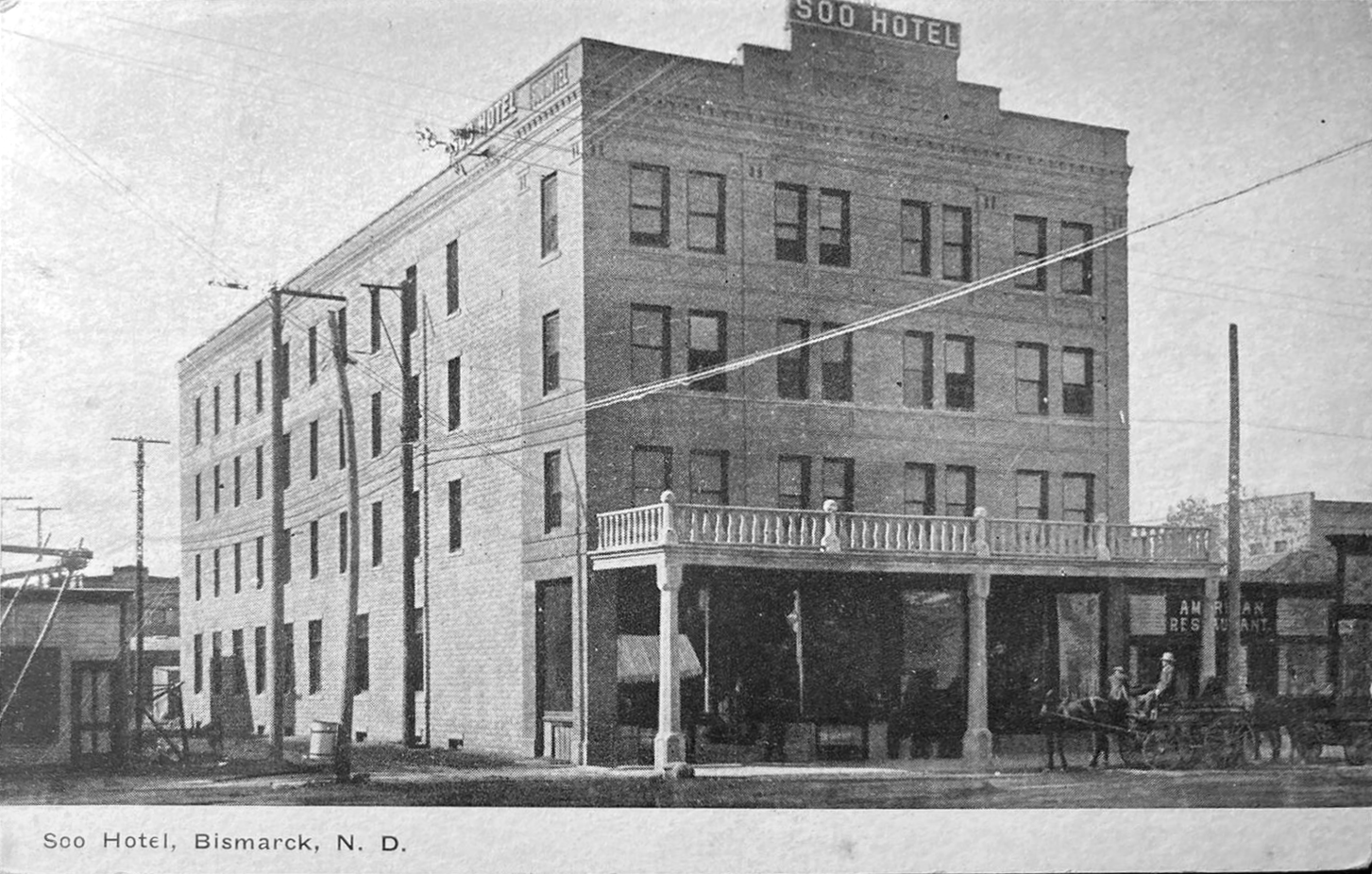
- The Soo shortly after completion c.1907-11

- Location within North Dakota Location within the United States
- Location: 112-114 5th St., N. Bismarck, North Dakota
- Coordinates: 46°48′21″N 100°47′5″W
- Built: 1906
- Architect: Milton Earle Beebe
- NRHP reference No.: 83001927
- Added to NRHP: May 9, 1983

The Soo Hotel was later known as the Princess Hotel, The Patterson Hotel Annex, The Hotel Dakotan, Heritage Recovery Center, and Heritage Apartments. It is a historic building located on Fifth Street North in Bismarck, North Dakota, United States, and was listed on the National Register of Historic Places in 1983. It was built by prominent businessman and political powerhouse Edward Patterson in 1906 as a second-class hotel to his other property, the high-class Northwestern Hotel. The four-floor, 76-room hotel was named after the Soo Line Railroad which had arrived in town in 1902 and whose depot was located several blocks away. It was briefly the tallest building in Bismarck.

== History ==
Edward Patterson chose Fargo architect Milton Earle Beebe to design the hotel. Beebe had previously designed the Patterson Block for him, also listed on the National Register and located around the corner from the Soo on Main Street. The basement and first two floors were constructed of reinforced concrete with the upper walls being tied to concrete facing blocks pressed at the erection site. The third and fourth floors were constructed entirely of six-inch cement blocks with wood framing due to the fourth floor possibly being a last-minute addition. The facade is faced with glazed "Spot-Iron" Hebron pressed brick manufactured by the Hebron Brick Company in Hebron, North Dakota. The building originally sported a tall brick pediment stating the name of the hotel and the date of construction but this was removed sometime after the 1930s.

When completed in early 1907 the building was advertised as "absolutely fireproof" recalling the fire that had destroyed most of downtown Bismarck in 1898. Following the erection of the adjacent McKenzie Hotel in 1911, built by Patterson and owned by Alexander McKenzie, a close friend of Patterson's, the two hotels were connected to allow patrons of the Soo access to the McKenzie's dining facilities.

After McKenzie's passing in 1922, Patterson acquired his hotel and would rename it the Patterson Hotel in March 1927. At the same time Patterson renamed the Soo hotel the Princess. This supposedly was a jab at his arch-rival in the Bismarck business and political world, Edmond A. Hughes, who shortly before had been involved in renaming the Van Horn Hotel, two blocks west, the Prince Hotel. In the mid-1930s, Patterson renamed the Princess the Patterson Hotel Annex. Although it remained a separate hotel, guests had to check in at the Patterson Hotel desk. Around 1950 the hotel came under new ownership and was renamed The Dakotan. At this time the building was separated from the Patterson and as part of a major interior remodel had its own lobby re-constructed as well as having its own elevator installed in the building's light shaft.

With the construction of Interstate 94 in 1964 business began to decline in downtown Bismarck and by the end of the 1970s, the Dakotan closed for business. The upper floors remained vacant until it was renovated in the 1980s by Northwest Development Group headed by Jim Christianson, who has restored many historic buildings in the Bismarck/Mandan area. The ground floor, which originally held the hotel lobby as well as a succession of grocery businesses and a department store, currently houses small stores.

== See also ==
- Patterson Hotel, also NRHP-listed
