= Yegen House and Pioneer Grocery =

Historic house in North Dakota, United States

- Formerly listed on the U.S. National Register of Historic Places
- Location within North Dakota Location within the United States
- Location: 808-810 E. Main Ave., Bismarck, North Dakota
- Coordinates: 46°48′20″N 100°46′44″W
- Area: less than one acre
- Built: 1874
- Architectural style: Boomtown, Other
- NRHP reference No.: 77001023

Significant dates
- Added to NRHP: October 5, 1977
- Removed from NRHP: February 1, 2011

Yegen House and Pioneer Grocery, in Bismarck, North Dakota, was listed on the National Register of Historic Places. It was built in 1874. The owner John Yegen was an immigrant from Switzerland. The listing, in 1977, included three contributing buildings. The site was delisted in 2011, due to the house being demolished and the Grocery being relocated to the Missouri Valley Fairgrounds in 1993.
