= Webb Brothers Block =

- U.S. National Register of Historic Places
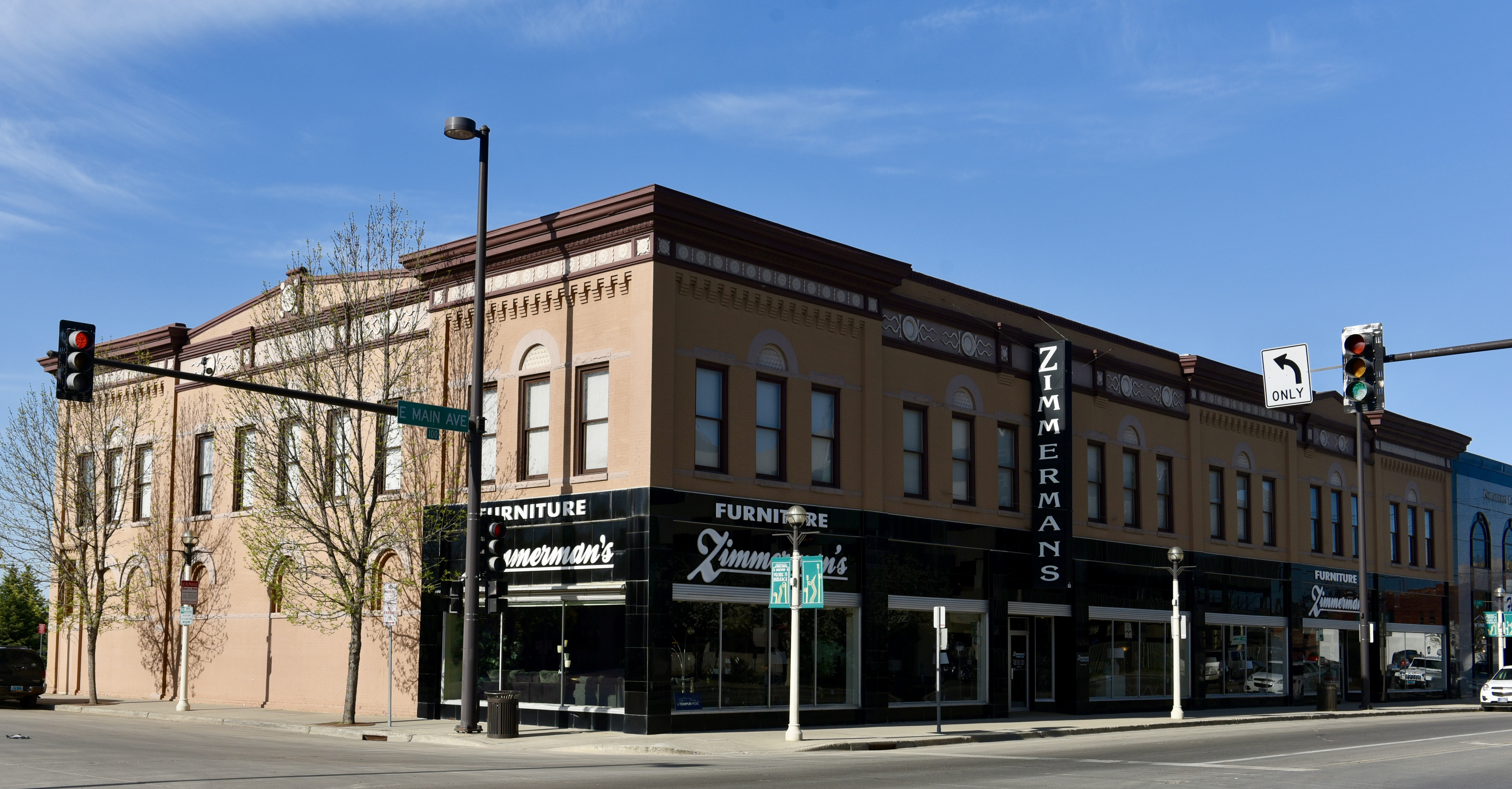
- Webb Brothers Block in 2017

- Location within North Dakota Location within the United States
- Location: 317 E. Main Ave., Bismarck, North Dakota
- Coordinates: 46°48′19″N 100°47′11″W
- Area: 0.5 acres (0.20 ha)
- Built: 1898-1899; 1906
- Architect: Butler & Ryan
- Architectural style: Classical Revival
- NRHP reference No.: 83004060
- Added to NRHP: October 13, 1983

The Webb Brothers Block on E. Main Ave. in Bismarck, North Dakota, United States, has also been known as the Sears Block. The building was built in 1898–1899 with an addition added in 1906. It was listed on the National Register of Historic Places in 1983.

== Webb Brothers Department Store ==
The Webb Brothers Department Store occupied the building from 1899. The Webb brothers, William Henry Webb, Jr. (1862-1945) and Philip Barnard Webb (1859-1952), were born in England and immigrated to the United States with their parents in 1871. They arrived in Dakota Territory in 1883. They came to Bismarck in 1884 and opened a furniture store. In addition to retail, the brothers were also active in real estate in Bismarck. William Webb served as Mayor of Bismarck 1905–1907. In the 1920s, Philip Webb sold his share of the business to his brother and then retired in Los Angeles.
