= Chief Looking's Village site (32BL3) =

Archeological site in North Dakota, US

- U.S. National Register of Historic Places
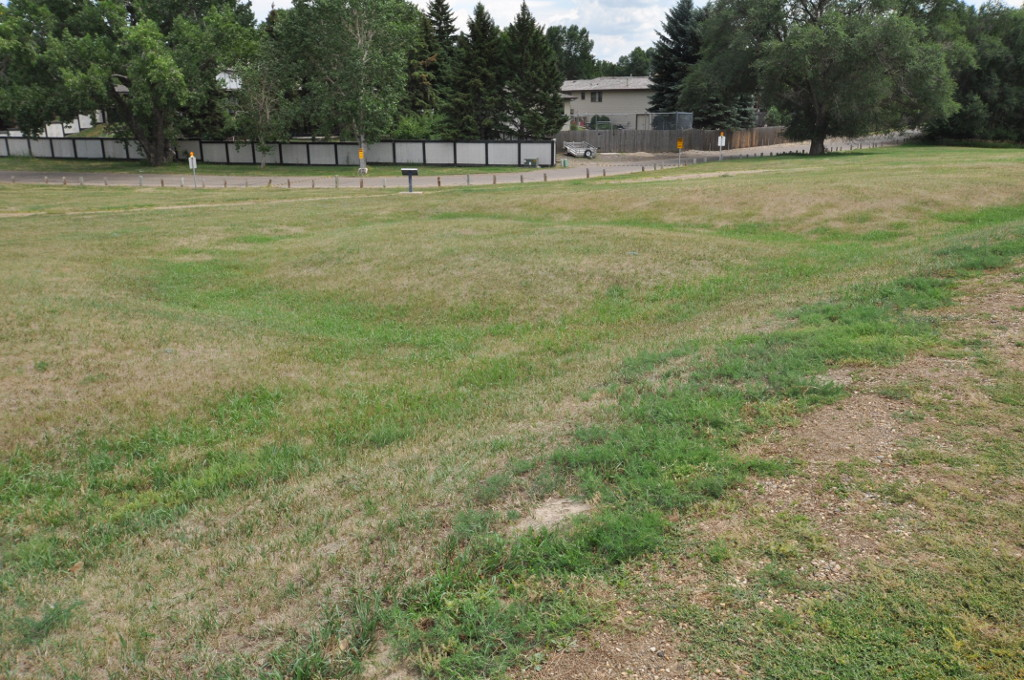

- Location within North Dakota Location within the United States
- Location: Eastern edge of Pioneer Park, Bismarck, North Dakota
- Coordinates: 46°49′48″N 100°49′45″W
- Area: 24 acres (9.7 ha)
- NRHP reference No.: 78001990
- Added to NRHP: November 21, 1978

The Chief Looking's Village Site (32BL3) is a historic archeological site on the east side of Pioneer Park in Bismarck, North Dakota, that was listed in the National Register of Historic Places in 1978. It has also been known as Ward Earth Lodge Village. It was listed on the National Register of Historic Places in 1978.

It is a Mandan village site that, as of its NRHP listing, had never been severely vandalized or disrupted by archeological excavations, so it remained valuable for the information potential that it held.

== See also ==
- Double Ditch Earth Lodge Village Site (32BL8)
