= Double Ditch =

- Double Ditch State Historic Site
- U.S. National Register of Historic Places
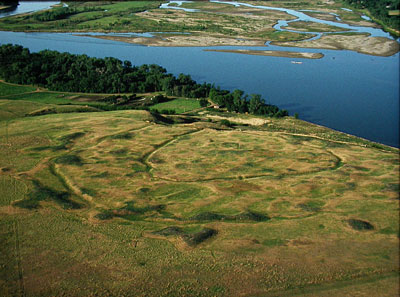
- Aerial view of double ditch site

- Location within North Dakota Location within the United States
- Nearest city: Bismarck, North Dakota
- Coordinates: 46°56′11″N 100°54′03″W
- Area: 37.5 acres (15.2 ha)
- NRHP reference No.: 79001769
- Added to NRHP: January 29, 1979

Double Ditch, also known as the Double Ditch State Historic Site, Burgois Site, 32BL8, Bourgois Site, and Double Ditch Earth Lodge Village Site, is an archaeological site located on the east bank of the Missouri River north of Bismarck, North Dakota, United States. It is named for the two visible trenches that once served as fortifications for the village, but archaeologists found a further two ditches outside these indicating that the population was originally larger.

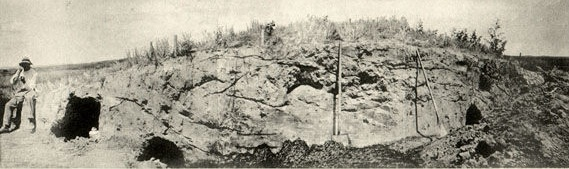
Mound B excavation at Double Ditch Indian Village site, 1905

The site was the location of a Mandan Native American earth lodge village from approximately 1450A.D. to 1785 A.D. It was abandoned after the 1775–1782 North American smallpox epidemic. The site includes remains of earth lodges, midden mounds, and fortification ditches. It is managed by the State Historical Society of North Dakota.

The archeological site was listed on the National Register of Historic Places in 1979. Also at the location are Depression Era Work Relief Construction Features at Double Ditch Indian Village Site State Historic Site, which were separately listed on the National Register in 2014.

== Overview ==
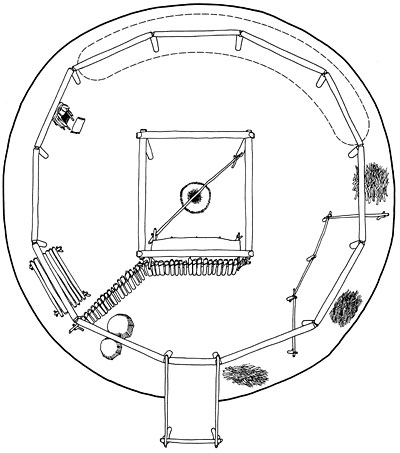
Earthlodge floor plan. This floorplan of a circular earthlodge shows the four post and beam central supports (the square in the center). The wall between the entry and the fireplace helped to prevent drafts from disturbing the fire or chilling the residents. Beds were arranged around the walls.

The Mandans built dome-shaped houses of logs and earth, known as earth-lodges. The raised areas around the village are midden mounds or earthen mounds ranging from one to ten feet high. There are more than 30 mounds surrounding the village. Fortification systems consisted of a deep moat and a wall of wooden posts that formed a palisade. Natural features, such as steep terrain and riverbanks, also were used for added protection.

== Population decline ==
In 2002 Kenneth Kvamme generated digitally enhanced maps of Double Ditch using radio gradiometry techniques. The new survey methods revealed two more ditches, outside the two that were already known, extending the village well beyond its known boundaries. Investigators concluded that at the time of its founding, just before 1500, Double Ditch had a peak population of two thousand and an area of 19 acres. In the mid-to late 1500s, a new trench—ditch 3— was built inside ditch 4. This was also soon abandoned and ditch 2, the outermost of the two ditches still visible constructed inside ditch 3. There was a 20 percent reduction in the area of the town by 1600. The loss of population may have been due to drought or infection. In the mid 18th Century, the innermost (and still visible) fortification ditch was constructed, enclosing an area of four acres, indicating a population at that time of fewer than four hundred. At that time, the entire surface layer of dirt in the village was laboriously scraped off, possibly after a horrific infection.

== Depression Era Work Relief Construction Features ==
- Depression Era Work Relief Construction Features at Double Ditch Indian Village Site State Historic Site
- U.S. National Register of Historic Places
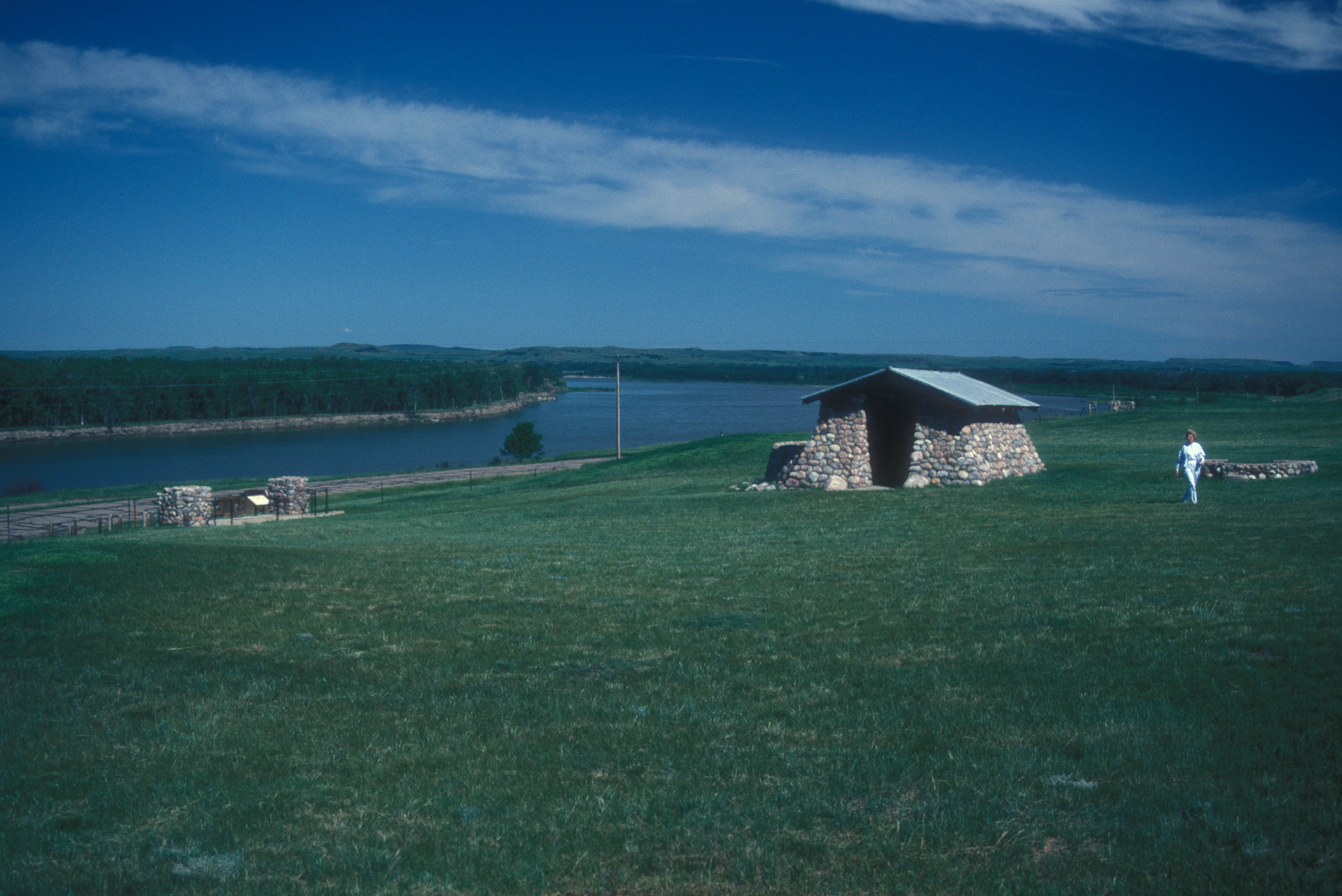
- Structures in 2007

- Location within North Dakota Location within the United States
- Location: State Highway 1804, Burleigh County, North Dakota, near Bismarck
- Area: 37.45 acres (15.16 ha)
- Built: 1930s???
- Built by: CCC?
- Architectural style: WPA Rustic
- MPS: Federal Relief Construction in North Dakota, 1931-1943, MPS
- NRHP reference No.: 14000896
- Added to NRHP: November 5, 2014

Depression Era Work Relief Construction Features at Double Ditch Indian Village Site State Historic Site was listed on the National Register in 2014.

A building and walls built as Great Depression work-relief projects in 1930s???

The listing included one contributing building and eight contributing objects. These are in WPA Rustic style.

The property is owned by the State Historical Society of North Dakota.

== See also ==
- Chief Looking's Village site (32BL3), also a Heart River Mandan village site, also NRHP-listed
- Menoken Indian Village Site, also NRHP-listed
- Depression Era Work Relief Construction Features at Menoken State Historic Site, also NRHP-listed
