= Jennie Foley Building =

- U.S. National Register of Historic Places
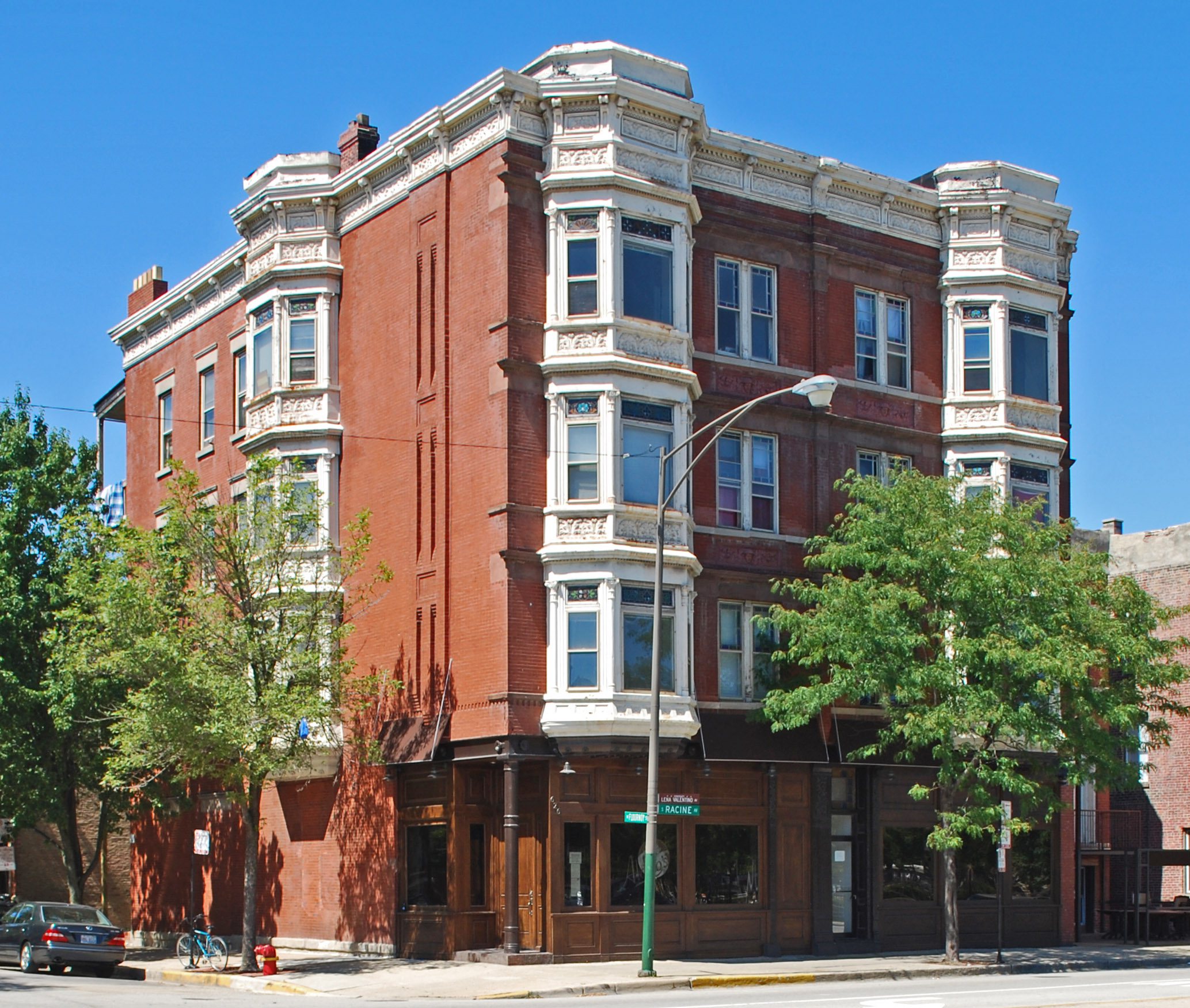

- Location within Chicago metropolitan area
- Location: 626--628 S. Racine Ave., Chicago, Illinois
- Coordinates: 41°52′24″N 87°39′25″W
- Area: 0.3 acres (0.12 ha)
- Built: 1889; 137 years ago
- Architectural style: Chicago
- NRHP reference No.: 85001274
- Added to NRHP: June 19, 1985

The Jennie Foley Building, also known as the Jennie Foley-Victor A. Arrigo Building, is a historic commercial and residential building located at 626-628 S. Racine Ave. in Chicago, Illinois. Built in 1889, the four-story building has a storefront on its first floor and six apartments on its upper stories. The brick building's design features hexagonal bay windows, a metal cornice decorated with scrolls and dentils, and belt courses between floors on the east facade. The building was one of many hybrid commercial and residential buildings constructed in the area, the center of Chicago's Sicilian community in the early twentieth century, though most such buildings have since been demolished. In 1910, the parents of prominent Chicago lawyer and politician Victor A. Arrigo purchased the building; Arrigo lived in the building until his death in 1973.

The building was listed on the National Register of Historic Places on June 19, 1985.
