= James W. Foley House =

Historic house in North Dakota, United States

- Formerly listed on the U.S. National Register of Historic Places
- Location within North Dakota Location within the United States
- Location: 522 6th St., Bismarck, North Dakota(Former location. Currently at:)
- Coordinates: 46.807197°N 100.726699°W,
- Area: less than one acre
- Built: 1907
- NRHP reference No.: 77001021

Significant dates
- Added to NRHP: September 13, 1977
- Removed from NRHP: January 31, 1994

The James W. Foley House on 6th St. in Bismarck, North Dakota, United States, was built in 1907. It was listed on the National Register of Historic Places (NRHP) in 1977 but was delisted in 1994, when it was relocated to the Missouri Valley Fairgrounds. It has also been known as the Elan Art Gallery.
