= Peaceful Valley Ranch =

- U.S. National Register of Historic Places
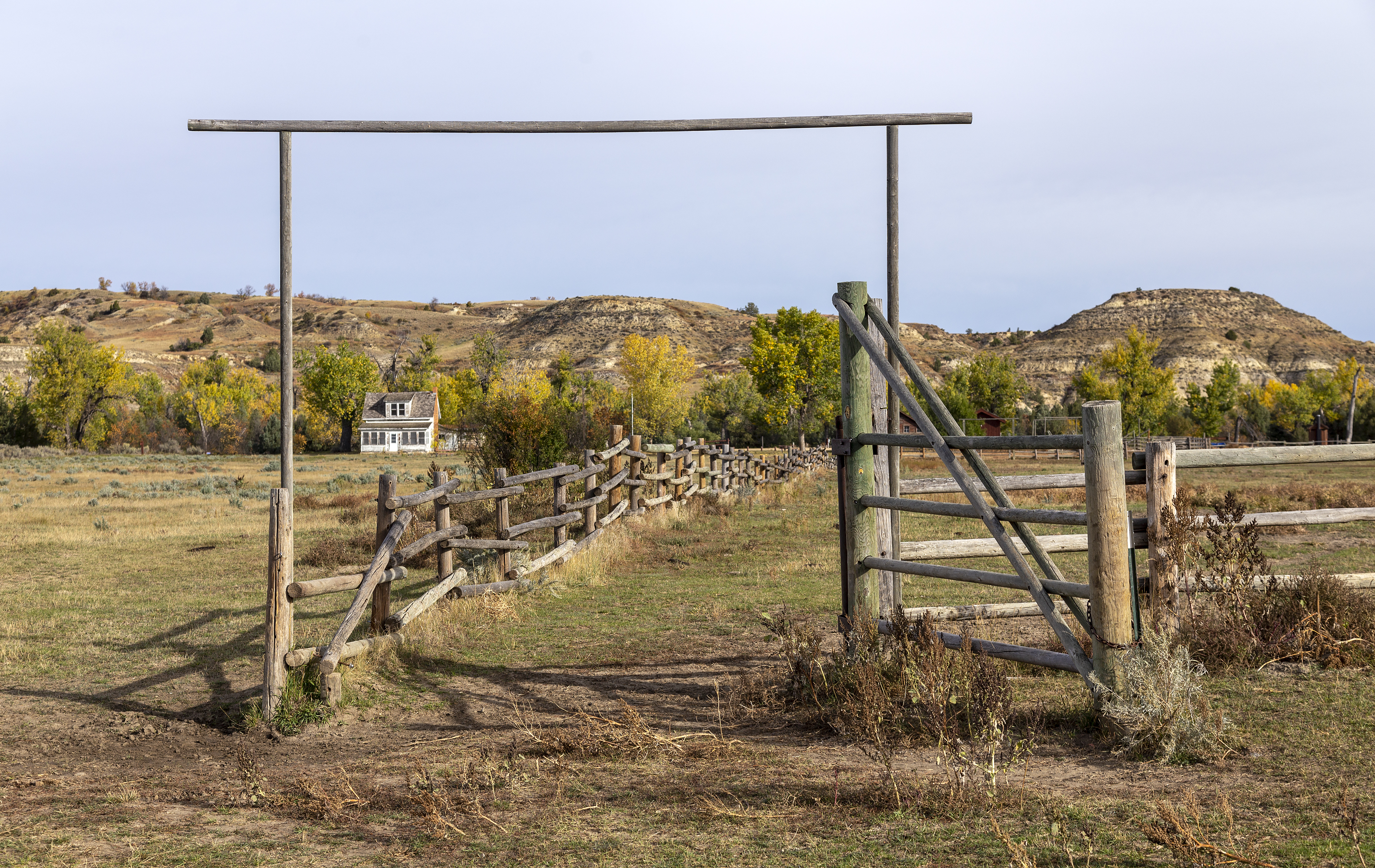
- Peaceful Valley Ranch in 2018

- Location within North Dakota Location within the United States
- Nearest city: Medora, North Dakota
- Coordinates: 46°57′32″N 103°30′13″W
- Area: less than one acre
- Built: 1885
- Built by: Lamb, Benjamin F.; Burgess, George
- Architectural style: Late Victorian
- NRHP reference No.: 94000731
- Added to NRHP: July 13, 1994

Peaceful Valley Ranch is about 3 miles (4.8 km) from the town of Medora, North Dakota in the South Unit of Theodore Roosevelt National Park, in western North Dakota. The ranch dates from 1885, when Benjamin Lamb bought the land and built its first buildings. After operating as a ranch, primarily raising horses, the ranch was developed by the Olsen family as a dude ranch before it was acquired by the National Park Service, and incorporated into the Roosevelt Recreation Demonstration Area, which eventually became the present national park. The ranch forms the core of the national park's South Unit. It overlooks the Little Missouri River, in the Little Missouri badlands.

== History ==
The first permanent European resident of the Peaceful Valley area was Eldridge G. (Gerry) Paddock. Paddock had been a guide for the Northern Pacific Railway and for George Armstrong Custer, and assistant to Medora promoter the Marquis de Morès. Paddock built a cabin about .25 miles (0.40 km) south of the present ranch site in the summer of 1883. Paddock's son Billy sold the range rights in 1885 to Benjamin S. Lamb, a 22-year old rancher, variously stated to have come from Ohio or Boston. Lamb may have arrived as a remittance man from Boston. Sources speculate that he may have been a relative of Hugh Lamb, an architect with ties to Theodore Roosevelt, who in turn was involved in ranching in the Medora area. Lamb was a member of the Little Missouri Stockmen's Association, and held office as a Billings County probate judge and county treasurer.

The buildings were sold in 1890 to Joe Caughtin and Tom McDonahue, who sold them on to George and Nettie Burgess between 1896 and 1898. The Burgesses obtained homestead patents for the lands around the ranch in 1906. The Burgesses sold the ranch to Harry W. Olsen in 1915, and his brother Carl. Carl eventually assumed ownership of the ranch, keeping horses, cattle, turkeys and chickens, and growing crops to feed the animals. By 1918 Carl began to operate the ranch as a dude ranch, taking advantage of the nearby petrified forest. In 1922 the ranch became known as Peaceful Valley Ranch.

Carl Olsen was a prominent advocate for the establishment of a national park in the Little Missouri badlands. In 1928 the ranch hosted Stephen Mather, the director of the National Park Service, on a visit to review national park candidates. In 1936 the Olsen family sold the ranch to the National Park Service, establishing the core of the Roosevelt Recreation Demonstration Area.

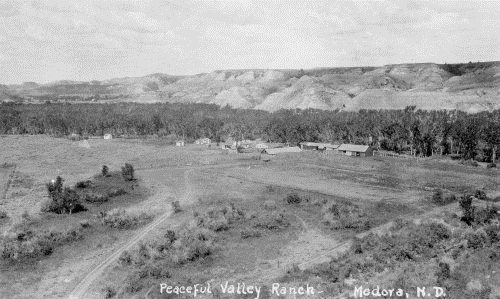
Peaceful Valley Ranch c. 1922

A Civilian Conservation Corps camp had already been established in August, 1934, developing roads in the area on state-owned lands for the Emergency Relief Administration and the Works Progress Administration. The ranch became the Demonstration Area headquarters, and remained so after 1947, when the area was formally designated Theodore Roosevelt National Memorial Park. When a new visitor center was built in 1959 as part of the Mission 66 program, the ranch lost most of its functions, becoming a Park Service residence until 1965. In 1967 the ranch became a concessioner-operated facility for horseback riding. In 1978 the park was re-designated Theodore Roosevelt National Park. The riding concession operated until 2014.

A plan developed in the early 1960s envisioned the demolition of the ranch structures and their replacement with a demonstration area simulating what was thought to be a more authentic ranch complex, to be called the Longhorn Ranch. The development was never carried out.

== Description ==
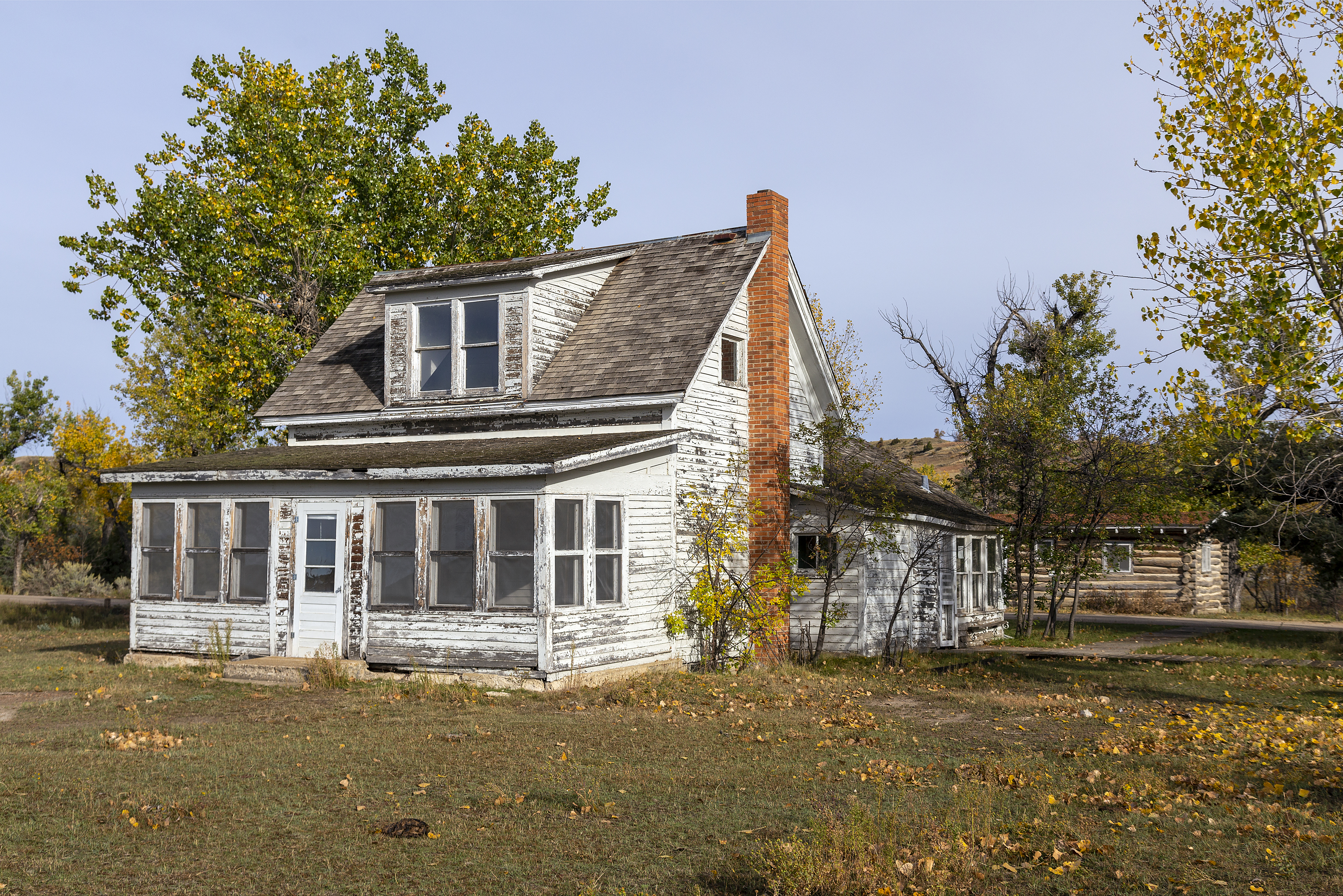
Peaceful Valley Ranch, main house in 2018

The ranch comprises nine main structures. The main ranch house is a 1 1/2-story frame building constructed by Benjamin Lamb. The central portion of the house is abutted on the front and north sides by enclosed porches, and on the rear by a log extension . The roof features prominent shed dormers on the front and back. To the north of the main house is a one-story log lodge, built for dude ranch functions. A 1905 log barn to the east is the other principal building. The remaining buildings were built by the Park Service. for visitor support facilities. The complex includes an extensive corral.

The surrounding area includes the ruins of a dugout structure that may have been used by trappers before the establishment of the ranch. The Paddock cabin, near the main road junction, was most probably lost to road construction in the 1930s.

The main house is, with the Maltese Cross Cabin, one of two remaining structures in the park from the settlement of western North Dakota, and the only one on its original site. It is unusual in being of frame construction, at a time when most buildings in the area were built with logs.

Peaceful Valley Ranch was listed on the National Register of Historic Places on July 13, 1994.
