= Theodore Roosevelt Presidential Library =

Presidential library and museum

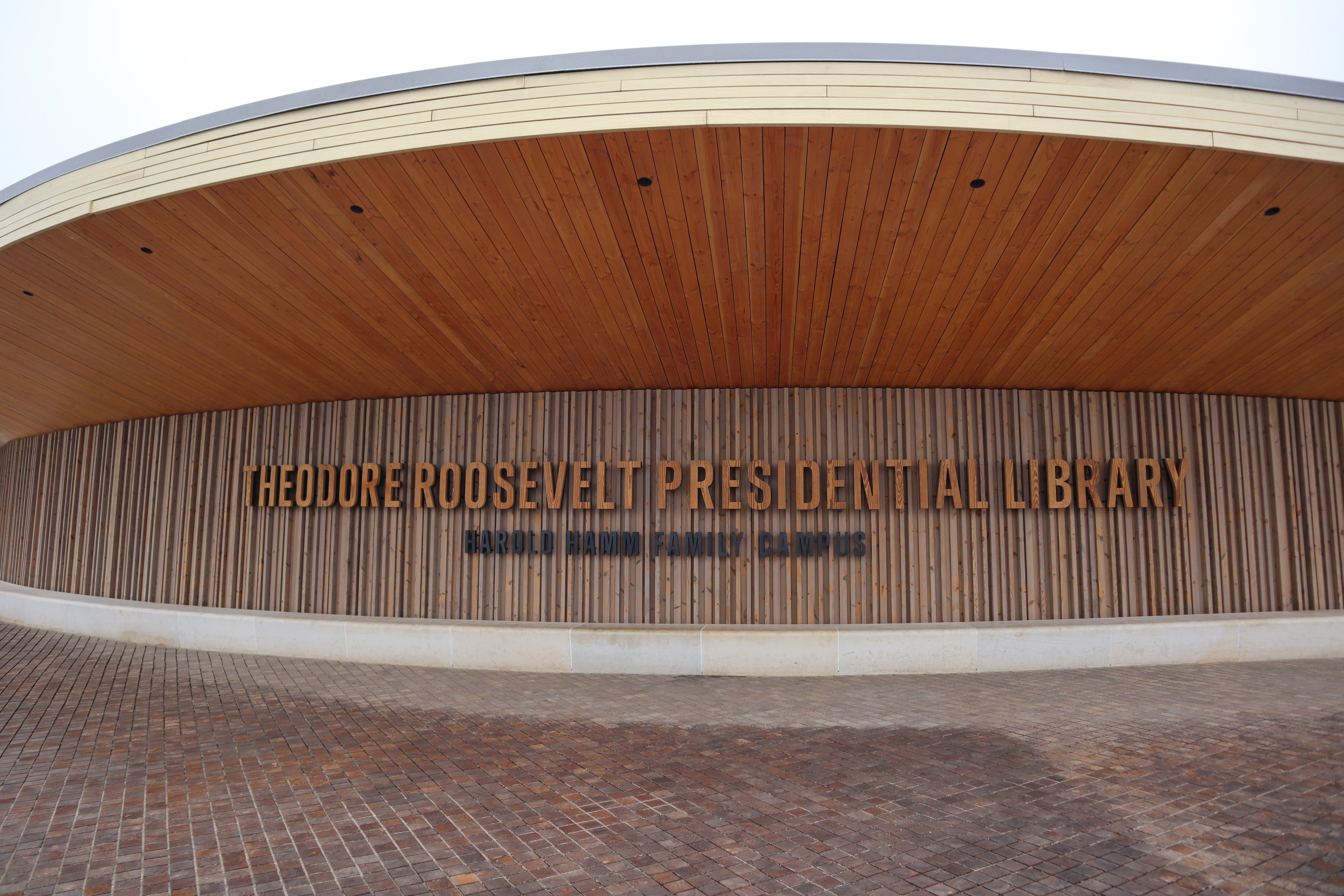

- Location in the United States Location in North Dakota

General information
- Location: Medora, North Dakota, United States
- Coordinates: 46°55′02.6″N 103°32′57.2″W
- Named for: Theodore Roosevelt
- Construction started: Summer 2023
- Completed: July 4, 2026
- Operator: Theodore Roosevelt Presidential Library Foundation

Design and construction
- Architect: Snøhetta

Website
- https://www.trlibrary.com/

The Theodore Roosevelt Presidential Library is a museum in North Dakota focused on the life and legacy of Theodore Roosevelt, the 26th president of the United States. It is not one of the 16 official Presidential Libraries, but instead a non-NARA museum. Roosevelt's presidential records are primarily held at the Library of Congress. The library was constructed by a private non-profit.

The museum is at a site to the west of Medora, near Theodore Roosevelt National Park, which preserves sites associated with Roosevelt's travel and life in Dakota Territory between 1883 and 1887. A site in the Badlands of Medora was selected in 2020, as well as the design architect Snøhetta and the architect of record JLG Architects.

== Design ==
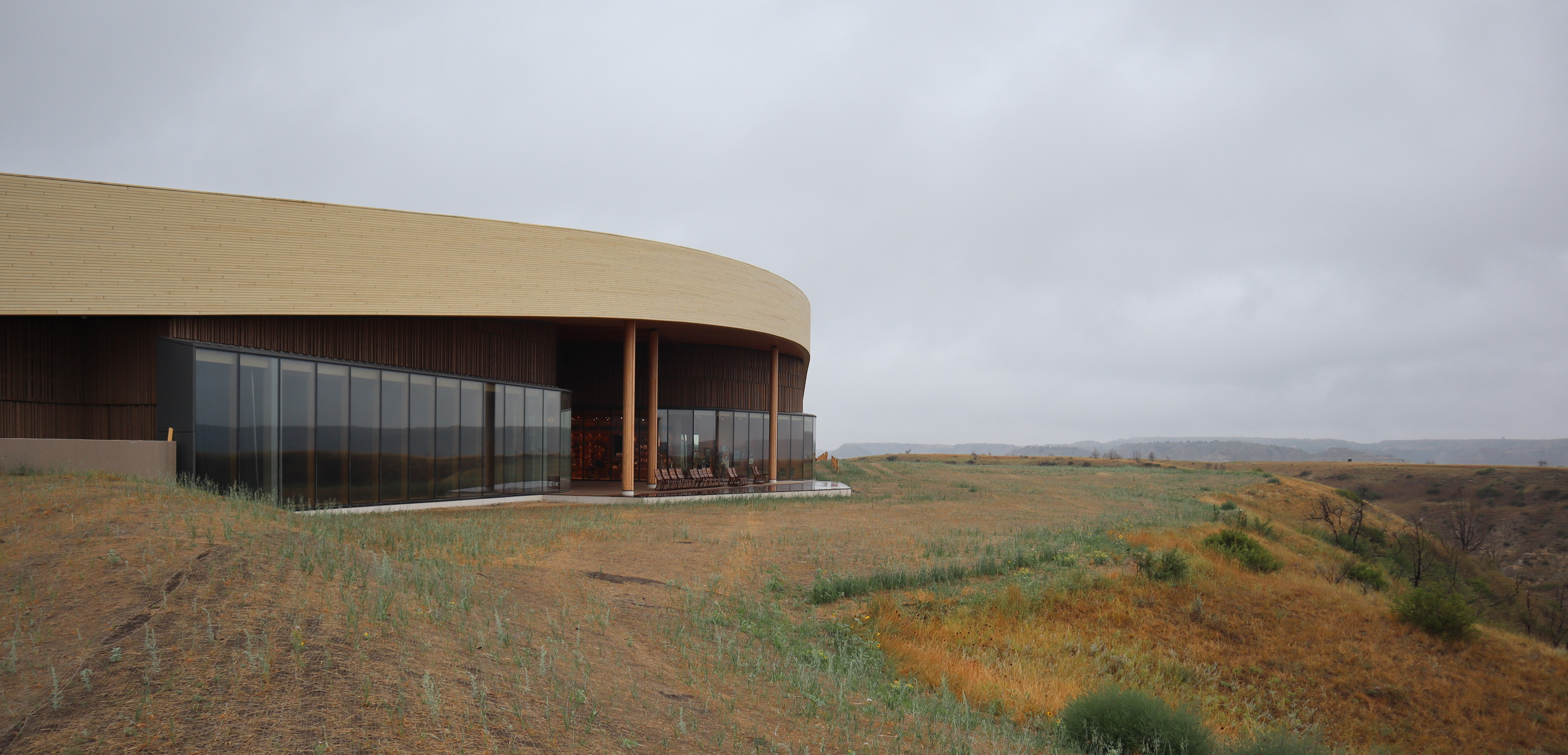
The building in 2026

A 93-acre (38 ha) site was selected in March 2020 from eleven candidates on land owned by the U.S. Forest Service, about 1.5 miles (2.4 km) west of Medora, close to the entrance to the south unit of Theodore Roosevelt National Park. The site includes a section of the Maah Daah Hey Trail, and includes grassland and Badland terrain. Congress passed legislation to allow and direct the U.S. Secretary of Agriculture to sell the land, which was owned by the U.S. Forest Service up to this point.

An initial field of forty architectural firms was narrowed to fourteen firms, which were all invited to compete to serve as the Design Architect for the library. Twelve firms participated and after a series of interviews and presentations, the Foundation announced three finalists: Snøhetta, Studio Gang, and Henning Larsen. These three firms were provided stipends to develop design concepts. Snøhetta– the Norway-based company known for its projects including the National September 11 Museum, Oslo Opera House, and Bibliotheca Alexandrina, among others–was selected in September 2020 to design the museum.

The library building is 93,000 square feet. The building cost $450 million.

== Location selection ==
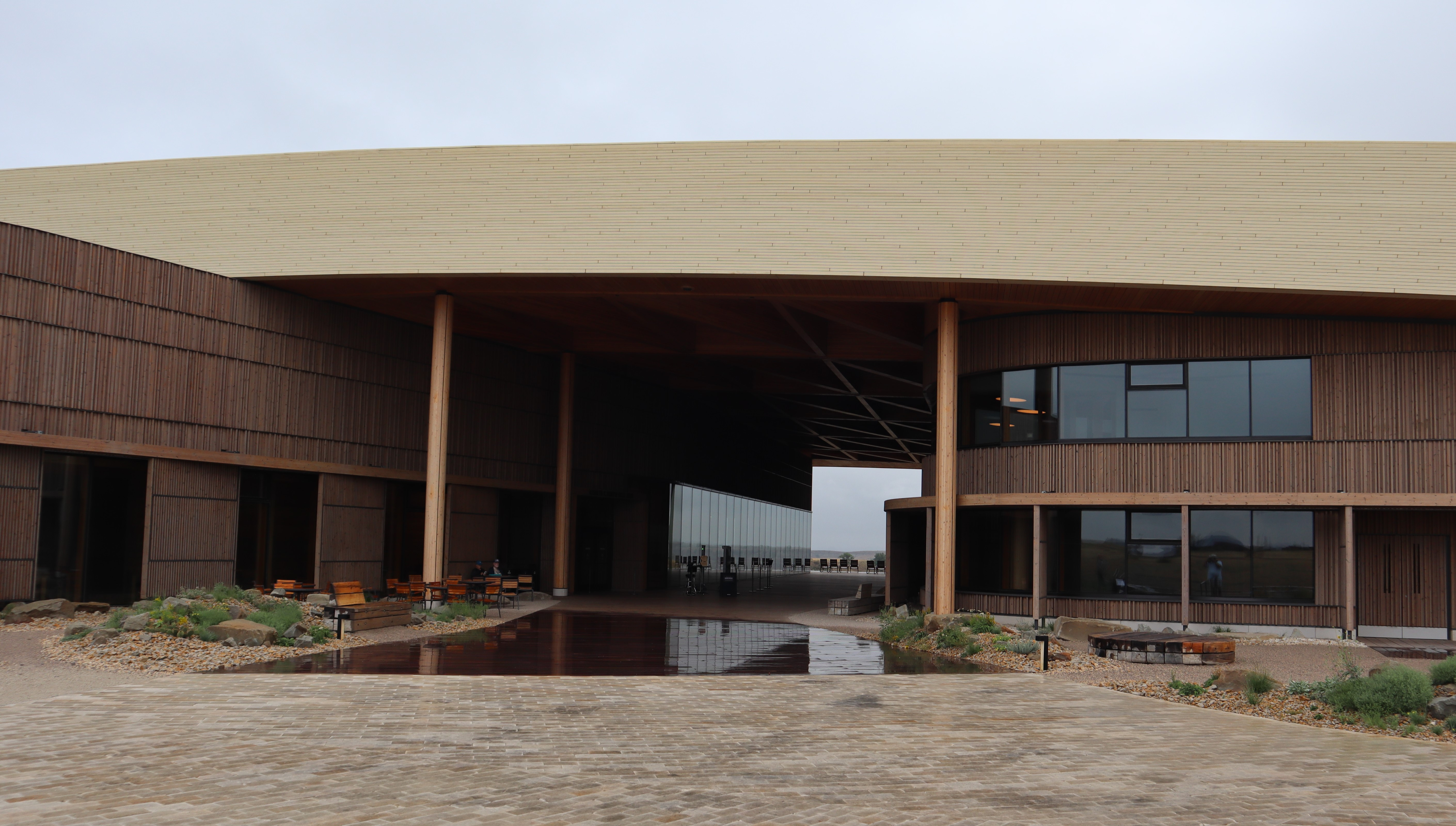
The building's plaza

The museum is in North Dakota due in large part to both local and regional enthusiasm for the project, and Theodore Roosevelt's personal connections to the state. Some view it as a calculated risk to locate it where local population is not large. The state of North Dakota sees it as a logical place, though Roosevelt’s time at his ranch was not long.

Theodore Roosevelt first came to the North Dakota Badlands on September 8, 1883. Roosevelt arrived with the intent to hunt bison, but he subsequently formed a deeper connection with the land–so much so that he invested in two ranches in the area: the Maltese Cross and the Elkhorn. Roosevelt would return after the tragic deaths of both his wife, Alice, and mother, Mittie, on Valentine's Day in 1884. He sought refuge, healing, and strength in the landscape–Roosevelt famously said the region is where the "romance of my life began."

Roosevelt would view his time in North Dakota fondly. He once said that if he was ever forced to retain just one memory from his life, he "would take the memory of my life on the ranch, with its experiences close to Nature and among the men who lived nearest her." Roosevelt, while campaigning for North Dakotans' votes on a whistle stop tour, told them, "I never would have been President if it had not been for my experiences in North Dakota."

In 2019 the North Dakota Legislative Assembly authorized a $50 million operating endowment for the proposed museum, to be made available after the foundation raised $100 million for construction; the Foundation has since reached this milestone, unlocking the $50 million.

== Board, staff, and supporters ==
The presidential library project's office in downtown Medora, as seen in 2021

During the period of planning, design, and construction, the presidential library project was housed in a small office in downtown Medora.

Hilary Hamm is Chair of the Theodore Roosevelt Presidential Library Foundation Board of Trustees.

Former media executive and Roosevelt scholar Edward O'Keefe served as CEO from 2019 until September 18, 2026, leading the project through its opening, and then joined the Board of Trustees. Robbie Lauf, the library's executive director since 2024, became interim CEO on September 19, 2026, while the board conducts a national search for a permanent CEO.

Doug Burgum, United States secretary of the interior and former North Dakota governor, supports the effort, citing the state's "opportunity to build a presidential library in honor of one of the most dynamic, influential, and world-changing presidents in the history of the US,” alongside the museum's potential impacts on economic, academic, and tourism development within the state. Theodore Roosevelt V, President Roosevelt's great grandson, has also played a prominent role advocating for the museum within the state. In 2020, the Roosevelt family purchased the 90.3 acres of land on which the museum sits.

== History ==
President Donald Trump attends the dedication of the library on July 1, 2026

In January 2022, the Equestrian Statue of Theodore Roosevelt, which stood outside the American Museum of Natural History in New York City facing Central Park West since the 1940s, was removed and will be on a long-term loan to the museum. The museum has yet to determine how and where the statue will be displayed on the grounds. The statue attracted controversy resulting from perceptions of the African and Native American figures standing alongside a horse-mounted Roosevelt.

The museum opened to the public on the 250th anniversary of the nation on July 4, 2026. A dedication ceremony was held by President Donald Trump on July 1. By September the library announced it had reached 100,000 visitors.
