= Ed O'Keefe (disambiguation) =

Ed O'Keefe (born 1983) is an American political correspondent.

Edward, Eddie or Ed O'Keefe may also refer to:

- Ed O'Keefe (footballer) (1913–1986), Australian rules half-back
- Edward O'Keefe (born 1978), American presidential librarian
- Eddie O'Keefe (born 1988), American director of Shangri-La Suite

== See also ==
- Edward O'Keeffe (born 1942), Irish politician a/k/a Ned O'Keeffe
