= Statue of Theodore Roosevelt =

Statue of Theodore Roosevelt may refer to:

- Equestrian Statue of Theodore Roosevelt (New York City), U.S.
- Theodore Roosevelt, Rough Rider, Portland, Oregon, U.S.
