= Buckhorn Trail =

Trail in North Dakota, USA

Coordinates: 47°35′47″N 103°19′57″W

The Buckhorn Trail is an eleven-mile loop in the North Unit of Theodore Roosevelt National Park, North Dakota. The trail begins and ends in a parking lot directly across from the North Unit Campground. Free permits are available for backcountry camping upon arrival.
