= Theodore Roosevelt's Maltese Cross Cabin =

Cabin used by Theodore Roosevelt

Coordinates: 46.9169°N 103.5262°W

The Maltese Cross Cabin is a cabin that was used by Theodore Roosevelt, before he was President. The cabin is currently located at the visitor center at Theodore Roosevelt National Park, just outside the town of Medora, North Dakota.

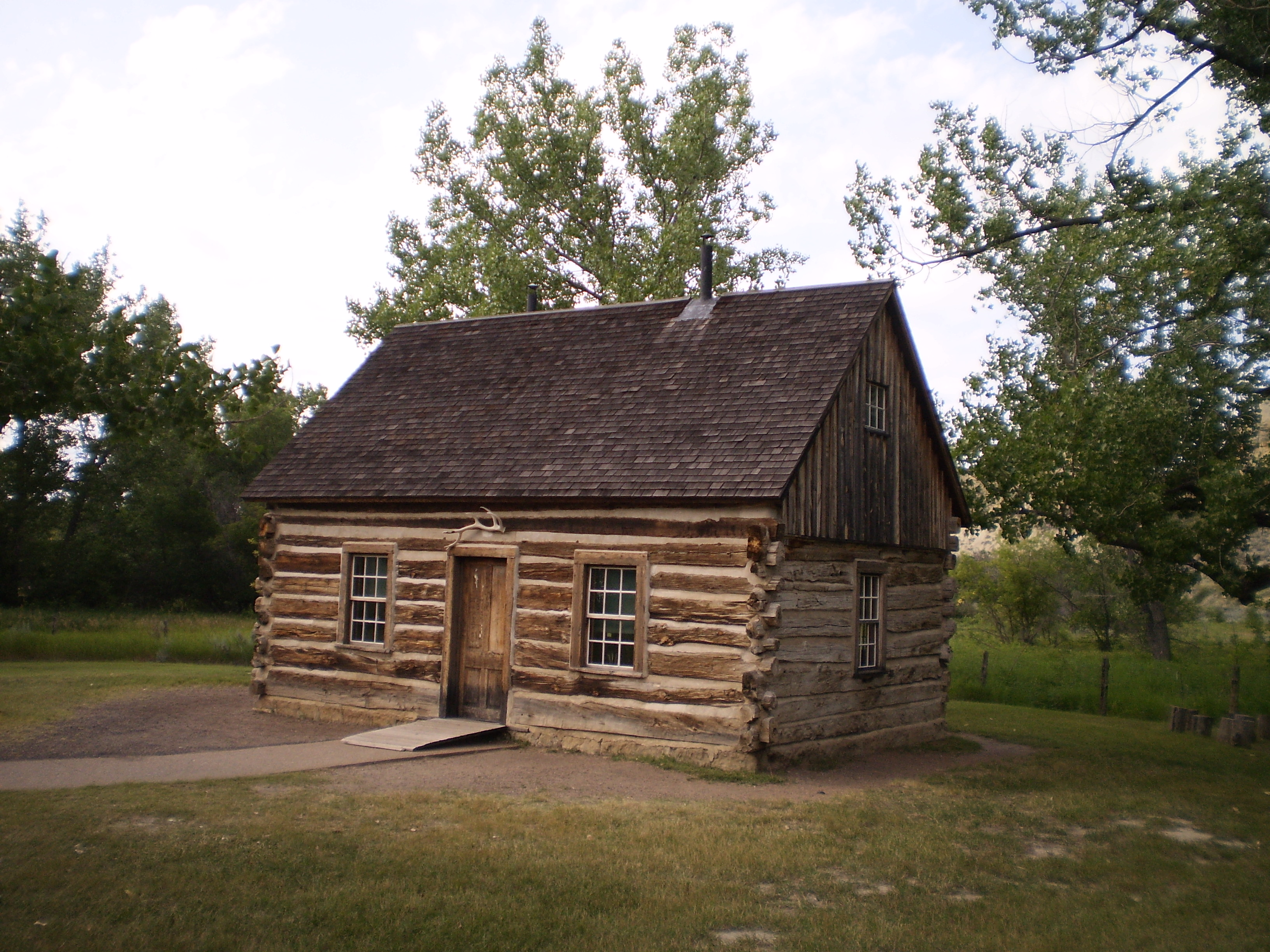
Theodore Roosevelt's Maltese Cross Cabin

== History ==
This was Theodore Roosevelt's first cabin in the Dakota Territory. It was used by Roosevelt from 1883 to 1884, before he became president. Like many other ranchers in Dakota Territory, Roosevelt squatted on public lands, or lands owned by the Northern Pacific Railroad. Roosevelt did not own any acreage during his time in the territory, and the Maltese Cross (Chimney Butte) Ranch had already been named previously.

After his wife and mother died in 1884, only hours apart, Roosevelt became depressed. He then left the cabin and went further north down the Little Missouri River, where he constructed his new Elkhorn Ranch cabin, where he spent most of his time.

In 1901, at the dawn of the 20th century, Theodore Roosevelt became the nation's 26th president and ultimately one of its greatest conservationists. He later said, "I would not have been President had it not been for my experience in North Dakota."

It was here in the North Dakota badlands in 1883 that Theodore Roosevelt first arrived to hunt a buffalo. Before he left, he had acquired primary interests in the Maltese Cross Ranch (also called the Chimney Butte Ranch). Roosevelt thrived on the vigorous outdoor lifestyle, and, at the Maltese Cross, actively participated in the life of a working cowboy.

The Maltese Cross Ranch cabin was originally located about seven miles south of Medora in the wooded bottom-lands of the Little Missouri River. At Roosevelt's request, ranch managers Sylvane Ferris and Bill Merrifield built a 1 1/2-story cabin complete with a shingled roof and root cellar. Constructed of durable ponderosa pine logs, the cabin was considered somewhat of a "mansion" in its day, with wooden floors and three separate rooms (kitchen, living room and Roosevelt's bedroom). The steeply pitched roof, an oddity on the northern plains, created an upstairs sleeping loft for the ranch hands.

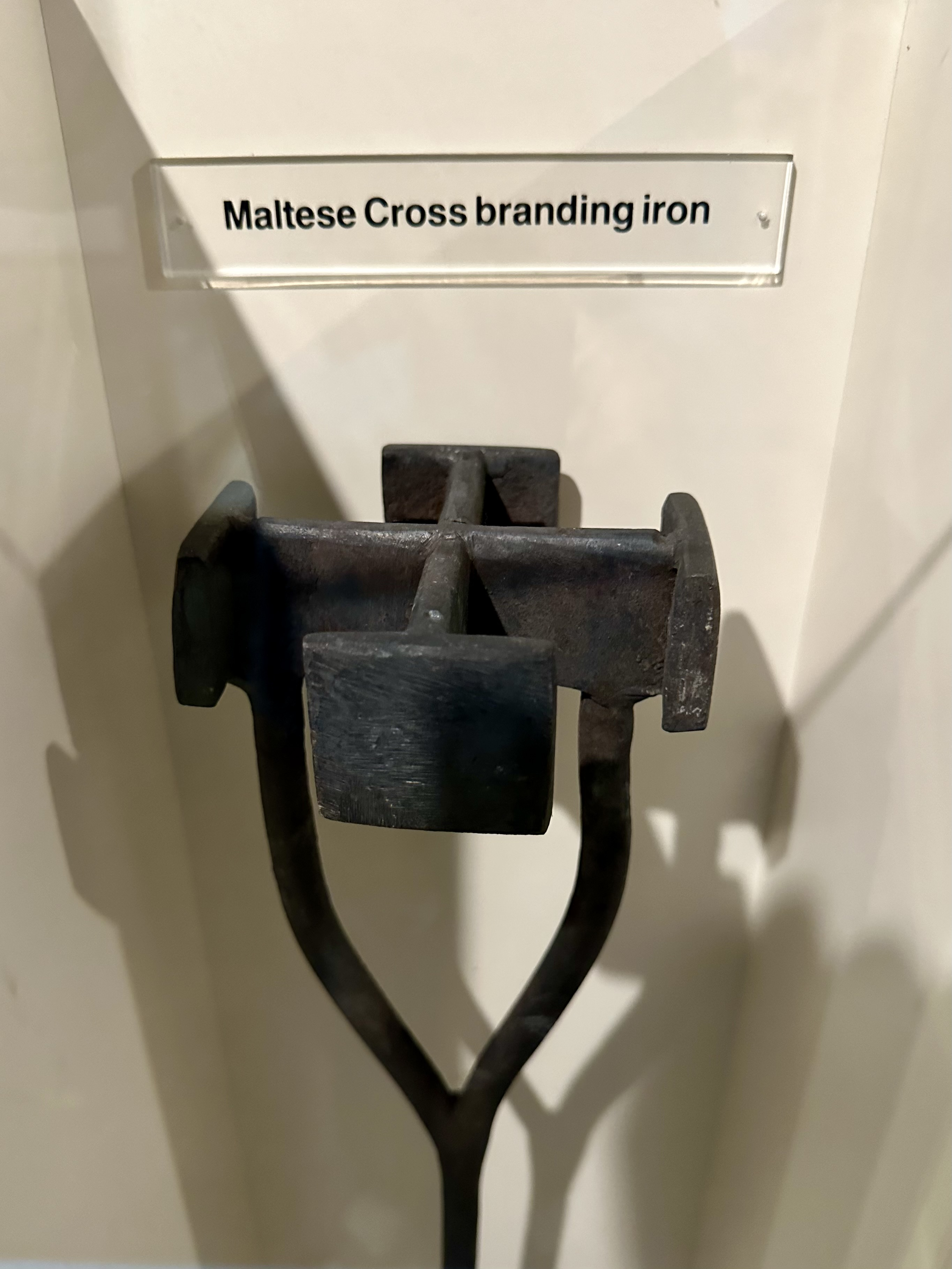
Maltese Cross Branding Iron

Several items present in the cabin today did belong to Theodore Roosevelt, but the majority of the furnishings are period pieces representing a typical cabin of the time. The white hutch in the main room is original to the cabin and was used as a bookcase and writing desk. The classically styled desk is from the Elkhorn Ranch cabin. Roosevelt spent many hours at his desk, recording his experiences and memoirs of badlands life.

The common rocking chair is believed to have been Roosevelt's, or may have come from an upstairs room in the Ferris Store where Roosevelt stayed on occasion. Rocking chairs were his favorite piece of furniture; all of his homes had rocking chairs, and Roosevelt once wrote, "What true American does not enjoy a rocking-chair?"

Roosevelt's traveling trunk sits in the bedroom and is inscribed with his initials. The large leather trunk traveled back and forth with him on the train from his home in New York City to the stop in Medora and would have held clothing and personal items.

Roosevelt actively ranched in the badlands only until early 1887, but maintained ranching interests in the area until 1898. Later, as president, he developed a conservation program that deeply reflected his many experiences in the West. It was through these experiences that he became keenly aware of the need to conserve and protect natural resources.

During Roosevelt's presidency, the Maltese Cross cabin was exhibited at the World's Fair in St. Louis, Missouri and at the Lewis and Clark Centennial Exposition in Portland, Oregon in 1905. In 1910, it was moved again, this time, to the state fairgrounds in West Fargo, North Dakota and then eventually on the state capitol grounds in Bismarck where it remained until 1959 before the cabin was relocated to its present site and renovated. The most recent preservation work occurred in 2000.

Roosevelt's second ranch, the Elkhorn, was built in 1884 and was located about 35 miles north of Medora on the Little Missouri River. After its construction, Roosevelt considered the Elkhorn his "home ranch" and spent most of his time there whenever he was in residence in the Dakotas.

== Today ==
The Maltese Cross Cabin was later abandoned for a time, but is now preserved and maintained properly by the National Park Service. It is located within Theodore Roosevelt National Park, and designated as a historic landmark. Some personal effects of Theodore Roosevelt remain on display in the cabin. Tours of the cabin are held from mid June-Labor Day. The rest of the year, the cabin is self-guided.

The original location of this cabin was several miles away. Because of its smaller size the cabin was able to be moved around the state on a public tour, but was relocated to the current site after restoration. Nothing remains of his subsequent cabin, located in a much more remote area at the Elkhorn Ranch, except some cornerstones, foundation blocks, and a well which is covered for safety. "I do not believe there ever was any life more attractive to a vigorous young fellow than life on a cattle ranch in those days. It was a fine, healthy life, too; it taught a man self-reliance, hardihood, and the value of instant decision...I enjoyed the life to the full."

== See also ==
- List of residences of presidents of the United States
- Presidential memorials in the United States
- Theodore Roosevelt Presidential Library
- Elkhorn, 2024 television series
