= Elkhorn Ranch =

United States historic center

- Theodore Roosevelt's Elkhorn Ranch and Greater Elkhorn Ranchlands
- U.S. National Register of Historic Places
- U.S. Historic district
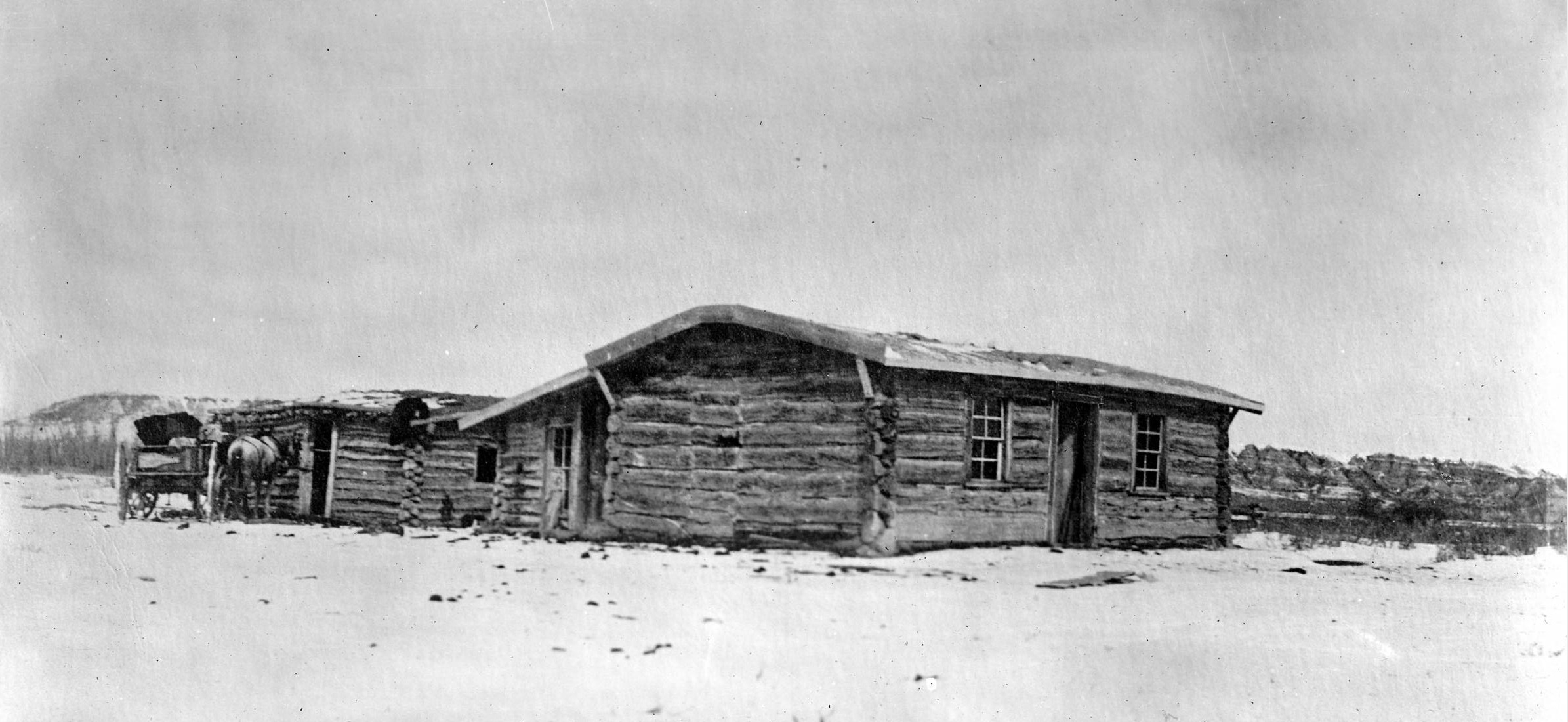
- Elkhorn Ranch house c. 1885

- Location within North Dakota Location within the United States
- Location: Billings County, North Dakota
- Nearest city: Medora, North Dakota
- Coordinates: 47°14′02″N 103°37′13″W
- NRHP reference No.: 12000252
- Added to NRHP: September 28, 2012

The Elkhorn Ranch was established by Theodore Roosevelt on the banks of the Little Missouri River 35 miles north of Medora, North Dakota in the summer of 1884. Roosevelt hired Bill Sewall and Wilmot Dow, two Maine woodsmen, to run the ranch. Sewall and Dow built the ranch house, "a long, low house of logs," in the winter of 1884–1885.

The Elkhorn Ranch was Theodore Roosevelt's "main ranch", and his preferred ranch house because it was larger and more private than his Maltese Cross Ranch cabin, established in 1883. Roosevelt particularly enjoyed sitting in the veranda in a rocking chair, reading in the shade of the cottonwood trees. His enjoyment is evident in his books, Ranch Life and the Hunting Trail, Hunting Trips of a Ranchman, and The Wilderness Hunter.

In the spring of 1886, thieves stole Roosevelt's boat from the Elkhorn Ranch. Sewall and Dow hastily built a raft and all three set off downriver to catch the thieves. When they did, Roosevelt kept watch over the three thieves with a shotgun and marched them overland to Dickinson, North Dakota, where he collected a $50 reward.

Roosevelt quit the ranch in 1887 after losing 60% of his stock in the starvation winter of 1886–87, and returned only a handful of times to the badlands after that. He kept a small share of the cattle until 1898 at the outset of the Spanish–American War. He sold the ranch in 1888, and by 1901 there was nothing left of the ranch house except its foundation.

== Today ==
The Elkhorn Ranch Site itself is protected as a unit of Theodore Roosevelt National Park, and is listed on the National Register of Historic Places. Theodore Roosevelt's writing desk from the Elkhorn Ranch is on display at Theodore Roosevelt National Park.

== See also ==
- Yule Ranch
- Elkhorn, a 2024 television series about Roosevelt's life in Dakota
- List of residences of presidents of the United States
