= Equestrian Statue of Theodore Roosevelt (New York City) =

Equestrian statue by James Earle Fraser

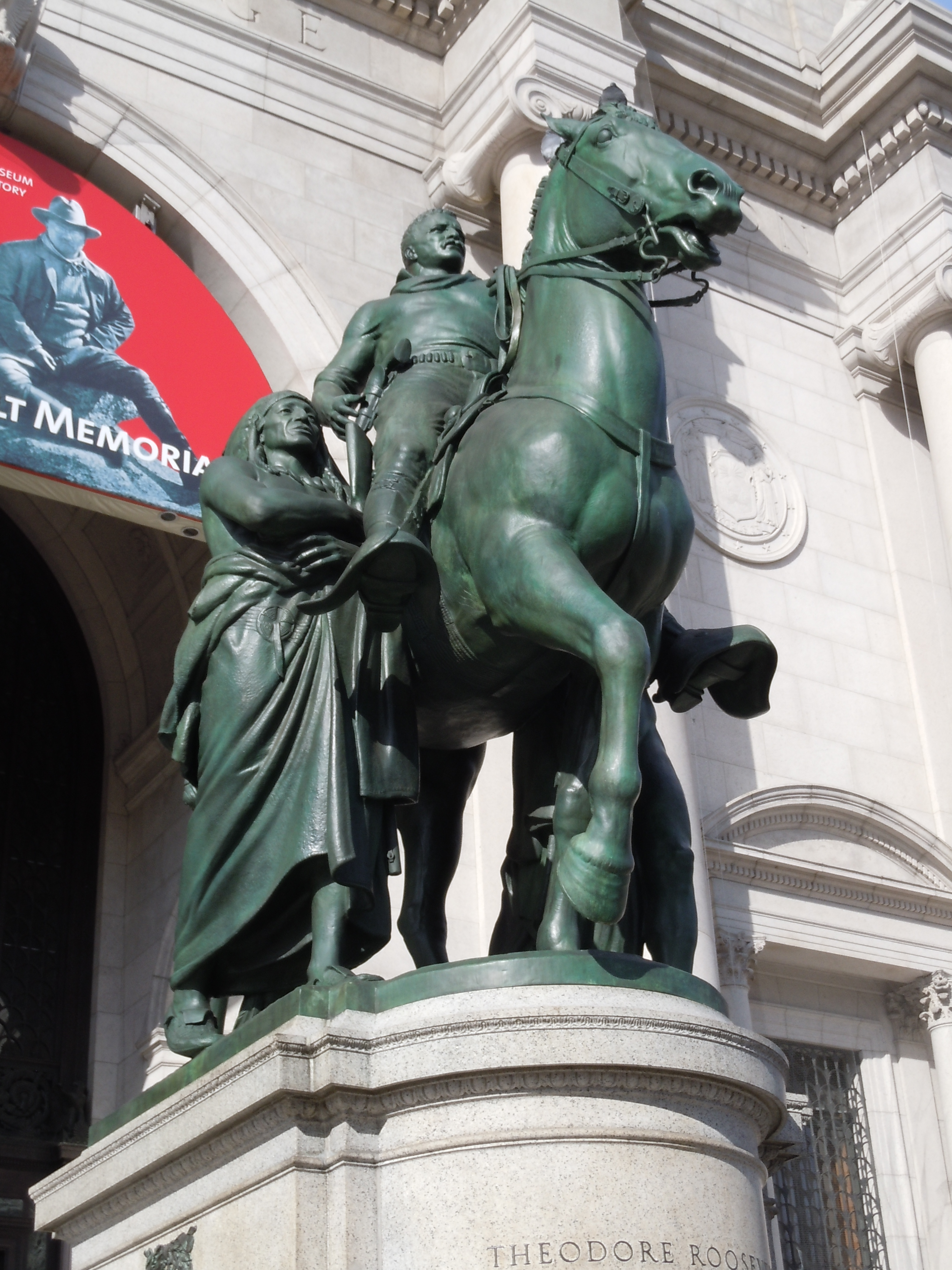
- The statue in New York in 2013
- Artist: James Earle Fraser
- Year: 1939
- Type: Bronze
- Dimensions: 300 cm × 218 cm × 450 cm (10 ft × 7 ft 2 in × 14 ft 9 in)

Equestrian Statue of Theodore Roosevelt is a 1939 bronze sculpture by James Earle Fraser. It was located on public park land at the American Museum of Natural History in New York City. The equestrian statue depicts Theodore Roosevelt on horseback. Walking on either side of him are two men, on one side a Native American and on the other, a sub-Saharan African.

The statue has provoked increasing criticism for its hierarchical implications, and there were calls to remove it beginning in 2017. On June 21, 2020, the museum announced that it was asking city officials to remove the statue. New York Mayor Bill de Blasio supported the removal, as did Roosevelt's great-grandson, Theodore Roosevelt IV, and great-great-grandson Kermit Roosevelt III. The New York City Public Design Commission voted unanimously on June 21, 2021, to relocate the statue. The statue was removed on January 20, 2022. It was decided that the statue would be relocated to the Theodore Roosevelt Presidential Library in North Dakota, though it was not specified how the statue would be displayed, with no plans immediately made to display the statute for public viewing.

== History ==
It was dedicated on October 27, 1940. Cast by Gorham Manufacturing Company, Providence, RI.

The inscription reads:
(On rear of sculpture:)
J E FRASER SC 1939
(On front of base:)
THEODORE ROOSEVELT
1858–1919
(On left side of base:)
GOVERNOR OF THE STATE OF NEW YORK
1899 1901
(On right side of base:)
PRESIDENT OF THE UNITED STATES
1901 1909 signed

== Commission ==
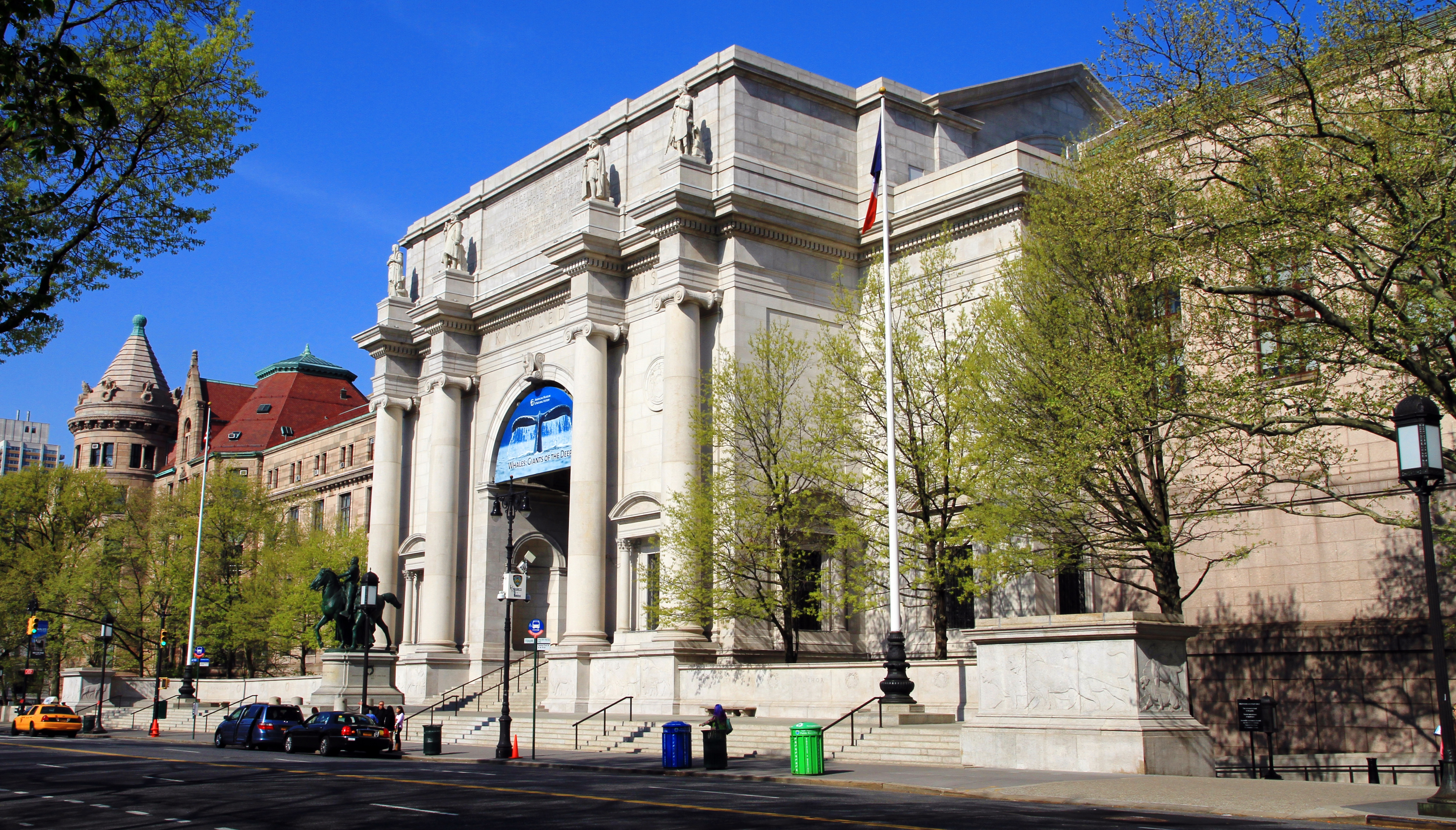
The monument as part of the neo-classical New York State Memorial to Theodore Roosevelt

The sculpture was commissioned by the Roosevelt Memorial Association in the 1930s after Fraser had delivered his design for the Arts of Peace memorial in Washington D.C., which at the time was also in competition with this memorial as the chosen location. For Arts of Peace, Fraser made a pair of statues of Pegasus depicting the themes Music and Harvest, and Aspiration and Literature.

The statue was placed at the entrance to the museum's hall of dioramas dedicated to Carl Akeley who had accompanied Roosevelt on a year-long expedition to Africa. The sculpture and its pedestal were designed for this setting, appropriate in scale and design for the neo-classical plans of Henry Bacon's architecture. An earlier monument by Fraser dedicated to Roosevelt in Cuba in 1924 was also designed with Henry Bacon, and they both attended its dedication in Cuba.

The two walking figures have been construed as representations of continents, not individuals in a narrative, and that was common practice in public sculpture, of which London's Albert Memorial is a prominent example. At the same time, the "pyramidal composition" with Roosevelt at its apex "implies a hierarchy". One analysis of the work, after examining the careers of both Roosevelt and Fraser, concludes that "Both men evidently believed in white dominance as natural order. However, Roosevelt and Fraser also had sincere, if paternalistic, admiration for indigenous cultures and a desire to preserve images and artifacts in what was, for the time, a relatively respectful manner." Many feel the statue depicts Roosevelt, an early champion of civil rights and equality for black and Native Americans during the early 20th century, as leading minority persons in the U.S. forward towards the promises made to all under the U.S. Constitution. Roosevelt's relationship with Booker T. Washington and his appointment of Minnie Cox as the first black regional postmaster in the United States (Indianola, Mississippi) is seen as further cementing this view. Roosevelt's own comments regarding race indicated that he believed all the races were equal, but some cultures were superior due to their greater technological advances over time. The sculptor of the statue, James Earle Fraser, stated the intent with these words: "The two figures at [Roosevelt's] side are guides symbolizing the continents of Africa and America, and if you choose may stand for Roosevelt's friendliness to all races."

== Controversy ==
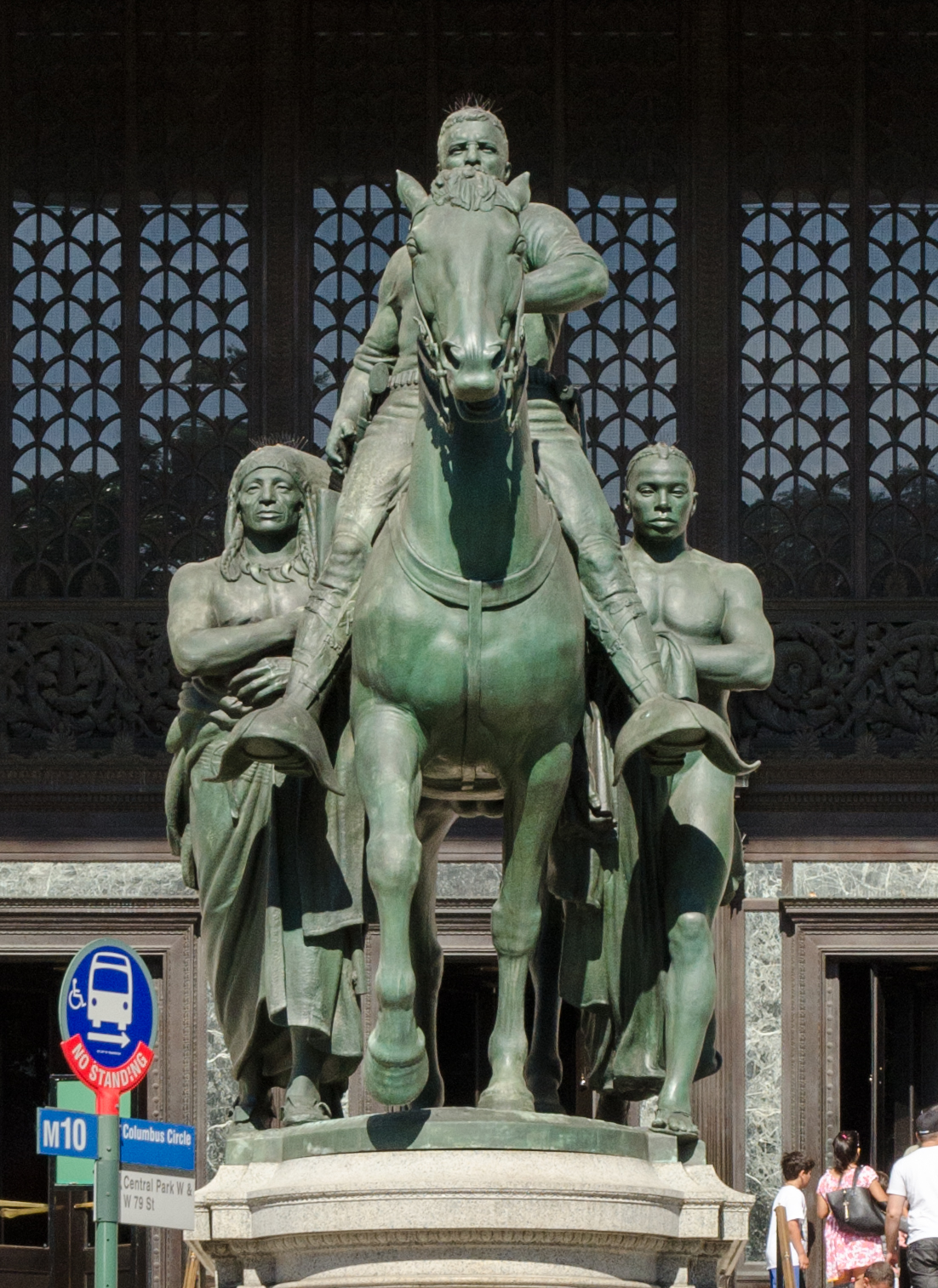
Frontal view

In 1984 the statue was the subject of criticism by the American philosopher Donna Haraway as part of a long essay criticising the role played by Roosevelt and Akeley in the museum's founding. In 1991 four life-sized photographs of the statue shown on four faces of a large cube, surrounded by sand bags and wooden police cordons as well as ticker tape and balloons. formed the installation at the Museum of Modern Art by David Hammons titled Pulic Enemy for the exhibition Dislocations. In 1999 James Loewen argued in Lies Across America that the statue was erected when the museum was openly racist, and that the arrangement of the figures is meant to advocate white supremacy.

The statue was mentioned in the April 2017 TED talk Can Art Amend History? by artist and activist Titus Kaphar, discussing the choice of pose showing that "Teddy Roosevelt is sitting there ...and on the left-hand side of him is a Native American walking and on the right-hand side of him is an African-American walking" as a representation of white social hierarchy in America. After the Unite the Right rally due to the controversial removal of an equestrian statue of Robert E. Lee, this and many other statues across America also became the focus of attempts to remove what were claimed to be glorifications of America's racist past. The base of the statue was covered with red paint on the morning of October 26, 2017. A few hours later, a group admitted guilt and claimed that the statue embodied "patriarchy, white supremacy, and settler-colonialism."

In January 2018, a commission appointed by New York City Mayor Bill de Blasio to review several statues on city property concluded that this statue was open to many interpretations and made no recommendation for action. The commission's members were divided evenly. Some citing research that the standing figures are allegorical representations of the continents and noting that these figures "are in no way abject". Others emphasized how the sculpture is experienced, "that height is power in public art", an expression of "power and dominance". The New York Times critic Holland Cotter found that decision disappointing: "It doesn't require a sensitivity to subtexts to see that the composition, no matter how you gloss it, is quite literally an emblem of white-man-on-top."

In July 2019, the Museum of Natural History mounted an exhibit devoted to the statue and contemporary interpretations called "Addressing the Statue". The presentation included many contrasting viewpoints and invited comments from visitors. David Hurst Thomas, the curator of anthropology at the museum said: "The museum is making a really explicit statement that we're big enough to stand up for our past. We're not going to cover it up. We're going to welcome dissent." The exhibit included an extensive website for further exploration of the sculpture and its interpretation. It presented comments by the sculptor and his collaborators alongside those of academics who contested what the two walking figures represent and whether Roosevelt could be described as a "racial unifier".

To provide context for those viewing the sculpture, the museum installed laminated placards at its base that said: "This statue was unveiled to the public in 1940, as part of a larger New York State memorial to former N.Y. governor and U.S. President Theodore Roosevelt. Today, some see the statue as a heroic group; others, as a symbol of racial hierarchy. You can learn more about this statue inside the Museum and [online]." An article in the Columbia Journal of Law and the Arts was critical of the placards, noting they were not visible at a distance.

== Removal ==
The world does not need statues, relics of another age, that reflect neither the values of the person they intend to honor nor the values of equality and justice. — Theodore Roosevelt IV

On June 21, 2020, the museum announced that it would remove the statue. Museum president Ellen V. Futter said the decision did not reflect a judgment about Roosevelt but was driven by the sculpture's "hierarchical composition". Her statement to Museum staff said that "many of us find its depictions of the Native American and African figures and their placement in the monument racist". Roosevelt's great-grandson, Theodore Roosevelt IV, supported the decision, saying "The world does not need statues, relics of another age, that reflect neither the values of the person they intend to honor nor the values of equality and justice." Mayor de Blasio said: "The American Museum of Natural History has asked to remove the Theodore Roosevelt statue because it explicitly depicts Black and Indigenous people as subjugated and racially inferior. The City supports the Museum's request. It is the right decision and the right time to remove this problematic statue."

On July 12, 2020, Roosevelt's great-grandson Mark Roosevelt backed efforts to remove the statue. He said: "If we wish to live in harmony and equality with people of other races, we should not maintain paternalistic statues that depict Native Americans and African Americans in subordinate roles. The statue of Theodore Roosevelt, my great-grandfather, in front of New York's Museum of Natural History, does so, and it is good that it is being taken down."

On June 21, 2021, the New York City Public Design Commission voted unanimously to remove the statue from in front of the museum and relocate it to an institution devoted to Roosevelt's life and legacy. On November 19, the Theodore Roosevelt Presidential Library Foundation announced it would accept the statue as a long-term loan from New York City for display at the Theodore Roosevelt Presidential Library, which opened in Medora, North Dakota in 2026. Theodore Roosevelt IV said: "It is fitting that the statue is being relocated to a place where its composition can be recontextualized to facilitate difficult, complex and inclusive discussions."

On January 19, 2022, the statue was removed from its location on the plaza in front of the museum. The plinth remained for some additional months, but was replaced by two plaques, one honoring Roosevelt, and one describing the reasons for the statue's removal. The statue has been sent to North Dakota and is in storage at the location where the Theodore Roosevelt Presidential Library is under construction as of 2023. Future plans for the statue remain controversial. There are no current plans to display the statue at the library.

== Gallery ==
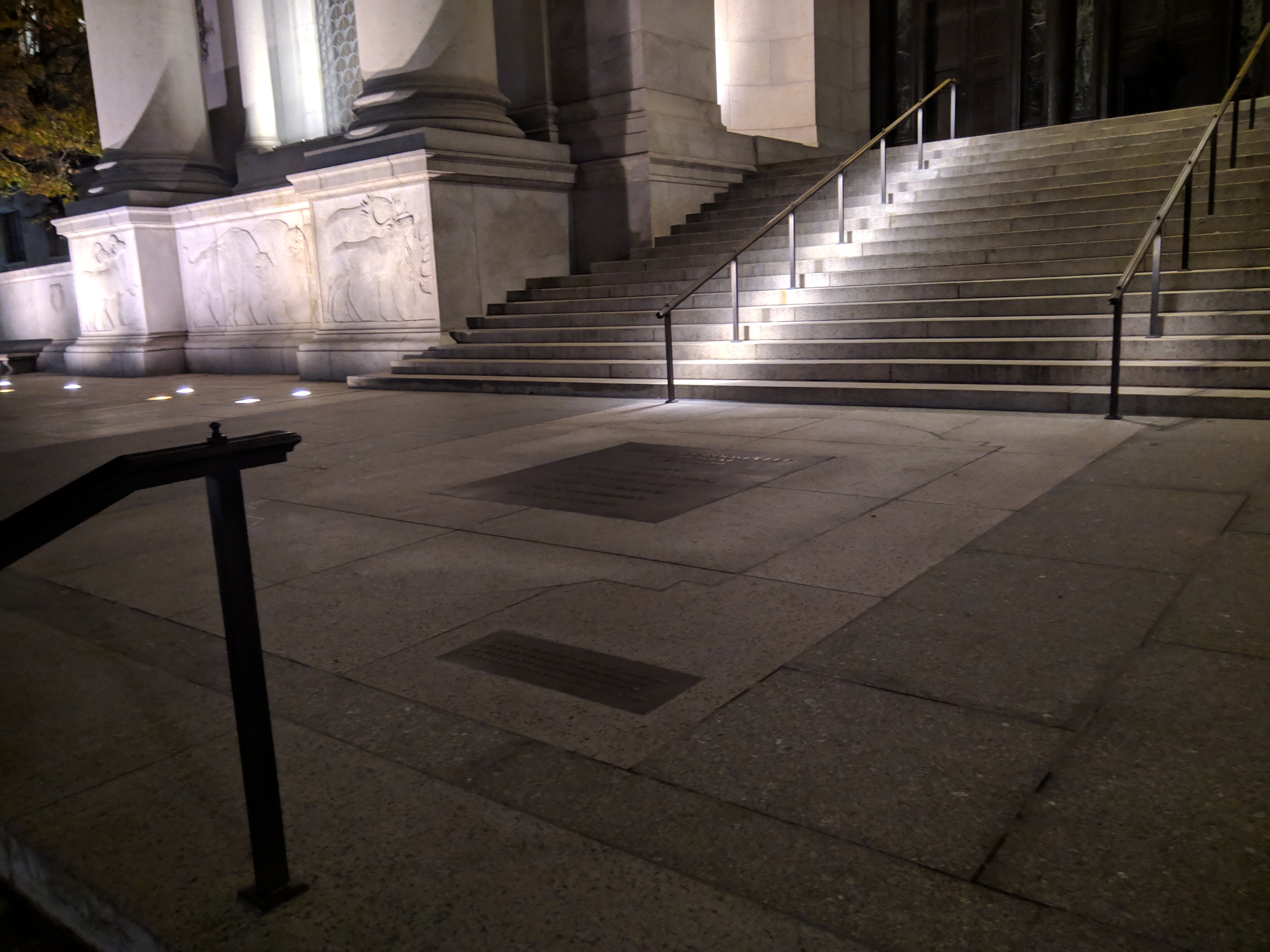
The plaza in front of the American Museum of Natural History, at night. This is the location where the Equestrian Statue of Roosevelt stood.

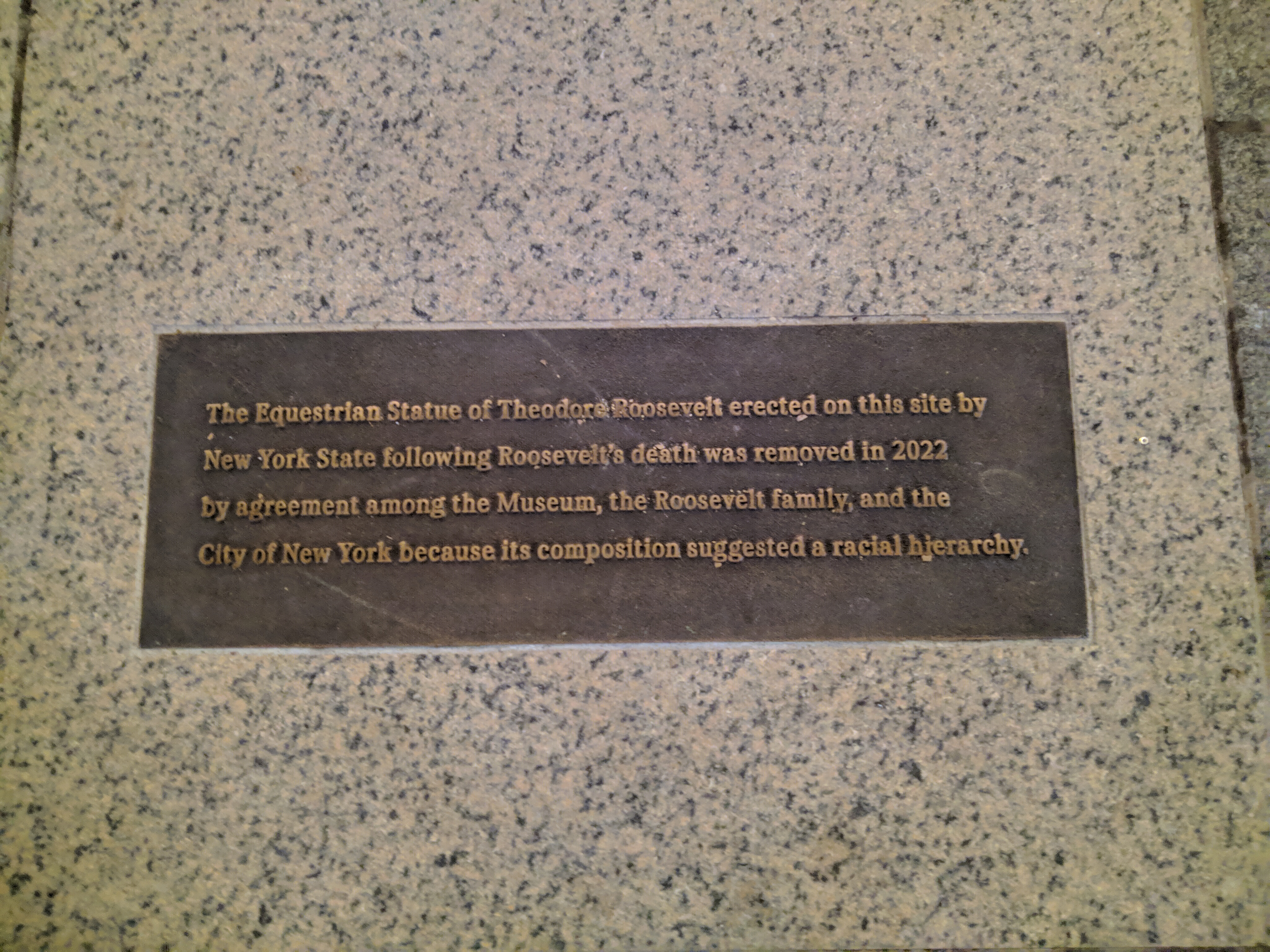
Plaque describing the reasons for the removal of the statue of Roosevelt.

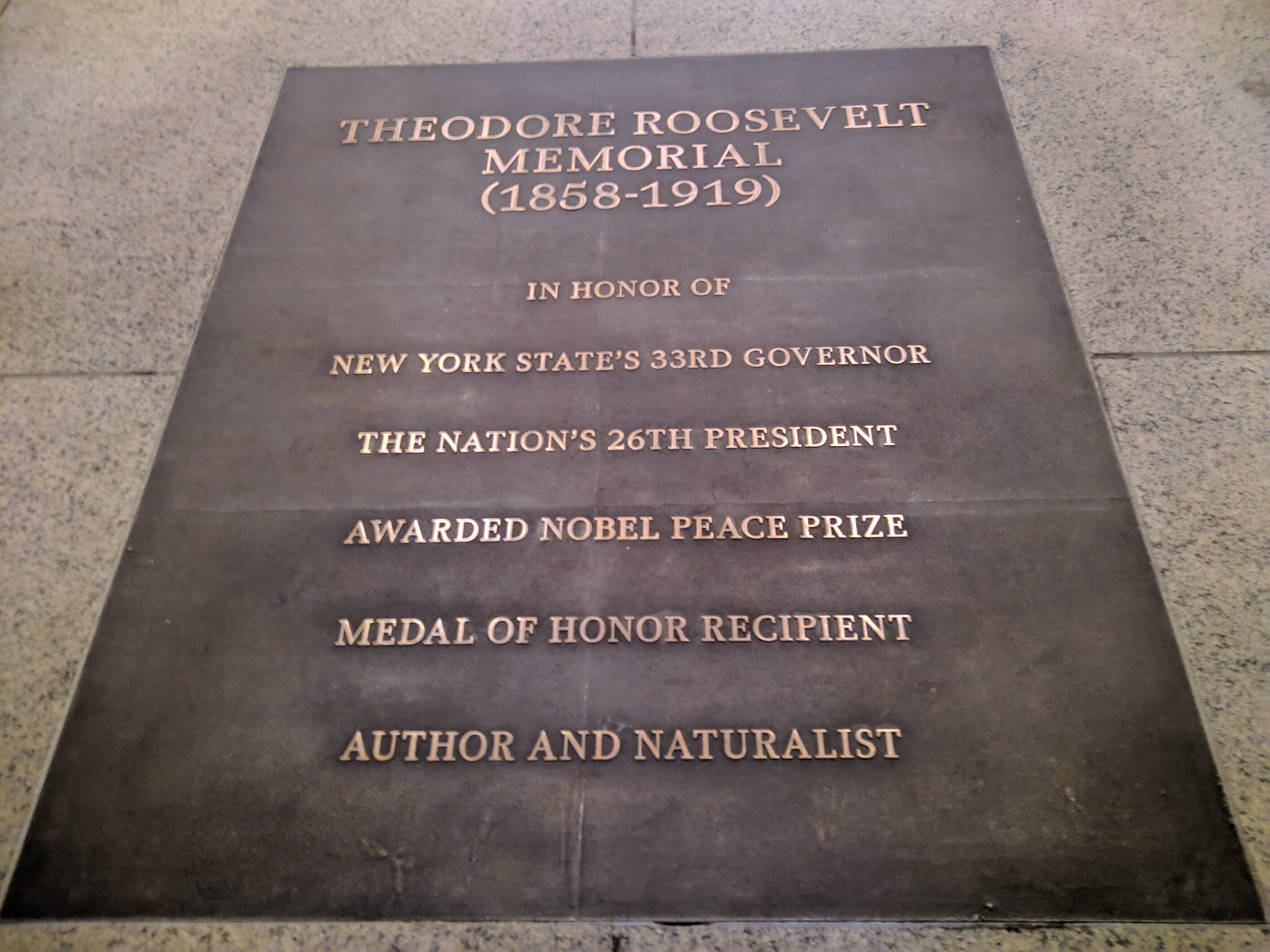
Plaque memorializing Theodore Roosevelt, at the Roosevelt Memorial in front of the American Museum of Natural History. This plaque replaced the Equestrian Statue of Theodore Roosevelt, which stood on this spot from 1940 until 2022.

== See also ==
- Allegorical sculpture
- Architectural sculpture
- List of sculptures of presidents of the United States
- Monument and memorial controversies in the United States
- Monumental sculpture
- Theodore Roosevelt, Rough Rider, 1922 equestrian statue in Portland, Oregon
