= Maah Daah Hey Trail =

Trail in North Dakota, USA

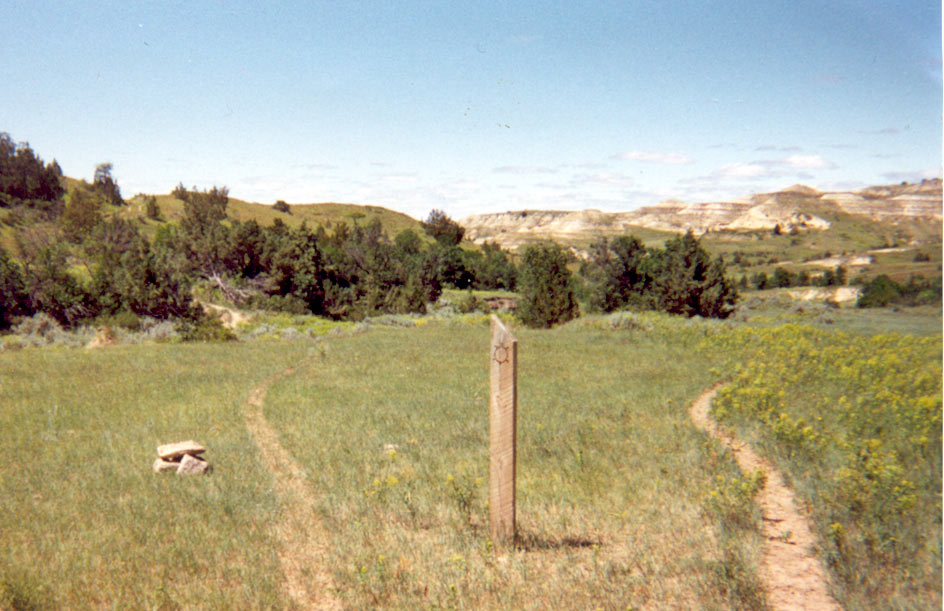
A photo from the Maah Daah Hey Trail.

The Maah Daah Hey Trail is a 144-mile (232 km) non-motorized single track trail in North Dakota, United States, that reaches from USFS Burning Coal Vein Campground 30 miles south of Medora to the USFS CCC campground 16 miles south of Watford City. The Trail winds through the Little Missouri National Grasslands in North Dakota's Badlands to form the longest continuous singletrack mountain biking trail in America. Nine fenced campgrounds are accessible by gravel surfaced roads. The campgrounds include camping spurs, potable water, hitching rails, picnic tables, fire rings and accessible toilets.

Maah Daah Hey is a phrase from the Mandan Indians meaning "an area that has been or will be around for a long time."

The trail connects both the North Unit and South Unit of Theodore Roosevelt National Park, although biking is not allowed in the parks themselves. Alternate bike trails have been constructed to bypass the parks. The entire trail is open, however, to hikers and horseback riders. There are multiple trailhead entry points which can be accessed from US 85 and country roads on the west side of the Little Missouri River.
