= Edward O'Keefe =

American media executive (born 1978)

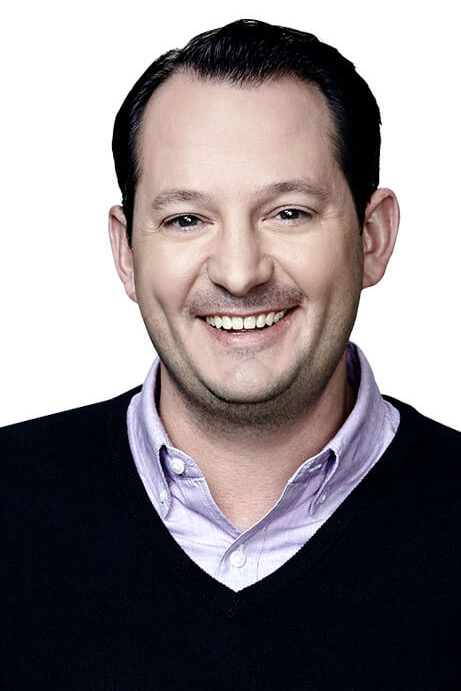
- Born: Edward Fitzpatrick O'Keefe; February 16, 1978 (age 48); Grand Forks, North Dakota, U.S.
- Education: Georgetown University (BA)
- Occupations: President and CEO
- Years active: 2026–present
- Employer: WNET
- Spouse: Allison Davis
- Children: 2
- Website: Official website WNET Biography

Edward Fitzpatrick O'Keefe (born 16 February 1978) is an American media executive serving as the chief executive officer of the Theodore Roosevelt Presidential Library Foundation and the President and CEO of The WNET Group. Prior to his current role, O'Keefe held several positions in the news industry, including at ABC News, CNN, and as the founder of the media start-up NowThis.

O'Keefe's career in media began at ABC News. Subsequently, he founded NowThis, a media company focused on delivering news and information through social media platforms. After two years at NowThis, O'Keefe transitioned to CNN, where he held leadership roles focused on strategy and growth for properties including CNN Money, CNN Politics, and Travel.

In 2019, O'Keefe was a fellow at the Harvard Kennedy School. During his fellowship, his research centered on the evolving landscape of journalism and the rise of streaming news. This work culminated in the publication of his paper "Streaming War Won". His research interests also extended to Theodore Roosevelt. Following his fellowship, O'Keefe continued to consult for news organizations and pursue his research before his appointment as CEO of the Theodore Roosevelt Presidential Library Foundation.

== Background ==
Edward F. O'Keefe was born in Grand Forks, North Dakota on February 16, 1978, to William G. and Heather C. (Holmes) O'Keefe.

He completed his secondary education at Red River High School, graduating in 1996. He then attended Georgetown University, where he studied government, psychology, and English, graduating cum laude.

O'Keefe currently resides in New York City with his wife, Allison Davis O'Keefe, a photographer, and their two children.

== Career ==
After graduating from Georgetown University in 2000, O'Keefe began his career at ABC News as a desk assistant. He later worked as a reporter and producer, covering Capitol Hill and the 2004 presidential campaign. His positions at ABC included producer for This Week with George Stephanopoulos, Senior Political Editor, Managing Editor of ABCNews.com, and Executive Producer of ABCNews.com.

O'Keefe covered the events of September 11, 2001, on Capitol Hill, reporting on Senator Joe Biden's appearance on ABC News, where Biden stated that the terrorist attacks were likely conducted by Al-Qaeda.

He covered the 2004 presidential election and spent nearly 16 months on the road with Senator John Kerry. O'Keefe reported Kerry's concession live on-air in an ABC News Special Report with Charlie Gibson.

He reported on remarks by then-Senate Majority Leader Trent Lott that contributed to his resignation. At a 100th birthday party for Senator Strom Thurmond, Lott remarked that if Thurmond, who ran on a segregationist platform in 1948, had won, “we wouldn't have had all these problems all these years.” O'Keefe's story for ABCNews.com became the subject of a Harvard University study titled "Big Media Meets the Bloggers: Coverage of Trent Lott's Remarks at Strom Thurmond's Birthday Party."

Following the 2004 election, O'Keefe covered the Senate confirmation hearings of Chief Justice John Roberts and Justice Samuel Alito to the Supreme Court alongside George Stephanopoulos. He later worked on This Week, where he interviewed individuals including George Clooney, Nora Ephron, Stephen Colbert, Sigourney Weaver, and John Updike.

As Executive Producer, O'Keefe was involved in the editorial direction of ABCNews.com and a partnership between Yahoo! and ABC News.

After working at ABC for 12 years, O'Keefe became the founding editor-in-chief of the media start-up NowThis in 2012.

After two years at NowThis, O'Keefe joined CNN as VP of CNNMoney and CNN Politics. In 2016, he became the SVP of Premium Content, overseeing strategy for several CNN divisions. In 2018, he became the SVP of Content Development, overseeing CNN's digital and emerging platforms, including mobile, social, video, podcasts, and subscription services. Initiatives during this time included The Axe Files with David Axelrod and the podcast Election 2000: Over/Time. O'Keefe was also involved in the development of ExplorePartsUnknown.com, the digital component to the Parts Unknown series with Anthony Bourdain.

In January 2019, the Shorenstein Center on Media, Politics and Public Policy at the Harvard Kennedy School announced its Spring 2019 class of fellows, including Adam Serwer, Maria Hinojosa, and O'Keefe. At Harvard, O'Keefe published research on news streaming in his paper “Streaming War Won” and conducted research on Theodore Roosevelt, examining unpublished letters, correspondence, and written records, particularly originating during Roosevelt's time in North Dakota. O'Keefe's research culminated in his book, The Loves of Theodore Roosevelt, published in May 2024.

On July 23, 2026, the WNET Group's Board of Trustees appointed O'Keefe to become the President and CEO of The WNET Group, a public media organization that operates PBS Stations WNET and WLIW TV and WLIW-FM, an NPR Radio Station. He assumed the role on September 21, 2026 succeeding Neal Shapiro.

== Awards and recognition ==
O'Keefe was an Executive Producer of Explore Parts Unknown, which received a Primetime Emmy for Outstanding Short Form Nonfiction or Reality Series in 2018.

He also received the Edward R. Murrow Award for Social Media (2017) and two Webby Awards for Anthony Bourdain: Explore Parts Unknown and 2016 Election, #MyVote.

He was a recipient of the George Foster Peabody Award awarded to ABC News for coverage of the September 11 attacks.
