= Elkhorn (TV series) =

2024 American TV drama series

- Genre: History; Western
- Created by: Craig Miller
- Inspired by: Theodore Roosevelt
- Written by: Josh Flanagan; Will Ilgen; Andy Gosche
- Starring: Mason Beals; Jeff DuJardin; Elijha Mahar; Garrett Schulte; Ashton Solecki; Tori Griffith; Matt Wiggins; Sam Schweikert; Nate Timmerman; Travis Lee Eller
- Country of origin: United States
- No. of seasons: 2
- No. of episodes: 18

Production
- Producers: Gary Tarpinian; Paninee Theeranuntawat
- Running time: 43 minutes

Original release
- Network: INSP
- Release: April 11, 2024 – November 20, 2025

Elkhorn is an American television drama series, chronicling the early life of Theodore Roosevelt, the 26th President of the United States. Roosevelt became a cowboy and rancher in the American Frontier in his mid-20s, before returning east to become the country's youngest President.

The first season of Elkhorn aired on INSP in spring 2024. It was renewed for a second season, which premiered October 2, 2025.

== Premise ==
Theodore Roosevelt was born into a wealthy New York family, and had a prominent political career in the New York State Legislature in the early 1880s. On Valentine's Day 1884, he suffered a pair of unimaginable personal tragedies, with both his wife and mother dying on the same day. He impulsively quit his role in politics in New York moving to the Wild West, the Dakota Territory.

Many historians have discussed the reasoning for this decision. His love for the American frontier was well documented, and the "beef bonanza" sweeping America at the time. Some believe he was running away from his problems and/or to mourn and piece his life back together. Roosevelt’s family and friends tried to stop him leaving for the Badlands, as they believed it would destroy his political career.

It follows the day-to-day trials and tribulations of Roosevelt as he encounters thieves, hired guns, native wildlife, along with the need for law and order in the Badlands. Roosevelt was an upper class man, who had few interactions with people outside his bubble in New York, other than his servants. The Badlands thrust him into everyday life and he quickly learned how to relate to the "common man". His time in The Dakota Territory shaped him into the man that went on to lead the Rough Riders to victory many years later.

The series tells the story of how he became known as "The Cowboy President" and the establishment of Elkhorn Ranch. It is the first time on television Roosevelt's story has been told in a scripted genre format.

== Release ==
Filming for the first season of Elkhorn was announced in 2023. The first episode aired on April 11, 2024, on INSP, with the season finale airing in June 2024.

Following a successful first season, Elkhorn was renewed by INSP for a second season to air in 2025. The first episode of the second season is due to air October 2, 2025 and the season will contain eight episodes. The season finale in expected to air on November 20, 2025.

== Reception ==
=== Critical response ===
Following the completion of season 1, some media critics have suggested Elkhorn is the lesser known series in a batch of quality western series airing in the United States, drawing comparisons with Yellowstone and Landman. In the publication collider, the TV critic Michael John Petty stated "if you love Taylor Sheridan's Westerns (Yellowstone creator), this gripping drama series about America's cowboy President is a must-watch."

=== Accolades ===
Year	Award ceremony	Category	Nominee	Result	Ref.
2025	8th Annual Cowboys & Indians Awards	Best Actor in a TV Series	Mason Beals	Won	
2025	8th Annual Cowboys & Indians Awards	Best TV Series	Elkhorn	Won	

== Episodes ==
Season	Episodes	Originally released	
Season	Episodes	First released	Last released
1	10	April 11, 2024	June 13, 2024
2	8	October 2, 2025	November 20, 2025

=== Season 1 ===
No. overall	No. in season	Title	Original release date
1	1	"The Greenhorn"	April 11, 2024
After suffering loss while living in New York, Roosevelt abandons his life in pursuit of Dakota, and the Elkhorn Ranch is born.
2	2	"The Frenchman"	April 18, 2024
Following the completion of the Elkhorn Ranch, a land owner threatens to commit an underhanded land grab. Marquis de Morès and Roosevelt square off over the land.
3	3	"Rustlers"	April 25, 2024
Roosevelt's men face an allegation of rustling cattle from a neighboring ranches. His reputation suffers and to save it he must find the real culprit and return the stolen livestock.
4	4	"The Stranglers"	May 2, 2024
The Elkhorn Ranch experiences a theft, with Theodore Roosevelt's new horses going missing. He learns quickly that Frontier justice isn't always fair after tracking down the lone criminal.
5	5	"Desperate Measures"	May 9, 2024
The Roosevelt cattle operation is finally up and running on the Elkhorn Ranch, but Roosevelt health deteriorates and his ranch manager must step up to try and save him.
6	6	"On The Hunt"	May 16, 2024
Theodore Roosevelt decides its time for a hunting expedition in the Bighorn Mountains, to take is mind off the tasks at the ranch. The trip takes a bad turn when he stumbles across a grizzly bear.
7	7	"Bandits"	May 23, 2024
A stagecoach is terrorized by a masked bandit, killing a passenger. Helping the citizens of Medora, Theodore Roosevelt helps track down the culprit and attempts to trap him.
8	8	"Crossroads"	May 30, 2024
A wildfire hits the ranch, meaning Theodore Roosevelt has to sell livestock in order to survive. He also stands strong and refuses to accept a low offer for the ranch following the fire.
9	9	"The Roundup"	June 6, 2024
As Theodore Roosevelt and his band of men head for the open range for their first roundup, tensions begin to show after the truth is revealed about the intentions of others.
10	10	"A Man for All Seasons"	June 13, 2024
Roosevelt has to act quickly after a lightning strike spooks a herd and nearly causes a stampede. Tensions arise as he plans to return to New York.

=== Season 2 ===
No. overall	No. in season	Title	Original release date
11	1	"A Fine Welcome"	October 2, 2025
Roosevelt returns to the Badlands, where the Marquis de Morès grazes cattle on Elkhorn land, sparking a violent range war.
12	2	"Secrets in the Wind"	October 9, 2025
Roosevelt’s ranch faces danger when a stranger from Chicago investigates a missing associate, threatening both Elkhorn and the Marquis.
13	3	"Under Suspicion"	October 16, 2025
While Roosevelt helps catch a horse thief, Medora erupts after the Marquis de Morès is arrested for murdering a rancher.
14	4	"By the Horns"	October 23, 2025
Believing Roosevelt caused his arrest, the Marquis challenges him to a duel as rivals sabotage his refrigerated train car.
15	5	"Trials and Tribulations"	October 30, 2025
Roosevelt attends the Marquis’ murder trial, while Medora’s father urges her to abandon her husband and his violent ways.
16	6	"Black Jack"	November 6, 2025
Roosevelt aids a Sioux brave in finding stolen horses, while the Marquis struggles to repair his damaged reputation.
17	7	"Home to Roost"	November 13, 2025
Chicago enforcers confront Medora’s cattlemen, clashing with the Marquis, while an Elkhorn man rides to Montana seeking help.
18	8	"War"	November 20, 2025
When a Chicago cattle baron invades with gunslingers, Roosevelt and the Marquis unite to defend Medora from destruction.

== See also ==
- Maltese Cross Cabin, Medora, North Dakota
