= Theodore Roosevelt National Park =

National park in North Dakota, United States

- IUCN category II (national park)
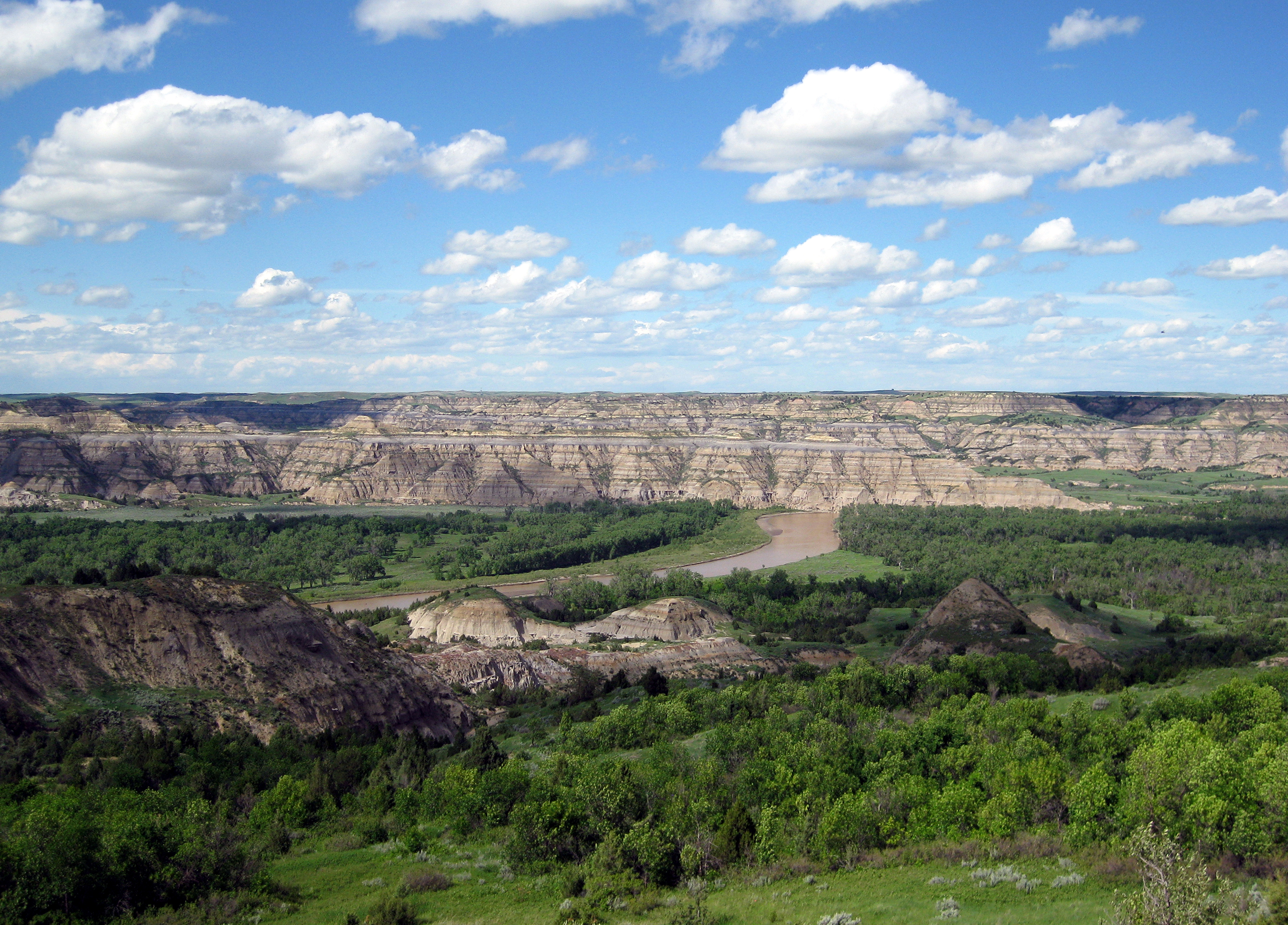
- View of the badlands and the Little Missouri River

- Location within the United States Location within North Dakota
- Interactive map of Theodore Roosevelt National Park
- Location: Billings and McKenzie counties, North Dakota, United States
- Nearest city: Medora (South Unit), Watford City (North Unit)
- Coordinates: 46°58′N 103°27′W
- Area: 70,446 acres (285.08 km^{2})
- Established: November 10, 1978; 47 years ago
- Visitors: 668,679 (in 2022)
- Governing body: National Park Service
- Website: Theodore Roosevelt National Park

Theodore Roosevelt National Park is a national park of the United States in the badlands of western North Dakota. Comprising three geographically separated areas and the only American national park named after a single person, it pays homage to the time that President Theodore Roosevelt spent in the surrounding area and in the Dakota Territories before they were states. Roosevelt lived in the area after his mother and wife died hours apart on February 14, 1884.

The park covers 70,446 acres (110.1 sq mi; 285.1 km^{2}) of land in three sections: the North Unit, the South Unit, and the Elkhorn Ranch Unit. The Little Missouri River flows through all three units, which are connected by the Maah Daah Hey Trail. The larger South Unit lies alongside Interstate 94 near Medora; the smaller North Unit is situated along U.S. Route 85, about eighty miles (130 km) north of the South Unit, and Roosevelt's Elkhorn Ranch is located in between.

Both main units of the park have scenic drives, with approximately 100 miles (160 km) of foot and horse trails, wildlife viewing, and back country hiking and camping. The park received 850,000 recreational visitors in 2021.

== History ==
=== Roosevelt connection ===
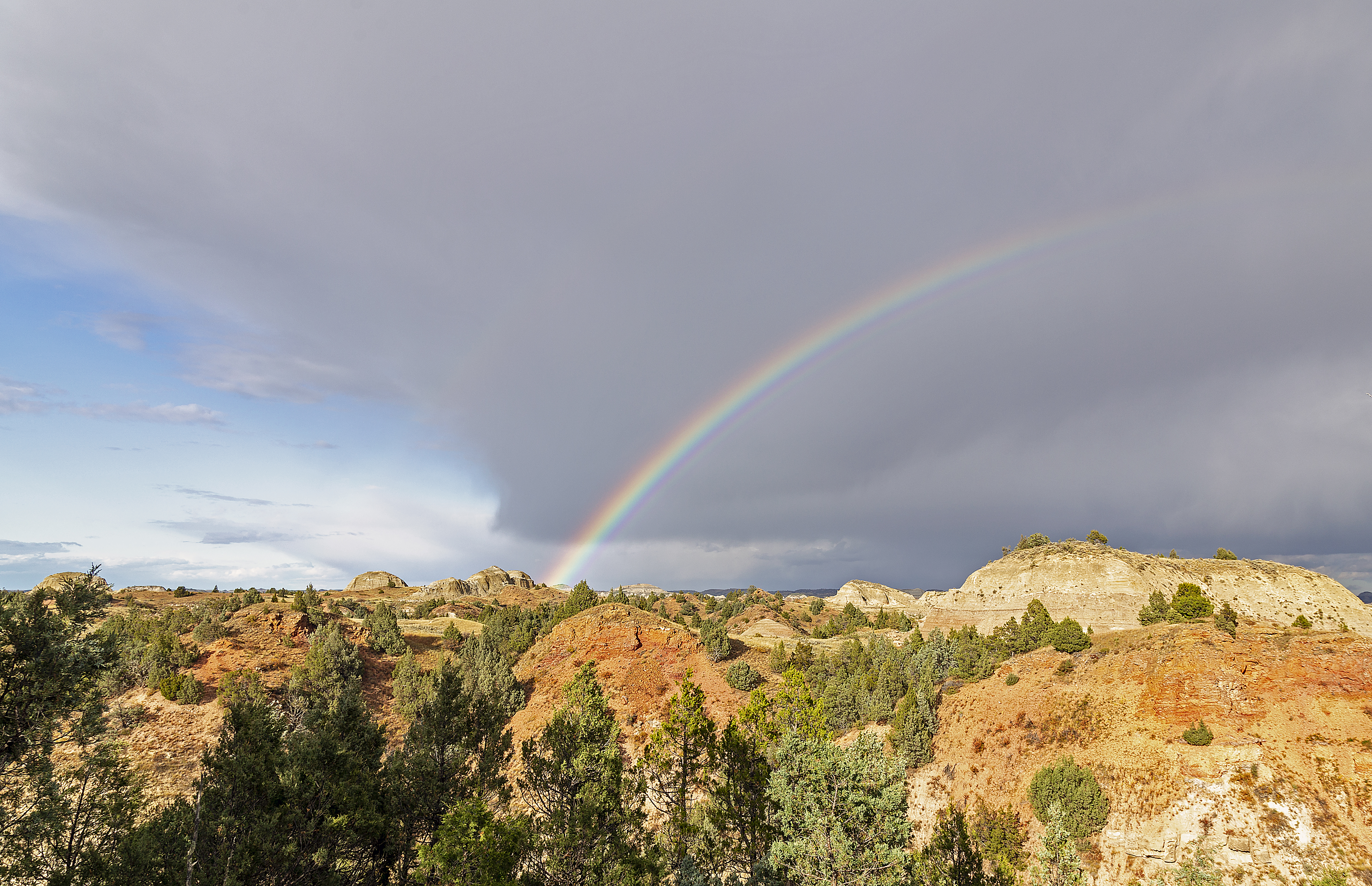
Rainbow over the badlands

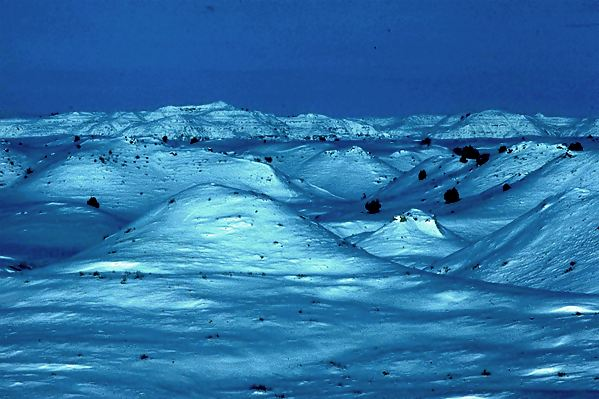
The badlands in winter

Roosevelt first came to the North Dakota badlands to hunt bison in September 1883. During that first short trip, he got his bison and fell in love with the rugged lifestyle and the "perfect freedom" of the West. He invested $14,000 in the Maltese Cross Ranch, which was already being managed by Sylvane Ferris and Bill Merrifield, seven miles (11 km) south of Medora. That winter, Ferris and Merrifield built the Maltese Cross Cabin.

After the death of both his wife and his mother on February 14, 1884, Roosevelt returned to his North Dakota ranch seeking solitude and time to heal. That summer, he started his second ranch, the Elkhorn Ranch, 35 miles (56 km) north of Medora, which he hired two Maine woodsmen, Bill Sewall and Wilmot Dow, to operate. Roosevelt took great interest in his ranches and in hunting in the West, detailing his experiences in pieces published in eastern newspapers and magazines. He wrote three major works on his life in the West: Ranch Life and the Hunting Trail, Hunting Trips of a Ranchman and The Wilderness Hunter. His adventures in "the strenuous life" outdoors and the loss of his cattle in the starvation winter in 1886–1887 were influential in his pursuit of conservation policies as President of the United States (1901–1909).

=== Park development ===
Following Roosevelt's death in 1919, the Little Missouri Badlands were explored to determine possible park sites. Civilian Conservation Corps camps were established in both of the future park units from 1934 to 1941, and they developed roads and other structures in use today. The area was designated the Roosevelt Recreation Demonstration Area in 1935. In 1946 it was transferred to the United States Fish and Wildlife Service as the Theodore Roosevelt National Wildlife Refuge. After a five-year campaign by North Dakota representative William Lemke, President Truman established the South Unit of Theodore Roosevelt National Memorial Park on April 25, 1947, the only National Memorial Park ever established; the North Unit was added by act of Congress in June 1948. In 1978, in addition to boundary adjustments and the establishment of 29,920 acres (121.1 km^{2}) of the Theodore Roosevelt Wilderness, the park's designation was changed to Theodore Roosevelt National Park.

== Geography ==
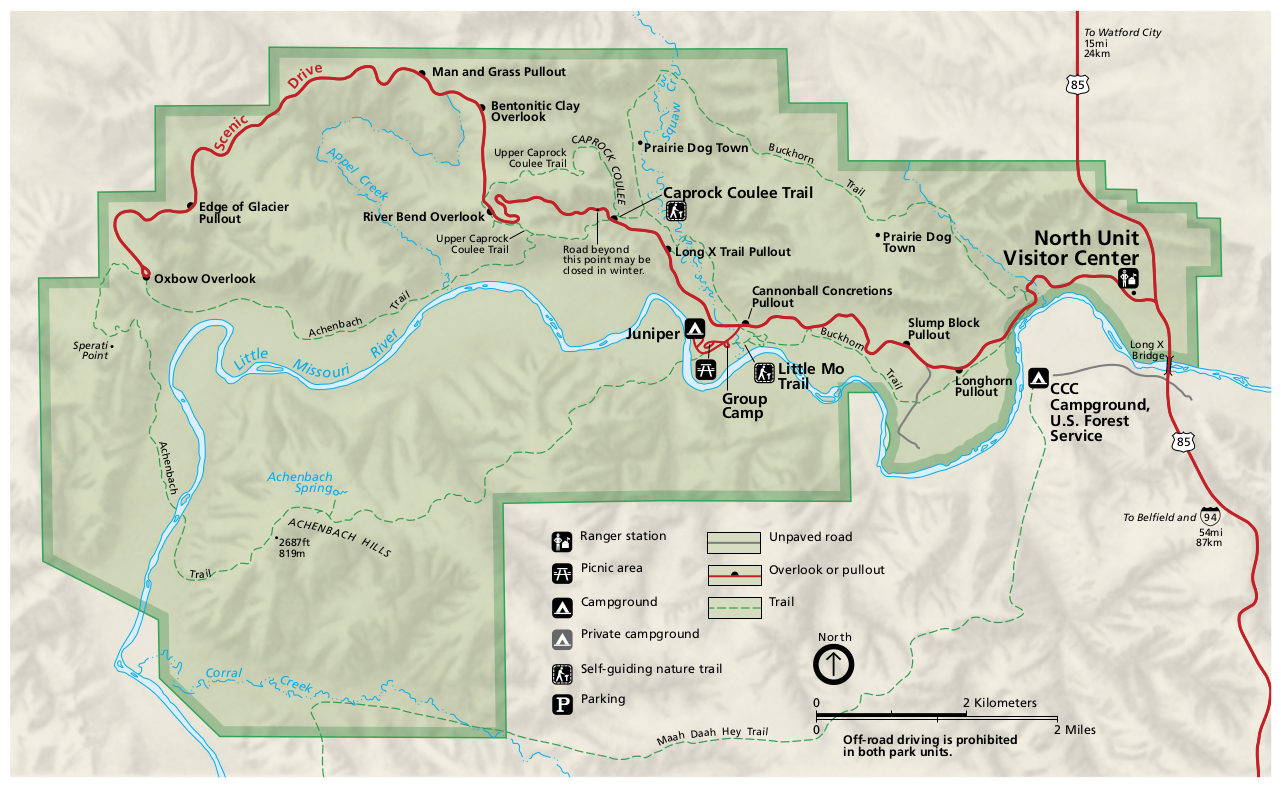
North Unit map

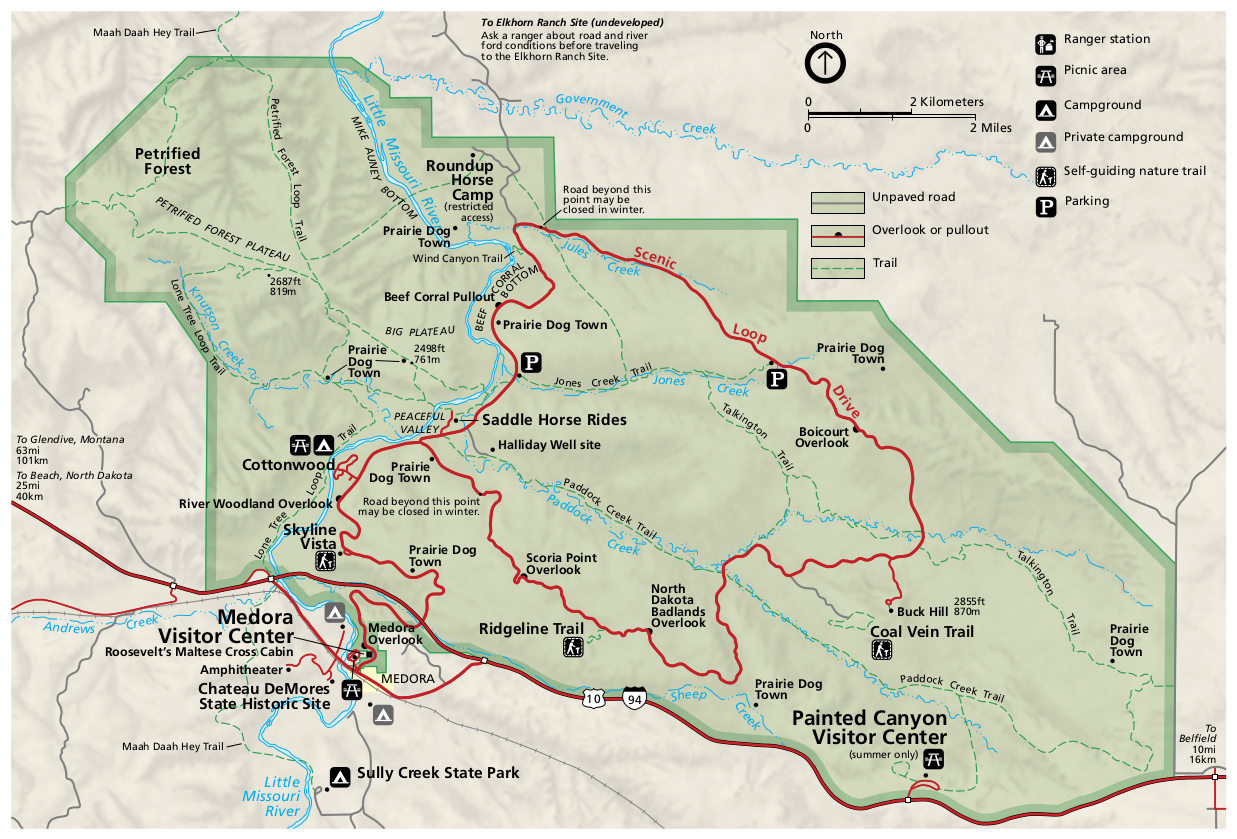
South Unit map

The North Unit, the South Unit, and the Elkhorn Ranch Unit cover a total of 70,446 acres (110.1 sq mi; 285.1 km^{2}). The park's larger South Unit lies alongside Interstate 94 near Medora. The smaller North Unit is situated about 80 miles (130 km) north of the South Unit, on U.S. Route 85, just south of Watford City. Roosevelt's Elkhorn Ranch is located between the North and South units, approximately twenty miles (32 km) west of US 85 and Fairfield.

=== Climate ===
According to the Köppen climate classification system, Theodore Roosevelt National Park has a Cold semi-arid climate (BSk). According to the United States Department of Agriculture, the Plant Hardiness zone at the North Unit Visitor Center (2008 ft / 612 m) is 3b with an average annual extreme minimum temperature of -30.6 °F (-34.8 °C), and 4a with an average annual extreme minimum temperature of -29.3 °F (-34.1 °C) at the South Unit Visitor Center (2261 ft / 689 m).

Climate data for North Unit Visitor Center, Theodore Roosevelt National Park. Elev: 2198 ft (670 m)
Month	Jan	Feb	Mar	Apr	May	Jun	Jul	Aug	Sep	Oct	Nov	Dec	Year
Mean daily maximum °F (°C)	25.2 (−3.8)	30.7 (−0.7)	41.9 (5.5)	57.9 (14.4)	68.4 (20.2)	77.1 (25.1)	85.2 (29.6)	85.0 (29.4)	73.3 (22.9)	58.1 (14.5)	40.3 (4.6)	27.9 (−2.3)	56.0 (13.3)
Daily mean °F (°C)	14.6 (−9.7)	19.8 (−6.8)	30.5 (−0.8)	43.9 (6.6)	54.6 (12.6)	63.6 (17.6)	70.4 (21.3)	69.5 (20.8)	58.3 (14.6)	44.7 (7.1)	29.7 (−1.3)	17.5 (−8.1)	43.2 (6.2)
Mean daily minimum °F (°C)	4.0 (−15.6)	8.8 (−12.9)	19.0 (−7.2)	29.9 (−1.2)	40.8 (4.9)	50.1 (10.1)	55.6 (13.1)	54.0 (12.2)	43.2 (6.2)	31.3 (−0.4)	19.1 (−7.2)	7.1 (−13.8)	30.3 (−0.9)
Average precipitation inches (mm)	0.39 (9.9)	0.30 (7.6)	0.63 (16)	1.03 (26)	2.17 (55)	3.04 (77)	2.37 (60)	1.68 (43)	1.40 (36)	1.37 (35)	0.48 (12)	0.41 (10)	15.27 (388)
Average relative humidity (%)	74.6	73.2	65.7	52.4	53.0	57.9	54.9	50.7	51.9	57.5	68.2	75.9	61.3
Average dew point °F (°C)	1.6 (−16.9)	5.4 (−14.8)	15.0 (−9.4)	25.7 (−3.5)	38.4 (3.6)	50.8 (10.4)	56.6 (13.7)	55.7 (13.2)	47.5 (8.6)	34.4 (1.3)	21.7 (−5.7)	7.7 (−13.5)	30.2 (−1.0)
Source: PRISM Climate Group

Climate data for South Unit Visitor Center, Theodore Roosevelt National Park. Elev: 2382 ft (726 m)
Month	Jan	Feb	Mar	Apr	May	Jun	Jul	Aug	Sep	Oct	Nov	Dec	Year
Mean daily maximum °F (°C)	28.0 (−2.2)	32.7 (0.4)	43.3 (6.3)	57.5 (14.2)	68.0 (20.0)	77.4 (25.2)	85.5 (29.7)	85.7 (29.8)	73.8 (23.2)	58.8 (14.9)	41.8 (5.4)	30.1 (−1.1)	57.0 (13.9)
Daily mean °F (°C)	16.9 (−8.4)	21.2 (−6.0)	31.3 (−0.4)	43.6 (6.4)	54.4 (12.4)	63.7 (17.6)	70.5 (21.4)	69.8 (21.0)	58.4 (14.7)	45.0 (7.2)	30.7 (−0.7)	18.9 (−7.3)	43.8 (6.6)
Mean daily minimum °F (°C)	5.8 (−14.6)	9.7 (−12.4)	19.3 (−7.1)	29.8 (−1.2)	40.7 (4.8)	50.1 (10.1)	55.6 (13.1)	53.9 (12.2)	43.0 (6.1)	31.2 (−0.4)	19.6 (−6.9)	7.7 (−13.5)	30.6 (−0.8)
Average precipitation inches (mm)	0.31 (7.9)	0.31 (7.9)	0.67 (17)	1.15 (29)	2.15 (55)	2.81 (71)	2.27 (58)	1.34 (34)	1.32 (34)	1.14 (29)	0.50 (13)	0.31 (7.9)	14.28 (363)
Average relative humidity (%)	71.6	70.8	64.2	53.0	53.8	57.9	54.1	50.1	51.3	56.8	66.0	72.8	60.2
Average dew point °F (°C)	9.3 (−12.6)	13.2 (−10.4)	20.6 (−6.3)	27.6 (−2.4)	38.0 (3.3)	48.6 (9.2)	53.1 (11.7)	50.4 (10.2)	40.5 (4.7)	30.6 (−0.8)	20.7 (−6.3)	11.6 (−11.3)	30.4 (−0.9)
Source: PRISM Climate Group

== Geomorphology ==
The units of Theodore Roosevelt National Park lie within the Little Missouri Badlands. These badlands occupies a belt that is 15–40 km (9.3–24.9 mi) wide and extends along a 300 km (190 mi) stretch of the lower Little Missouri River. Such badlands are the result of active erosion by surface runoff facilitated by a combination of: 1 steep local topography; 2 weakly cemented, poorly indurated, readily eroded bedrock; and 3 a semi-arid climate. The semiarid climate of the Little Missouri Badlands greatly encourages erosion by surface runoff by supporting only sparsely vegetated hillslopes, yet delivers concentrated precipitation from relatively high-magnitude, short-lived convective storms. The rainstorms, steep hillslopes and smectitic and bentonitic, clayey bedrock also promote active landslides. The erosional landforms found in the Little Missouri Badlands and Theodore Roosevelt National Park include finely rilled hillslopes, erosional (soil) pipes, gullies, erosional pedestals, and hoodoos. Depositional and transportational landforms typical of semiarid climates, such as pediments, alluvial fans, and terraces, also occur in the Little Missouri Badlands and Theodore Roosevelt National Park.

== Geology ==
Sedimentary strata of the Paleocene Fort Union Group underlie badlands of Theodore Roosevelt National Park and adjacent area. Within this national park and adjacent area, the Fort Union Group consists of intercalated sandstone, mudstone, shale, bentonite, lignite, and clinker. These strata are subdivided in ascending order into the Bullion Creek and the Sentinel Butte formations. In the South Unit, both the Bullion Creek and the Sentinel Butte formations outcrop. Only the Sentinel Butte Formation outcrops in the North Unit because their contact plunges beneath the ground surface just south of the North Unit, between Bennett and Corral Creeks. A veneer of sand and gravel of an indeterminate late Neogene or Quaternary age locally overlies the Fort Union Group in ridge crests and hill summits. Many ridge crests and hill summits are capped by Holocene loess. North of the Little Missouri River in the North Unit, scattered glacial erratics occur on the eroded surface of either the Paleocene strata or younger sands and gravels and are buried by Holocene loess where it is present.

The Bullion Formation outcrops only in the South Unit. It consists of up to 180 m (590 ft) of lignite-bearing, poorly lithified, bright yellowish brown siltstone, claystone, and cross-stratified sandstone. Throughout most of southwestern North Dakota, the contact between the Bullion Creek and Sentinel Butte formations is a layer of carbonaceous sediments, known as the HT Butte Lignite. These carbonaceous sediments consist of lignite, lignitic shale, or both, ranging from several centimeters to several meters thick. These sedimentary strata were deposited in terrestrial, fluvial, lacustrine, and paludal environments. Underground coal fires have sporadically burned, the last in Buck Hill burn of 1951 to 1977, most of the HT Butte Lignite to form a continuous, erosion-resistant, layer of rock, known as clinker, within the South Unit. Steep, narrow gullies, erosional pipes, and rill erosion are uncommon in outcrops of the Bullion Creek Formation. Within this national park, the Bullion Creek Formation has yielded fossils of plants ("Cercidiphyllum sp." and indeterminate petrified wood and plant material); invertebrates (freshwater bivalves, gastropods, and ostracods); vertebrates (freshwater bowfin, gar, turtle, the choristodere "Champsosaurus sp.", and the crocodilian "Borealosuchus sp."); and trace fossils (worm burrows and coprolites). Unlike the overlying Sentinel Butte Formation, petrified wood is uncommon in the Bullion Creek Formation.

The Sentinel Butte Formation outcrops in both the North and South units. It consists mainly of gray to brown siltstone, claystone, sandstone, and lignite. Steep, narrow gullies, erosional pipes, and rill erosion are typical features of outcrops of the Sentinel Butte Formation. In the North Unit, 230 m (750 ft) of the Sentinel Butte Formation outcrop with only its upper layers missing due to erosion and its lower contact concealed in the subsurface along with a prominent, thick, laterally persistent, cross-stratified, basal sandstone that lies near its base. In the South Unit, isolated, well-cemented, cannonball and log-shaped concretions weather out of the basal sandstone. Many of these concretion cap hoodoos or erosional pedestals. Also, present within the Sentinel Butte Formation are prominent, 8 m (26 ft) thick Sentinel Butte tuff/bentonite bed and distinctive 4.5 to 9 m (15 to 30 ft) thick upper and lower yellow beds. The upper and lower yellow beds are carbonate-rich marker beds composed of light yellowish brown, ripple cross-stratified siltstones. These strata accumulated in terrestrial, fluvial, lacustrine, and paludal environments. Within the North and South units, two, sometimes only one, petrified wood beds outcrop within the Sentinel Butte Formation. These petrified wood beds contain abundant petrified wood, including numerous in situ petrified stumps that comprise the petrified forests found in Theodore Roosevelt National Park. Within Theodore Roosevelt National Park, the Sentinel Butte Formation has yielded numerous fossils of ferns, conifers, and angiosperms in addition to the petrified wood and stumps. This formation also has yielded numerous fossils of freshwater bivalves and gastropods, undetermined beetles and ostracods, freshwater fish, salamanders, turtles, choristoderes, alligatoroids and crocodilians, a bird, numerous mammals, and trace fossils represented by worm burrows and a bird track.

== Ecology ==
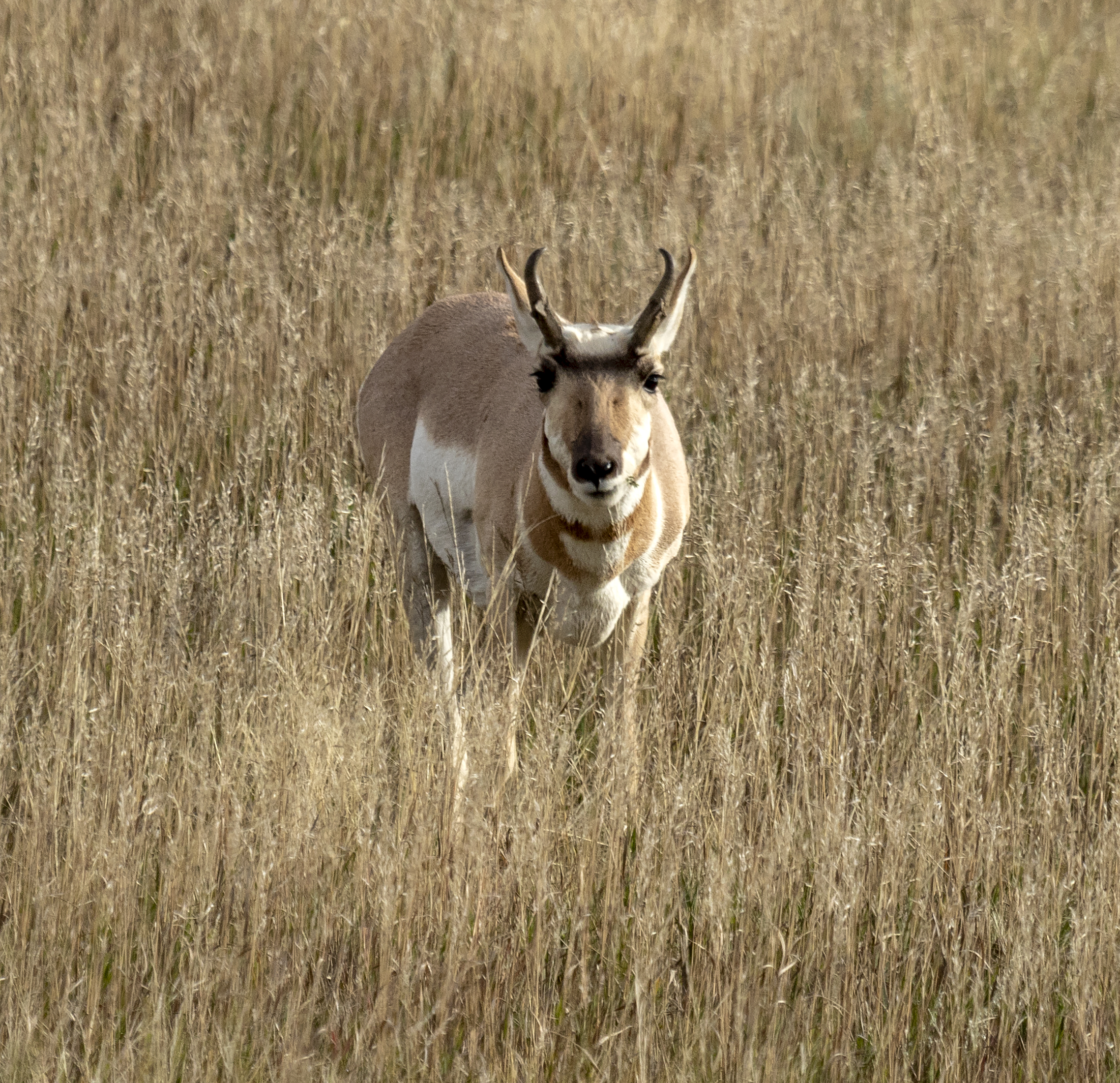
Pronghorn

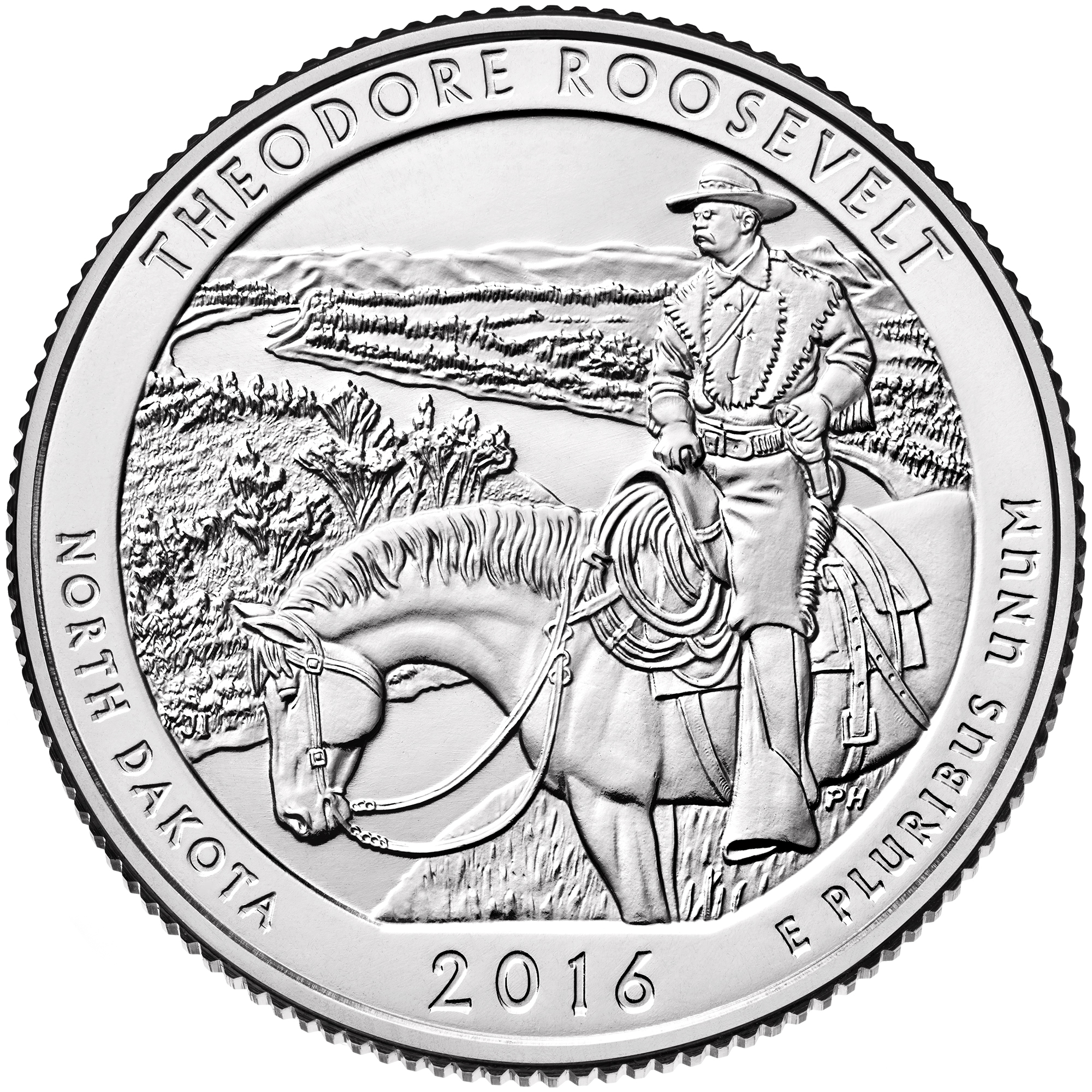
The park is featured on the reverse of North Dakota's 2016 America the Beautiful quarter, and depicts Theodore Roosevelt and the Little Missouri River

According to the A. W. Kuchler U.S. Potential natural vegetation Types, Theodore Roosevelt National Park has two classifications; a Wheatgrass/Needlegrass (66) vegetation type with a North Mixed grass prairie (18) vegetation form, and a Northern Floodplain (98) vegetation type with a Floodplain Forests (24) vegetation form.

The park is home to a wide variety of Great Plains wildlife, including bison, coyotes, cougars, mustang horses, badgers, elk, bighorn sheep, white-tailed deer, mule deer, pronghorn, prairie dogs, and at least 186 species of birds including golden eagles, sharp-tailed grouse, and wild turkeys. Nine longhorn cattle roam the North Unit.

The bison, elk, and bighorn sheep were reintroduced to the park. Park officials manage populations of bison, horses, and elk to maintain a balanced ecosystem. The entire park has been surrounded with a 7-foot tall (2.1 m) woven wire fence which keeps horses and bison inside the park and commercial livestock out. Other animals are able to pass over, under, or through the fence in specific locations provided for that purpose. Elk seek refuge in the park from external hunting pressure. The elk reproduce and have been removed to mitigate resource damage from overpopulation. Prairie dogs are native wildlife that are considered a keystone species because of their foraging and burrowing behaviors that mix soils and promote native plant diversity, critical to healthy landscape ecology. They also serve as a prey base for a variety of other native wildlife.

After the park was fenced, a horse round-up held in 1954 removed 200 branded animals. A few small bands of horses eluded capture and went unclaimed. These horses continued to live free-range in the park. For several years the National Park Service tried to remove all horses from the park. In 1970, a change of park policy recognized the horse as part of the historical setting. Historically, the park conducted roundups every three to four years using helicopters to herd horses to a handling facility and then sold them at public auction. New methods for herd management were tried including contraceptives, low-stress capture techniques, genetics research, and partnerships with nonprofit horse advocacy groups. The 1978 Environmental Assessment document set a population goal for the demonstration herd to 35–60 head. The goal for number of horses and herd demographics is being reevaluated during the development of a new management plan with current research. The absence of livestock would enable reestablishment of natural grazing regimes to benefit native plant life and natural ecosystem function.

Twenty-nine bison were introduced to a South Unit in 1956 and subsequently transferred 20 bison from that herd to the park's North Unit in 1962. They are routinely culled down to approximately 200-500 and 100-300 animals, respectively. The gathering and reduction of the herd alternates between the two units each year. The bison are shared with Native American tribes to increase numbers in existing tribal herds and provide genetic diversity. The conservation of bison is an ongoing, diverse effort to bring bison back from the brink of extinction. The 2020 Bison Conservation Initiative by the Department of the Interior has five central goals: wild, healthy bison herds; genetic conservation; shared stewardship; ecological restoration; and cultural restoration. Six yearling female bison were transferred from Rocky Mountain Arsenal National Wildlife Refuge in 2020. National Park Service experts will study the extent to which translocated animals integrate into the established herds.

== Wilderness ==
Created by an act of Congress in 1978, the wilderness covers an area of 29,920 acres (46.8 sq mi; 121.1 km^{2}) and comprises over a third of the area of Theodore Roosevelt National Park. There are two geographically separated sections of wilderness, one in each of the two main units of the national park. The northern section covers most of the North Unit, in McKenzie County, whereas the somewhat smaller southern section covers only the western portion of the larger South Unit, in Billings County. The southern section is located at 46°59′N 103°33′W.

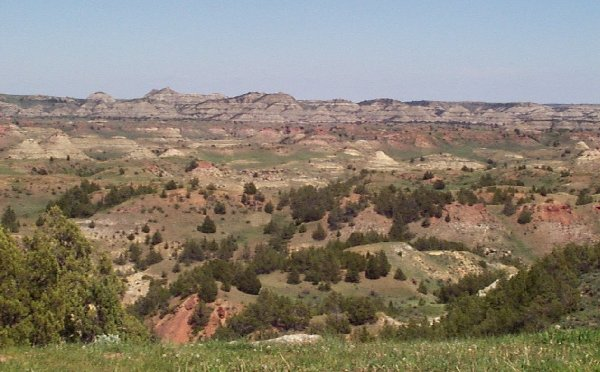
Badlands in Theodore Roosevelt Wilderness

The wilderness protects from development the wildest sections of the national park, an area described as badlands where erosional forces have carved steep cliffs into the relatively flat prairie. Bison, pronghorn, elk, mule deer, and coyote are all found here, along with hundreds of species of birds such as the bald eagle, falcon, and hawk. The wilderness is separated into two sections along with the park, a north and a south unit, by a distance of seventy miles (110 km). The Little Missouri River is on the south side of both units and is credited for being the primary erosional source which created the badlands topography.

Eighty-five miles (137 km) of trails allow access to the most remote sections of the wilderness. Camping is allowed with a permit, however gathering wood for fires is prohibited and overnighters are encouraged to bring a portable stove.

U.S. Wilderness Areas do not allow motorized or mechanized vehicles, including bicycles. Although camping and fishing are usually allowed with a proper permit, no roads or buildings are constructed and there is also no logging or mining, in compliance with the 1964 Wilderness Act. Wilderness areas within National Forests and Bureau of Land Management areas also allow hunting in season.

== Attractions ==
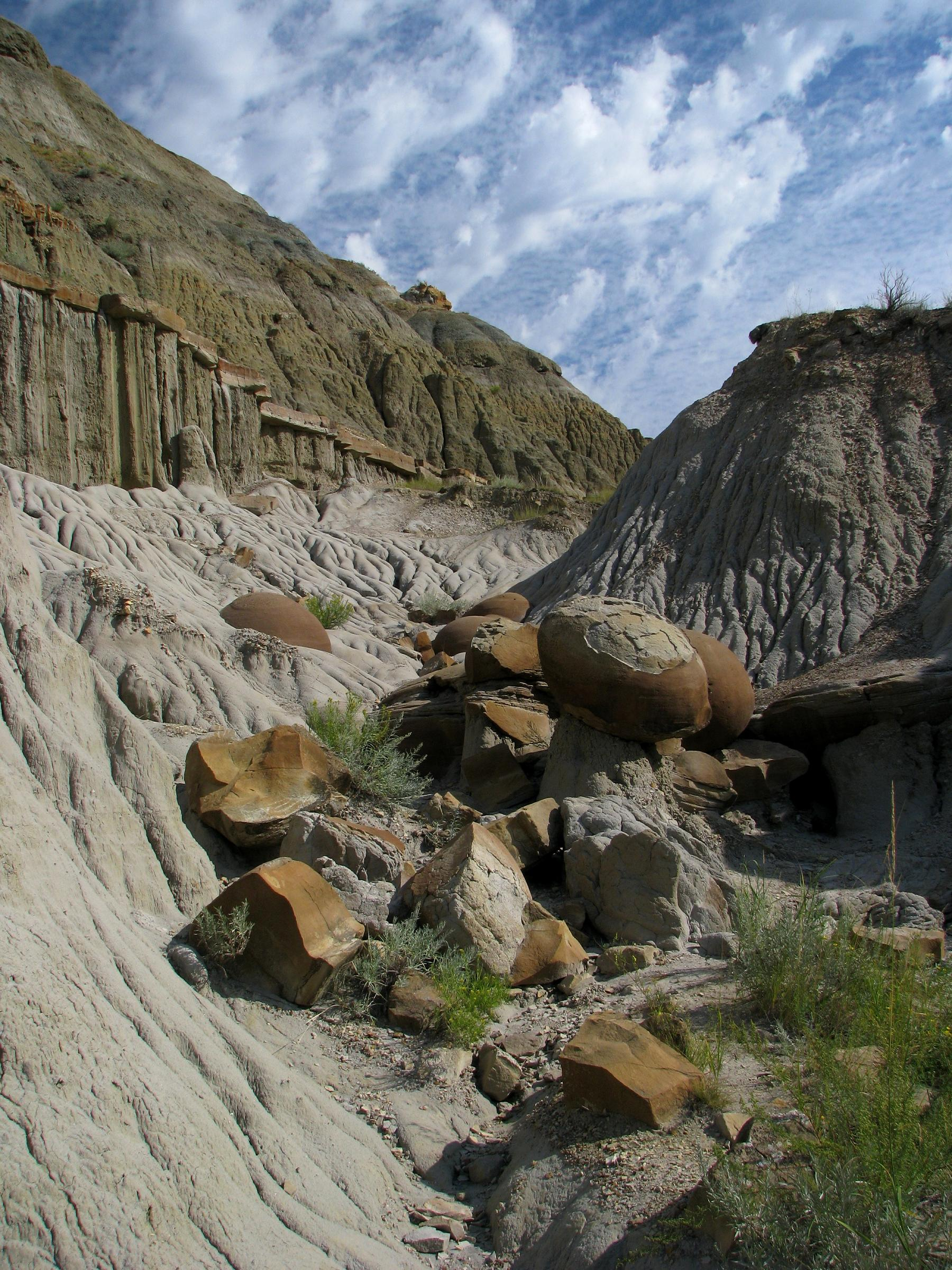
Cannonball concretions in the North Unit

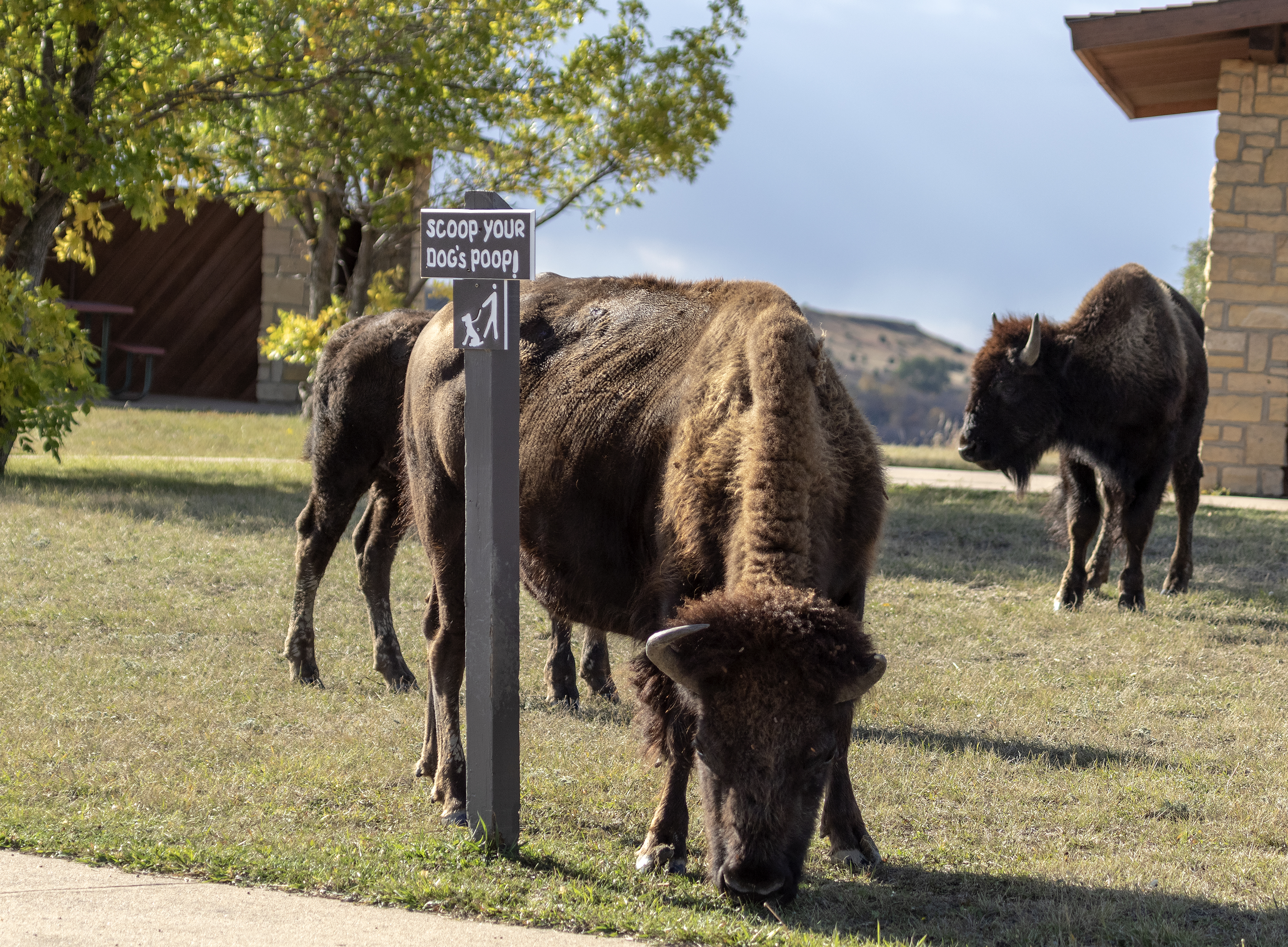
Bison at the Painted Canyon Visitor Center

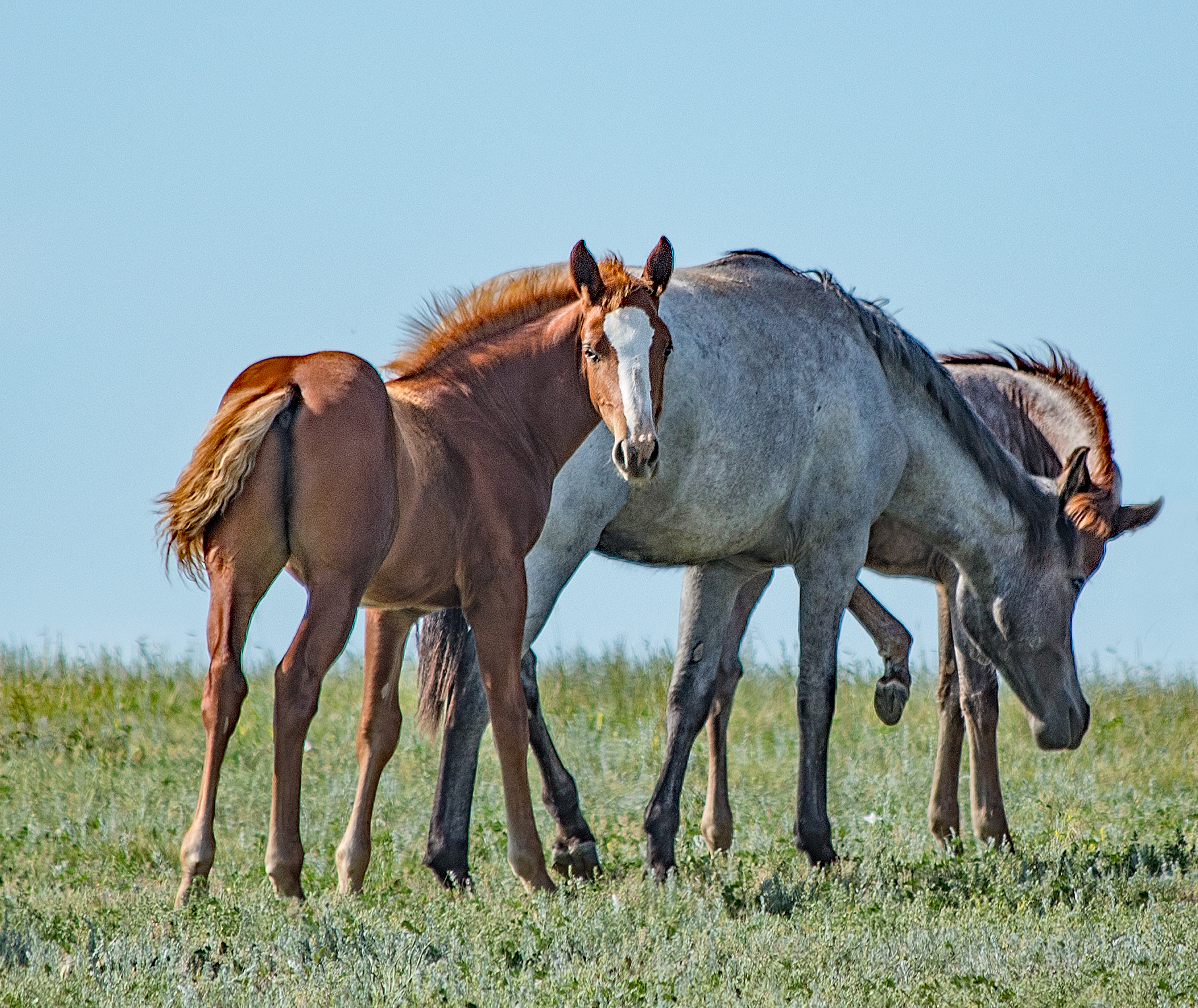
Wild horses

Both main units of the park have scenic drives, approximately 100 miles (160 km) of foot and horse trails, wildlife viewing, and opportunities for back country hiking and camping. There are three developed campgrounds: Juniper Campground in the North Unit, Cottonwood Campground in the South Unit, and the Roundup Group Horse Campground in the South Unit. Wildlife viewing is popular.

The brown, dormant grass dominates from late summer through the winter, but explodes into green color in the early summer along with hundreds of species of flowering plants. During winter, snow covers the sharp terrain of the badlands and locks the park into what Theodore Roosevelt called "an abode of iron desolation".

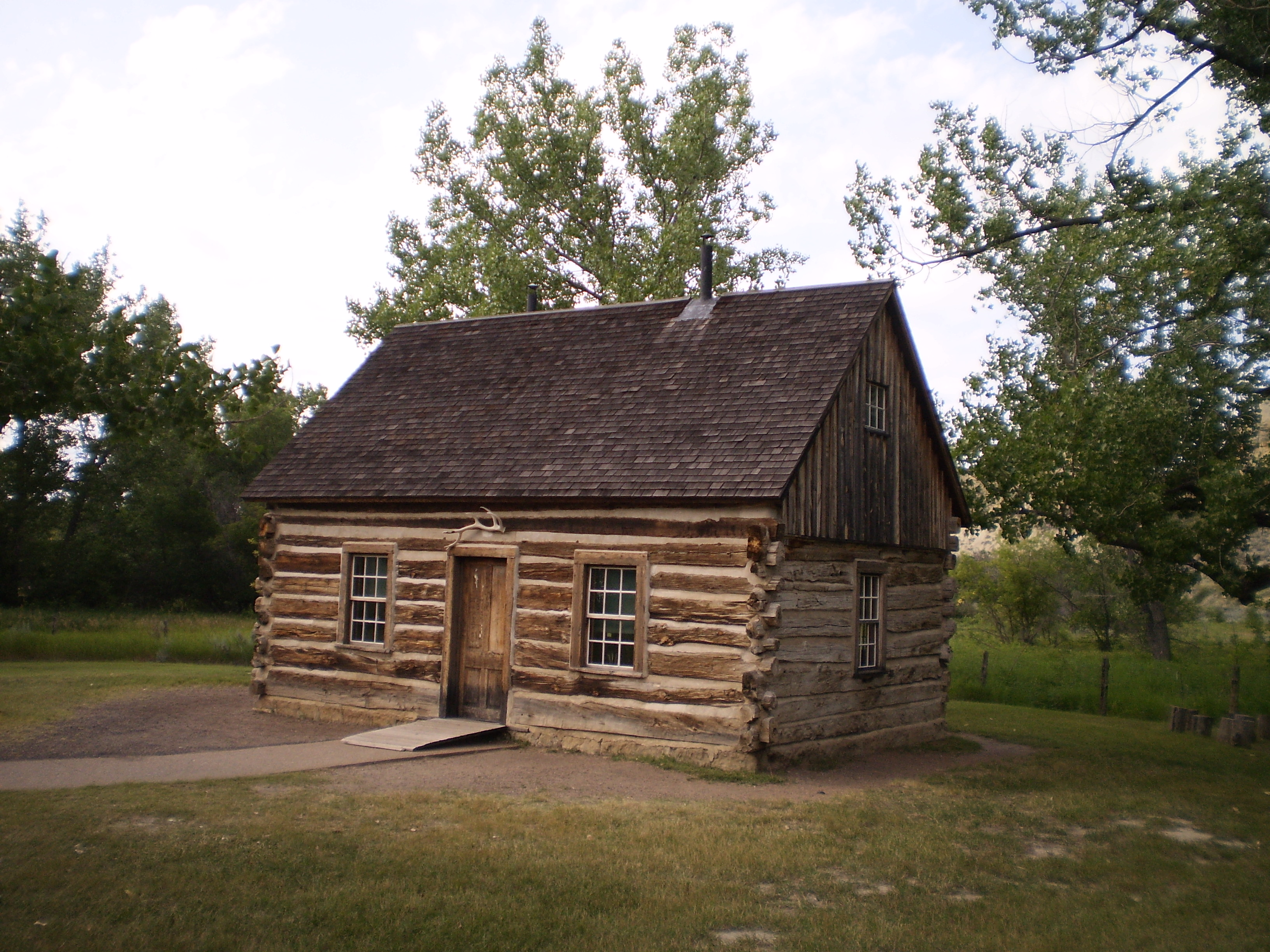
Theodore Roosevelt's Maltese Cross Cabin

A museum at the South Unit Visitor Center provides background on Roosevelt and his ranching days. Roosevelt's Maltese Cross Cabin is at the South Unit Visitor Center.

Roosevelt's Elkhorn Ranch is a separate, remote area of the park, 35 miles (56 km) north of Medora, accessible by gravel roads. The foundation of the ranch house and other shops buildings have been preserved, though the other portions of the cabin were removed and re-purposed after Roosevelt vacated the ranch. Threats to the Elkhorn Ranch site include oil development on adjacent lands, particularly visual intrusions and noise pollution from oil facilities and traffic.

The park units are mostly surrounded by grasslands. The area has very dark night skies with excellent star gazing and occasional northern lights.

The town of Medora, at the entrance to the south unit, provides a western experience, with wooden planked sidewalks, old fashioned ice cream parlors, and buggy rides. There are several museums and the Burning Hills Amphitheater with nightly productions of the Medora Musical from early June to early September.

The Theodore Roosevelt Presidential Library, a privately operated museum about Roosevelt's life, opened in 2026 about 1.5 miles (2.4 km) west of Medora, near the South Unit entrance.

== See also ==
- List of national parks of the United States
- Presidential memorials in the United States
- Elkhorn, 2024 television series
- Sentinel Butte Formation
