= Julian Ritter =

American painter

- Born: Julian Stawski; September 19, 1909; Hamburg, Germany
- Died: March 4, 2000 (aged 90); Kula, Hawaii, United States
- Education: Hugo Schnars-Alquist; Chicago Art Institute; Art Center School
- Known for: Painting, charcoal drawing, portraits, murals
- Movement: Munich School

Julian Ritter (September 19, 1909 – March 4, 2000) was an American painter of Polish-German descent who painted primarily nudes, clowns and portraits.

Ritter's paintings were typically rich in color. His nudes celebrated the glamor and beauty of the female form. All of his figurative paintings expressed the humanness in his subjects. He also painted landscapes at different points during his career and complex compositions dealing with mystical and spiritual subjects during his later years.

== Early life ==
Ritter was born Julian Stawski on September 19, 1909, in Hamburg, Germany, the only child of an aspiring Polish actress.

Ritter settled in Los Angeles as a young adult. He held many menial jobs during this time - dishwasher, errand boy, order clerk. He also painted lamp shades and did freelance art.

Ritter moved to Chicago and began to take a serious interest in art. He audited the night classes of Dr. Schroeder at the Chicago Art Institute. Ritter returned to Los Angeles where he later won a scholarship to the Art Center School (now, Art Center College of Design). He was introduced to figure painting under the tutelage of Stanley Reckless who had studied at the Philadelphia Academy of Art and taught in the tradition of Frank Duveneck and the Munich School. This tradition involved the classical study of anatomy and used live models for subjects. The Munich School is characterized by a naturalistic style and dark chiaroscuro.

While still a student at Art Center School, Ritter received the following positive review for a showing of his work at the Brice-Lowe Galleries:

Still another young artist holding his first local showing is Julian Ritter, whose water colors are at the Brice-Lowe Galleries. Of German birth he depicts various types and stages of man. Character is what interests him. His people are driven, by life or will. In one picture we see a procession of mendicants woefully singing or posing for sympathy, each a carefully studied type. In another a woman pushes the man who, in turn, pushes the wheelbarrow (his load) out on to the slender plank over the abyss. He has individual types of great interest: the old philosopher talking forever to a blank wall, the peasant woman going to church against the wind of life. Ritter's color is very delicate and helpful to his purpose, which is, however, mainly expressed through sensitive drawing.

Ritter graduated Art Center School in 1932 and found work at Los Angeles's film studios painting portraits for movie sets and doing other set design for Warner Brothers, MGM, Paramount and Universal. Ritter met the tall actress Francesca Chesley (1913–2004) in 1933. They were married on December 16, 1934. She frequently modeled for his nude paintings. They divorced in 1943.

Ritter headed to San Francisco looking for work at the Golden Gate International Exhibition of 1939. He was hired by architect Mark Daniels to paint murals for the Mines, Minerals and Machinery Building. These 90-foot murals were a great success. With money from the fair, Ritter returned to Los Angeles where he rented a small studio and began painting.

Ritter exhibited at both the Gallery of Modern Art and the Newhouse Galleries in New York City during 1941. Both exhibitions were critically acclaimed. The Art News (March 15, 1941) wrote: "His style shows fluency and ease" and Arts Digest (November 15, 1941) wrote: "Ritter is more than versatile, he is complex, exceptionally talented." Edward Alden Jewell of the New York Times noted that Ritter's work was shown in the small entrance room of the Gallery of Modern Art, devoted to small oils, watercolors and gouaches in addition to the main exhibit. New York Times art critic, H.D., wrote of the Newhouse Galleries exhibition:

Paintings and drawings by Julian Ritter, who has done portraits of movie stars, studied anatomy and been under contract to act in the films, may be seen at the Newhouse Galleries. This is rather flashy work with more than a little cleverness, and includes three paintings accompanied by poems—rather dire comments on life today.

The one-man show at the Newhouse Galleries was a particular success and led to portrait commissions. While attending a party thrown by a patron who commissioned a portrait of his daughter, Ritter got drunk and stripped off his clothes, calling the other attendees "phony baloneys". He returned to Los Angeles.

Ritter met Hildegarde "Hilde" Sabena Meyer-Radon in 1942 when he saw her walking past his studio to take violin lessons from an instructor next door. Hilde had been born in Hamburg, Germany, on October 5, 1919; she immigrated to the US with her family in 1923. Hilde's appreciation for the arts led to a very warm friendship between the two and they saw each other often.

== World War II ==
At the US entrance into the war, Ritter wanted to enlist in the US Navy due to his love of the sea, his sense of adventure and his loyalty to his adopted country. However, since he was not a US citizen, the Navy would not let him enlist. However, he was drafted into the US Army in November 1942. He was assigned to the 40th Engineer Regiment which was organized in Camp Pickett, Virginia, attached to the 45th Infantry Division which was part of General George Patton's 7th Army. Ritter was initially a member of the 3rd Battalion which trained at Fort Lewis, Washington.

While at Camp Pickett, Ritter was selected to paint a portrait of Lt. General Ben "Yoo-Hoo" Lear who was the commanding officer of the 2nd Army based in Tennessee. Ritter asked Hilde to come join him at Memphis, and he asked her to marry him. Because there was no waiting period for a marriage license in Mississippi, Hilde and Ritter traveled the next morning to Hernando, Mississippi, where they got a license and were married in a small chapel on April 9, 1943. The two had a six-week honeymoon in a Memphis hotel room while he completed the painting of General Lear. After the portrait was complete, Ritter returned to Camp Pickett but was reassigned to the 1st Battalion which was later re-designated as the 2829th Battalion.

The 40th Engineers received additional training at Fort Pierce, Florida, and then deployed to the Gulf of Oran, Algeria, for further training. He took part in the invasion of Sicily.

Based on his military service, Ritter became a US citizen on October 30, 1943. He attained the rank of Technician Fourth Grade (T4) and served at both Regimental headquarters and the headquarters of the 1st/2829th Battalion.

In October 1945 Ritter returned to Los Angeles to paint and to raise a family.

== Post-war Southern California ==
=== 1945 to 1966 ===
When Ritter first returned from the war, he found himself unable to paint anything but morbid, gruesome paintings of death, darkness and despair for about a year. After this he began his most prolific period. He would regularly work long hours and he became known for his fine nude studies and clowns.

Ritter and Hilde had two children while living in Hollywood: Christine was born in 1947 and Michael in 1948.

Art critic Arthur Miller of the Los Angeles Times wrote in a 1947 review of Ritter's one-man show at the James Vigeveno Galleries in Westwood, California:

Julian Ritter, still-young painter and etcher who has not shown here in many years, has a large exhibit at the James Vigeveno Galleries to June 12. It shows him remarkably gifted and various.

Some will like his many paintings of girls or nudes, done in charming colors, or his characterful portraits of older folk or children. Others may prefer his slightly sardonic, action-packed grotesques of circus clowns or of merely comical people. He also can turn deeply serious with "Refugees" or "Slums."

In a 1948 "Brush Strokes" column in the Los Angeles Times commented:

Julian Ritter's paintings of clowns, on view in the gallery at 401 S Lake Ave., Pasadena, are notable for liveliness of expression and color. Ritter has chosen to paint clowns, he explains, because 'In the clown one sees all the emotions a man can express; to record him is to depict humanity itself.'

Ritter moved the family to Don Pio Drive in Woodland Hills, California, in the early 1950s. The home included a studio building on a hilltop which, like all his studios, featured a pot-belly stove. In addition to his painting, Ritter was a talented landscaper and he terraced the front and rear hills with steps, paths and pools all made from slabs of broken concrete.

At the urging of his brother-in-law, Stewart Potter, Ritter began selling his paintings in Las Vegas in February, 1950. The two made the trip from Los Angeles to Las Vegas in Ritter's 1949 Dodge Wayfarer, a yellow convertible with no rear seat and an extended trunk which would be packed with paintings. The two went from casino to casino without any success until they met Bill Moore, the owner of the Hotel Last Frontier. Ritter sold Moore 13 framed nudes for $1000 which would become the basis of the Silver Slipper Collection of paintings. Ritter and Potter would make additional trips to Las Vegas and sold additional paintings to the Hotel Last Frontier and its adjoining Silver Slipper Casino. They also sold paintings to other hotels, casinos and their employees.

Shortly after this, Otto Eitel, owner of the Bismarck Hotel which was at the center of Chicago's Loop entertainment district, invited Ritter to do a one-man show at the Swiss Chalet Galleries and to paint a mural for the Bismarck Inn. This show was successful and led to numerous commissions including the "Mr Whimsey" clowns for the U.O. Colson Company. Ritter's wife and children stayed in Chicago with him for several months while he completed his commissions.

Ritter was enjoying success with his clown and nude paintings but, at the same time, he felt trapped by this success. He was not painting the great works he imagined. For inspiration, in 1956 he moved his family to Mexico, primarily living in San Blas, Nayarit, a small town on the Pacific Coast of Mexico located between Mazatlan and Puerto Vallarta. Ritter wrote in a note published in the Los Angeles Times "the place is a paradise for landscape painters and living is cheap." Ritter said later, "My time in San Blas was important to me. I developed a new conception of color and a self-assurance which made me a better painter."

After nearly a year in San Blas, Ritter returned to California in 1957 and purchased the house at 2321 Edgewater Way in the Santa Barbara Mesa neighborhood. Ritter again turned the yard into a garden.

Hilde worked at the noted Brooks Institute of Photography while Ritter continued to paint steadily as his paintings commanded higher values. Most importantly, Ritter was, at last, free to paint the works he wanted to. Ritter's work was represented in continuing exhibitions at the Poulsen Galleries in Pasadena and at frequent showings at the James Vigeveno Gallery in Westwood. He was also represented in San Francisco by the Maxwell Galleries and the Kotzbeck Gallery, and by galleries in Palm Springs and Scottsdale. Ritter was at the height of his commercial success but he disliked that the galleries were making money that he felt should be going to him. He had always had a somewhat stormy relationship with his dealers and preferred to deal directly with collectors. About this time, Ritter successfully set out to build a group of patrons who could provide financial security and independence, however, many of these collectors were demanding the familiar nudes and clowns that Ritter had tired of.

In 1958, the Circus company in Los Angeles published and distributed five reproductions of mounted 8x10 inch paintings. The paintings included the clowns Dilly, Flim, Flam, Helter and Skelter.

In 1963, Ritter had a show at the Poulsen Galleries in Pasadena, California. It was generally well-received with Scott McClean, the gallery director, stating "This is probably the first exhibit to show the whole range and variety of the work of a man who has been known for two specialties – nudes and clowns. I think this broader view of Julian Ritter's work is long overdue."

But not all reviews of Ritter's work were glowing. A 1964 Los Angeles Times review of the same exhibit by Constance Perkins stated:

...[Ritter's] fame rests largely on his sensual paintings of the nude figure. Second in popularity are Ritter's clowns. From any aesthetic viewpoint, both the pink nudes and the clowns become ingratiatingly sickly, redundant and commercially dull although technically capable enough. Almost unknown are the artist's portrait pieces and a series of both large canvases and small abstract drawings in which the surreal element is dominant. The portraits are traditional and the most genuine. The drawings become very 'slick.' The large canvases, on the other hand, tend to be too personal and too involved in allegory to hold as significant statements.

In 1964, Hilde had been sick for a year but refused to see a doctor. When she collapsed, Ritter insisted and doctors discovered she had cancer. She had a mastectomy and struggled for two years before succumbing to the disease. Hilde died January 22, 1966.

Ritter began drinking heavily. He later said, "I became a lousy cowardly drunk after my wife died. I had no respect for myself - morally, physically or spiritually. My mind and my body and my inner-self were too tired to conceive anything. I was burnt out."

=== 1966 to 1985 ===
During 1965–66, Ritter painted a portrait of 17-year-old Lauren "Laurie" Kokx. He felt that he needed to get away from the Edgewater Way house that held so many memories of his wife, so he sold the house and its contents for $37,000. He bought a custom-built yawl still under construction in Morro Bay, California. Ritter named the boat Galilee, and with the assistance of a two-man crew, on February 2, 1968, he sailed it to various ports including Acapulco, Mexico, where he was joined by Kokx. They sailed to Puntarenas, Costa Rica, where he painted for six months. He then sailed to the Galapagos Islands, Tahiti, Moorea and Bora Bora, sketching tropical scenes for later development as paintings. In December, 1968, a show was mounted at the Bernard Gallery in Los Angeles of works painted in Puntarenas that Ritter had sent home.

With Kokx and another crew member, Ritter left Bora Bora for Hawaii on June 17, 1970, expecting a 30-day voyage. Serious problems arose with the boat's equipment, and it began to take on sea water. Continually bailing, Ritter and his crew drifted for 87 days, running out of food and water, fearing death. On September 14, 1970, the Galilee was rescued by the U.S. Navy combat stores ship, USS Niagara Falls. Ship's doctor Philip A. Becker described the emaciated crew members as "living skeletons only four days away from death."

Ritter and Kokx recuperated in Hawaii for a month, then returned to California. Although he was still recovering and underweight, Ritter gave a three-hour talk at a Los Angeles gallery about being lost at sea. In attendance were family members, patrons and his first wife.

Ritter appeared on the TV game show To Tell the Truth along with two "impostor" contestants and the celebrity panelists in an episode that aired December 22, 1970. All three of the panelists picked Ritter since he was the only one of the three contestants who looked like he had been lost at sea without food.

Ritter donated six of his clown paintings for an auction to raise money for a group working for the release of American prisoners of war held in North Vietnam. The auction was held mid-December 1970. Among the guests of honor was Francis Gary Powers whose U-2 spy plane was shot down over the Soviet Union. One painting, a 24x36 oil, was reportedly sold for $3600. Ritter made the contribution out of sympathy for the prisoners and their families and personal gratitude to the Navy for his rescue. Ritter said "I know what deprivation is after that ordeal. I can relate to the terrible suffering of those POWs."

Ritter and Kokx settled into a house in rural Summerland outside Santa Barbara for 15 years. Ritter's near-death experience catalyzed two years of intense painting. During this period, Ritter was arguably at the peak of his artistic expression. He was already a fulfilled artist who saw himself as a maestro and people treated him accordingly. His subject matter included paintings which were more mystical as he worked out the demons from the voyage, his loss of Hilde and his own alcoholism. To meet the demands of his collectors and his need for money, Ritter continued painting nudes, portraits and occasional clown compositions.

Ritter had a show in late 1975 at the Howard E. Morseburg Galleries on Wilshire in Los Angeles which included some of this new work. The show was called "Julian's World" and consisted of 101 paintings and 16 drawings. This was Ritter's last major public exhibit. One painting which did stand out was a crucifixion: Ritter had posed and was photographed and then painted himself onto the cross in a self-portrait.

Ritter preferred to sell directly to collectors so he could make more money. Ritter had a sufficient number of patrons at this point in his life so that he no longer needed to rely on gallery showings. However, many of these patrons were most interested in his commercial nudes and clowns rather than the more artistic paintings.

== Hawaii ==
In the summer of 1984, Ritter and Kokx separated. In 1985, Ritter and his son Michael moved into a house in Kula, Hawaii, on the island of Maui. He suffered a debilitating stroke in December 1985. After a period of convalescence, Ritter began painting again. Although the stroke limited his painting ability, he wrote and he taught painting.

In 1989, Michael commissioned a 30-minute video about the life and art of his father, titled Julian Ritter—Palette of passion. It was written and produced by Keith Gilchrist and was filmed and directed by Christopher Gentsch.

Ritter died at home on March 4, 2000, at the age of 90.

== Religion and politics ==
Ritter was raised a Roman Catholic although he was not religious in his adult life — Ritter led the life of a hedonistic artist. Some family members recount that he did frequent Catholic churches to reflect. Although his paintings were not overtly religious, many of his works did have a mystical quality. One example is "The Clown Funeral". In it, clowns are bearing one of their own, eyes closed but wearing a beautiful clown smile. Ritter appears in self-portrait in the painting. Some compare this painting to El Greco's "El Entierro Del Conde De Orgaz" ("The Burial of the Count of Orgaz").

== Friends and patrons ==
Ritter had a number of interesting friends. George Morgan, the son of Frank Morgan (The Wizard of Oz), who was wealthy from the family business distributing Angostura Bitters, was a drinking buddy. John Coleman, who taught at Art Center, and his family were also close friends who visited the Edgewater Way house frequently.

Ritter befriended Chick Rosenthal who lived in the same Hollywood bungalows in the 1930s and maintained that friendship until Rosenthal's death. Rosenthal accompanied Ritter to New York in a van in 1941 when Ritter was offered the one-man show at the Newhouse Galleries.

Ritter began a long-term friendship with Rudolph Axford from Venice, California, in the mid-1950s. Axford shared Ritter's conservative politics and love of boats, and was a Ritter patron who accumulated many pieces of his work.

Greg Autry was another friend and patron. Autry met Ritter in 1983 after he purchased a fake Ritter in a Laguna Beach gallery. Autry both commissioned paintings and purchased other examples of Ritter's work. Autry purchased the Silver Slipper collection of Ritter's paintings from the Summa Corporation in a closed-bid auction in the late 1980s.

== Art ==
Although Ritter was best known for his oil paintings of nudes, clowns and portraits, he also worked in other media including pen-and-ink with watercolor, charcoal and Conté crayons and painted other subjects including portraits, landscapes, and complex compositions. He also liked doing caricature, often drawing cartoons rather than sending letters to friends. Ritter's style changed over the course of his life.

Art historian and award-winning author Phyllis Settacase Barton wrote of Ritter:

Labeling the work of Julian Ritter is not easy because his genius is not readily defined. This is because for most of his life he has painted women as though he were exploring a garden – with eyes, lips and nipples painted like blue, red and pink blossoms. His earlier work also includes lots of clowns, many of which he painted with introspection and compassion – generally to the exclusion of their surroundings – telling us that his mind, heart and eye were in league with the human being beneath the costume, behind the make-up. As an adventurer into human nature, he painted portraits, each flavored with the spirit of the sitter, each embodying the effervescence of the cycle of life. In viewing all of these paintings – nudes, clowns, portraits – we begin to become aware that Julian Ritter has been on a journey – not just a physical journey – but a speculative one in which he has really been exploring himself. But the quintessential Julian Ritter comes to us through a series of sumptuously painted, monumental pictures which I choose to call lifescapes. His promethean story about how he has travelled from spiritual darkness into the shimmering world of rapture. Julian's magnificent vertical work which he calls 'The Black Hole' tells us the story of Julian's transgression and his penance.

One example of a mixed-media watercolor and chalk is "Bachelor's Housekeeping" painted in 1939. The painting was at the DeYoung Museum in San Francisco in 1963.

Ritter had a steady presence in the Los Angeles art scene with exhibitions and showings from 1947 through 1975 when he had his last major gallery showing at the Howard E. Morseburg Galleries in Los Angeles. His work was typically on display in any given week at some gallery in Southern California as evidenced through display ads in the Sunday Los Angeles Times. He was also frequently listed in the Calendar section of the Los Angeles Times. After this, Ritter had a sufficient number of patrons to support his lifestyle without the need for gallery showings.

=== Portraits ===
Ritter painted a number of prominent Californians. He also painted many actors, especially while employed at Warner Brothers where he would paint an actor in his current role. For instance, he painted Paul Muni in his role as Zola in The Life of Emile Zola. He also painted Ruby Keeler, Clara Bow, Claudette Colbert, Olivia de Havilland and Veronica Lake.

=== Nudes and showgirls ===
Ritter painted several variations of the horizontal nude pose. Other nudes include paintings of Janet Boyd, a successful Las Vegas showgirl, who he also painted as a showgirl in his painting "The Gibson Girl." Boyd later wrote to Ritter: "...I only got to be with you a few years but wonderful memories I have and will cherish. Not every girl gets to be a Ritter model. I loved every moment posing for you. The early mornings working in the studio in Santa Barbara are happy memories for me. And because your works of me will keep me young and beautiful forever." There were many other nudes using various models.

Ritter painted a number of nudes of his first wife, the actress Francesca Chesley. Ritter also painted a couple of nudes of his second wife, Hilde. The latter remain in the family collection.

He also painted many showgirl paintings, the most famous of which is "Ruby," a painting of an African-American girl. He made several showgirl paintings using a model named LeeAnn which were also commercially successful.

=== Clowns ===
Although he had painted clowns before, Ritter started painting a series of unusual or tender clowns in the summer of 1948. His first visit to a circus was in 1949. Ritter said of his clown paintings "I don't need to see clowns. My clown portraits are more like human portraits in clown make-up. They are a combination of my imagination and my memory of faces, or even my own face."

Ritter was commissioned in the early 1950s by an art gallery on Ventura Blvd in the San Fernando Valley to paint a set of small 8"x10" clowns called the Helter Skelter Clowns. The clowns included Dilly, Dally, Flim, Flam, Pitter, Patter and Helter and Skelter. These were reproduced for the mass market in 1958.

Ritter also painted a series of clowns based on "Mr. Whimsey," a clown with his dog. The U.O. Colson Company of Illinois commissioned Ritter to paint a set of these paintings for a calendar. He painted several more "Mr. Whimsey" paintings, some of which were part of the Silver Slipper collection.

Ritter also painted a number of clown compositions featuring groups of clowns (e.g.,"Clown Band and "Clown Funeral") and clown with nude or showgirl montages. Some of these feature a single clown with his arm around a showgirl, others portrayed a single nude surrounded by a variety of clowns and others were groups of clowns.

Ritter tired of painting his commercially successful clowns and made the painting "Clown Funeral" to announce the end of his clown paintings. After that, he painted only the occasional clown composition or a clown painting commissioned by a patron.

=== Landscapes ===
Although he was known primarily as a figurative painter, Ritter painted a number of landscapes, particularly when he was in San Blas, Mexico, and when he made his Pacific voyage. Ritter said of the San Blas paintings that they informed him with a new sense of color. The South Pacific seemed to further transform Ritter's paintings in much the same manner as it had on Paul Gauguin decades earlier. Though these never achieved the commercial success of his nudes and clowns, they were arguably amongst his best paintings.

=== Lifescapes ===
Ritter was a man who lived in his emotions. His paintings have been described as a "visual record of his emotional life." Nowhere is this more true than in the paintings art historian Phyllis Settacase Barton called "lifescapes."

It could be argued that the first of these lifescapes were the clown compositions. The painting, "Clown Band" is no less a joyful presentation of life than Ritter's later work, "God's Children." "Clown Funeral" was a deeply introspective look with Ritter, in self-portrait, carrying the body of a fallen clown - his announcement that he was no longer interested in painting the clowns that had brought him so much commercial success. The montages of clown with either nudes or showgirls shows the duality in all of us - the sensuality and eroticism of the female form with the detached folly of the accompanying clown(s).

But the true lifescapes were those works that Ritter painted when he had the patronage that allowed him to eschew dealing with galleries - Ritter finally started painting the great compositions which he saw in his visions. These works were described as "mystical looks into the core of existence and the meaning of life." Many of these were painted during and after the voyage that almost took his life but which also opened his mind and heart to see deeper and more introspective subjects and expressions. Paintings of the voyage revealed the absolute terror in the hollowed-out eyes of the subjects. The mystical paintings revealed a faith that higher powers were at work.

One critic wrote "Julian is a man who has seen life, absorbed it and now presents it." Sweeping and majestic paintings presented the very essence of Ritter's emotions. "The Carousel" was a complicated composition exploring man's spiritual nature. Ritter dealt with man's hypocrisy in "The Sunday Preacher". Ritter's "Man on the Cross" was a deeply personal view into Ritter's emotions as he painted his self-portrait onto the cross. One critic wrote of the piece: "Undoubtedly, it is a daring and modern interpretation of life. It is a work which will cause considerable controversy. But what great artist hasn't caused that? What artist of any note has not or will not speak his own mind through his pictures?"

When Ritter and Kokx separated in the summer of 1984, Ritter's work became more dark expressing the aloneness he felt in his partner's absence.

Ritter's work changed again when he went to Maui, building again on the spiritual. Art historian Phyllis Settacase Barton wrote of these paintings: "In the glowing panoramic scenes, powerfully and prayerfully, Julian Ritter lets us in on some of his most intimate secrets, eases us into his precious discoveries and shares with us deepest concerns."

=== Silver Slipper Casino collection ===
The Silver Slipper Casino collection started in February, 1950 when Ritter sold 13 framed nude paintings for $1000 to Bill Moore, the owner of the Last Frontier Hotel. By 1962, 33 paintings of nudes, showgirls, clowns and clown/nude montages adorned the walls of the upstairs theater.

On April 4, 1955, the Last Frontier Hotel became the New Frontier Hotel under the management Jacob Kozloff. In 1967, Howard Hughes bought both the New Frontier Hotel and the Silver Slipper Casino.

After Hughes' death, Howard Hughes' Summa Corporation sold both the Silver Slipper Casino and the Frontier Hotel to the Elardi family in 1988 and divested itself of its contents including the paintings which were auctioned off in a closed-bid auction. Greg Autry won the auction and continues to hold the collection which has not been seen for many years.
