= Church of Santo Tomé, Toledo =

Church in Toledo, Spain

Coordinates: 39.8568°N 4.0281°W

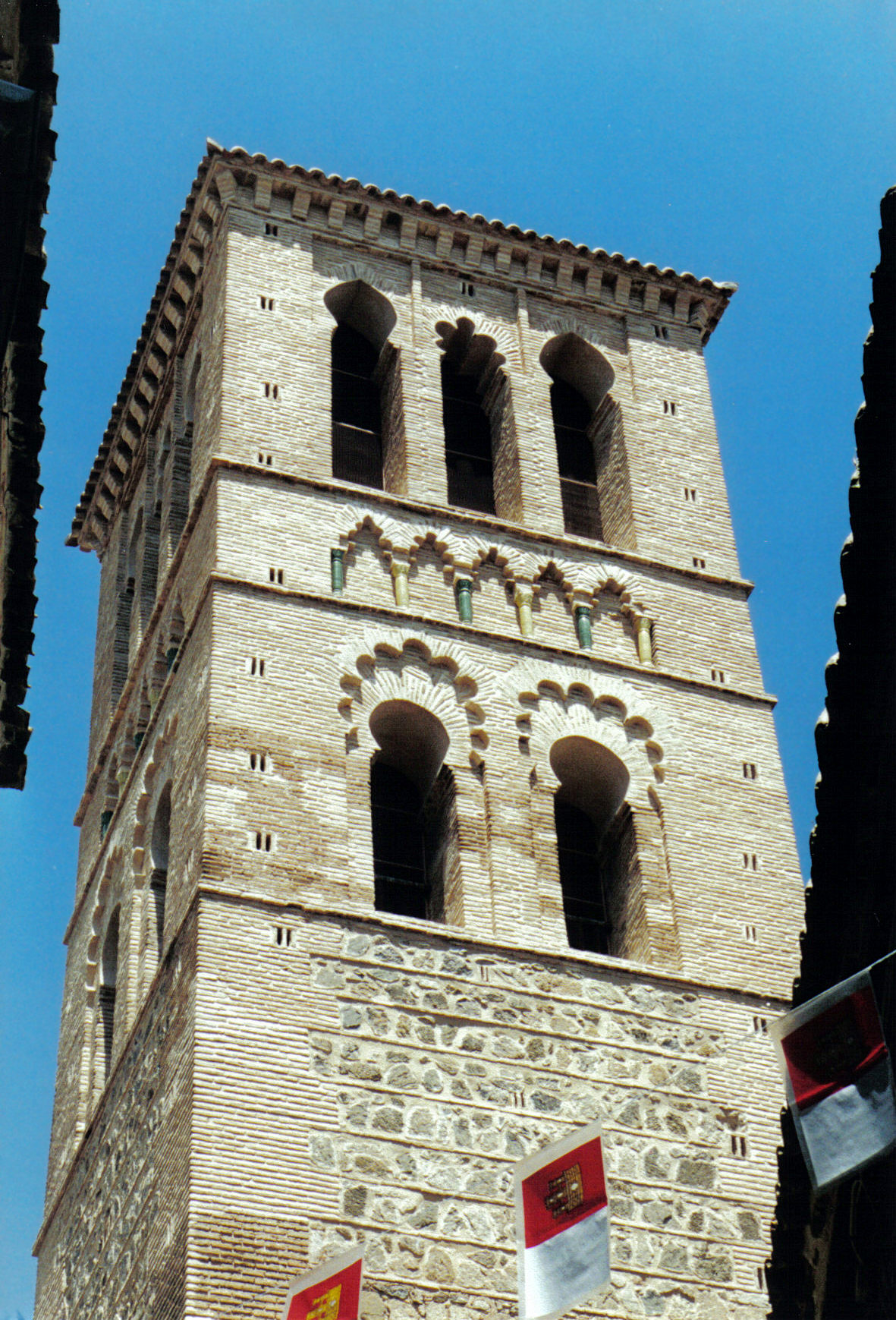
Mudéjar tower inlaid with glazed ceramic of the church of Santo Tomé

The Iglesia de Santo Tomé is a church located in the historical center of the city of Toledo (Spain), and was founded after the reconquest of this city by King Alfonso VI of León. It appears quoted in the 12th century, as constructed on the site of an old mosque of the 11th century. This mosque, together with other mosques in the city, were used as Christian churches without major changes, since in the taking of the city there was no destruction of buildings.

However, at the beginning of the 14th century, being in a ruinous state the church was totally rebuilt in charge of Gonzalo Ruiz de Toledo, Lord of Orgaz, and the old minaret of the mosque was transformed into a bell tower in Mudéjar style. Its fame is mainly because it contains the painting The Burial of the Count of Orgaz by El Greco, which can be seen by accessing the back of church.

== Interior ==
The building consists of three naves with crossing, covered by barrel vault and polygonal apse. In order to construct the greater chapel, with mixture of Mudéjar and Gothic, the Lord of Orgaz ordered to demolish the old head and elevate the central dome in form of Rub el Hizb with the nerves painted. On the side of the gospel, near the high altar, a door leads to the entrance of the bell-tower and from there it can be climbed by means of a staircase.

It has the church in its chapels, two baroque reredos, one plateresque and a baptismal font of the 16th century. It highlights an image of the Virgin Mary of 12th century and the reredos with Ionic elements of the greater chapel of the 19th century, that replaced an earlier churrigueresque one, in this reredos is in its central part a painting, "The unbelief of St. Thomas", by the painter Vicente López Portaña."

=== Chapel of the Conception ===
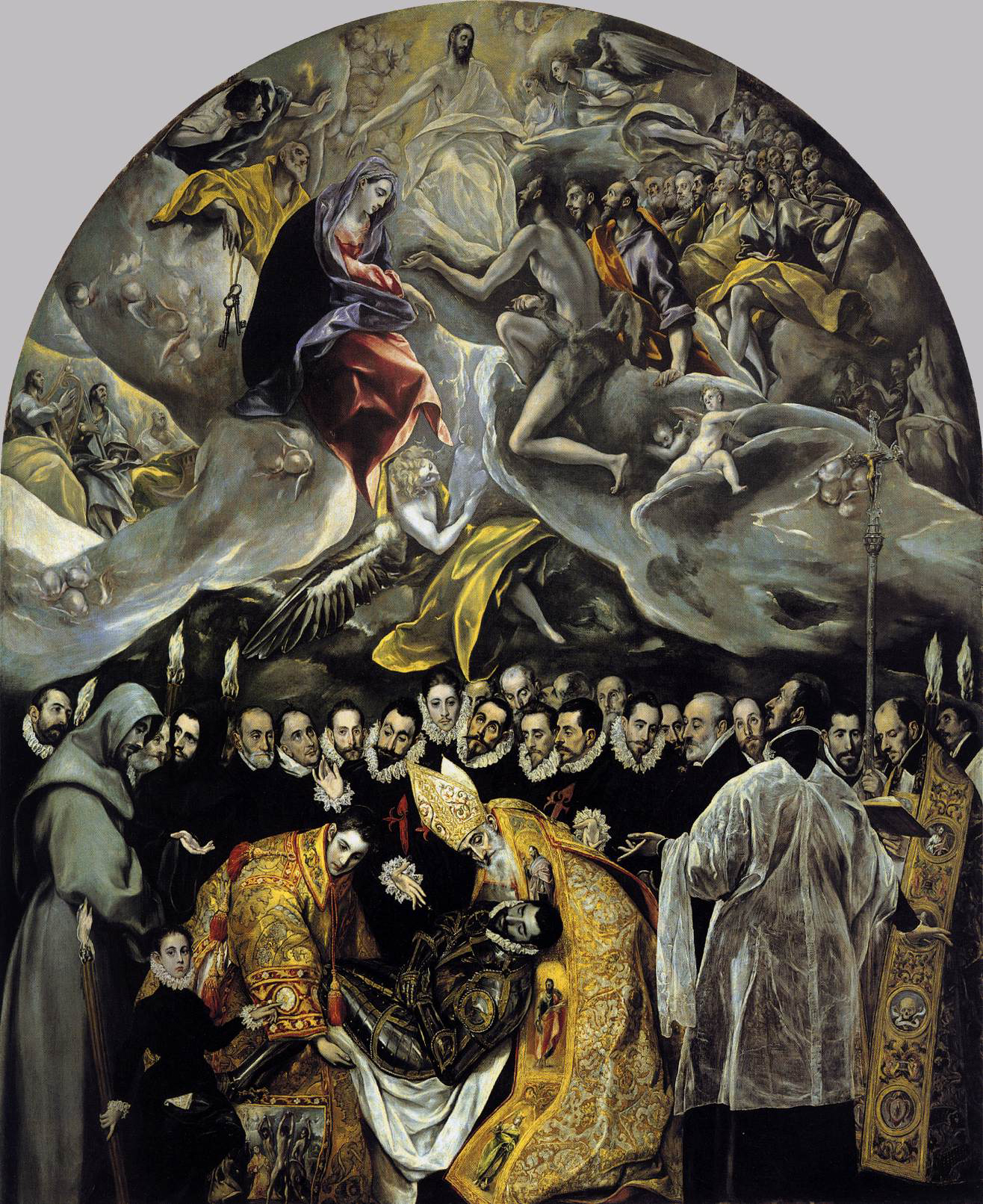
The Burial of the Count of Orgaz in the Iglesia de Santo Tomé

At the feet of the nave corresponding to the side of the Epistle, in the so-called Chapel of the Conception is buried by his own request in his will, Gonzalo Ruiz de Toledo, mayor of Toledo, benefactor of this temple and dead in 1323. According to a legend, in its burial appeared Saint Stephen and Augustine of Hippo to place it in his burial, the mentioned miracle is the one that is represented on his tomb, the painting "Burial of the Count of Orgaz" made by El Greco in 1584 by order of which it was in that time parish priest of the church Andrés Núñez de Toledo, which for this occasion did the reforms constituted the creation of a new quadrangular plan covered by a half-domed vault and on the walls to adore four half-point arches, inside one of them was placed a gravestone engraved with the explanation of the miracle and on top of it, adapting itself to the arc of the wall, the painting.

The inscription of the epitaph in Latin and gold letters on black marble was performed by Alvar Gómez de Castro.

D. V. et P.
Támetsi properas, Siste Paululum Viator, et antiquam urbis nostre historiam paucis accipe. Dñs. Gonsalvus Ruiz á Toleto Orgacii Oppidi Dñs. Castelle major Notarius, inter caetera sue pietatis monumenta, Thomae Apostoli, quam vides aedem, ubi sé testamento jussit condi, olim augustam et malesartam, laxiori spatio, pecunia sua instaurandam curavit, additis multis, cum argenteis tum aureis donariis. Dum eum humare Sacerdotes parant, ¡ecce res admiranda et insolita! Divus Estéphanus et Augustinus caelo delapsi propis manibus hic speliernunt. ¿Que causa hos Divos impulerit? Quoniam longum est, Agustinianos Sodales non longa est via: si vacat, roga. Obiit anno Xpi. M.CCC.XII. Caelestium gratum animum audisti: Audi jam mortalium inconstantiam. Eclesie hujus Curioni et Ministris, tum etiam Parroquie pauperibus arietes 2, gallignas 16, vini uteres 2, lignorum vecturas 2, nummos quos nostri Morapetinos vocant 800 ab Orgatiis Quotannis percipiendos idem Gonsalvus testamento legabit. Illi, ob temporis diuturnitarem, rem obscuram fore sperantes, cum duobus ab hinc annis pium pendere tributum recusarent, Pintiani conventus sentencia convicti sunt. Anno Ch. M.DLXX. Andrea Nonio Matritano hujus templi Curione, strenue Defendente, et Petro Rusio Durone Economo.

— To the God of the living and the dead
Even if you go fast, stop a little, walker, and hear in a few words an ancient history of our city. Don Gonzalo Ruiz de Toledo, Lord of the villa of Orgaz and Notary Major of Castile, among other proofs that he left us of his piety, took care that at his expense this church, which you are seeing of St. Thomas the Apostle, once narrow and ill-made, in which he ordered by his testament to burial, and also made donations of gold and silver. When the priests were preparing to bury him, look at what a strange and wonderful thing! St. Stephen and St. Augustine come down from heaven and bury him with their own hands. What could be the cause that encouraged these Saints? As it would be long to tell, the Augustinian religious are not far from here; if you have time go there and ask, they will tell you. The year of Christ died 1312. You have already heard the effects of the gratitude of the inhabitants of heaven; Now hear the inconstancy of mortals. Gonzalo himself ordered in his will that the neighbors of Orgaz pay every year for the priest, ministers and poor of this parish, 2 rams, 16 hens, 2 hides of wine, 2 loads of firewood and 800 maravedises. But the tributaries, hoping that the course of time would have darkened the law, refused these past years to satisfy the command, but they were compelled to do so by judgment of the Audiencia (or Chancellery) of Valladolid, in the year 1570, having bravely defended Andrés Nuñez de Madrid, priest of this temple, and Pedro Ruiz Duro his butler., Epitafio in the church of Santo Tomé of Toledo

== Exterior tower ==
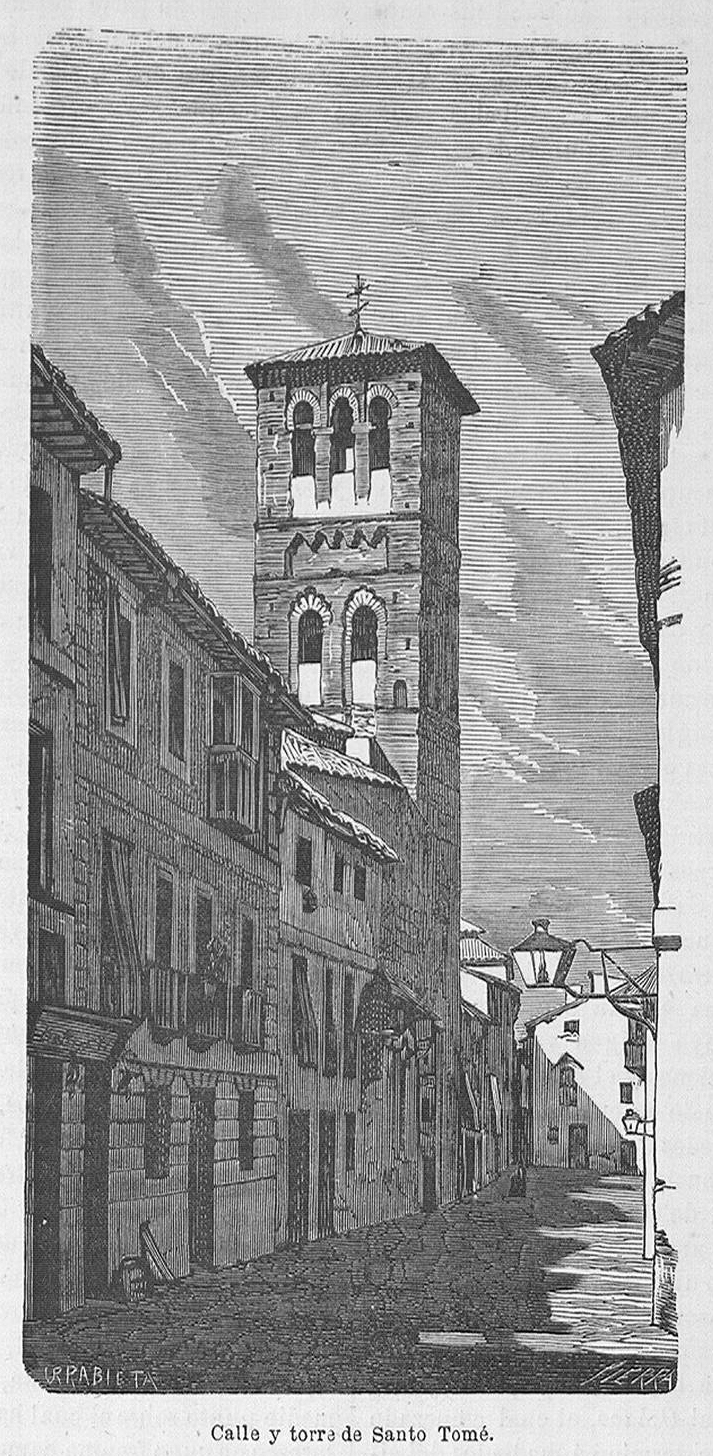
Drawing of the street and tower of Santo Tomé in 1866

The old minaret rebuilt in the 14th century by the lord of Orgaz, is of square plan, in what can be called Toledan Mudéjar, with masonry and brick very well preserved and based on the Iglesia de San Román of the same city. The tower contains incrustations of glazed ceramics and in its two upper bodies, double bell, groups of two and three windows open and between these two floors a frieze decoration of blind archery with lobulated arches and separated by small columns of glazed clay. The crowning is made with a kind of string of "sawtooth".

Next to a twinned window of the tower on the second floor, is embedded a Visigothic plate-niche of white marble with scallop and cross patada adorned with the letters Alpha and Omega and studied as a similar piece to the prototype realized in the workshops of Mérida, that would have extended its influence in those of Toledo.

== Access to the church ==
The church is opened on a daily basis to allow the public to view the painting. An entrance fee is charged.

== Bibliography ==
- Demetrio ernández González (2003). Gonzalo Ruiz de Toledo, Lord of Orgaz: (1323). Toledo: Theological Institute San Ildefonso. ISBN 978-84-93253585.
- Manuel González Simancas (2005). Toledo: Its Monuments and Ornamental Art. Valladolid: Maxtor. ISBN 84-9761-148-9.
- Eduardo Mariátegui (1866). Chronicle of the province of Toledo. Madrid: Ronchi y Compañía.
- Sixto Ramón Parro (1857). Toledo in the hand or historical-artistic description of the magnificent cathedral and other famous monuments: tome II. Toledo: Imprenta y Librería Severiano López Fando.
