= USS Niagara Falls =

Cargo ship of the United States Navy

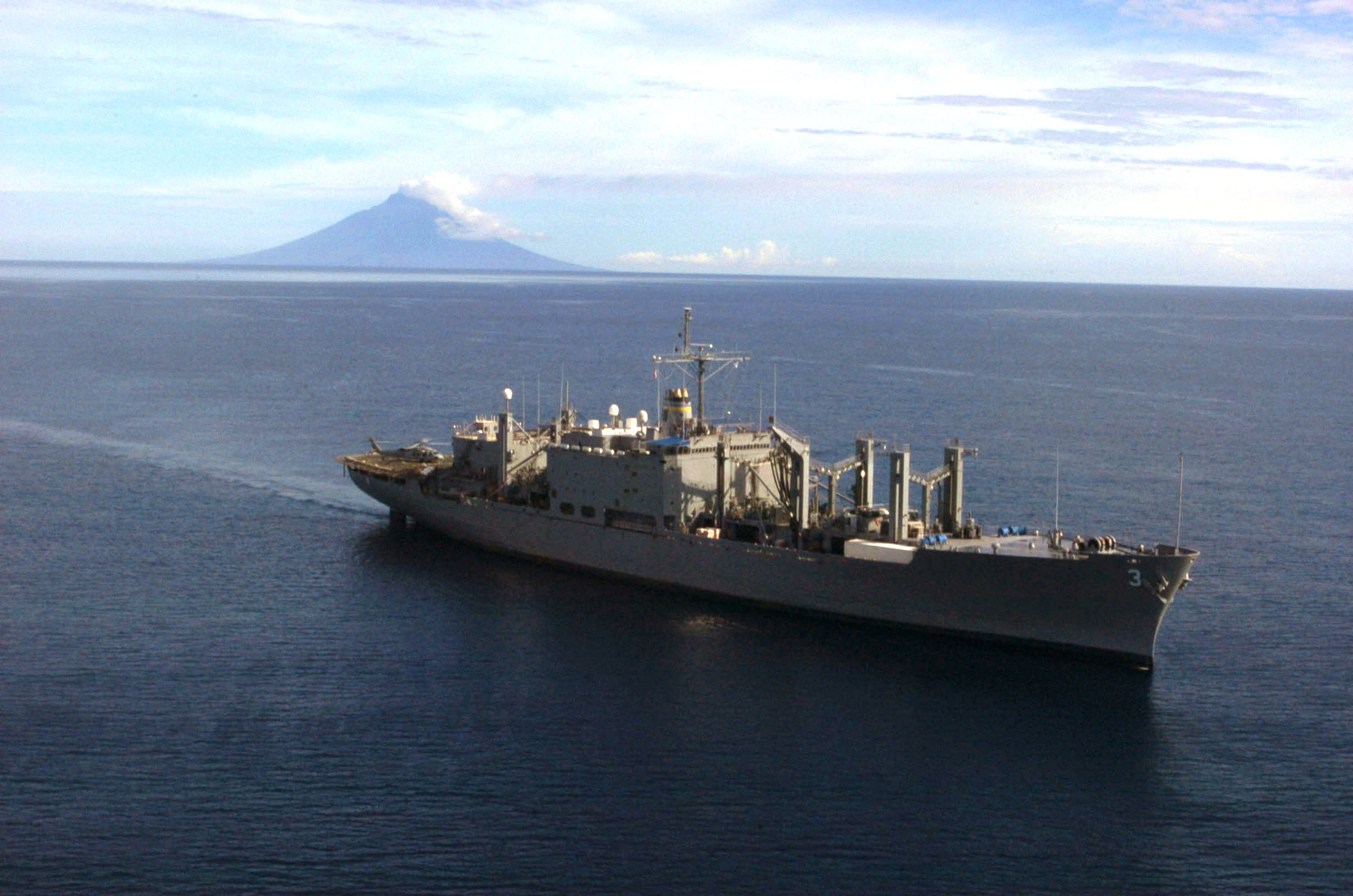
- USNS Niagara Falls off the coast of Badang, 2005

History

United States
- Name: USS Niagara Falls
- Namesake: The city of Niagara Falls, New York
- Builder: National Steel and Shipbuilding Company, San Diego
- Laid down: 22 May 1965
- Launched: 26 March 1966
- Commissioned: 29 April 1967
- Decommissioned: September 1994
- Home port: San Diego, CA; Sasebo, Japan; Alameda, CA ( – Sep 1983); Guam, (1983–1994)
- Nickname(s): The Fighting Falls
- Fate: Transferred to Military Sealift Command, 23 September 1994.
- Name: USNS Niagara Falls
- In service: 23 September 1994
- Out of service: 30 September 2008
- Home port: Guam, (1994–2008)
- Nickname(s): Fighting Falls
- Fate: Sunk as a Target

General characteristics
- Class & type: Mars-class combat stores ship
- Displacement: 17,500 long tons (17,781 t) full load
- Length: 581 ft (177.1 m)
- Beam: 79 ft (24.1 m)
- Draft: 27 ft (8.2 m)
- Propulsion: 3 × Babcock & Wilcox boilers; 1 × De Laval turbine, 1 shaft
- Speed: 20 knots (37 km/h; 23 mph)
- Complement: As USS : 480–530 (with HC-5/3 Air Detachment); As USNS : 49 Navy, 125 civilian merchant seamen
- Armament: As USS : 4 × Twin 3"/50 caliber guns (2×2); Later reduced to Two Forward Twin 3"/50 caliber guns; Chaff launchers; 4 × M2 12.7×99mm heavy machine guns; As USNS : 4 × M240G 7.62×51mm medium machine guns or M249 5.56×45mm light MG; 1 M2 12.7×99mm heavy machine gun when security detachment is embarked
- Aircraft carried: As USS : 2 × UH-46 Sea Knight helicopters HC-5 Providers; As USNS : 2 × SH-60 Sea Hawk helicopters HSC-25 Island Knights

USS Niagara Falls (AFS–3), a Mars-class combat stores ship, was the only ship of the United States Navy to be named after the City of Niagara Falls, New York. Commissioned into the US Navy on 29 April 1967, she served until September 1994, when she was transferred to the US Military Sealift Command to serve as USNS Niagara Falls (T-AFS-3). Assigned to the Naval Fleet Auxiliary Force, Far East, she served until 30 September 2008, when she was finally deactivated.

Niagara Falls was designed to deliver refrigerated stores, dry provisions, technical spares, and general stores type matériel to the Fleet at sea. Her configuration provided for rapid issue rates using a minimum of men and the latest in transfer-at-sea methods, cargo handling, storage techniques, and automation. She was capable of simultaneous replenishment of one ship on each side as well as transfer of matériel by cargo helicopters, which she carried.

== Service history ==
Niagara Falls was laid down on 22 May 1965 at the National Steel and Shipbuilding Company in San Diego; launched on 26 March 1966; sponsored by wife of the senior senator Jacob Javits, from New York; delivered to the Navy at the Long Beach Naval Shipyard, Long Beach, California, on 20 April 1967; and commissioned on 29 April.

After initial shakedown, the new combat store ship loaded 2,500 tons of stores at Naval Supply Depot, Oakland, and through September completed final acceptance trials and post-shakedown availability at San Diego.

=== Vietnam, 1968–1973 ===
By 4 February 1968, Niagara Falls completed her shakedown availability and continued preparations for her first deployment. She steamed for WestPac on 28 March, arrived at US Naval Base Subic Bay, Philippines on 14 April, and there conducted the first of many replenishments.

Upon arrival on 22 April at An Thoi, South Vietnam, she transferred over 100 tons of matériel, and two days later she supplied amphibious units in Vũng Tàu. In Cam Ranh Bay 25 April, Niagara Falls supplied ships and the Naval Support Activity there. She also supplied ships of the Naval Gunfire Support Group off the Vietnam coast, and made several replenishment swings through the Yankee Station and Market Time areas.

Niagara Falls completed the last replenishment of her 1968 deployment on 15 September, called at Hong Kong from 17 through 21 September, at Pearl Harbor from 9–10 October, and arrived back at San Diego on 17 October. Completing preparations for another deployment and transfer of homeport to Sasebo to commence 3 January 1969 with the arrival of the New Year, Niagara Falls steamed for WestPac a second time.

During the Vietnam War Niagara Falls participated in the following campaigns: Vietnamese Counter Offensive Phases IV, V, VI; Tet 69 / Counteroffensive; Vietnam Summer/Fall 69; Vietnam Winter/Spring 70; Sanctuary Counteroffensive; Vietnamese Counteroffensive Phase VII; Consolidation I; Vietnam Ceasefire.

On 14 September 1970, Niagara Falls found and rescued the 45-foot (14 m) sailboat Galilee that had been the object of an intense search for more than a month. When sighted, the boat was about 400 nautical miles (740 km) west/northwest of Honolulu. The three crew members had been without food since 27 July (the Galilee departed Tahiti on 17 June for Honolulu). Rescued were Julian Ritter, Laurene Louise Kokx and Winfried Bernard Heiringhoff. According to the ship's doctor, the rescuees were days away from death.

During the period 15–30 July 1971 Niagara Falls and USS Sacramento are noted by USS Enterprise operating at Yankee Station as conducting a complex four-helicopter VERTREP.

Niagara Falls returned to Vietnam in 1972, continued its replenishment cycle of one weekend in port (normally Subic Bay) and two weeks "on line," throughout later 1972 and into early 1973. Normal routine included resupplying the destroyers on the gun line and continuing up to Yankee Station to replenish the aircraft carriers, including USS Ranger and USS Kitty Hawk. Following the cease fire, Niagara Falls supported Operation End Sweep to clear Haiphong harbor of the mines that were dropped by naval aircraft. Captain E.B. McDaniel served as Commanding Officer from June 1975 to September 1976.

The noted spy John Anthony Walker, Jr. (Johnny) served in Niagara Falls' radio room from 1971 to 1974. It was during his time aboard Niagara Falls serving as communications officer and Classified Materials Systems (CMS) custodian that Walker had access to the various cryptographic machines (KW-7, KWR-37, KG-14, KY-8, and KL-47) providing the keys for nearly all of them to the KGB. Being a supply ship, Niagara Falls received classified messages about ships movements off Vietnam and in the South China Sea. In order to deliver this classified information to soviet contacts, it is believed by investigators, that Walker made dead drops in ports of call including the Philippines and Hong Kong. Suspecting intelligence breach from the Niagara Falls, an intelligence operative was inserted as a junior Radioman in the mid-1970s to confirm, but the findings were inconclusive. Walker's accomplice Jerry Whitworth served aboard Niagara Falls as chief radioman and CMS custodian from 1978 to 1979.

=== Vietnam Agent Orange Legacy, 1968 ===
Niagara Falls was included on a list of ships that were exposed to Agent Orange. The Department of Veterans Affairs identified certain vessel types that operated primarily or exclusively on the inland Vietnam waterways. Because she went up river, Niagara Falls was recognized as exposed to contaminated waterways during missions on the Saigon River and in Cam Ranh Bay, 22–25 April 1968. Throughout the war, Niagara Falls was further exposed to runoff of Agent Orange and other herbicides when she anchored in Da Nang Harbor, returned to Cam Rahn Bay, and steamed along littoral waters of South Vietnam. Studies of Royal Australian Navy ships show that salt water evaporative distilling systems actually increased the concentration of Agent Orange in drinking and cooking water, and the distilling system became coated in herbicide toxins. The Department of Veterans Affairs is yet to recognize these Australian studies and grant health coverage to the "bluewater" sailors who have been exposed on Niagara Falls and other navy ships that performed missions along the Vietnam coast.

=== 1983–1991 ===
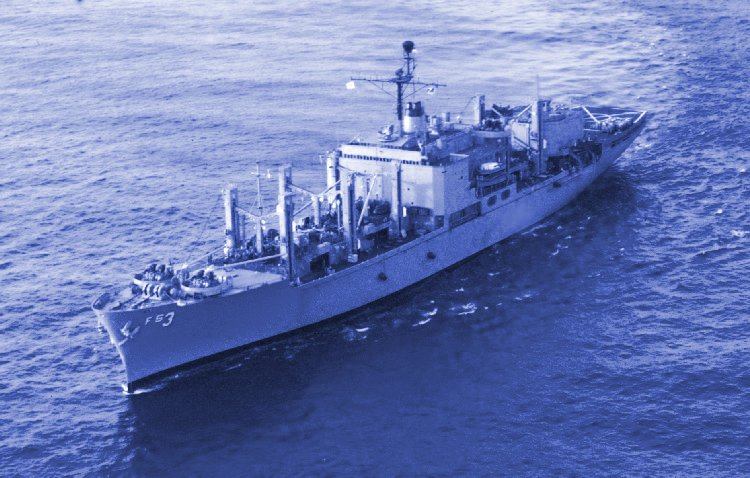
Niagara Falls

On 6 September 1983, Niagara Falls changed homeports to Guam and became part of the forward deployed elements of CTF 73/75, part of the 7th Fleet. From that time until January 1991 the ship conducted three Refresher Training sessions, five OPPRE's, four SMI's, five ARE's, and three INSURV Inspections. She made port calls to numerous locations such as Yokosuka and Sasebo, Japan; Hong Kong; Subic Bay and Cebu, Philippines; Bali, Indonesia; Fremantle/Perth, Australia; Singapore; Muscat, Oman; Bahrain; Pattaya and Phuket, Thailand; Fujiarah, UAE; and Diego Garcia. A number of these locations were visited more than once. Niagara Falls participated in numerous Fleet Support Operations including repeated Masirah Airheads, Operation Team Spirit and PACEX-89.

Niagara Falls received the "7th Fleet Finest Combat Logistic Support Ship" award for her performance in PACEX-89, a combined US, Korean, and Japanese naval exercise which was the largest since the end of the Korean War. Included in PACEX-89 such notable ships as New Jersey, Missouri, USS Enterprise and Nimitz. During PACEX-89 Niagara Falls was the command ship for the Underway Replenishment Group.

Due to the nature of the tasking of a combat stores ship, and the outstanding performance Niagara Falls provided in logistic support service, she has earned the nickname "Fighting Falls" by the Seventh Fleet. Through 1991 Niagara Falls had supported Seventh Fleet operations during 15 WestPac/Indian Ocean/Persian Gulf deployments. Niagara Falls was awarded the Meritorious Unit Commendation as well as receiving the Battle "E" after an extended deployment for almost eight months followed immediately by another short fuse deployment.

Niagara Falls participated in the Tanker War phase of the Iran–Iraq War supporting Operation Prime Chance and Operation Earnest Will. In one near action the Niagara Falls crossed paths with an Iranian minelayer and during a tense hour Niagara Falls, prepared to defend herself. There was no exchange of fire, the intelligence on the minelayer was relayed by Captain Gay to the fleet and the Iranian ship was subsequently intercepted by US Navy combatant forces. Niagara Falls often visited Bahrain, Fujiarah, Muscat, and the obligatory Masirah Airhead Evolutions during this time.

Niagara Falls was one of the first non-depot ships to be assigned female crew members, starting with Lt-Cmdr. Carol Rengstorff as Executive Officer. Approximately 30 female sailors and officers were made part of Niagara Falls crew shortly thereafter.

=== First Gulf War ===
Niagara Falls participated in Operation Desert Storm, transiting the Straits of Hormuz at midnight on 16 January 1991 and assigned an operating area in the northern end of the Persian Gulf, known as the 'NAG' or North Arabian Gulf operational area, this was the sea opposite Kuwait which was heavily mined by Iraqi prior to the start of combat operations. Due to limited mine countermeasure assets in the Persian Gulf and Niagara Falls operating area, an EODMU detachment was assigned. During the course of the war Niagara Falls destroyed five naval mines herself while operating in the northern Persian Gulf.

One interesting incident on 23 January was the visible flash of an explosion reported by the aft lookout, possibly an errant Scud missile which had been reported heading out into the Persian Gulf.

On 29 March Niagara Falls assisted the M/V Mercs Horana which was undergoing a major shipboard fire while underway in the central Persian Gulf. Niagara Falls arrived at night and the crew was presented with the sobering image of the Horana's superstructure fully engulfed in flames, and four other coalition ships, including Shasta and Francis Hammond circling the burning vessel. Niagara Falls At-Sea Fire Party was told to stand ready to motorboat over, however the Commonwealth Coalition ship in charge at the scene declined the manpower and requested spare fire fighting foam be supplied.

For spending 143 days in the combat zone, and operating North of 28.30 N and West of 49.30 E between 17 January–28 February 1991 the ship was awarded the Combat Action Ribbon. During the course of the war the Niagara Falls primary assignment was USS Missouri and her battlegroup, however she also serviced USS Ranger, the Amphibious Group, and the hospital ships. During this period Niagara Falls would mainly resupply from Jebel Ali, Dubai, however stops were also made at Bahrain and Abu Dhabi.

=== 1991–1994 ===
While returning from the Gulf War and enjoying a liberty call at Phuket, Thailand, when the volcano Mount Pinatubo erupted in the Philippines. Niagara Falls duty crews loaded some stores at Phuket and while ending the liberty port call early, proceeded to Singapore to load additional supplies, and steamed to Subic Bay to offload food and stores for the relief and recovery effort, named Operation Fiery Vigil. Even arriving in Subic Bay some days after the main eruption, Niagara Falls was quickly covered in layer of ash reminiscent of a heavy snowfall. Five crewmen were left in Phuket and rejoined the ship at her home port in Guam.

Late 1991 to early 1992 the ship entered drydock for refit and overhaul. This saw the upgrade to refueling station capacities by adding an "arm" to one of the ship's "M" Frames.

In the spring and summer of 1992, the ship took a mini-Westpac cruise of the south-west Asian ports of Singapore, Hong Kong and Japan.

On 19 September 1992 while transiting the Malacca Strait near Medan, Indonesia the ship responded to distress calls from the collision of the oil tanker Nagasaki Spirit and container ship Ocean Blessing. The Niagara Falls was the first ship on the scene, using her helicopters to search the waters for survivors and crew to secure the wrecked ships and body recovery.

In August 1992, Typhoon Omar swept through the island of Guam. The ship was down for service to main gear and was unable to go to sea. The ship was torn from its mooring lines and swept across the main harbor, hitting a refueling barge and ultimately running aground on the lagoon's shallow shore. The damage to the ship was minimal, however her sister-ship, White Plains, was torn from its mooring lines and ran aground on hard coral beach in Apra Harbor.

Once made operational, Niagara Falls sailed to the Yokosuka Naval Base's shipyard for further repairs and trials. The ship returned to Guam in early September to load its stores for its next deployment. The ship left late September 1992 for the Persian Gulf.

=== Military Sealift Command, 1994–2008 ===
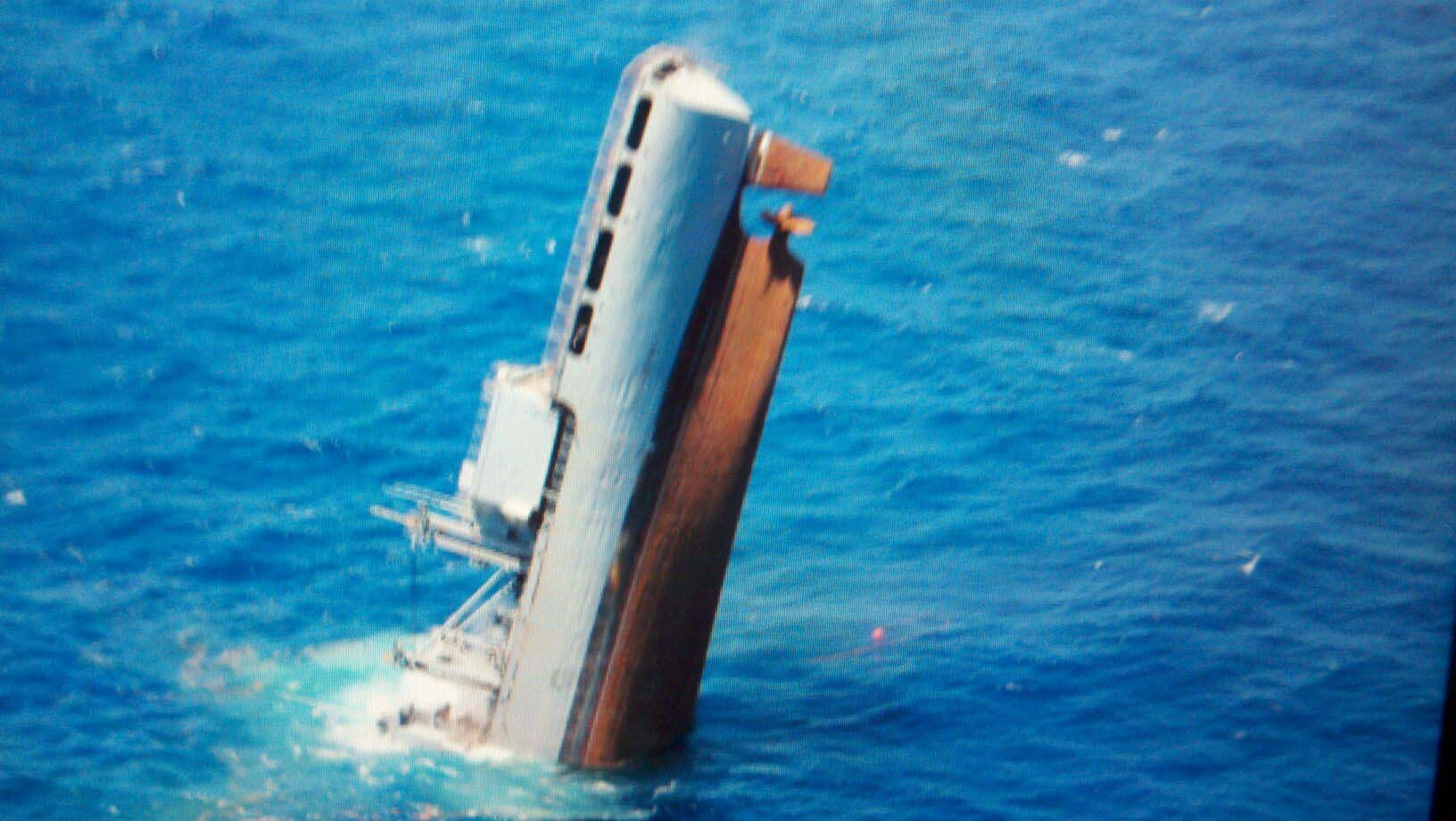
Ex-Niagara Falls sinking on 14 July 2012

Niagara Falls was decommissioned in September 1994 and assigned to the Military Sealift Command where she was placed in service on 23 September 1994 as USNS Niagara Falls (T-AFS-3), assigned to the Naval Fleet Auxiliary Force.

On 19 April 1997, while conducting a VERTREP with Constellation one of Niagara Falls UH-46E Sea Knight helicopters crashed into the sea. The crash occurred approximately 2,000 nautical miles (3,700 km) southwest of Hawaii and all four crew members were safely rescued. The helicopter crew members from Helicopter Support Squadron Five were rescued by the quick reaction of other CH-46 helicopters on-scene at the time of the incident. Assisting in the rescue was a motor-whale boat from Niagara Falls. The four crew members, who escaped injury, were transported to Constellation for medical observation and were released to Niagara Falls the same day.

Between 11 September and 27 November 2001 Niagara Falls broke both her Navy and TAR records for number of pallets moved with a total of 10,743 pallets, double the average number during a similar deployment time frame.

It was reported in April 2003 that Niagara Falls crewman had developed a unique external method for transporting mail during VERTREP to overcome differences of the SH-60 helicopters compared to the older, roomier HH-46 helicopters.

Niagara Falls was dispatched from Guam on 2 January 2005 in support of Tsunami Relief Operations (Operation Unified Assistance), ferrying relief supplies from Singapore to the Abraham Lincoln for distribution to the damaged areas.

On 27 October 2005 Niagara Falls ran aground while departing Malakal Harbor, Palau at 13:00 local time, but was able to free itself two days later at 16:20. There were no reports of injuries or leakage from the ship. Over the period of two days, Niagara Falls transferred fuel and cargo aft within the ship, reducing the weight of the forward area of the ship. During the afternoon high tide period on 29 October, the ship was able to free itself under its own power and with the assistance of a local tug boat.

USNS Niagara Falls completed her last mission support operation in July 2008, and was deactivated at Pearl Harbor in September 2008.

In 2010 the ship was selected to be sunk as a target.

At approximately 11:30 am 14 July 2012, Niagara Falls was sunk by multiple UTM-84, RGM-84, GBU-10, GBU-32 and 30mm impacts in waters 15,480 feet (4,720 m) deep, 63 nautical miles (117 km; 72 mi) southwest of Kauai as a target vessel during the 2012 RIMPAC exercise.

== Honors and awards ==
The USS Niagara Falls is authorized the following awards:
