= Gonzalo Ruiz de Toledo =

Spanish aristocrat

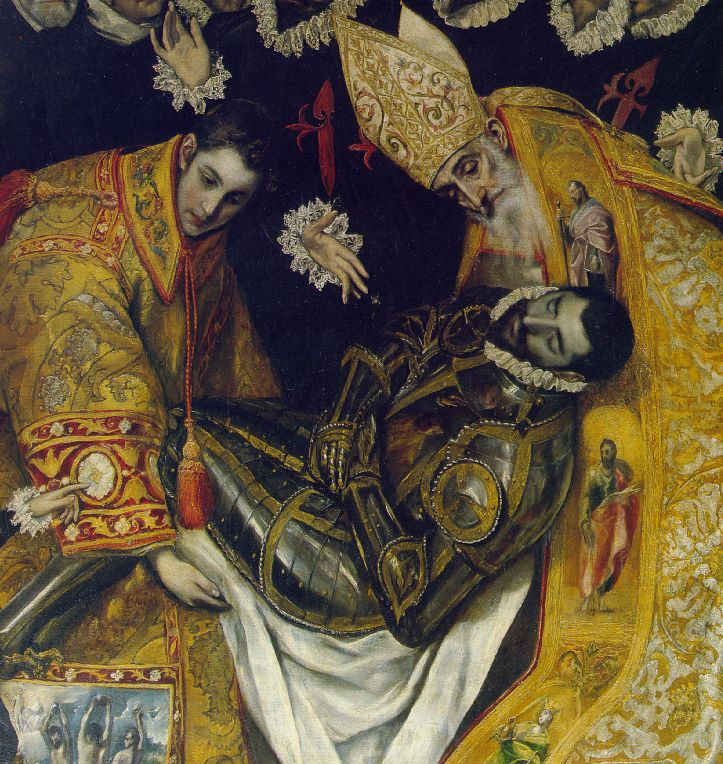
Detail of the painting showing the Count

Gonzalo Ruiz de Toledo (c. 1260 – 9 December 1323) was a Spanish aristocrat and statesman. Best known by the title "Count of Orgaz", (Note: Orgaz is a town in the province of Toledo. Somewhat confusingly, Gonzalo was not actually a count, but the family's title was upgraded to that of count in the 16th century.) he is depicted in a 16th-century painting The Burial of the Count of Orgaz by El Greco which is widely acknowledged as the artist's masterpiece.

The painting was commissioned for display in the Church of Santo Tomé in Toledo, where it remains to this day. It was part of a project organised in the 1580s by a priest, Andrés Núñez, who was refurbishing the burial chapel of Gonzalo Ruiz. The painting juxtaposes the miraculous events which, according to legend, took place at the time the Count was buried (Saint Stephen and Saint Augustine descended in person from the heavens) with realistic depictions of the inhabitants of Toledo. Núñez is portrayed in the painting, as are contemporaries from Toledo including the artist himself.

The church of Santo Tomé is opened on a daily basis. The building is of architectural interest, but the main attraction for tourists is the painting. An entrance fee is charged.
