= Eugene McDaniel =

United States Navy captain (1931–2026)

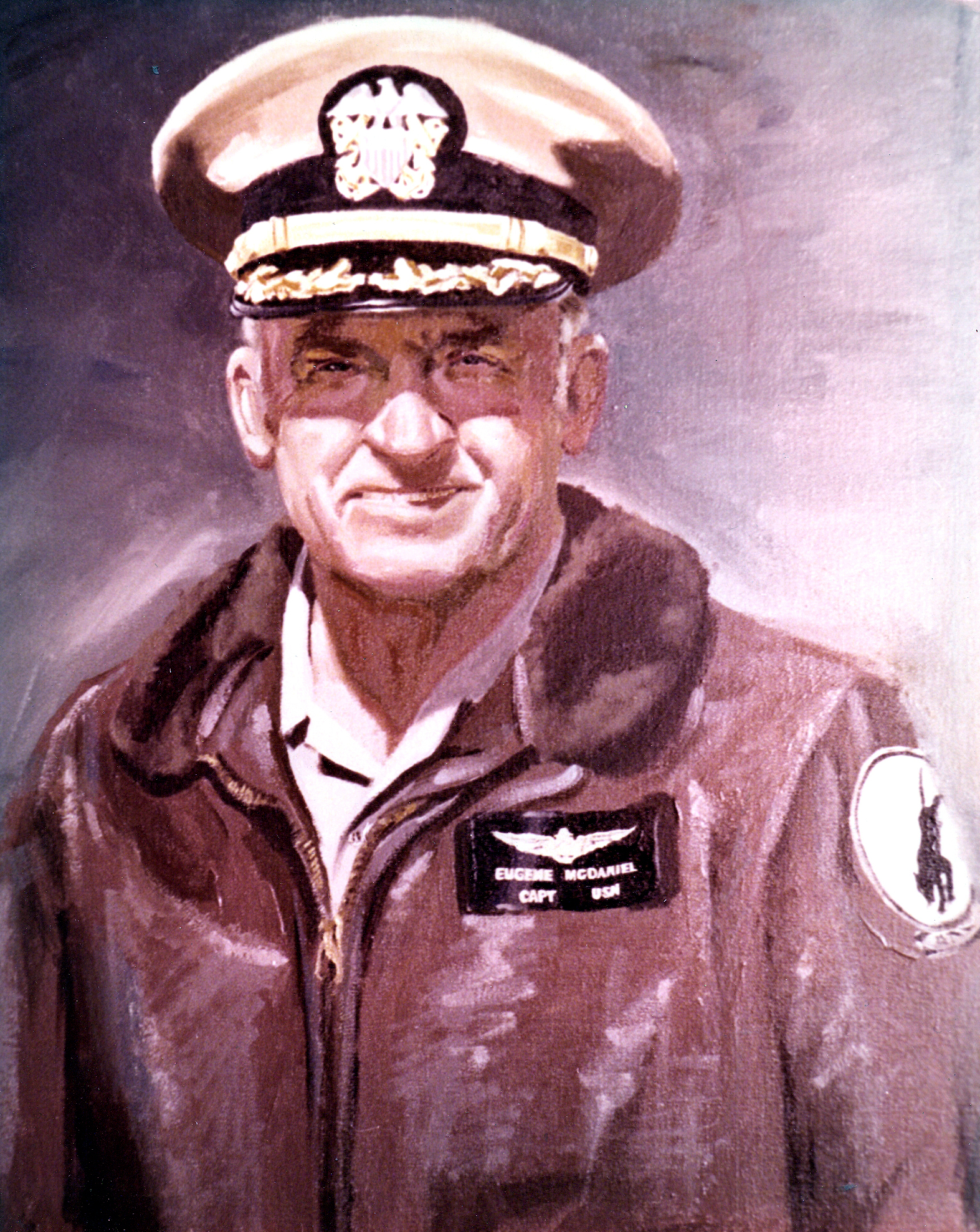
- Portrait of McDaniel, painted by Gerard Bianco
- Born: Eugene Barker McDaniel; September 27, 1931; Kinston, North Carolina, U.S.
- Died: August 7, 2026 (aged 94); Mount Vernon, Virginia, U.S.
- Spouse: Dorothy Howard
- Military career
- Allegiance: United States of America
- Branch: United States Navy
- Service years: 1955 – 1982
- Rank: Captain
- Nickname: Red (for his hair color)
- Service number: 0-1319 / 4751406
- Unit: VA-35 on USS Enterprise (CVN-65)
- Commands: USS Niagara Falls (AFS-3); USS Lexington (CV-16)
- Conflicts: Vietnam War; Cold War
- Awards: Navy Cross Silver Star Medal (2) Legion of Merit (2) DFC Bronze Star Medal Purple Heart (2)

Eugene Barker McDaniel (September 27, 1931 – August 7, 2026) was a United States Navy captain, Naval Aviator and a prisoner of war during the Vietnam War. He was released from captivity on March 4, 1973, after six years of confinement.

== Background ==
McDaniel was born on September 27, 1931, to Willard and Helen McDaniel, poor tobacco sharecroppers in North Carolina. He was the eldest of eight children. In high school, he was heavily involved in athletics and played basketball and baseball. He had an offer to play baseball professionally, but his father insisted that McDaniel attend college, having only finished 4th grade himself. McDaniel attended Campbell Junior College in Buies Creek, North Carolina, on an athletic scholarship. He met his wife Dorothy Howard, the daughter of a Baptist minister, at Campbell and married her six years later. Following Campbell, McDaniel attended Elon College in Elon, North Carolina, and enlisted in the Navy. He became interested in aviation since he felt it complemented his athletic mindset. He attended flight school in Corpus Christi, Texas, then moved to Virginia Beach, Virginia. He had three children with Dorothy prior to his capture in Vietnam, Mike, David and Leslie.

== Navy career ==
McDaniel began US Navy active duty on March 15, 1955 and was designated a Naval Aviator on October 1, 1956, after completing training. From 1956 to 1960, he was a Special Weapons Delivery Instructor with VA-25 and VA-65, which was equipped with the Douglas A-1 Skyraider at the time. From 1961 to 1963, he was a Replacement Air Group (RAG) Flight Instructor with VA-42. From 1963 to 1965, McDaniel was with USS Independence as an assistant Carrier Air Traffic Control (CATC) after completing training for Air Intercept Controller (AIC) / Carrier Controlled Approach (CCA) in Glynco, Georgia.

He deployed on a combat tour to Vietnam as Maintenance Officer with VA-35 aboard USS Enterprise starting in November 1966. He flew 81 combat missions up to May 1967. McDaniel was shot down while flying an A-6A Intruder aircraft (buno 152594) on May 19, 1967, during an Alpha strike on Văn Điển, south of Hanoi, in North Vietnam during Operation Rolling Thunder. He was listed as "missing in action" until the Hanoi government acknowledged that he was being held prisoner in 1970. His bombardier-navigator, James Kelly Patterson, also ejected from the A-6, but as of 2014, it was presumed that Patterson was captured and died at some point later.

McDaniel was tortured while in captivity during the Vietnam War. The most severe torture resulted from his active role in camp communications during an organized escape attempt by his fellow prisoners in June 1969. During that time McDaniel was detained in isolation for more than two weeks, severely beaten, bound with ropes resulting in a compound fracture of his arm, deprived of sleep and subjected to electrical shock. Even though he was not directly involved in planning the escape attempt, he refused to give his torturers the names of the organizers and accepted responsibility for the attempt himself. He is the author of Scars and Stripes, a book telling about his six years of captivity in North Vietnam, with much of it in Hỏa Lò Prison, known as the Hanoi Hilton.

He was released from captivity on March 4, 1973, after 6 years of captivity and spent much of 1973 attached to Portsmouth Naval Hospital, Portsmouth, Virginia. When McDaniel returned home from Vietnam, he was awarded the Navy's second highest award for bravery, the Navy Cross. Among his other military decorations are two Silver Stars, the Legion of Merit with Combat "V", the Distinguished Flying Cross, three Bronze Stars with Combat "V", and two Purple Hearts for wounds received while in captivity.

Captain McDaniel resumed active duty and served as Commanding Officer of USS Niagara Falls from June 21, 1975, to September 10, 1976, and Commanding Officer of the aircraft carrier USS Lexington from May 25, 1977, to November 30, 1978. Under his command, Lexington experienced no serious accidents while accomplishing more than 20,000 carrier landings. While Captain McDaniel was commander of the Lexington, Gerard Bianco was commissioned by the Navy to go aboard and paint the most exciting thing he found, which turned out to be Captain McDaniel. McDaniel's portrait hangs in the National Museum of the United States Navy in Washington, D.C.

He served as Director of Navy/Marine Corps Liaison to the United States House of Representatives from 1979 to 1981. In this capacity, Captain McDaniel worked daily with Congress on national defense planning and provided legislators with information vital to the strategic development of Navy forces throughout the world. He retired from the Navy on January 6, 1982.

== Post-Navy career ==
McDaniel subsequently became involved in the Vietnam War POW/MIA issue, leading to a "grassroots campaign to focus attention on American servicemen still missing in Southeast Asia."

In 1982, McDaniel ran on the Republican ticket against Democratic incumbent Charles Orville Whitley to represent North Carolina's 3rd congressional district. McDaniel was defeated 63% to 36% in that election.

In 1988, McDaniel went on a speaking tour of US Navy commands to encourage military personnel to register to vote and discussing his experiences as a POW.

He was President of the American Defense Institute, a non-profit organization headquartered in Washington, D.C. He founded ADI to increase public awareness of the need for a strong national defense.

In 2010, McDaniel was on a speaking tour for US Navy officers and also speaking at returning soldier and sailor workshops.

McDaniel was present at the inactivation ceremony for USS Enterprise (CVN-65) on December 1, 2012, at the Norfolk Naval Base. It was the first time he had returned to the ship after launching from her deck in his A-6A Intruder and being shot down and captured on May 19, 1967.

McDaniel died from heart failure on August 7, 2026, at the age of 94.

== Awards and honors ==
- Navy Cross for his time in captivity June 14–29, 1969.
- 2× Silver Star one for May 21–24, 1967 and a second for September 1967.
- 2× Legion of Merit one with Combat "V" for his time in captivity and one without for his service as Director of the House of Representatives Office of Legislative Affairs from December 1978 through June 1981.
- Distinguished Flying Cross for heroism and extraordinary achievement while participating in aerial flight on April 10, 1967.
- 8× Air Medal (Individual)
- 4× Air Medal (Strike/Flight)
- 3× Bronze Star Medal with Combat "V"
- 2× Purple Heart
- Prisoner of War Medal, May 19, 1967 – March 4, 1973.
- American Patriots Medal, from the Freedoms Foundation of Valley Forge, Pennsylvania, February 1979.

=== Navy Cross Citation ===
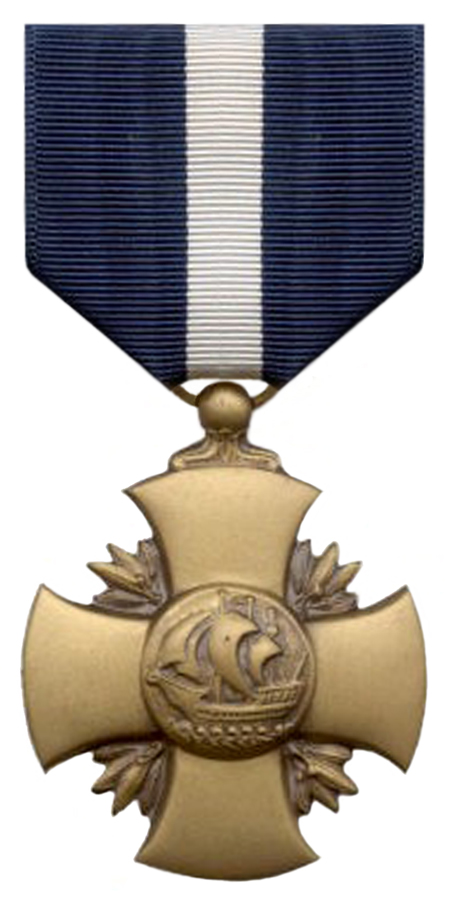
Navy Cross

For his actions in captivity from 14–29 June 1969 he received the Navy Cross with the following citation:

The President of the United States of America takes pleasure in presenting the Navy Cross to Captain Eugene Barker McDaniel (NSN: 0-1319/4751406), United States Navy, for extraordinary heroism as a Prisoner of War (POW) in North Vietnam from 14 June to 29 June 1969. Due to an unsuccessful escape attempt by two of his fellow prisoners, his captors launched a vicious round of torture to single out the senior POW's who were to blame for the breakout. During these torture sessions a confession led to exposing him as the communications link between the senior ranking officer of the main prison camp and the adjacent annex detachment. He accepted the responsibility for the escape and fabricated a story of his own planned escape. After interrogation, the enemy severely tortured him in their attempt to obtain information about the organization and policies of the American POW's in the camp. Under the most adverse of conditions, he heroically resisted these cruelties and never divulged the information demanded by the North Vietnamese. His exemplary courage, maximum resistance, and aggressiveness in the face of the enemy reflected great credit upon himself and upheld the highest traditions of the Naval Service and the United States Armed Forces.

— Navy Department Board of Decorations and Medals

== Bibliography ==
- McDaniel, Eugene B; Johnson, James L (1975). Before Honor. Philadelphia: A. J. Holman Co. ISBN 0-87981-046-7.
- McDaniel, Eugene B; Johnson, James L (2012). Scars and Stripes: The True Story of One Man's Courage Facing Death as a POW in Vietnam. Washington, D.C.: WND Books. p. 159. ISBN 978-1-936488-47-6.
