= Silver Slipper (Las Vegas) =

Former casino in Winchester, Nevada

- Location within Las Vegas Strip Location within Nevada
- Interactive map of Silver Slipper
- Location: Winchester, Nevada; 3100 South Las Vegas Boulevard; 36°7′50″N 115°10′0″W
- Opened: September 1, 1950
- Closed: November 28, 1988; 37 years ago
- Theme: Old West
- Permanent shows: Minsky's Burlesque (1965–1967); Wonderful World of Burlesque (1968–1973); Boy-lesque (1977–1988)
- Casino type: Land
- Owner: R.E. “Griff” Griffith (first owner); Margaret Elardi (final owner)
- Architect: Martin Stern Jr. Homer Rissman
- Previous names: Golden Slipper
- Renovated in: 1966

The Silver Slipper was a casino on the Las Vegas Strip in Winchester, Nevada. It opened on September 1, 1950. It was built just north of the Frontier hotel-casino, and they both shared the same ownership, although the Silver Slipper's gaming operations were later leased out. Businessman Howard Hughes leased the casino from 1968 until his death in 1976.

The Silver Slipper closed on November 28, 1988, amid an ownership change. It was demolished shortly thereafter to become a parking lot for the Frontier, with plans to eventually rebuild the Silver Slipper as a high-rise hotel and casino, although this did not pan out. The Frontier was demolished in 2007, for another resort project that was ultimately canceled as well. The Frontier and Silver Slipper sites remain vacant as of 2024.

The Silver Slipper was known for its neon slipper, which was preserved after the casino's closure. It stands 12 feet and features more than 900 bulbs. The slipper was installed along North Las Vegas Boulevard in 2009.

== History ==
=== Early years ===
The Silver Slipper was built as part of the Last Frontier Village, a western-themed attraction at the Hotel Last Frontier, and owned by R.E. “Griff” Griffith. The Silver Slipper, built just north of the Frontier hotel, opened on September 1, 1950. It was originally known as the Golden Slipper. Shortly after opening, Guy McAfee of the Golden Nugget hotel-casino threatened to sue the Golden Slipper, alleging similarities in design and name. The Golden Slipper agreed to stop using the name, and was rebranded the Silver Slipper by the end of 1950, having bought the rights to that name from a bar and casino located on Boulder Highway.

The Silver Slipper was a two-story, Old West-themed casino. It featured various games, including a Big Six wheel, craps, Farobank, poker, and roulette. A convention hall, located on the second floor, was the largest in the state. The casino would later become known for featuring a collection of artwork by Julian Ritter.

The Silver Slipper was originally operated by the Frontier ownership group, before being leased out in 1956. In April 1964, the casino became the first in Nevada to be shut down on cheating charges. Agents of the Nevada Gaming Control Board raided the Silver Slipper for using "flat" dice. Although its table games were shut down, the state allowed the slot machines to continue operating. The casino was closed entirely on May 8, 1964, by the Internal Revenue Service (IRS), which alleged that $70,000 in taxes were owed. Later that month, the Nevada Gaming Commission found the casino's management guilty of using flat dice and revoked their gaming license.

The Silver Slipper entered foreclosure in January 1965, but plans by the IRS to sell it were halted after the Frontier owners filed suit, noting that they owned the land and structure. Shelam Inc., a group led by local gambler Sam Diamond, soon took over the casino's lease, reopening the property on October 20, 1965. A $500,000 expansion project was underway in 1966. It included exterior remodeling and a larger casino. The project was designed by Martin Stern Jr. and Homer Rissman.

=== Hughes involvement and later years ===
Businessman Howard Hughes took over the Silver Slipper's gaming operations in 1968, leasing the rights from Shelam for $5.3 million. Hughes had also purchased the Frontier by that point. The Silver Slipper was the only casino that Hughes held personally; the others were owned by Hughes Tool Company, which later became Summa Corporation. Because his company had government contracts, it could not donate to political candidates. Hughes instead withdrew funds from the Silver Slipper for political contributions.

In 1970, the Silver Slipper became the first casino on the Las Vegas Strip to hire female table dealers.

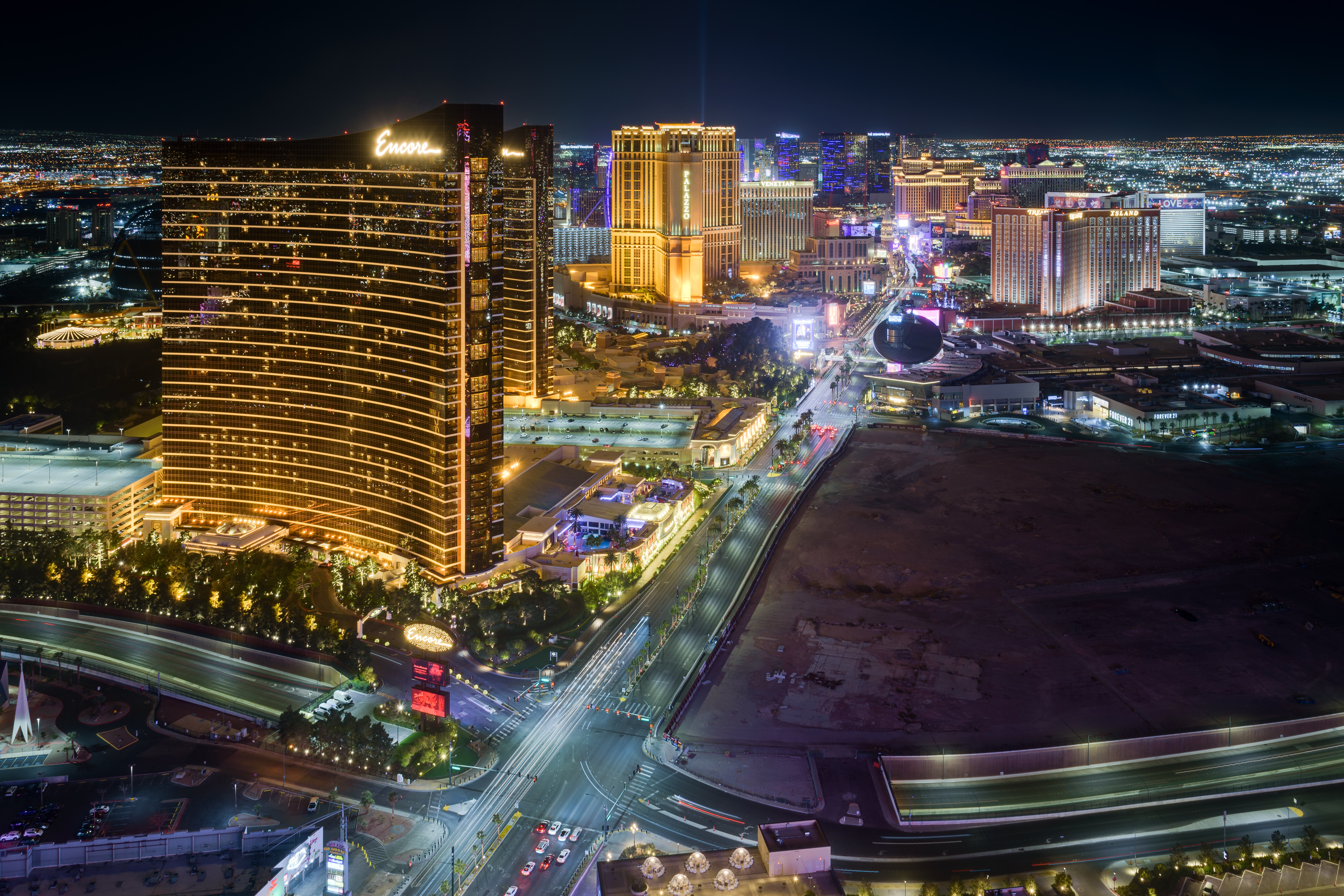
The former Frontier and Silver Slipper sites (right) in 2023. The latter's foundation is visible at the lower left of the vacant lot.

Summa Corporation attempted to buy the Silver Slipper out of its lease in 1973. However, the ownership group (the former Frontier owners) contended that the option to purchase was assigned to Hughes only, not his company. The group also stated that a $100,000 payment, one of the conditions on the option, was never made. The owners later stated that the purchase option applied to Shelam and should not have been transferred to another lessee. Litigation ensued starting in 1974, when the owners filed a suit against Hughes, alleging he was behind on a year's worth of rent. They sought to evict Hughes and take control of the Silver Slipper. Hughes died in 1976, and Summa ultimately took ownership of the casino.

In its final years, the casino employed approximately 600 workers. In December 1987, Summa agreed to sell the Frontier and the Silver Slipper – the last of Hughes' Las Vegas gaming properties – to casino owner Margaret Elardi. Summa continued operating the Silver Slipper until its closure on November 28, 1988, at which point Elardi took over the property. Demolition was underway the following month. Elardi redeveloped the land as a parking lot for the Frontier, and planned to eventually construct a new Silver Slipper on the site, in the form of a high-rise hotel-casino. However, this project did not pan out.

The Frontier would be sold several times, and eventually demolished in 2007, for a new resort project that would also be canceled. As of 2024, the Frontier and Silver Slipper sites remain vacant; the latter is still under the ownership of the Elardi family.

== Signage ==
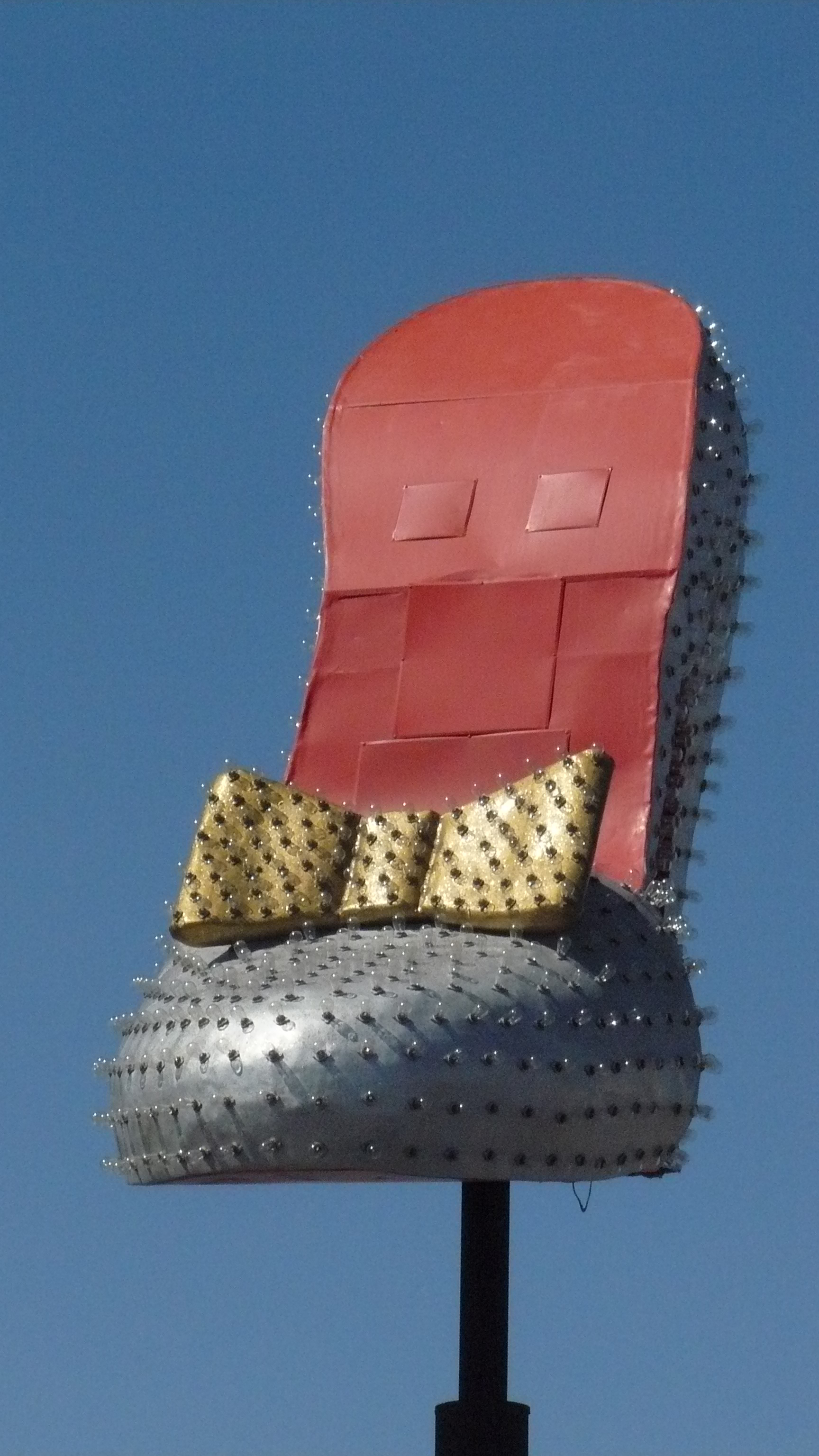
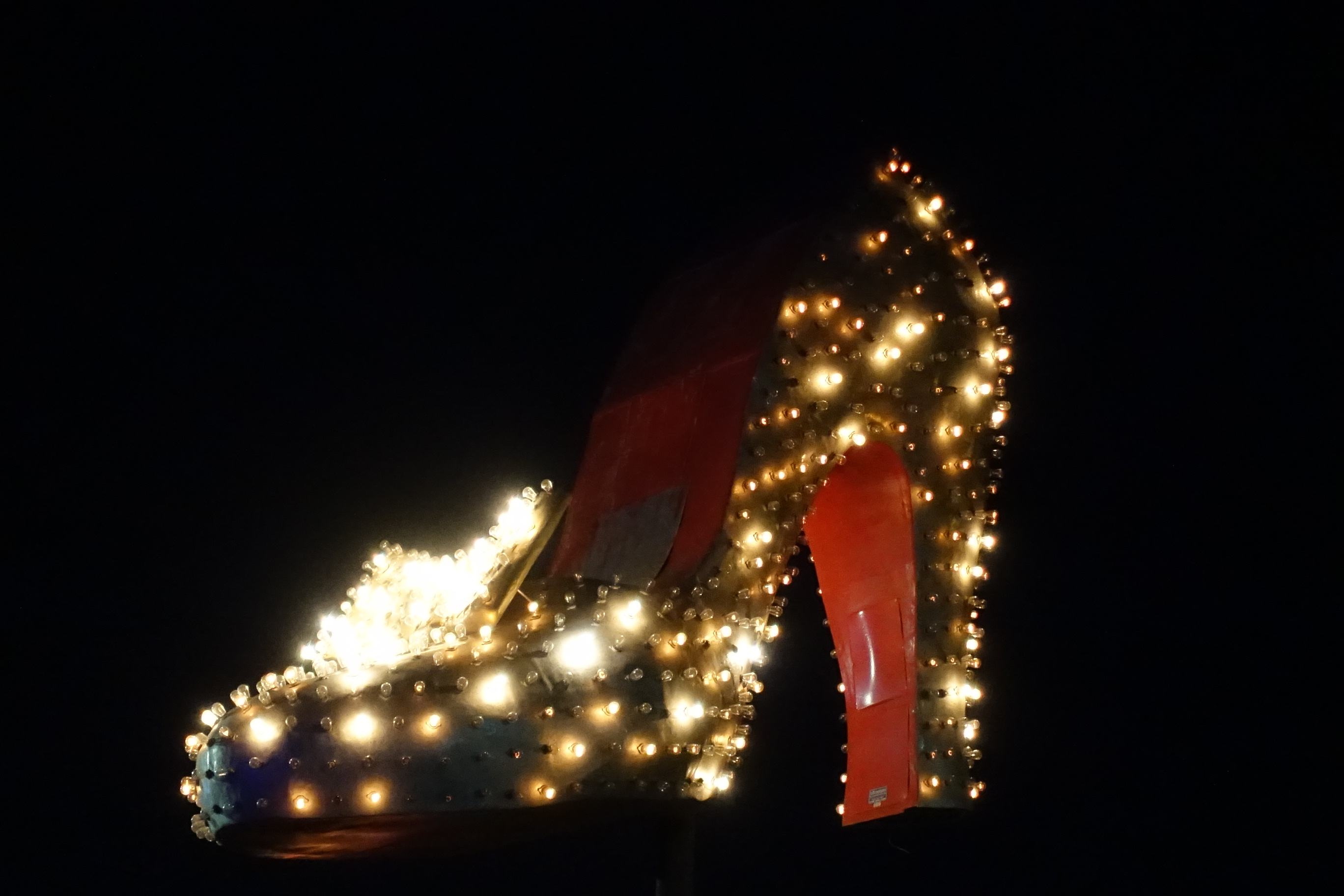
The neon slipper after its 2009 restoration

The casino was known for having a large, rotating neon slipper, designed by Jack Larsen Sr. and manufactured by YESCO. It is 12 feet high and includes 900 bulbs, with an additional 80 built into a bow that covers the toe area.

The slipper was installed in 1954 or 1955, originally on the casino rooftop. The casino is briefly featured in the 1957 film The Amazing Colossal Man, in which a man grows to gargantuan height and travels through Las Vegas, at one point dismantling the slipper. In 1965, the slipper was moved to a sign directly alongside the Strip.

=== Myths ===
In 1968, Hughes was living in a penthouse at his Desert Inn resort, located across the street. Persistent, false stories claim that Hughes took over the Silver Slipper specifically because of its neon slipper. These stories originated with a 1967 article by columnist Earl Wilson, who wrote:

[Hughes] found the lights of the Silver Slipper, across the Strip, interfered with his sleep. Associates say he had them request the Silver Slipper to dim its lights. They refused. His emissaries say he has instructed them to negotiate for the purchase of the Slipper so it will no longer interfere with his sleep.

Another story is that the reclusive Hughes was paranoid about photographers hiding in the toe area of the slipper in order to snap photos of him in his penthouse. As such, he purportedly wanted the slipper's rotating mechanism disabled and had it filled with concrete. In reality, Hughes had kept his drapes closed at all times, which would have prevented any bright lights or photographers from bothering him. Hughes himself never wrote of the neon slipper in his extensive archive of memos, and concrete was never found in the rotating mechanism.

=== Preservation ===
After the casino closed, the slipper was acquired by the city's Neon Museum for preservation. At some point during its years in storage, singer Wayne Newton posed with the slipper for a promotional shoot. One of his feet broke through the toe area of the slipper as he stepped onto it, a result of its age.

In 2009, the slipper was installed on a median along North Las Vegas Boulevard, in front of the Neon Museum. The slipper had undergone restoration, which included new wiring and paint, as well as repair work to the toe area. In 2018, the museum changed the slipper's sole and insole paint from red to blue, matching the original color scheme according to early photographs.

Another sign, a neon arch that read "free parking", was also preserved after the casino's closure. It was purchased by the Exchange Club casino in Beatty, Nevada, and was relocated there to mark its parking lot, before being toppled by strong wind in 2018.

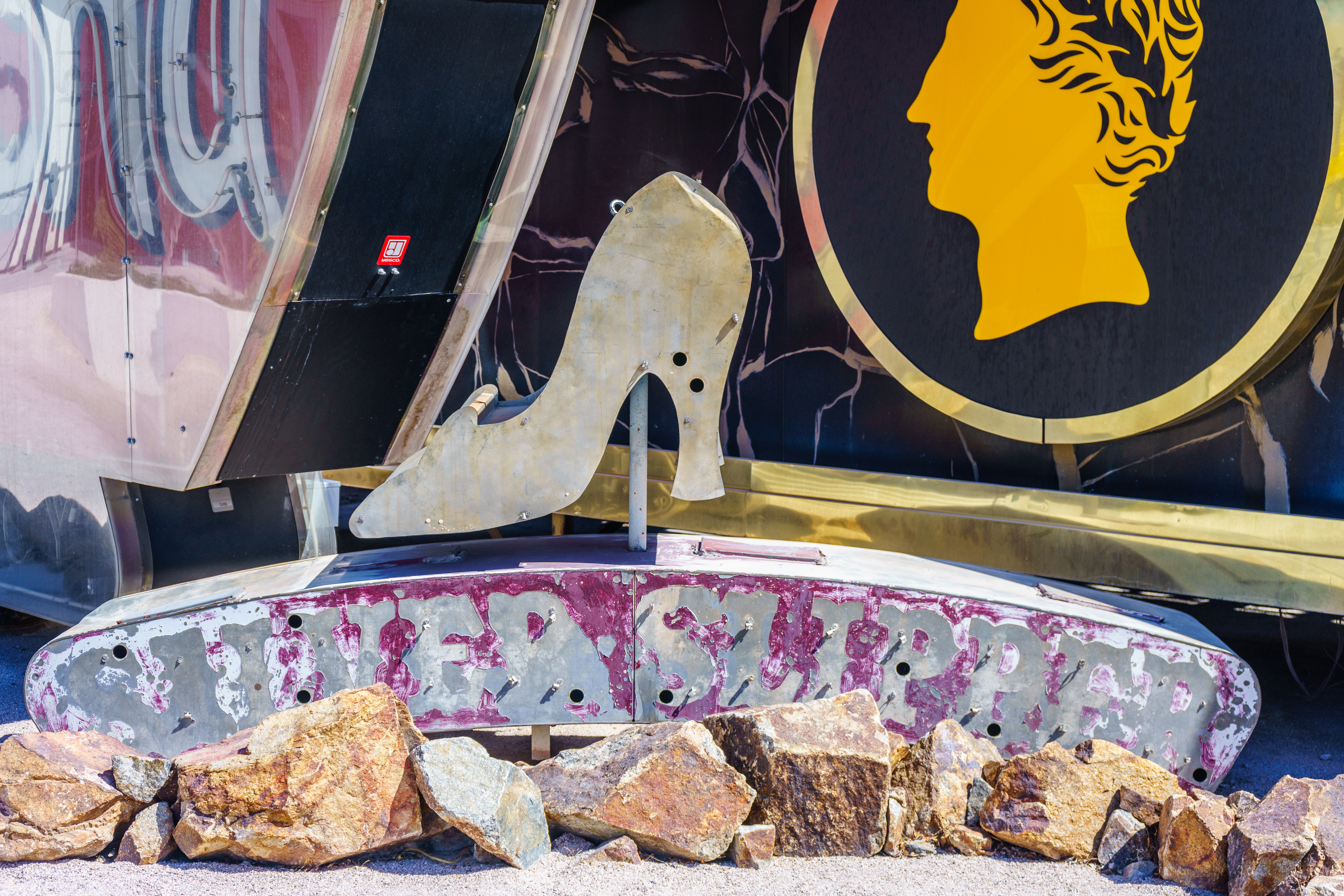
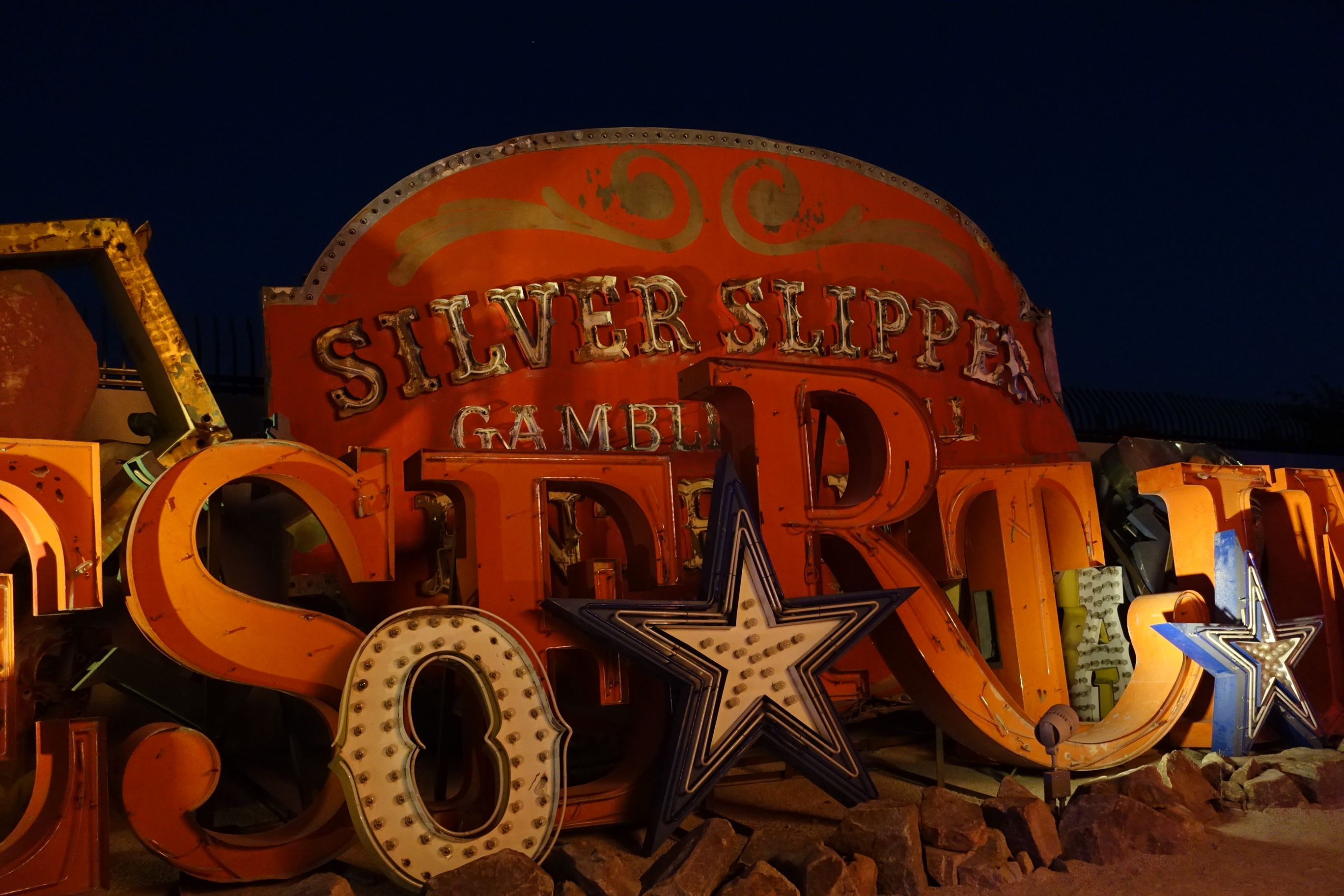
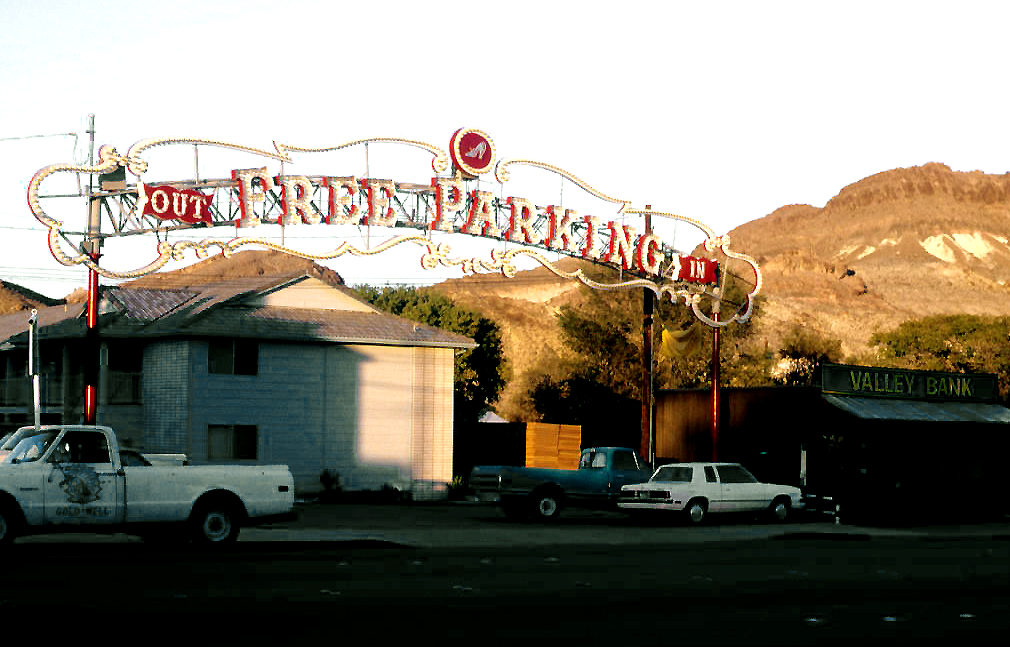
Other Silver Slipper signs at the Neon Museum, 2017; and the "free parking" sign in Beatty, 1989

== Live entertainment ==
Comedian Hank Henry was the first performer and a frequent entertainer at the Silver Slipper during the 1950s. Henry's revue turned into the Silver Slipper Stock Co. which over 14 years helped expand the Slipper and brought in celebrity audiences. Famous names appearing in the sketches included Buster Keaton, Bela Lugosi, Billy Barty, Billy Gilbert, Gogi Grant, Barbara McNair and Slapsy Maxie Rosenbloom. Transgender singer Christine Jorgensen also performed there in 1955. Other entertainers included singers Fifi D'Orsay, Nellie Lutcher and Rusty Draper. A weekly boxing series, Strip Fight of the Week, took place at the Silver Slipper from the 1960s to 1982.

A 400-seat showroom, the Gaiety Theatre, opened on August 3, 1966. Another venue, the Red Garter Lounge, was also added. The casino hosted several burlesque shows, including Minsky's Burlesque (1965–1967), and Wonderful World of Burlesque (1968–1973).

Drag queen Kenny Kerr opened a show, titled Boy-lesque, at the theater in 1977. It featured a variety of female impersonators, including Kerr, who portrayed singers such as Barbra Streisand and Cher. The show was a hit for the Silver Slipper, and continued running for the next 11 years, up until the casino's closure.
