= The Burial of the Count of Orgaz =

Painting by El Greco

- El Entierro del Conde de Orgaz (Spanish)
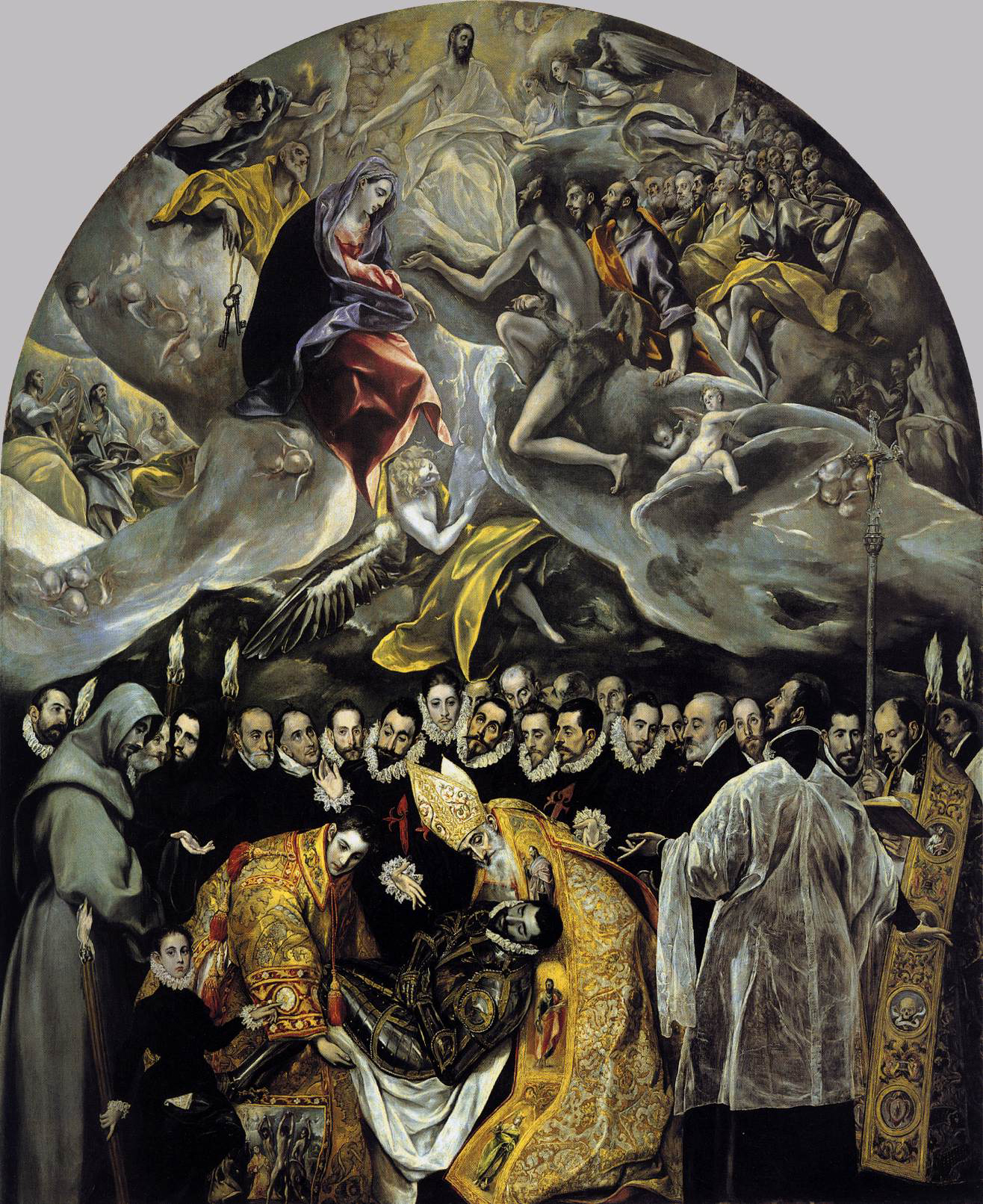
- Artist: El Greco
- Year: 1586
- Medium: Oil on canvas
- Dimensions: 480 cm × 360 cm (190 in × 140 in)
- Location: Iglesia de Santo Tomé, Toledo

The Burial of the Count of Orgaz (Spanish: El Entierro del Conde de Orgaz) is a 1586 painting by El Greco, a prominent Renaissance painter, sculptor, and architect of Greek origin. Widely considered among his finest works, it illustrates a popular local legend of his time. An exceptionally large painting, it is divided into two sections, heavenly above and terrestrial below, but it gives little impression of duality, since the upper and lower sections are brought together compositionally.

The painting has been lauded by art scholars, characterized, inter alia, as "one of the most truthful pages in the history of Spain", as a masterpiece of Western art and of late Mannerism, and as the epitome of Greco's artistic style.

== Theme ==
The theme of the painting is inspired by a legend of the early fourteenth century. In 1323, a certain Don Gonzalo Ruiz de Toledo, mayor of the town of Orgaz, died (his family later received the title of Count, by which he is generally and posthumously known). Don Gonzalo Ruiz de Toledo was a descendant of the noble Palaiologos family, which produced the last ruling dynasty of the Byzantine Empire. A pious caballero, the Count of Orgaz was also a philanthropist, who, among other charitable acts, left a sum of money for the enlargement and adornment of the church of Santo Tomé (El Greco's parish church), where he wanted to be buried.

According to the legend, at the time the Count was buried, Saint Stephen and Saint Augustine descended in person from the heavens and buried him with their own hands in front of the dazzled eyes of those present. The event is depicted in the painting, with every detail of the work's subject described in the contract signed between Greco and the Church. The miracle is also mentioned in the Latin epitaphian inscription, set into the wall below the painting. Although Greco abided by the terms of the contract, he introduced some elements which "modernized" the legend, such as a series of features attributed to a 16th-century customary funeral procession, the vestments of the two saints, as well as the depiction of eminent Toledan figures of his time. The "modernization" of the legend serves the didactic purpose of the painting, which, in accord with the Counter-Reformation doctrines, stresses the importance of both the veneration of saints and of good deeds for the salvation of the soul.

The Burial of the Count of Orgaz is located within the Church of Santo Tomé in Toledo, Spain.

== History ==
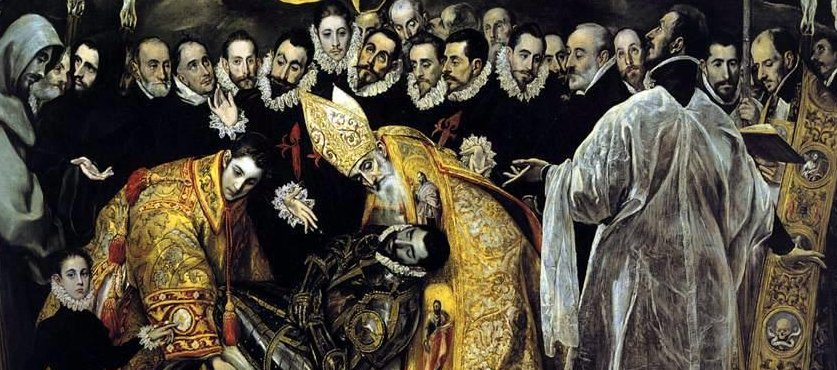
Detail of the painting

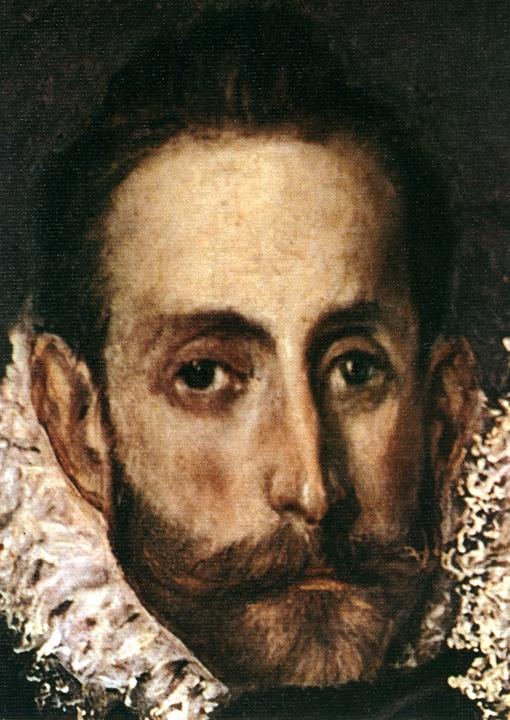
Detail of the painting, showing El Greco

The painting was commissioned by Andrés Núñez, the parish priest of Santo Tomé, for the side-chapel of the Virgin of the church of Santo Tomé. Núñez, who had initiated a project to refurbish the Count's burial chapel, is portrayed in the painting reading (on the right of the lower part of the composition). The painting's commission was the last step in the priest's plan to glorify the parish.

Signed on 18 March 1586, the contract between Núñez and El Greco laid down specific iconographic demands, stipulated that the artist would pay for the materials, and provided for the completion of the work by Christmas 1587. Greco must have worked at a frantic pace, and finished the painting between late 1587 and the spring of 1588. A long debate between the priests and the painter followed in relation to the value of the latter's work, for which the contract stipulated that it would be determined by appraisal. Initially intransigent, Greco eventually compromised and settled for the lower first "expert estimate", agreeing to receive 13,200 reales.

Already in 1588, people were flocking to Santo Tomé to see the painting. This immediate popular reception was mainly due to the realistic portrayal of the notable men of Toledo of the time. It was the custom for the eminent and noble men of the town to assist the burial of the noble-born, and it was stipulated in the contract that the scene should be represented in this manner.

El Greco would pay homage to the aristocracy of the spirit, the clergy, the jurists, the poets and the scholars, who honored him and his art with their esteem, by immortalizing them in the painting. The Burial of the Count of Orgaz has been admired not only for its art, but also because it is a gallery of portraits of some of the most important personalities of that time in Toledo. In 1612, Francisco de Pisa wrote: "The people of our city never grow tired, because [...] there are realistic portraits of many notable men of our times."

== Analysis of the painting ==
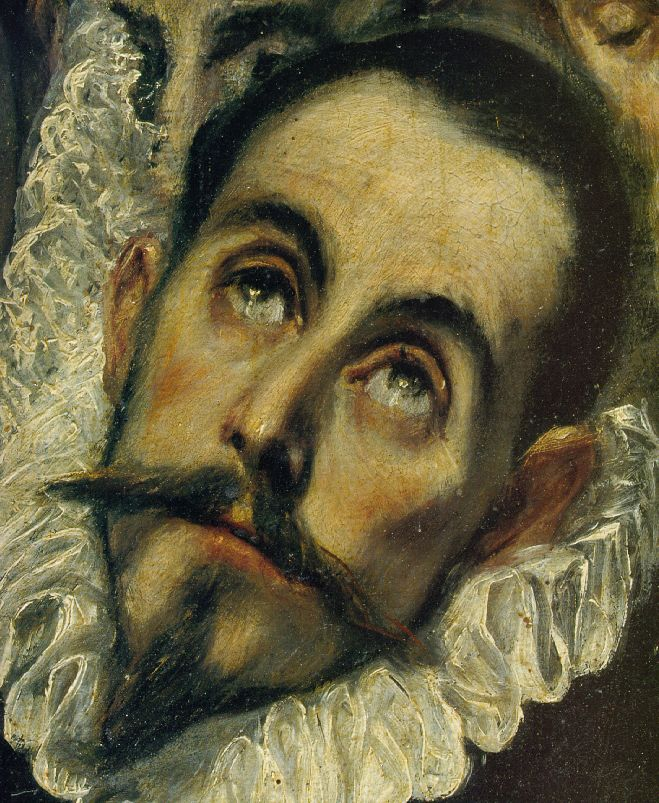
Detail of the painting.

According to the terms stipulated in the contract and the prevailing scholarly approach, the painting is divided into two zones, juxtaposing the earthly with the heavenly world, which are brought together compositionally (e.g., by the standing figures, by their varied participation in the earthly and heavenly event, by the torches, cross etc.). Franz Philipp emphasizes the element of the assumption of the soul (assumptio animae), and argues that the work should be considered as tripartite: the central division of the painting is occupied by the assumptio animae, in the form of a newborn, "ethereal" baby. Augustine's perception of the soul and its ascent, which evolved from a Neoplatonic basis, is a possible inspiration for the painter's imagery of assumptio animae. Greco's way of thematically and artistically linking the upper with the lower zone of the painting has been characterized by art scholars as ingenious, and as further accomplishing the main message of the painting, that veneration and good works lead to salvation.

In the upper part, the heavenly one, the clouds have parted to receive the "righteous man" in Paradise. Heaven is evoked by swirling icy clouds, semiabstract in their shape, and the saints are tall and phantomlike. Christ, clad in white and in glory, is a radiance of light, and the crowning point of the triangle formed by the figures of the Madonna and Saint John the Baptist in the traditional Orthodox composition of the Deesis. These three central figures of heavenly glory are surrounded by apostles, martyrs, Biblical figures (including Moses, Noah and David) as well as Philip II of Spain, though he was still alive. The "righteous" Philip II is spiritually united with Christ and the heavenly creatures in a City of God as conceived by Augustine. The heavenly and terrestrial land both blend together in an amazing fashion, but there is little sense of duality. In the central part of the composition, an angel powerfully pushes the nascent soul upwards, a movement interpreted once again as a visualization of the Counter-Reformation teaching of salvation.

The scene of the miracle is depicted in the lower part of the composition, in the terrestrial section, where all is normal as regards the scale and proportions of the figures. Saint Augustine, bearing the characteristics of Gaspar de Quiroga y Vela, the Archbishop of Toledo, and Saint Stephen, in golden and red vestments respectively, bend reverently over the body of the count, who is clad in magnificent armor that reflects the yellow and reds of the other figures. The armor is contemporary with Greco's time, and inspired by the ceremonial military dress of the Spanish royals as depicted in Titian's portraits. The noblemen contemplate the event in a detached and restrained manner. Their subdued composure has been interpreted either as another visual element of the didactic purpose of the painting under the Counter-Reformation influence or as an expression of the Byzantine origins of Greco's art. The young boy at the left is El Greco's son, Jorge Manuel; on a handkerchief in his pocket is inscribed the artist's signature and the date 1578, the year of the boy's birth. Jorge Manuel's inclusion emphasizes the didactic purpose of the painting: the boy occupies a prominent position close to the spectator's view, directing the latter with his pointing finger. The artist himself can be recognised directly above the raised hand of a knight of the Order of Santiago.

The painting has a chromatic harmony that is very rich, expressive and radiant. On the black mourning garments of the nobles are projected the gold-embroidered vestments, thus creating an intense ceremonial character. In the heavenly space there is a predominance of transparent harmonies of iridescence and ivoried greys, which harmonize with the gilded ochres, while in the Madonna's maphorion (mantle) deep blue is closely combined with bright red. The rhetoric of the expressions, the glances and the gestural translation make the scene very moving.

== Influences ==
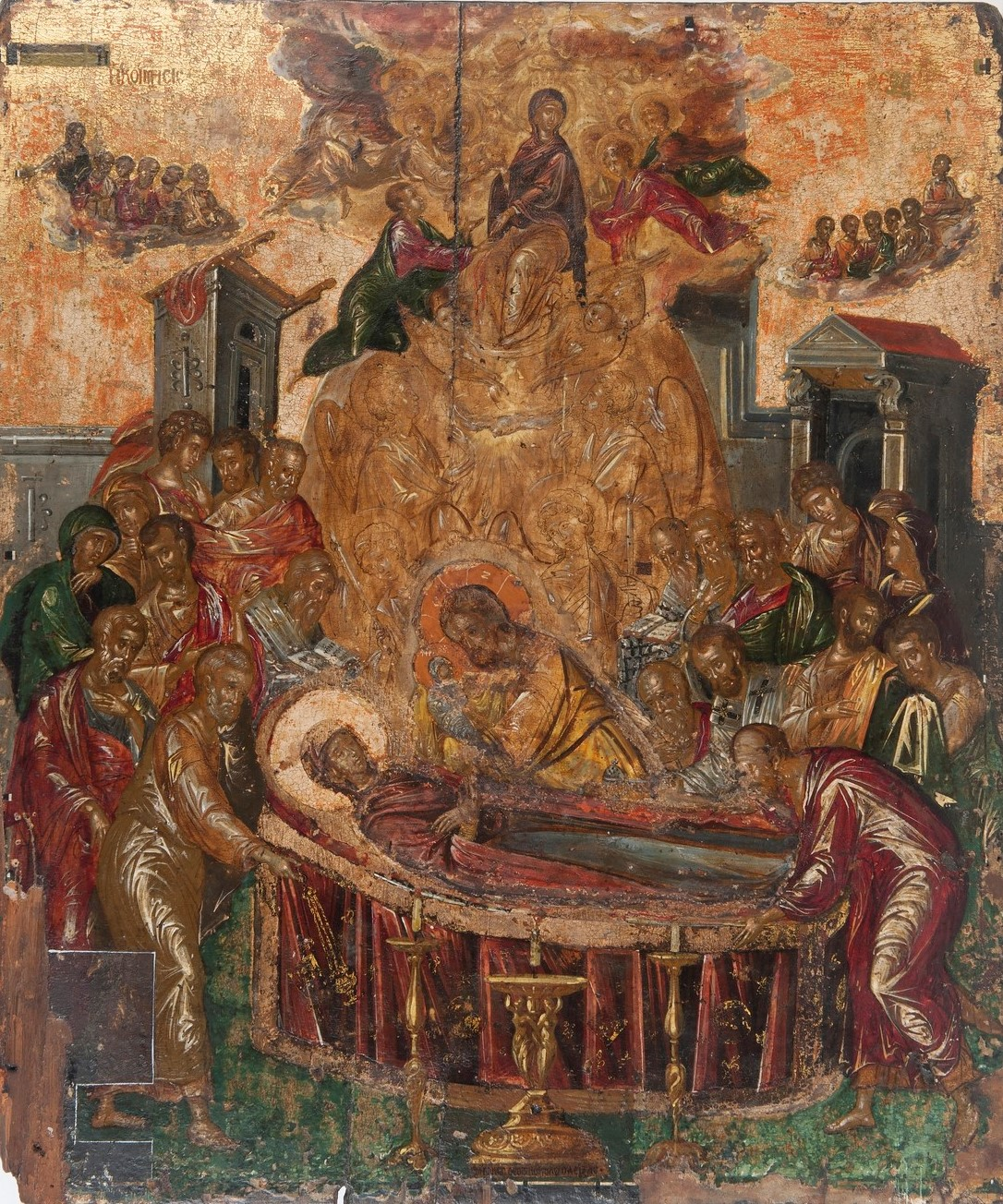
The Dormition of the Virgin. The Dormition was suggested as the compositional model for The Burial of the Count of Orgaz.

The composition of the painting has been closely related to the Byzantine iconography of the Dormition of the Mother of God. The argumentation supporting this point of view focuses on the icon of the Dormition by El Greco that was discovered in 1983 in the church of the same name in Syros. Robert Byron, according to whom the iconographic type of the Dormition was the compositional model for The Burial of the Count of Orgaz, asserts that El Greco as a genuine Byzantine painter worked throughout his life with a repertoire of components and motifs at will, depending on the narrative and expressive requirements of the art.

On the other hand, Harold Wethey rejects as "unconvincing" the view that the composition of the Burial is derived from the Dormition, "since the work is more immediately related to Italian Renaissance prototypes". In connection with its elimination of spatial depth by compressing figures into the foreground, the early Florentine Mannerists—Rosso Fiorentino, Pontormo and Parmigianino—are mentioned, as well two paintings by Tintoretto: the Crucifixion and the Resurrection of Lazarus, the latter because of the horizontal row of spectators behind the miracle. The elliptical grouping of the two saints, as they lower the dead body, is said to be closer to Titian's early Entombment than to any other work. Wethey asserts that "El Greco's Mannerist method of composition is nowhere more clearly expressed than here, where all of the action takes place in the frontal plane".

Philipp argues that the painting is heavily influenced by the contemporary Spanish funerary art, and that Greco adhered to this sepulchral artistic tradition while adapting a popular religious subject, the Entombment of Christ, to the needs of his assignment. Sarah Schroth believes that Titian's Entombment is used by Greco as a model to subtly pass his didactic message for the value of good works, and she mentions Albrecht Dürer's Adoration of the Trinity as an inspiration for the painting's bi-partite composition and the depiction of contemporary laymen in the lower, earthly zone. However, Scroth departs from Wethey's absolute rejection of the presence of Byzantine elements in the painting, and accepts Dormition as an influence for the Burial's depiction of the assumptio animae. A third work of Tintoretto, The Last Judgment, is mentioned by Schroth as a possible influence for the Burial's depiction of Gloria, since Greco wanted to incorporate elements of the funeral liturgy in the upper part of the painting.

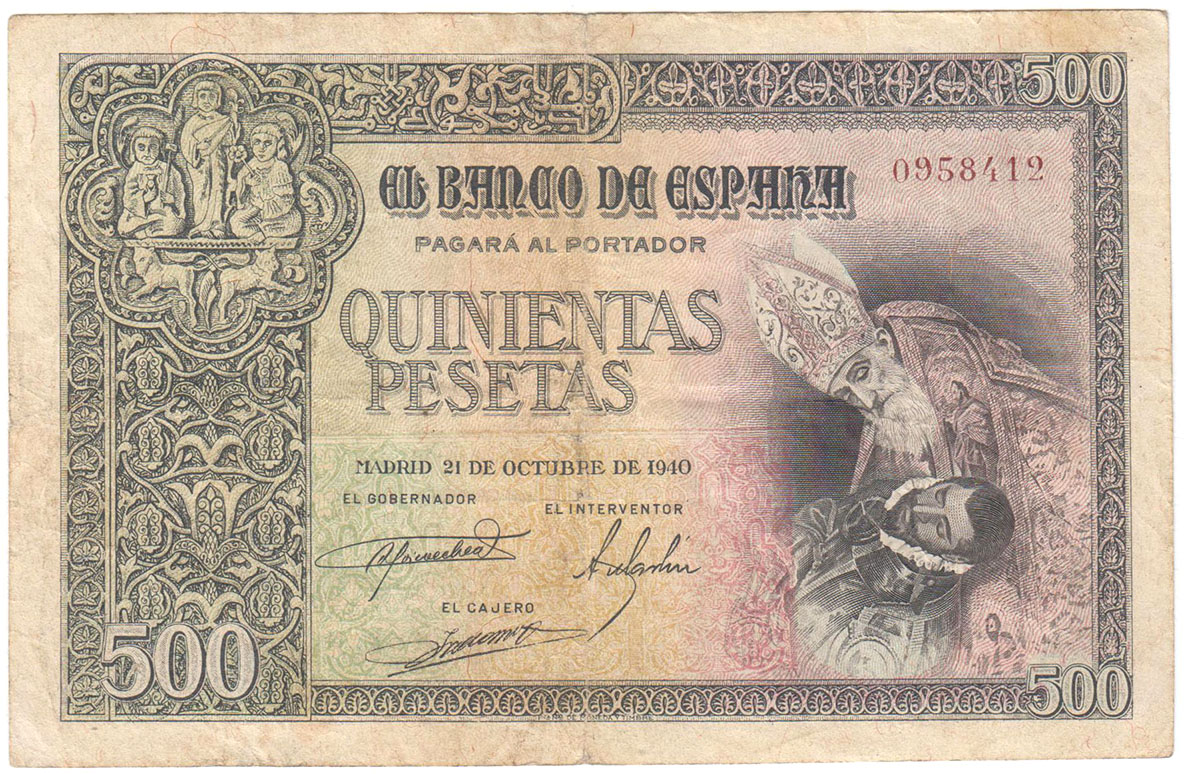
The central scene of the painting was depicted on the 1940 500 Pesetas banknote.

== Assessments ==
Regardless of their different approaches in relation to the painting's influences, the Burial is unanimously celebrated by art scholars as a masterpiece. It is also regarded as the first completely personal work of the artist, the culmination of his first ten years of creativity in Toledo, initiating his mature artistic period, as well as the processes of spiritualization and dematerialization, which will continue in his later works. According to Lambraki-Plaka, the Burial is a landmark in the artist's career: "This is where El Greco sets before us, in a highly compressed form the wisdom he has brought to his art, his knowledge, his expertise, his composite imagination and his expressive power. It is the living encyclopedia of his art without ceasing to be a masterpiece with organic continuity and entelechy".

The impressive depiction of prominent members of the Toledan society in the lower zone establishes Greco as an accomplished portraitist, with a profound knowledge of physiognomy and gestures. The chromatic harmony and the use of incredibly rich, expressive and radiant colors confirm his talent as a colorist, while the scenes depicted on the embroidered vestments reveal a gifted miniaturist. The overall composition with the innovative elements already mentioned—the peculiar synthesis of the real with the surreal, the negation of spatial depth and the impressive array of portraits—unveil all aspects of Greco's extraordinary art. Interpreting the remark of Francisco de Pisa in relation to the painting, that "there are always new things to contemplate in it", Schroth characterizes the Burial as an "inexhaustible source of instruction as well as pleasure".

In his travel diaries of the Far East, Palestine and Spain, Albert Einstein characterizes the Burial as "a magnificent painting" and "among the profoundest images I have ever seen."

== See also ==
- List of works by El Greco
- 100 Great Paintings, 1980 BBC series

== Sources ==
- Byron, Robert (October 1929). "Greco: The Epilogue to Byzantine Culture". The Burlington Magazine for Connoisseurs. 55 (319). The Burlington Magazine Publications, Ltd.: 160–174. JSTOR 864104.
- Davies, David (1984). "El Greco and the Spiritual Reform Movements in Spain". Studies in the History of Art. 13. National Gallery of Art: 57–75. JSTOR 42617963.
- Einstein, Albert (2018). Rosenkranz, Ze'ev (ed.). The Travel Diaries of Albert Einstein: The Far East, Palestine, and Spain. Princeton University Press. ISBN 978-140-0889-95-2.
- González, Demetrio Fernández (2003). ""Corpus" Documental". In Demetrio Fernández González (ed.). Gonzalo Ruiz de Toledo, Señor de Orgaz: 1323 (in Spanish). Salamanca: I.T. San Ildefonso. ISBN 9788493253585.
- Hagen, Rose-Marie; Hagen, Reiner (2003). What Great Paintings Say. Vol. 2. Taschen. ISBN 3-8228-2100-4.
- Kagan, Richard L. (1982). "El Greco and the Law". Studies in the History of Art. 11. National Gallery of Art: 79–90. JSTOR 42617942.
- Lambraki-Plaka, Marina (2014). A Tribute to El Greco for the 400th Anniversary from his Death (PDF). Athens: National Gallery – Alexandros Soutzos Museum. ISBN 978-960-7791-57-3. Archived from the original (PDF) on 2 May 2018.
- Lambraki-Plaka, Marina (1999). El Greco-The Greek. Kastaniotis. ISBN 960-03-2544-8.
- Maré, Estelle A. (1999). "The Being and Movement of the Angel in the Burial of the Count of Orgaz by EI Greco" (PDF). South African Journal of Art History. 14 (1). Art Historical Work Group of South Africa: 41–47. ISSN 0258-3542.
- Philipp, Franz (1981). "El Greco's Entombment of the Count of Orgaz and Spanish Medieval Tomb Art". Journal of the Warburg and Courtauld Institutes. 44: 76–89. doi:10.2307/751052. JSTOR 751052. S2CID 192302064.
- Schroth, Sarah (1982). "Burial of the Count of Orgaz". Studies in the History of Art. 11. National Gallery of Art: 1–17. JSTOR 42617937.
- Wethey, Harold E. (1962). El Greco and his School (Volume II). Princeton University Press. ASIN B-0007D-NZV-6.
- Wethey, Harold (2002). "Greco, El". Encyclopædia Britannica.
