= Portrait of Francisco de Pisa =

1614 painting by El Greco

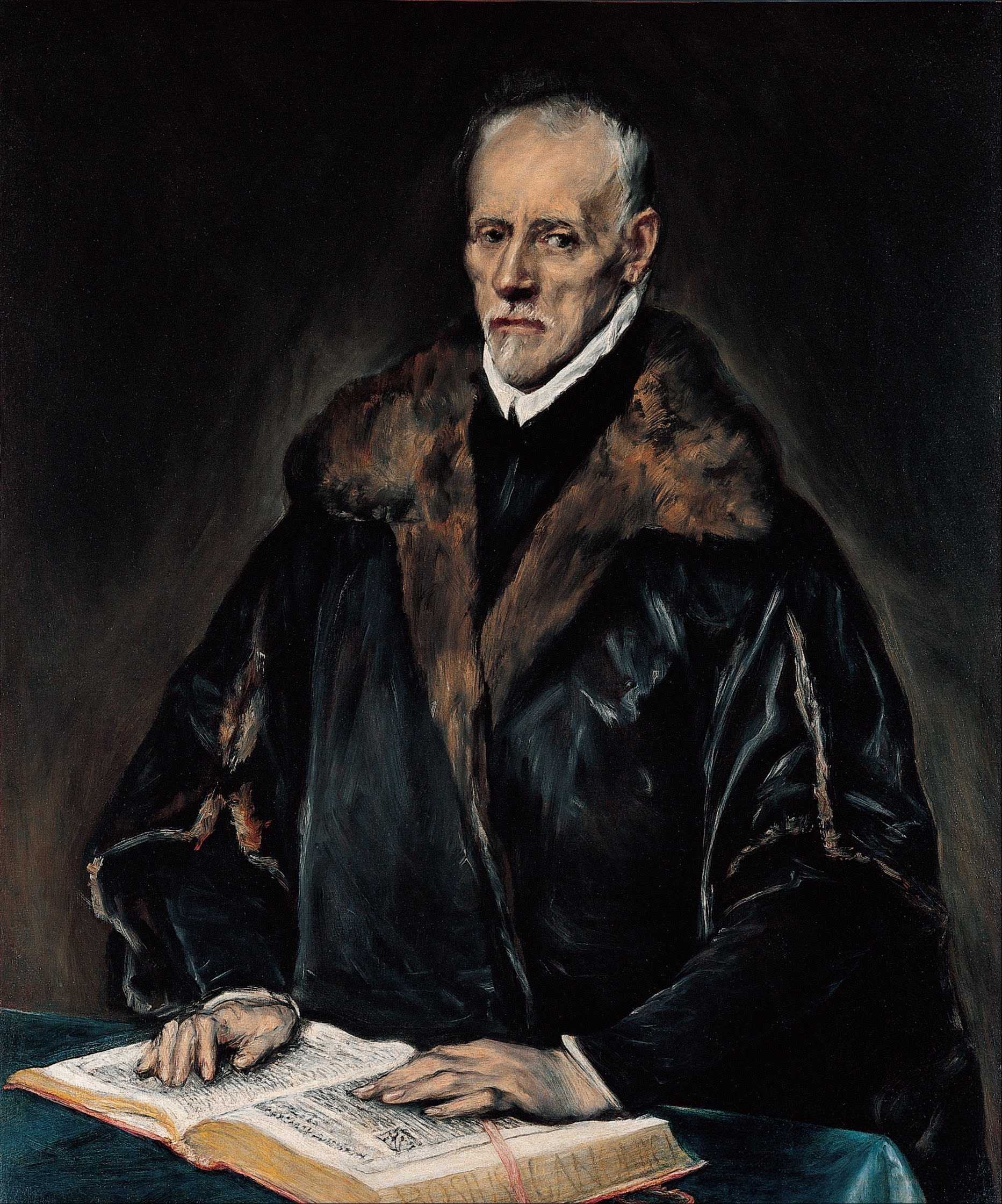
- Artist: El Greco
- Year: 1610-1614
- Medium: oil on canvas
- Dimensions: 107 cm × 90 cm (42 in × 35 in)
- Location: Kimbell Art Museum, Fort Worth

Portrait of Francisco de Pisa is a 1614 painting by El Greco, now in the Kimbell Art Museum in Fort Worth, Texas. Most art historians identify it as doctor Francisco de Pisa, a Spanish cleric, though a minority identify it as the Italian historian Giacomo Bosio due to the words shown in the open book. Francisco de Pisa was an enemy of Teresa of Ávila, who he criticised because he felt that her works contained "much that contradicts truth and sound doctrine and all good use of mental prayer". The pose of the subject is similar to that in Portrait of Cardinal Tavera, which is of a similar date.

== See also ==
- List of works by El Greco

== Bibliography ==
- ÁLVAREZ LOPERA, José, El Greco, Madrid, Arlanza, 2005, Biblioteca «Descubrir el Arte», (colección «Grandes maestros»). ISBN 84-95503-44-1.
- SCHOLZ-HÄNSEL, Michael, El Greco, Colonia, Taschen, 2003. ISBN 978-3-8228-3173-1.
