= Francisco de Pisa =

Spanish historian and writer (1534–1616)

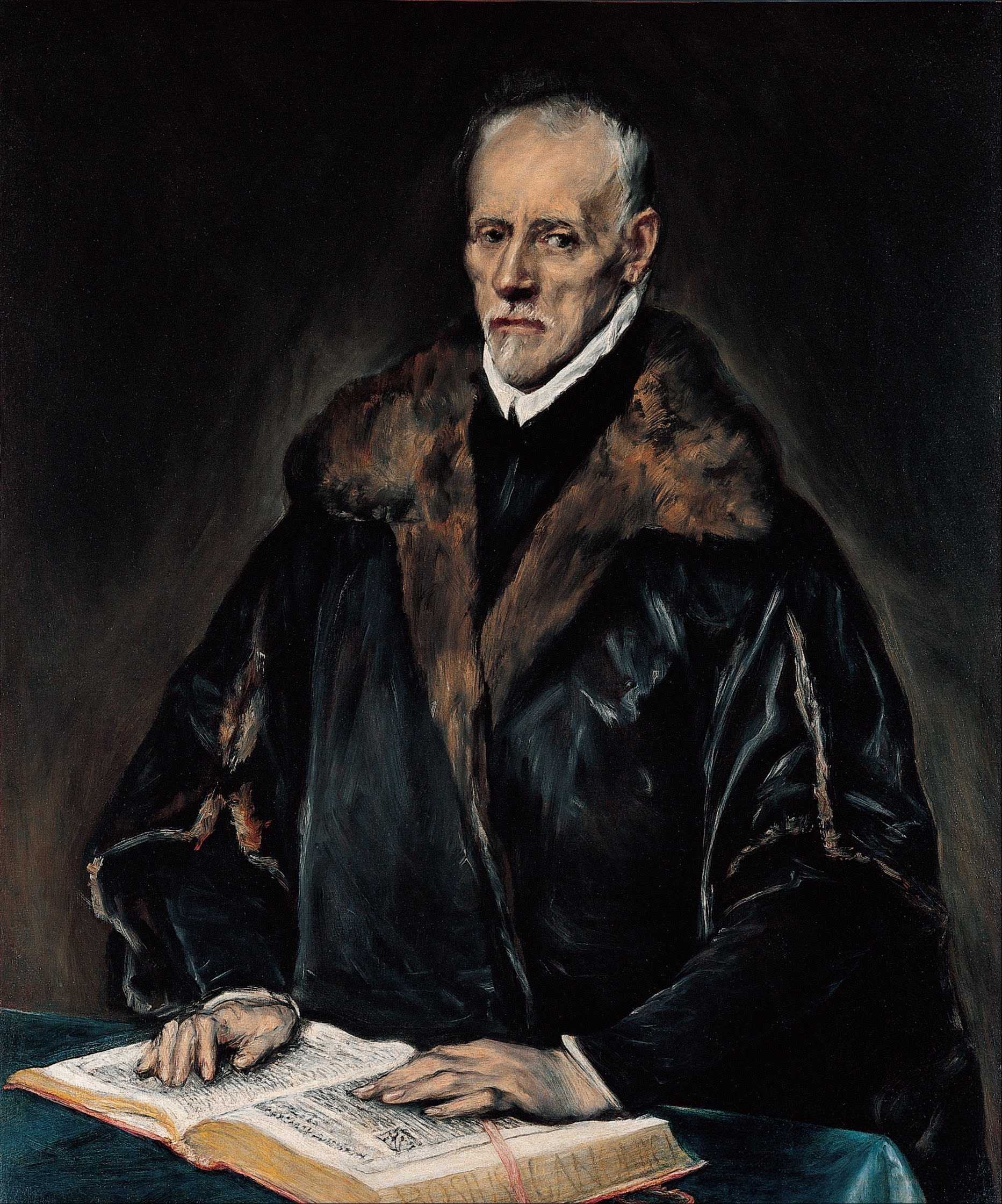
Portrait of Dr. Francisco de Pisa (1610–1614) by El Greco (Kimbell Art Museum, Fort Worth, Texas)

Francisco de Pisa (1534–1616) was a Spanish historian and writer.

== Works ==
- Description of the Imperial City of Toledo, i History of its antiquities, i grandeur, i memorabilia, the Reies that an señoreado, or governed, Arçobispos i his most celebrated. Part divided into five books. With the history of Sancta Leocadia. Toledo: Pedro Rodriguez, 1605; 2. ª ed. Toledo: Diego Rodriguez, 1617.
