= List of marquesses in Italy =

Italy, as a single nation state, began only in 1861, after the Piedmont-based Kingdom of Sardinia conquered most of present-day Italy. At that point, titles were recognized to all who held them according to the law of so-called pre-unitarian States. Consequently, the Kingdom of Italy had several different nobility traditions, one for each pre-unitarian State and one for the unified state (that was actually the Piedmontese-Savoyard one). That is why the Italian College of Arms, called Consulta araldica (heraldic council), was organized in 14 "regional" commissions. Common rules concerning all titles were established only in 1926. (Note: Through the Royal Decree N. 1489 dated 16 August 1926 which contains the statute of the successions to nobility titles (published in the Official Journal on 7 September 1926, N. 208).) That is why a list of Italian marquisates has to be divided into different pre-unitarian lists, plus a unified list for titles granted after 1861. (Note: Titles granted by the King of Italy are actually included in the lists of each Nobility region hereafter, with the exception of Sardinia (for the latter, however, no news about titles of Marquis granted after 1861 is known).) The latter should be completed with titles granted by the last King of Italy, Humbert II, during his exile and after the proclamation of the republic (1946), until his death in 1983: these concessions base upon the fact that he was not defeated in war and thus remained a king, that is a fons honorum, but this issue is controversial, titles granted by a non-reigning king not being recognized by most noble and royal families in Europe. Only the Sovereign Military Order of Malta and the Corpo della Nobiltà Italiana recognize these titles, while the CILANE treats them as mere titles of courtesy. Since 1948, the republican constitution states that nobility titles are not recognized. It means that public bodies have not the power to use them towards nobility and tribunals have no power to state about their existence or non-existence, even as an interlocutory matter. The main association that privately protects titles and nobility is the Corpo della Nobiltà Italiana (body of the Italian nobility, also known as CNI).

== List of marquesses in the Papal States ==
In Rome, several families hold a title of Marquis (marchese). A couple of them (traditionally four) are called "Marquesses of canopy" (in Italian: marchesi di "baldacchino"), since they hold the privilege of being among those that the Pope could visit and kept in their residence a special throne under a canopy for this aim. (Note: The throne is kept with its front towards the wall and its back onwards, meaning that nobody can sit in it but the Pope.) It is a historical privilege (the Pope does not visit privates nowadays) that permits these families to rank among Roman Princes (Note: In Rome, Prince is the upper grade of nobility titles, since there are not Princes of blood royal.) and Dukes and let their members – as it happens for all families of Princes and Dukes in Italy – to be styled as Don or Donna before their first name. Since it is a customary privilege, some of them are disputed, especially in cases when a family became extinct and it is not clear whether another family has inherited the dignity.

=== Canopy marquesses ===
(Note: The canopy privilege pertains also to the house of Counts Soderini.)

- House of Patrizi (Patrizi Naro Montoro), beforehand Naro: the Marquess of Mompeo;
- House of Theodoli, beforehand Astalli: the Marquess of Saint Vitus and Pisoniano;
- House of Costaguti: the Marquess of Sipicciano; this house became extinct in 1921 with the marriage of the last Marquess Costaguti's only child, a daughter, with Marquess Afan de Rivera, whose descent have added the surname Costaguti: it is disputed weather Marquess Afan de Rivera Costaguti is actually a Canopy Marquess;
- House of Cavalieri: the Marquess of Penna; this house became extinct in 1814: it is disputed if the house Capranica had succeeded to the Cavalieri as Canopy Marquesses;
- Count Gerolamo Riccini: the Marquess of Vallepietra, title granted in 1842 explicitly together with honours of canopy but rapidly extinct;
- House of Serlupi (Serlupi Crescenzi), beforehand Crescenzi: Marquess;
- House of Sacchetti: Marquess of Castelromano (Letters patent 1933)

=== Other marquesses in Rome ===
Other marquesses include some distinguished families and also many of the Roman princes, who have among their many titles some of Marquess. The latter are non-included in the list hereafter; on the other hand, the list is incomplete also as concerns houses whose main title is that of Marquess.

- Altoviti-Avila Niccolai Lazzerini: Marquess;
- Cappelletti di Santa Maria del Ponte: Marquess;
- Cavalletti De Rossi, Patricians of Rome: the Marquess of Oliveto Sabino;
- Lepri: Marquess, the Marquess of Rota;
- Mazzetti: the Marquess of Pietralata, Patricians of Rome;
- Pellegrini Quarantotti: the Marquess of Casciolino.

=== List of marquesses in the rest of Latium, in Umbria and in the Marches ===
The list is incomplete.

- House del Gallo, Noble of Rieti: the Marquess of Roccagiovine.

Marchesi Del Monte

=== List of marquesses in the papal "Romagne" ===
The list is incomplete.

- Hercolani (Princes of the Holy Roman Empire, Patrician of Bologna): the Marquess of Blumberg;
- Malvezzi, Patrician of Bologna (1st line, Malvezzi Campeggi): the Marquess of Dozza
- Malvezzi, Patrician of Bologna (2nd line, Malvezzi de' Medici): the Marquess of Castelguelfo;

== List of marquesses in Piedmont ==
Present Piedmont was called the principality of Piedmont and in its territory lie the former sovereign Marquisates of Montferrat (later Dukedom) and Saluzzo. Since it has been ruled by the Duke of Savoy whose sovereign title was that of Duke, the title of Marquis is quite rare and reveals a relevant rank. Hereafter some of the houses holding a title of marquis are listed, in alphabetical order, and the relevant title is indicated with the form of succession. The list is incomplete.

- Asinari: the Marquess of San Marzano (the eldest male);
- Birago de Candia e Borgaro: since 1680, Marquess of Candia (all males).
- del Carretto (Lords of Ponti and Sessame): Marquess (all males);
- Cordero (known as Montezemolo): the Marquess of Montezemolo (the eldest male);
- Guasco (Princes): Marquess of Bisio and Francavilla (all males);
- Manfredi (known as d'Androgna): the Marquess of Angrogna (all males);
- Incisa (both lines d'Incisa di Camerana and d'Incisa della Rocchetta): Marquess (all males);
- Medici del Vascello: Marquess (the eldest male);
- Mori Ubaldini degli Alberti: (Note: House Mori Ubaldini are from Tuscany, Patricians both of Florence and of Siena; this line inherited the title of Marquess of Marmora from the Piedmontese house Ferrero and lives in Piedmont.) the Marquess of Marmora (the eldest male);
- Ripa: the Marquess of Giaglione (the eldest male), Marquess of Meana (all males);
- Taparelli (known as d'Azeglio): the Marquess of Azeglio (the eldest male);
- Thaon (Counts of Revel; known as Thaon di Revel): Marquess (the eldest male);

== List of marquesses in Sardinia ==
The following section contains the list of all Marquessates that have been existing or have existed in the Kingdom of Sardinia. Titles were created through letters patent by the King of Sardinia, who was also King of Aragon since 1326 (actual creation of the Kingdom of Sardinia) to 1500, King of Spain and of Aragon since 1500 to 1713, Emperor of the Holy Roman Empire since 1519 to 1556 and since 1713 to 1720 and Duke of Savoy since 1720 to 1847. The autonomous Kingdom of Sardinia ceased in 1847, when its Parliament asked the King – and obtained – for the unification (Italian: perfetta fusione) with the other States belonging to him, namely the Dukedom of Savoy, the Principality of Piedmont, the County of Nice and the Dukedom of Genoa. Titles granted after 1847 by the kings of Sardinia, who became also Kings of Italy since 1861, are not listed here. Feudalism ceased in the years 1838–1840, when fiefs were redeemed by the Crown, i.e. bought. Afterwards, titles continued to be recognized as honours, and nothing changed to this regard after the unification of Italy. Since the establishment of the Italian Republic in 1946, titles are not officially recognized anymore and they exist as traditional and historical remains. The main associations that privately protect titles and nobility are the Corpo della Nobiltà Italiana (body of the Italian nobility, also known as CNI) and the Corpo della Nobiltà Sarda (body of the Sardinian nobility).

In 14th and 15th centuries, no titles were granted, but only fief possession. Lords of fiefs were called (in Catalan) Barons or Señors, i.e. lords (normally – but not always – the distinction depended on the extent of the power granted with the fief: Barons had the merum and mixtum imperium, meaning civil and criminal jurisdiction, while Lords only the mixtum imperium, civil jurisdiction) without these terms referring to specific titles but indicating just their quality of fief owners. Progressively, as a mark of distinction, a couple of titles of Viscount were granted: the Kings of Aragon were primarily Counts of Barcelona, so the usual title they had granted in Catalonia had been the one below their own rank. Chiefly in the 16th century, most important feudal lords began to receive titles of Counts, in order to emphasize their role. Only since the end of the century titles of Marquess (Marquis) were granted, as a result of an inflation of titles. Titles of Dukes were as rare as only one was granted before the Savoy rule. A few exception to this trend have to be regarded as recognition of quasi-sovereign status: the rulers of Arborea had in different times the titles of Judex Arboreae, (Note: Hugo II of Bas in 1322.) Count of Goceano, (Note: Marian IV of Bas in 1339.) Count of Monteleone (Note: Brancaleone Doria in 1383.) and Marquis of Oristano, while the foremost house of Carroz, admirals and viceroys, had the title of Count of Quirra. (Note: Berenguer Carroz in 1363: see below for the upgrading of this fief in Marquessate.)

Since the rank of marquis was theoretically the highest one, marquesses were addressed as "illustrious" by anyone and as "cousin" by the monarch, a concept similar to peerage. (Note: When since 1793 the stamento militare (a kind of house of lords of the Sardinian parliament) met to face the revolutionary Frenchmen (and they were actually successful: Sardinia remained the only European land not invaded by Napoleon, together with Great Britain, Ireland, Sicily and Russia) and had a correspondence with the crown, they got quite upset with a king's reply not respecting that tradition in addressing the marquis of Laconi, then the chairman of the house, until the secretary (i.e. the minister for interiors) explained that the marquis had not been addressed by his majesty as "illustrious cousin" due to a mere copyist's mistake. The letters are now published together with the parliamentary minutes in Carta, Luciano, ed. (2000) [1793]. Acta Curiarum Regni Sardiniae – L'attività degli stamenti nella "Sarda rivoluzione" [The Sardinia parliament acts – The activity of the houses in the "Sardinian revolution"] (in Italian). Vol. 24-I. Cagliari: Consiglio regionale della Sardegna (Sardinia Regional Council. pp. 340, 380, 416 and 649.)

Titles were granted either according to the Italian or the Catalan tradition (Latin respectively iuxta morem Italiae and iuxta morem Cathaluniae), meaning that the succession was only by male primogeniture or also by females if the holder of the title had no sons. Succession by females was abolished in 1926, meaning that if the holder has no sons, the title passes to his younger brother, if any (as the normal succession for British titles today).

Number	Title	Year of creation	Grantee	Holder at the redemption of fiefs	Present holder	Comments
1	Marquis of Oristano	1410	Leonardo Cubello	the King (Note: Who was actually Charles Albert at the time.)	the heir to the Sardinian crown, Emanuele Filiberto of Savoy	created as continuation of once-autonomous "judgedom" (kingdom) of Arborea, after the defeat of the rebellious Marquis in 1478 the Crown added that title to its own titles; the city of Oristano, once Arborea capital city, became a royal city
2	Marquis of Mandas	16th century	Pedro Maza de Lizana	transformed in dukedom	see Duke of Mandas	
3	Marquis of Terranova	1579	Pedro Maza	Pedro Tellez y Giron	The Duke of Osuna	
4	Marquis of Villasor	1594	Jaime Alagon	Francisco De Silva	The Marquess of Villasor, Álvaro Fernández-Villaverde y Silva	upgrading of the ancient county of Villasor
5	Marquis of Quirra	1603	Cristobal Centelles	Felipe Osorio	the Duke of Albuquerque?	upgrading of the ancient county of Quirra
6	Marquis of Laconi	1603	Jaime Castelvi	Ignazio Aymerich	The Marquis of Laconi	upgrading of the ancient county of Laconi
7	Marquis of Mores (Note: The title takes name from the village of Mores in Northern Sardinia and is spellt Mores in Catalan, Spanish, Sardinian, Italian and Latin; when the main branch of the family moved to France, the title started to be spellt Morès to roughly indicate the right pronunciation to French-speakers and was widely widespread by the famous Antoine Manca de Vallombrosa)	1614	Caterina Manca	Vincenzo Manca	disputed	upgrading of the ancient county of Mores. After in 1775 the Dukedom of Asinara was created and granted to the Marquis of Mores, the latter title could be borne by the Duke's first son and heir apparent; since the dukedom has peculiar succession rules, who actually holds the title is an unsolved question
8	Marquis of Orani	1617	Caterina De Silva	Rafael Rodriguez Fernandez	The Duke of Alba	
9	Marquis of Palmas	1627	Luis Gualbes	Joaquin Bou Crespi de Valldaura	The Count of Orgaz	upgrading of the 17th-century county of Palmas
10	Marquis of Villacidro	1629	Antonio Brondo	Joaquin Bou Crespi de Valldaura	The Count of Orgaz	
11	Marquis of Torralba	1631	Miguel Comprat	Juan Bautista de Queralt	Enrique de Queralt	
12	Marquis of Siete Fuentes	1635	Juan Bautista Zatrillas	Pietro Vivaldi Pasqua	The Duke of Saint John	
13	Marquis of Albis	1645 (Note: The diploma has been issued in 1651 but the ancientcy of the title is 1645, since the decision was in that year but the diploma could be issued only in 1651 due to a pending cause. This fact is referred to by Origen, D. Scano say 1649 and F. Floris 1643. The original diploma, kept in the archive Amat di San Filippo in Cagliari with accession code TPP/30, fully confirms Origen.)	Antonio Manca-Guiso	The king and Vincenzo Amat (Note: Due to a transaction between the crown and the marchioness of Albis in her own right, in 1808 the fief was abolished and incorporated to the crown possessions, while the marchioness and her descendants kept the title and the connected rank, together with other fiefs. See F. Floris, page 532.)	The Marquess of San Felipe	upgrading of the ancient barony of Galtelli and Orosei
14	Marquis of Villarios	1646	Juan Bautista Amat (Note: Origen, Elenco and F. Floris. D. Scano says Francisco, who however was Juan Bautista's father who had previously obtained the title of count of Villanova del Rio.)	Vittorio Amat	disputed	upgrading of the county of Villanova del Rio (Note: In the territory of Alghero.)
15	Marquis of Cea	1646	Pablo Castelvì	extinct	extinct	the last Marquis of Cea being Don Jayme Artal Castelvi, who lost the fief in 1669 due to the Camarassa affair. The fief consisted in the two villages of Banari and Siligo, that became afterwards the county of Montacuto (in 1699, to Fortesa family) and, after the extinction of that title, the county of Villanova Montesanto (1741 to Musso family).
16	Marquis of Soleminis	1651	Francisco Vico (alias Francisco Vico Zonza)	Vincenzo Amat	The Marquess of San Felipe	
17	Marquis of Montemaggiore (Monte Mayor)	1652	Pedro Ravaneda	Vincenzo Manca	disputed (Note: See Marquis of Morès.)	upgrading of the ancient lordship of Thiesi
18	Marquis of the Guard (de la Guardia)	1699	Antonio Francisco Genoves	extinct (Note: The fief consisted in the castle of the Guard and the unpopulated surrounding territories in Sulcis. The Marquis never succeeded in populating them, but the fief is important because it is the first one granted to this merchant family rapidly growing in importance, until they obtained the title of Duke of San Pietro in 1737. In 1812 they got extinguished and the fiefs were incorporated to the crown possession.)	extinct	
19	Marquis of Villaclara	1700	Joseph Zatrillas	Pietro Vivaldi Pasqua	The Duke of Saint John	The fief was named after a village by Ballao, later abandoned.
20	Marquis of Conquistas	1708	Miguel Cervellon	Vincenzo Amat	The Marquess of San Felipe	originally constituted by different kind of possessions (territories of Platamona and La Crucca in north Sardinia, the rights of the registrar of the cities of Sassari and Bosa, the little island of San Simone called Sa Illetta in the pond of Cagliari, called Santa Gilla and two fisheries nearby called Is Ois and Sa Coa), it was inherited by Don Francisco Vico; after his death, the fief was renewed to Vincenzo Amat in 1826 but only consisting of Sa Illetta and the fisheries.
21	Marquis of San Felipe	1709	Vicente Bacallar	Vincenzo Amat	The Marquess of San Felipe	not a feudal title
22	Marquis of Isola Rossa	1710	Joseph Masones	house Del Alcazar (Madrid) (Note: Although the Isola Rossa ("the Red Island") itself had been acquired by the crown: see Vacca Odone)	dormant (Note: The eldest of Del Alcazar house does not use that title.)	
23	Marquis of Villamarina	1711	Francisco Pes	Francesco Pes	extinct	
24	Marquis of Saint Ursula	1716	Juan Bautista Cugia	Gavino Cugia (died 1839) and his son Giovanni Battista	The Marquis of Saint Ursula	not a feudal title
25	Marquis of Putifigari	1717 (Note: The first grant has been by King Charles VI to Francisco Pilo-Boyl in 1717 (1714 according to F. Floris), during the War of the Spanish Succession; after the loss of the throne by the Habsburgs, the fief was contested and a trial began, ended by a confirmation of the title by King Charles Emanuel III (of the new ruler dynasty, the House of Savoy) to Pedro Pilo Boyl in 1757.)	Francisco Pilo-Boyl	Francesco Maria Pilo Boyl	The Marquis of Putifigari	upgrading of the ancient barony of Putifigari
26	Marquis of Valverde	1735	Joseph Carrion	Giovanna Carrion	disputed	renewed from the previous title granted to Ferrets on the unpopulated village of Vesos near Alghero in 1660, according to F. Floris
27	Marquis of Saint Mary	1735	Luis De Roma	extinct	extinct	not a feudal title
28	Marquis of Samassi	1736	Antonio Simon Squinto	Lorenzo Ricca di Castelvecchio	unknown	
29	Marquis of Sedilo and Canales	1737	Juan Maria Solinas (Note: According to F. Floris (p. 501), Francisco Solinas bought the fief for his nephew or grandson Juan Maria, who obtained the title of marquis.)	Salvatore Delitala	extinct	
30	Marquis of Isola Maggiore	1745	Bernardino Antonio Genoves	it has been included in the next title	disputed (or extinct)	The Marquis of Villahermosa e Santa Croce included in his title
31	Marquis of Villahermosa and Saint Cross	1745	Bernardino Antonio Genoves	Carlo Manca	The Marquis of Villahermosa e Santa Croce	unpopulated fief, consisting in the mountains (saltos) of Pompongia, Curcuris, Fenugheda, Isola Maggiore e Fossadus by Oristano
32	Marquis of Saint Thomas	1747	Juana Maria Cervellon	Tomaso Nin (Note: Or Tommaso (F. Floris).)	extinct (Note: It had been inherited by Giuseppe Gnecco, but got extinct with his son Luigi, who had no sons at a time when female succession was not allowed anymore.)	consists of two villages, Gesico and Goni
33	Marquis of San Sperate	1749	Joseph Cadello	Efisio Cadello	The Marquis of Neoneli	
34	Marquis of Saint Xavier	1749	Francisca Brunengo	Giovanna Carcassona (Note: E. Vacca Odone calls her by mistakes Giovanni, as if she were a male.)	extinct (Note: It had been inherited by Giuseppe Gnecco, but got extinct with his son Luigi, who had no sons at a time when female succession was not allowed anymore.)	consisting in two villages, Donori and Serdiana
35	Marquis of Valdecalzana	1750	some Martinez	Juan Bautista de Queralt	Enrique de Queralt	possibly not a Sardinian title, but a Spanish one
36	Marquis of Saint Charles	1754	Jayme Borro	Giovanni Antonio Paliacio	unknown	consisting in the territory of Marrubiu, it was inherited by a line of Cugias (see after) now extinct; it is unsure whether the present line retains the right to it
37	Marquis of Planargia	1756	Ignacio Paliacio	Giovanni Antonio Paliaccio (Note: Also called Palici (that is the present form of the family's surname, although they are usually called "di Suni" (see N. 47).)	The Marquis of Planargia	
38	Marquis of Montemuros	1762	Pedro Martinez	Pietro Martinez (Note: A grandson of the latter.)	extinct	
39	Marquis of Saint Christopher	1763	Antonio Todde	the title got extinct and the territory was granted to the royal city of Bosa	extinct	consisting in the village of Montresta and its unpopulated surroundings
40	Marquis of Marghine	1767	Maria Pimentel	Pedro Tellez y Giron	The Duke of Osuna	Due to a trial about the ancient county of Oliva that the Crown considered extinct, doña Maria Pimentel obtained the title after being recognized partial heir (Note: Together with the titles of Princess of Anglona, Duchess of Montacuto and Countess of Osilo, the title of princess of Anglona being the only princely title ever attributed in the kingdom of Sardinia.)
41	Marquis of Arcais	1767	Damiano Nurra	Francesco Flores	The Marquis of Arcais	The fief included only the incomes of the three Campidanos plains of Oristano (Greater Campidano, Campidano of Milis and Campidano of Zerfaliu, excluding the Royal City of Oristano), with no judiciary or administrative power whatsoever
42	Marquis of Saint Victor	1773	Antonio Todde	Giuseppe Pes	Disputed	Consisting of three villages: Sorradile, Bidonì and Nughedu.
43	Marquis of Neoneli	1774	Pedro Ripoll	Mariangela Ripoll, Baron Sanjust's consort	The Marquis of Neoneli	Consisting also of the village of Ardauli and of the large surrounding hills, but with limited jurisdiction out of the villages.
44	Marquis of Manca	1777	Emanuel Delitala (aka De Litala)	Fernando or Emanuel Delitala	Extinct (Note: Having the last Marquis of Manca, another Emanuele Delitala, died 8 March 2011. See the genealogical tree. The news of the last Marquess's death is in the Sardinian Nobility Association website, by entering and clicking on "L'associazione araldica" on the left: in the last-but-one section, "Aggiornamenti agli alberi genealogici delle famiglie nobili sarde" (updates to Sardinian noble families genealogical trees), in order by date.)	Not a feudal title
45	Marquis of Musei	1785	Joaquin Bou Crespi de Valldaura	Joaquin Bou Crespi de Valldaura (Note: The latter's son.)	The Count of Orgaz	
46	Marquis of Busachi	1790	Teresa Deliperi	Stefanina Ledà (Note: Also called Stefania. D. Scano calls her Stefanino, as if it were a male.)	extinct	
47	Marquis of Gallura	18th century	Federigo Portugal	Rafael Fadriguez Fernandez	The Marquis of Gallura should be the incumbent Duke of Alba, but they do not use this title.	
48	Marquis of Saint Saturninus	1806	Raimondo Quesada	Raimondo Quesada	extinct	not a feudal title
49	Marquis of Saint Maurice	1815	Giovanni Amat	Giovanni Amat	extinct	not a feudal title
50	Marquis of Saint Sebastian	1816	Carlo Quesada	Carlo Quesada	The Marquis of Saint Sebastian	not a feudal title
51	Marquis of Nissa	1836	Giovanni Manca	Carlo Manca	The Marquis of Villahermosa e Santa Croce	not a feudal title
52	Marquis of Cervellon	1838	Damiano Flores	Damiano Flores	Disputed	Not a feudal title. The possession of the title of Baron of Samatzai was contested to Damiano Flores's mother, Maria Rita Cervellon, by the Crown; since the trial was still on-going when fiefs were redeemed, he had as a renewal of the old title the mere dignity of Marquis of Cervellon.
53	Marquis of Saint Fidelius	1840	Gaetano Mearza (Note: D. Scano calls him Gaetano Marazza Guirisi (the double surname, the father's and the mother's ones, being a common usage in Sardinia until the 20th century such as it is still now in Spain), but the form of the first surname is probably due to a typographic mistake.)	Gaetano Mearza (supposed)	extinct	not a feudal title

Note on language. The ordinary use in Sardinia is that proper names be translated according to the language of the document: that is why name of titles has been translated to English if the case be. (Note: In general terms, the names have been translated if referring to persons or churches or concepts (especially for saints), e.g. San Felipe, and left in the original or present most used form if they are names of villages (except when there is an English form for the name of the village: but this does not actually happen), e.g. San Sperate in Italian or Siete Fuentes in Spanish.) For name of people, we adopted the actual most used language at the time: Catalan until the 16th century included, Spanish for the 17th and 18th centuries and later for Spanish subjects, and Italian for the 19th century for Sardinian subjects.

== List of marquesses in Lombardy ==
Lombardy has probably been Italian land with most encountering of Nobility traditions. Consequently, Lombard Nobility has all Italian ranks, including Patricians of the most important cities. Just a few main existing houses being styled as Marquesses are listed hereafter in alphabetical order, indicating the house main title if other and – the case be – the city that houses are Patricians of. The list is most incomplete.

- Borromeo (Borromeo Arese, 1st line, Princes of Angera): Marquess of Angera, Patrician of Milan;
- Borromeo (Borromeo d'Adda, 2nd line): Marquess of Pandino, Patrician of Milan;
- Brivio (Brivio Sforza): Marquess of Santa Maria in Prato, Marquess, Patrician of Milan;
- Casati (Casati Stampa): Marquess of Casatenovo, Patrician of Milan;
- Gallarati Scotti (Princes of Molfetta): Marquess of Cerano, Patrician of Milan;
- Stampa: Marquess of Soncino, Count of the Holy Roman Empire, Patrician of Milan;
- Terzi (Lords of Sant'Agata): Marquess, Noble of Bergamo;
- Visconti di Modrone (Dukes): Marquess of Vimodrone, Patrician of Milan.

== List of marquesses in Liguria ==
Genoa was ruled as an aristocrat republic until the Napoleonic age, extending its dominion to the whole Liguria and some areas of present Piedmont; after the restoration it became part of the Piedmont-led Kingdom of Sardinia. As all Nobles could be elected to a government office, all were in principle equal; they had the title of Patrician of Genoa, indicated by p.g. after the name and surname, while members of noble families outside the capital had the title of Nobleman or Noblewoman. No other title was specific of the Republic, but several families got titles from other rulers. After the fall of the republic, a consideration arouse: since the head of the State was the Doge, i.e. a Duke, Patrician of Genoa had to be considered as just below, i.e. Marquesses: consequently several head of families pledged for such an acknowledgment by the Consulta araldica and the Corpo della Nobiltà Italiana and are styled as Marquesses today; this automatic acknowledgment has been questioned at the end of 20th century and is no more realized by the C.N.I., those acknowledgments already done remaining valid.

Houses whose eldest male bear the title of Marquess before his name (incomplete list):

- Balbi;
- Cambiaso;
- Cattaneo Adorno;
- Chiavari;
- Curlo;
- De Ferrari (second and third line);
- Doria (various lines);
- Durazzo;
- Giustiniani;
- Gropallo;
- Imperiale and Imperiali;
- Invrea;
- Lomellini (Lomellini Tabarca);
- Negrotto Cambiaso;
- Pallavicini and Pallavicino;
- Pinelli (Pinelli Gentile).

Other titles:

- Marquess of Pontinvrea: house of Durazzo;
- Marquess of Sforzesca: house of Gropallo.

== List of marquesses in the so-called "Venices" ==
Venice has been an independent aristocratic republic since the 8th century until 1797. Since the power was shared among noble houses and every nobleman could be elected (by vote or by ballot) to the most important offices, all noble houses were in principle equal: every member of the aristocracy had the only title of nobiluomo (nobleman) or nobildonna (noblewoman), although some of the Venetian houses are actually the oldest aristocracy in the world, since they can track their ancestors back to the beginning of the Republic. Venice (usually called the Serenissima Republica) was a naval power and thus the wealth of Venetians did not depend on the land but on trades. Also other cities and towns in Venice inland, although subject to Venice, were ruled by noble councils, whose members were nobles by the right to participate to council: the Venetian region is the land of civic nobility. For these reasons, nobility titles other than Nobil Homo/Nobil Donna (usually indicated as N.H. and N.D.), Patrician of Venice (or Venetian Patrician) and Nobleman/Noblewoman of a certain city or town are the only real Venetian titles. After the fall of the republic, under Habsburgs rule, and since 1866 under Italian rule, many Venetian houses got traditional titles, most of them count, that is usually for all family members or at least for all males and usually with no territorial indication. The following list of titles of Marquesses is just the list of families living in the Venetian territories who presently bear such a title, without these title being "Venetian" titles. It is an extract of titles recorded by the three Nobility associations whose competence is the former Venetian territory and that are inspired by the regional commissions of the Consulta araldica: the Venetian one for present Italian region Veneto and provinces of Udine and Pordenone of present-day Italian region Friuli-Venezia Giulia (that is proper Friuli), the Trento one for present Italian region Trentino-Alto Adige/Südtirol (although its competence for noble houses from Alto Adige or South Tyrol, that is the German-speaking province of Bolzano, remains doubtful: are they Italian or Austrian nobles?), and the one for Venezia Giulia, Istria e Dalmazia for present provinces of Trieste and Gorizia (Venezia Giulia or Julian March, part of present administrative region of Friuli-Venezia Giulia) and families coming from present Slovenian and Croatian territories of Istria and Dalmatia. Only flourishing families are recorded and they appear in alphabetical order, the particle "de" not being considered to this aim unless it is written with a capital letter. (Note: Because in that case it is not a particle but part of the name.)

Number	Family name	Title	Arms	Holder(s)	Family origin	Comments
1	de Bassecourt	Marquis		the eldest male	Spain	Probably extinct
2	di Brazzà e Cergneu Savorgnan	Marquis of Gavignano		the eldest male	Friuli	
3	Buzzaccarini de Vetulis	Marquis of Saint-Raphael, Marquis		the eldest male, all males	Padua	
4	di Canossa	Marquis		all males	Canossa	
5	Carlotti	Marquis, Marquis of Riparbella		all males, all males in two lines	Verona	
6	Colloredo Mels	Marquis of Saint Sophia		the eldest male	Friuli	the title belong to only one of the two Colloredo Mels existing houses
7	de Concina	Marquis		the eldest male	Clauzetto	Extinct as for males
8	Fabris Isnardis	Marquis		all males	Carnia	Extinct as for males
9	Frangipane	Marquis		the eldest male	Rome and Friuli	the eldest male actually brings the surnames Frangipane di Strassoldo Soffunbergo
10	Gajoni Berti	Marquis		all males	Verona	
11	Gonzaga	Marquis of the Vodice, Marquis		the eldest male, all males	Mantua	the last surviving branch of the lords, marquesses and dukes of Mantua, they are registered in the Venetian lists due to the title of Venetian Patrician, that they bring among others (first and foremost, prince of the Holy Roman Empire and Highness)
12	Lechi	Marquis of Castellarano and San Cassiano		the eldest male	Brescia	
13	da Lisca	Marquis		all members	Verona	
14	Malaspina	Marquis		all males	Verona	
15	Manfredini	Marquis		all males	Rovigo	
16	Mangilli	Marquis of San Gallo in Moggio		all males	Bergamo	
17	Manzoni	Marquis		all members	Padua	
18	Meli Lupi di Soragna Tarasconi	Marquis		all members	Parma	
19	Polesini	Maquis		all males	Istria	
20	Revedin	Marquis of Saint Martin		the eldest male	Ferrara	
21	Roi	Marquis		the eldest male	Vicenza	
22	Saibante	Marquis		all members	Egna	
23	Selvatico Estense	Marquis of Querzola		the eldest male	Padua	
24	Stornaiuolo (also spelled 'Stornaiolo')	Marquis of Pressana, Marquis		the eldest male, all males	Naples	Title dormant since 1797
25	Strozzi	Marquis		all males	Florence	This line of the flourishing family is extinct as for males
26	Voelkl	Marquis		the eldest male	Trieste	probably extinct
27	Zamboni	Marquis of Salerano		the eldest male	Verona	

Besides of the family titles, two members of the clergy bear, among others, the title of Marquis:

- the bishop of Treviso;
- the bishop of Vicenza.

The use of the Roman Catholic Church is that bishop not use nobility tiles nowadays.

== List of marquesses in Parma and Piacenza ==
List of all noble houses bearing the title of Marquis nowadays or that are recently extinct, recognized by the Corpo della Nobiltà Italiana. The list is ordered by ancientness of the title.

Number	Family Name	Title	Arms	Date of Creation	Holder(s)	Origin	Comments
1	Pallavicino	Marquis		Ab immemorabili	all members	Parma	
2	Meli Lupi di Soragna	Marquis		1477	all members	Parma	including the second line, bearing the surname Meli Lupi di Soragna Tarasconi
3	Anguissola di Vigolzone	Marquis of Grazzano with Maiano e Verano		1599	all males	Piacenza	
4	Landi	Marquis of Chiavenna		1648	all males	Piacenza	
5	Casali	Marquis of Monticelli d'Ongina		1650	all males	Piacenza	
6	Cusani	Marquis of Vicomero		1651	all males	Parma	
7	Casati Rollieri	Marquis		1660 and 1676	the eldest male	Piacenza	
8	Lalatta	Marquis		1695	all males	Parma	
9	Lalatta Costerbosa	Marquis		1695	all males	Parma	a line of the above
10	Tirelli	Marquis		1696	all members	Parma	
11	Volpe Landi	Marquis of Ivaccari		1697	all males	Piacenza	
12	Tedaldi	Marquis of Tavasca and Valle Lunga		1705	all males	Piacenza	
13	Mischi	Marquis of Costamezzana		1706	all males	Piacenza	
14	Manara	Marquis of Ozzano with Triano and Sivizzano		1709	all males	Parma	extinct
15	Paveri Fontana	Marquis of Fontana Pradosa		1716	all males	Piacenza	
16	Dosi	Marquis		1733	all males	Pontremoli	
17	Dosi Delfini	Marquis		1733	all males	Pontremoli	a line of the above
18	Sanvitale	Marquis of Medesano		1733	all males	Parma	
19	Sanvitale Simonetta	Marquis of Medesano		1733	all males	Parma	a line of the above
20	Malaspina	Marquis of Carbonara		1768	the eldest male	Bobbio	
21	dalla Rosa Prati	Marquis of Collecchio with Collecchiello and Madregolo		1777	all males	Parma	
22	Paveri Fontana	Marquis of Piozzano		1779	the eldest male	Piacenza	another title of the Marquesses of Fontana Pradosa – upgrading of the title of Count granted in 1633
23	Pavesi Negri	Marquis of Castelnovo		1794	all males	Parma	
24	Corradi Cervi	Marquis of Piantogna		1795	all males	Parma	
25	Malaspina	Marquis of Volpedo		1889 (recognized)	the eldest male	Bobbio	another title of the Marquis of Carbonara (see above)
26	Malaspina	Marquis of Orezzoli		1911	all males	Bobbio	
27	Nasalli Rocca Taffini	Marquis of Acceglio		renovated in 1912	the eldest male	Piacenza	
28	Malvicini Fontana	Marquis		recognized in 1915	all males	Piacenza	
29	Malaspina	Marquis		?	all males	Bobbio	line of Frassi; title recognized by the CNI in 2000

== List of marquesses in Modena and Reggio ==
The Duchy of Modena and Reggio was an independent State from 1598 (before it depended upon Ferrara, that was the main see of the ruling family) until the unification of Italy in 1859, under the rule of the Este until the Napoleonic era and after the Restoration, since 1814, under the Habsburg-Este who had inherited it. The aristocracy of the Duchy includes many families whose members are Patricians of Modena, Patricians of Reggio, Noble of Mirandola, Noble of Carpi, Noble of Finale or Noble of Correggio; several of them, moreover, have the title of Count or Marquis; some had foreign titles. The list hereunder includes only the titles of flourishing families recognized by the Corpo della Nobiltà Italiana (C.N.I.) (Note: The list of all noble houses of the Duchy has been edited by the local association of the nobility, part of the C.N.I., together with the association of the Duchy of Parma and Piacenza (see sources).) listed in alphabetical order: the particle "de" is not considered to this aim unless it is written with a capital letter.

Number	Family name	Title	Arms	Holder(s)	Other titles	Comments
1	de Buoi	Marquis		all males	Patricians of Modena and others	
2	de Buoi Vizzani	Marquis		all males	Patricians of Modena and others	a line of the preceding family
3	Calori Stremiti	Marquis of Cavriago and of Cadè		the eldest male	Count (other males) and others	
4	Campori	Marquis of Soliera		all males	Patricians of Modena etc.	
5	Carandini	Marquis of Sarzano		the eldest male	Counts (other males) etc.	
6	Coccapani Imperiali	Marquis of Spezzano; Marquis		the eldest male; all other males	Noble of Carpi	also called Coccapani Imperiale
7	Fontanelli	Marquis		the eldest male	Counts (all males and females)	extinct
8	Frosini	Marquis of Albinea, Borzano, Mozzadella, Montericco		the eldest male	Patricians of Modena	
9	Gherardini	Marquis of Scurano, Bazzano and Pianzo; Marquis of San Polo; Marquis		the eldest male; the eldest male; all males	Counts, Patrician of Reggio, etc.	
10	Malaspina Estense	Marquis of Virgoletta, Villa Rocchetta, Beverone, Garbugliaga, Villafranca		the eldest male	none	
11	Malaspina Torello Scotti	Marquis of Ponte Bosio		the eldest male	none	
12	Molza	Marquis		the eldest male	Patrician of Modena	extinct line
13	Montecuccoli Degli Erri	Marquis of Polinago, Vaglio, Susano, Pigneto, Prignano; Marquis		the eldest male; all males	Patricians of Modena	
14	Ollandini	Marquis		all males	none	
15	Paolucci	Marquis of Vigona, Cividale, Roncole; Marquis		the eldest male, all males	Patricians of Modena, etc.	
16	Parisetti Vaini	Marquis of Sigola		the eldest male	Don or Donna	extinct
17	Ponticelli	Marquis of Camposanto; Marquis		the eldest male; all males	Patricians of Modena	extinct
18	Rangoni Machiavelli	Marquis		all males	Patricians of Modena, Patricians of Reggio etc.	
19	Rocca Saporiti	Marquis of the Sforzesca		the eldest male	Counts (all members)	extinct
20	Tacoli	Marquis of San Possidonio; Marquis		the eldest male; all males	Patricians of Modena, Patricians of Reggio	
21	Tassoni Estense	Marquis of Castelvecchio		all males	Patricians of Modena etc.	

== List of marquesses in Tuscany ==
In Tuscany during the middle age and early modern era all towns and cities were autonomous States with the form of Republics, each having its own Nobility. That is why, in the most incomplete list hereafter, for each house not only is indicated the title of Marquess, but also the Patriciate they hold. Houses are listed by order of creation.

Number	Family Name	Title	Arms	Patriciate	Date of Creation	Comments
1	Bentivoglio	Marquis of Magliano			14 Aug 1559	
2	Ramirez di Montalvo	Marquis of Sassetta			19 Oct 1563	
3	Brignole-Sale	Marquis of Groppoli		Genoa	4 Jul 1592	Passes to males and females
4	Ximenes	Marquis of Saturnia		Lisbon	3 Oct 1593	
5	Bourbon del Monte	Marquis of Piancastagnaio		Florence	20 Nov 1601	
6	Colloredo	Marquis of Santa Sofia			23 Sep 1615	
7	Salviati	Marquis of Montieri		Florence, Pistoia	22 Sep 1621	
8	de’ Medici	Marquis of Castellina Marittima			17 Mar 1628	
9	Malaspina	Marquis of Terrarossa			20 Dec 1628	
10	Riccardi	Marquis of Chianni		Florence	16 Apr 1629	
11	Giugni	Marquis of Camporsevoli		Florence	26 Jun 1630	
12	Lotteringhi della Stufa	Marquis of Calcione		Florence	11 Jun 1632	
13	Barbolani di Montauto	Marquis of Montevitozzo		Florence	10 Feb 1635	
14	Niccolini	Marquis of Ponsacco		Florence	23 Oct 1637	
15	degli Albizzi	Marquis of Castelnuovo Val di Cecina		Florence	8 Dec 1639	
16	Corsini	Marquis of Laiatico		Florence	10 Jul 1644	The family were also Princes of Sismano and Marquesses of Orciatico, Tresana, Giovagallo, and Castagnetolo
17	Guadagni	Marquis of San Leolino		Florence	26 Jul 1645	
18	Vitelli	Marquis of Bucine		Rome	9 Jun 1646	
19	Ridolfi	Marquis of Montescudaio		Florence	10 May 1648	
20	Incontri	Marquis of Canneto		Florence	7 Dec 1665	
21	Chigi-Zondadari	Marquis of San Quirico			6 Sep 1677	Cosimo III, Grand Duke of Tuscany granted the marquessate to Cardinal Flavio Chigi and it later passed to his sister's descendants
22	Bartolini Salimbeni	Marquis		Florence	22 Mar 1713	by Emperor Charles VI
23	Tempi	Marquis of Barone			10 Dec 1714	
24	Lorenzi	Marquis of Lorenzana			7 May 1722	
25	Frescobaldi	Marquis of Capraia		Florence	5 Jun 1741	
26	Ginori	Marquis of Urbech		Florence	31 Mar 1756	
27	della Gherardesca	Marquis of Castagneto			17 Apr 1776	

Other families with Tuscan Marquessates include:

- Altoviti de'Medici: Marquess of the Holy Roman Empire, Patrician of Florence;
- Antinori: Marquess, Patrician of Florence;
- Bichi Ruspoli Forteguerri Pannilini: Marquess, Patrician of Siena;
- del Carretto (del Carretto di Ponti e Sessame): Marquess;
- Mazzarosa Devincenzi Prini Aulla: Marquess (all males), Patrician of Lucca;
- Rosselli Del Turco (1st line): Marquess, Patrician of Florence;
- San Martino (1st line, San Martino d'Agliè): Marquess of Fontanetto with San Germano, Marquess of Rivarolo with Bosconero;

There were also a small number of ecclesiastical Marquessates, including:

- Cesa
- Stale
- Turicchi

== List of marquesses in the "Neapolitan provinces" (kingdom of Naples and the continental part of the kingdom of the Two Sicilies) ==
The Kingdom of Naples – united, after the Napoleonic age, to the Kingdom of Sicily thus forming an accentrate Kingdom of the Two Sicilies – was the largest and most demographically and culturally developed of the Italian states. Nobles were many, powerful and with many titles: it was one of the few states that used the title of Prince (Principe) as a title of nobility, being why in the mostly incomplete list below Marquessates are divided according to the house and line to which they belong, identifying the line with its main title. Succession is by eldest male.

- House d'Aquino, Princes of Caramanico: Marquess of Francolise and Marquess of Castelnuovo;
- House d'Avalos, Princes of Holy Roman Empire: Marquess of Pescara and Marquess of the Vasto;
- House Capece Minutolo, Dukes of San Valentino, second line: Marquess of Bugnano (Capece Minutolo Princes of Canosa also exist);
- House Caracciolo, family Caracciolo-Rossi:
  - line of Princes of Avellino: Marquess of Sanseverino;
  - line of Princes of Torella: Marquess of Valle Siciliana and Marquess of Monacilioni;
  - line of the Princes of Spinoso: Marquess of Laterza and Marquess of Guardia Perticara;
  - line of Dukes of Laurino: Marquess of San Marco dei Cavoti;
- House Caracciolo, family Caracciolo-Pisquizi:
  - line of Princes of Marano: Marquess of Barisciano;
  - line of Princes of Melissano: Marquess of Amorosi and Marquess of Taviano;
  - line of Princes of Cellamare: Marquess of Alfedena;
  - line of Princes Caracciolo Carafa: Marquess of Santeramo and Marquess of Cervinara;
- House Carafa, line Carafa della Spina Princes of Roccella: Marquess of Brancaleone and Marquess of Castelvetere;
- House Carafa, line Carafa della Stadera Dukes of Andria: Marquess of Corato;
- House Imperiali, Princes of Francavilla: Marquess of Oyra (Grand of Spain) and Marquess of Latiano;
- House de Vargas Machuca, Dukes of Vargas Machuca: Marquess of San Vicente (Grand of Spain) and Marquess of Valtolla;
- House Campolattaro, family dAgistino-Campolattaro: Marquess of Campolattaro. Castello dCampolattaro.
- House Pucci: Marquess of Barsento (created by Philip IV, King of Spain 1664)

== List of marquesses in Sicily ==
The Kingdom of Sicily was founded in 1282 and ended in 1816 when it was succeeded by the unified Kingdom of Two Sicilies (and since 1859 by the even more unified Kingdom of Italy). Sicilian Nobility, during these centuries, got much power and many titles, up to that of Prince. Only a few existing titles of Marquess are listed hereafter, in alphabetical order of the houses bearing them, indicating also the line and their main title. The list is thus mostly incomplete.

- house Alliata (9 titles of Prince): Marquess of Santa Lucia;
- house de Gregorio (Princes of Saint Theodore): Marquess;
- house Lanza (Princes of Trabia): Marquess of Militello, Marquess of Barrafranca, Marquess of the Ginestra (of the Broom), Marquess of Misuraca, Contessa Caterina Fudara (Misuraca) (1555 - 1633)(Neapolitan title);
- house Paternò (line of Dukes of Roccaromana): Marquess of the Toscano;
- house Paternò (family Paternò Castello, line of San Giuliano): Marquess of San Giuliano;
- house Paternò (family Paternò Ventimiglia, line of Regiovanni): Marquess of Regiovanni;
- house Paternò (line of Dukes of San Nicola): Marquess;
- house Salvo: Marquess of Pietraganzili
- house Stagno (princes of Alcontres): Marquess of Roccalumera and Soreto;
- house Starrabba (Princes of Giardinelli and Militello): Marquess of St. Agatha;
- house Trigona (whose 1st line are Princes of Sant'Elia), 3rd line: Marquess of Canicarao; Marquess of Dainammare.

== Sources ==
Sardinia

- Vacca Odone, Enrico (1898). "Part 16: Elenco dei comuni e luoghi dell'isola di Sardegna, divisi per giudicati, con indicazione della regione e degli antichi feudi e feudatarj cui appartenevano nell'epoca del riscatto feudale, nel 1838" [List of Sardinian localities divided per Giudicatos with fiefs and feudal lords to whom they belonged at the time of redemption of fiefs]. Itinerario-guida ufficiale dell'isola di Sardegna [Official itinerary and guide of the island of Sardinia] (in Italian). Cagliari: Meloni e Aitelli.
- Scano, Dionigi (2003) [1942]. "Appendix 2. La nobiltà sarda" [The Sardinian Nobility]. Donna Francesca di Zatrillas (in Italian) (new edition of "Donna Francesca di Zatrillas, marchesa di Laconi e di Siete Fuentes", in Archivio storico sardo, 1942 ed.). Sassari: La biblioteca della Nuova Sardegna. ISBN 84-9789-069-8.
- "Part 3. Memoria de cuantos titulos concedieron los Serenissimos Reyes de Aragon, y despues los de la Serenissima Casa de Saboya en el Reyno de Sardeña; empezando del Rey Don Pedro IV hasta el año presente 1790" [Memory of those titles the most serene kings of Aragon and afterwards of the most serene house of Savoy granted in the kingdom of Sardinia, beginning since the king don Peter IV up to the present year 1790]. Origen del Cavallerato y de la Nobleza de varias Familias del Reyno de Cerdeña [Origin of the knighthood and nobility of various families from the kingdom of Sardinia] (in Spanish). edition promoted by the Associazione nobiliare araldica genealogica regionale della Sardegna, introduction by Vincenzo Amat di San Filippo (manuscript Amat ed.). Cagliari: Libreria Cocco. 1977 [1775–1790].
- Associazione nobiliare araldica genealogica regionale della Sardegna, ed. (1993). Elenco nobiliare sardo [List of Sardinian Nobles] (updated in Statuto e Elenco Nobiliare Sardo (link on the left), then in Elenco nobiliare sardo aggiornato) (in Italian). Sassari: Delfino.
- Floris, Francesco (1996). Feudi e feudatari in Sardegna [Fiefs and feudal lords in Sardinia] (in Italian). Vol. 1 and 2. foreword by Bruno Anatra. Cagliari: Della Torre. ISBN 88-7343-288-3.
- Floris, Francesco; Serra, Sergio (1986). Storia della nobiltà in Sardegna. Genealogia e araldica delle famiglie nobili sarde [History of nobility in Sardinia. Genealogy and heraldry of Sardinian noble families] (in Italian). Foreword by Alberto Boscolo. Cagliari: Della Torre.
- Casula, Francesco Cesare (2006). "Marchese". Dizionario storico sardo. Vol. 7. Cagliari: L'unione sarda. p. 2014.

Rome

- Caffarelli, Giovanpietro (October 1982). "I marchesi romani di baldacchino" (PDF). Bollettino Ufficiale del Corpo della Nobiltà Italiana. Corpo della Nobiltà Italiana. Archived from the original (PDF) on 24 January 2009.

Venice

- Corpo della Nobiltà Italiana (2001). Associazione nobiliare regionale veneta (ed.). Famiglie nobili delle Venezie [Noble families of the "Venices"] (in Italian). Udine: Gaspari. ISBN 88-86338-67-8.

Modena and Reggio Parma and Piacenza

- Associazione nobiliare regionale di Modena e Reggio, ed. (2007). Elenco nobiliare di Modena e Reggio e di Parma e Piacenza [List of Nobles from Modena and Reggio and from Parma and Piacenza] (in Italian). Sassari: Delfino. ISBN 978-88-7138-443-6.

Whole Italy, including pre-unitarian States

- Collegio araldico (1990–1994). Libro d'oro della nobiltà italiana (Golden Book of Italian Nobility). Vol. 21–22. Rome. pp. XLIII + 909 + 909 https://web.archive.org/web/20161219113821/http://www.collegio-araldico.it/librodoro.html. Archived from the original on 19 December 2016.
