= Giovanni Marghinotti =

Italian painter (1798–1865)

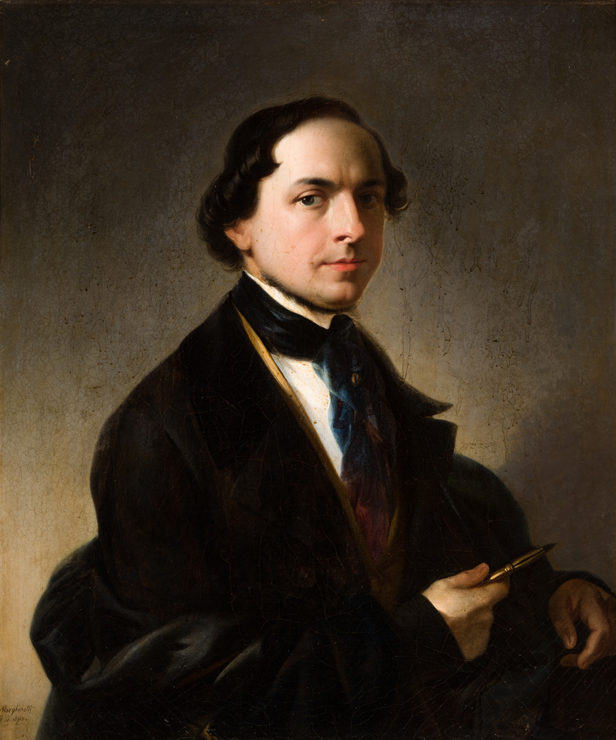
Self-portrait (c.1830)

Giovanni Marghinotti (7 January 1798 – 20 January 1865) was an Italian painter in the Neoclassical style.

== Biography ==
He was born in Cagliari. His father Vincenzo was a craftsman, originally from Trapani, who worked hard to provide his four sons with professional educations. His brothers became a Jesuit priest, an engineer, and a lawyer. He was launched on an artistic career when his talent was noticed by Stefano Manca, the second Marquis of Villahermosa. Through the Marquis' influence, he obtained a Royal Patent that enabled him to attend the French Academy in Rome, beginning in 1819. His primary instructor there was Jean-Baptiste Wicar. He also studied with Gaspare Landi.

He married Felicita Puccini, from Ferentino, in 1825. Four years later, he had his first exhibition, in Turin. That same year, he received his first major commission: a huge allegorical canvas of King Charles Felix of Sardinia as a protector of the arts, for the Town Hall in Cagliari. In 1834, he decided to return to his home town and open a studio. Over the next decade, he received numerous commissions from royal and ecclesiastical authorities, which included large canvases for the cathedral there, as well as ones in Ozieri, Sassari and Oristano.

In 1842, he was appointed an honorary member of the Accademia Albertina in Turin. Two years later, he was named a "Virtuoso of Merit" at the Accademia dei Virtuosi al Pantheon in Rome and, in 1845, became a court painter for King Charles Albert. The following year, he was awarded a chair in drawing at the Albertina, which led him to live in Turin for ten years. There, he made contacts with the Spanish Royal Court and, in 1852, was named a Knight in the Order of Charles III.

A reorganization at the Albertina led to his retirement from there in 1856. Due to the possibility of armed conflict with Austria, he decided to return to Cagliari and reestablish his old contacts. This was not a popular decision with his family, as his son Angelo was about to begin a career as a painter in Turin. Attempts to create Cagliari's first painting and drawing school were unsuccessful, but he became a popular portrait painter for the nobility. He died there, shortly after his sixty-seventh birthday.

== Selected paintings ==
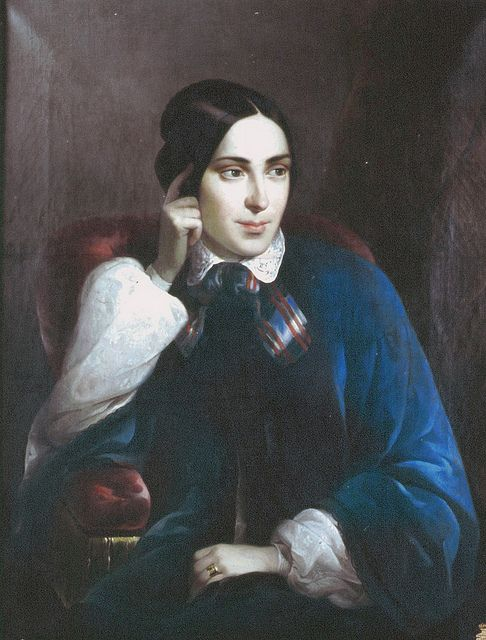
Adelaide of Austria, Queen of Sardinia

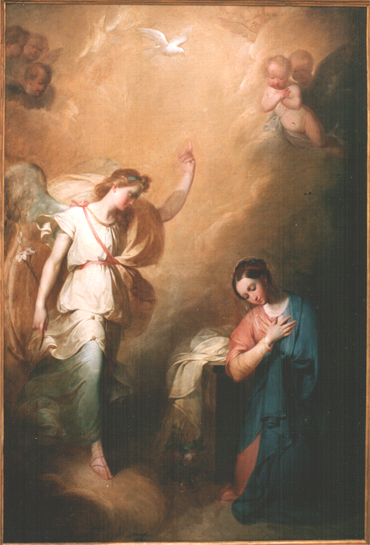
The Annunciation

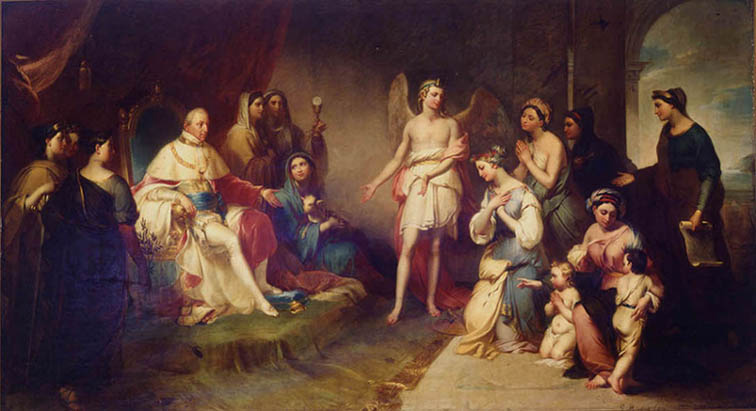
Charles Felix, Protector of the Fine Arts

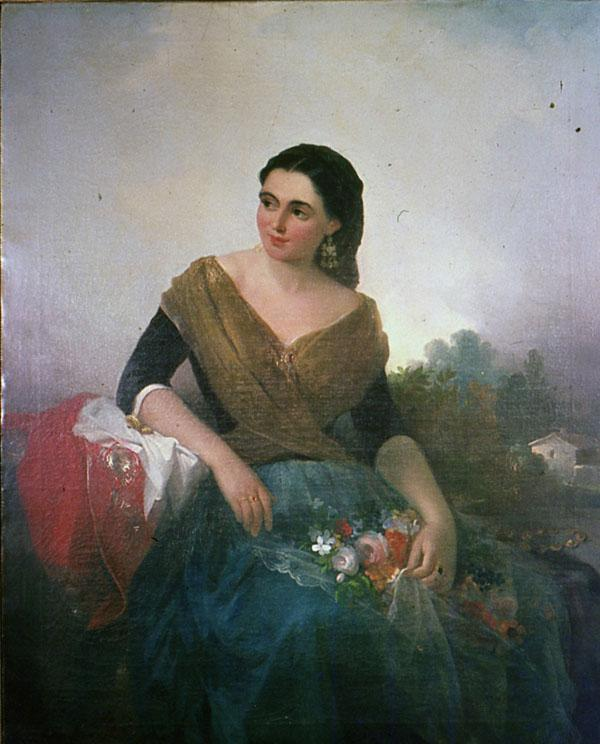
The Bread Seller of Cagliari

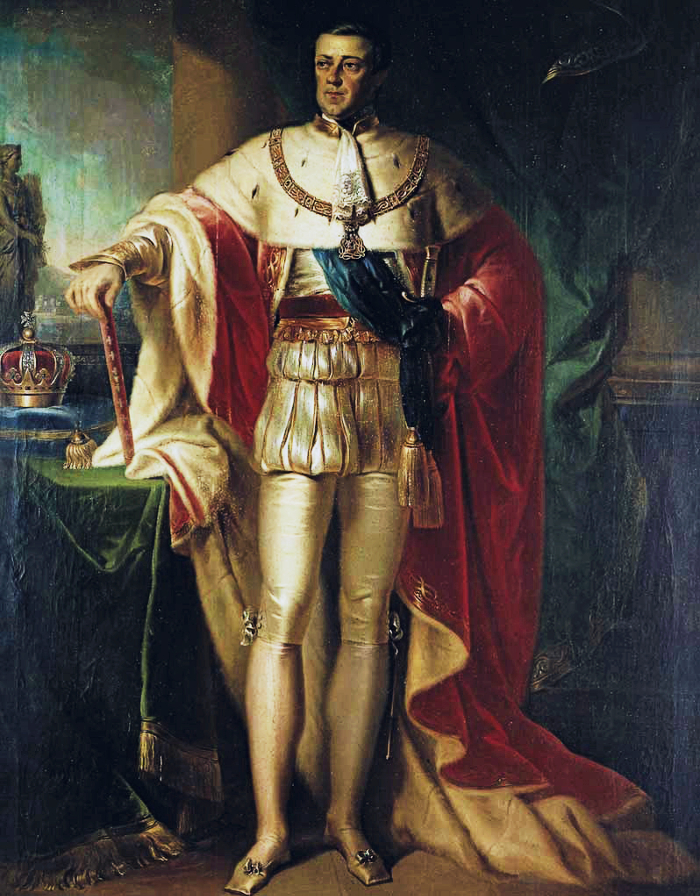
King Charles Albert of Sardinia
