= Marquis of Saint Charles =

Marquis of St. Charles (also spelled as Marquess of Saint-Charles) is a title granted in 1754 by Charles Emmanuel III of Savoy, king of Sardinia, to Sardinian feudal Lord James Borro (in Spanish: Jayme Borro, in Italian: Giacomo Borro). It has passed afterwards to the house Palici and eventually to Cugias.

== The grant ==
The title was granted to Jayme Borro in 1754, following a transaction of 1752, on a fief acquired by his father Juan Baptista Borro in 1712. The fief consisted in the unpopulated village of Zuradili, the mounts of Monti de Cheddos and the village of Marrubiu.

The Marquis had full judicial authority both in civil and criminal cases within the fief (mero e misto imperio) and owned the fief as an allod.

== The inheritance ==
Sardinian feudal titles could be granted more Italiae (according to the use of Italy) or more Cathaluniae (according to the use of Catalonia), and the main difference was the inheritance through males only (as today for most English titles) or males and females (as today for the British Crown). Although usually grants were more Italiae, most fiefs successions were later extended to females in case of lack of males. This was also the case of the Marquessate of St. Charles, which was owned as an allod and which therefore passed three times to the sister of the holder (numbers 3, 5 and 8 in next paragraph). Succession law was changed in 1926, when the Kingdom of Italy finally adopted a common law for all its titles, starting since the 7 September 1926. If the 8th Marchioness died before that date, the old law applies and the title would be transmitted to her descent, actually another line of the Cugias. Otherwise the new law would have prevented a succession in the female line and the title would have become extinct at the death of the Marchioness. The date of her death is not published. The private association called Corpo della Nobiltà Italiana recognize the title to the heir of the eighth Marchioness.

== List of Marquesses of St. Charles ==
1. Giacomo Borro, 1st Marquess of St. Charles (born 1698), 1754; married Giovanna Servent;
2. Francesco Borro, 2nd Marquess of St. Charles (born 1732), son of the latter, 1754-1794; married Margherita Moro, without surviving issue;
3. Maria Imbenia Borro, 3rd Marchioness of St. Charles suo jure (born ?), sister of the latter, 1794-1835; married Antonio Ignazio Palici di Suni (Paliacio);
4. Giovanni Antonio Palici di Suni, 4th Marquess of St. Charles (born 1793), son of the latter, 1835-1860; last feudal lord, unmarried;
5. Giovanna Palici di Suni, 5th Marchioness of St. Charles suo jure (born ?), sister of the latter, 1860-?; married Gavino Cugia, Marquess of St. Ursula;
6. Giovanni Battista Cugia, 6th Marquess of St. Charles, Marquess of St. Ursula (born 1809), son of the latter, ?-?; married Gerolama Quesada of the Marquesses of St. Sebastian;
7. Gavino Cugia, 7th Marquess of St. Charles, Marquess of St. Ursula (born 1839), son of the latter, ?-1917; unmarried;
8. Giulia Cugia, 8th Marchioness of St. Charles and Marchioness of St. Ursula suo jure (born 1845), sister of the latter, 1917-?; married Francesco Cugia of the Marquesses of St. Ursula and St. Charles, her second cousin twice removed.

Should the title pass through the female line of the eighth marchioness, other holders would be:

1. Diego Cugia, maybe 9th Marquess of St. Charles, Marquess of St. Ursula (born 1875), son of the latter, ?-1919; married Eugenia Lucernari;
2. Francesco Cugia, maybe 10th Marquess of St. Charles, Marquess of St. Ursula (born 1916), son of the latter, 1919-1992; married Giulia Schininà of the Barons of St. Elijah;

In that case, present holder would be the latter's son, called Diego, Marquess of St. Ursula and a well-known author, with his eldest son as heir apparent.

== See also ==
- Marquesses in Sardinia

== Bibliography ==
- Francesco Floris, Feudi e feudatari in Sardegna (in Italian; meaning Fiefs and feudal lords in Sardinia), Cagliari, Della Torre, 1996, pp. 258–259 and 652. ISBN 8873432883.
