= Marquis of San Sperate =

Marquis of San Sperate is a title granted in 1749 by Charles Emmanuel III of Savoy, king of Sardinia, to Sardinian judge and nobleman Joseph Cadello (in Italian: Giuseppe Cadello). It has passed afterwards to the house Ripoll and eventually to Sanjusts.

== The grant ==
The title was conferred over the village of San Sperate, bought by the judge Joseph Cadello from the treasury in 1742.

== The inheritance ==
The title passed over to the grantee's descent up to date, with some indirect passages and three female inheritances.

== List of Marquesses of San Sperate ==
1. Joseph Cadello Cugia, 1st Marquess of San Sperate (born 1693), 1749–1792; unmarried;
2. Sadorro (in English: Saturn or Saturnin) Cadello Cadello, 2nd Marquess of San Sperate (born 1733), nephew of the latter as son of a sister died before him, and of a first cousin once removed, 1792–1813; brother of Cardinal Diego Cadello; married Clara Martinez of the Marquesses of Montemuros;
3. Efisio Cadello Asquer, 3rd Marquess of San Sperate (born 1788), nephew of the latter as son of a brother died before him, 1813–1846; unmarried; during his rule the fief was "redeemed";
4. Anna Maria Cadello Asquer, 4th Marchioness of San Sperate suo jure (born 1789), sister of the latter, 1846–1848; married Pietro Ripoll, 3rd Marquess of Neoneli;
5. Maria Angela Ripoll Cadello, 5th Marchioness of San Sperate suo jure, Marchioness of Neoneli, etc. (born 1815), sister of the latter, 1848–1850; m. don Carlo Sanjust, Baron of Teulada;
6. Enrico Sanjust Ripoll, 6th Marquess of San Sperate, Baron of Teulada etc. (born 1839), son of the latter, 1850–1910;
7. Luigi Sanjust Ripoll, 7th Marquess of San Sperate etc. (born 1844), brother of the latter, 1910–1915; m. Maria Francesca Aymerich of the Marquesses of Laconi;
8. Giuseppe Sanjust Ripoll, 8th Marquess of San Sperate etc. (born 1849), brother of the latter, 1915–1923; m. Maria Sanjust of the barons of Teulada;
9. Carlo Sanjust Sanjust, 9th Marquess of San Sperate etc. (born 1878), son of the latter, 1923–1964; m. Olga Mattiolo;
10. Francesco Sanjust Mattiolo, 10th Marquess of San Sperate etc. (born 1926), son of the latter, 1964–2014; m. Angela Lodrini;

Present holder is the brother of the latter, called Ignazio, with his only son as heir apparent.

== See also ==
- Marquesses in Sardinia
- Marquis of Neoneli

== Bibliography ==
- Origen del Cavallerato y de la Nobleza de varias Familias del Reyno de Cerdeña manuscript Amat 1775–1790 (in Spanish; meaning Origin of the knighthood and nobility of various families from the kingdom of Sardinia), introduction by Vincenzo Amat, Associazione nobiliare araldica genealogica regionale della Sardegna, Cagliari, Libreria Cocco, 1977, entries Cadello, Ripoll and Sanjust.
- Francesco Floris and Sergio Serra, Storia della nobiltà in Sardegna. Genealogia e araldica delle famiglie nobili sarde (in Italian; meaning History of nobility in Sardinia. Genealogy and heraldry of Sardinian noble families), Cagliari, Della Torre, 1986, entries Cadello, Ripoll and Sanjust.
- Francesco Floris, Feudi e feudatari in Sardegna (in Italian; meaning Fiefs and feudal lords in Sardinia), Cagliari, Della Torre, 1996, pp. 289–293 and 555–556. ISBN 8873432883.
