= Marquis of Neoneli =

Marquis of Neoneli is a title granted in 1774 by Victor Amadeus III of Savoy, king of Sardinia, to Sardinian nobleman Pedro Ripoll (in Italian: Pietro Ripoll). It has passed afterwards to the house Sanjust.

== The grant ==
The title was conferred over the villages of Neoneli, Ula and Ardauli, the surrounding Basala mountains, lands (saltos) of Tollinaro, Borte and Lochele in the Barigadu susu and the fisheries of Marceddì and Rio Maggiore in Oristano, all those in Iglesias and that of Piscinalonga in the poll of Cagliari; but with limited jurisdiction out of the villages.

== The inheritance ==
The title passed over to the grantee's descent up to date.

== List of Marquesses of Neoneli ==
1. Pedro Ripoll Manca, 1st Marquess of Neoneli and Count of Tuili (born 1709), 1774-1775; married Juana Asquer of the Viscounts of Flumini;
2. Manuel Ripoll Asquer, 2nd Marquess of Neoneli etc. (born 1750), son of the latter, 1775–1802; m. 1st Juana Nin of the Marquesses of St. Thomas and 2nd Josefa Zapata of the Barons of Las Plassas;
3. Pietro Ripoll Nin, 3rd Marquess of Neoneli etc. (born 1798), son of the latter by first marriage, 1802–1822; m. Anna Maria Cadello, later Marchioness of San Sperate suo jure;
4. Emanuele Ripoll Cadello, 4th Marquess of Neoneli etc. (born 1817), son of the latter, 1822–1823;
5. Maria Angela Ripoll Cadello, 5th Marchioness of Neoneli suo jure, Marchioness of San Sperate, etc. (born 1815), sister of the latter, 1823–1850; m. don Carlo Sanjust, Baron of Teulada; under her rule, the fiefs were "redeemed";
6. Enrico Sanjust Ripoll, 6th Marquess of Neoneli, Baron of Teulada etc. (born 1839), son of the latter, 1850–1910;
7. Luigi Sanjust Ripoll, 7th Marquess of Neoneli etc. (born 1844), brother of the latter, 1910–1915; m. Maria Francesca Aymerich of the Marquesses of Laconi;
8. Giuseppe Sanjust Ripoll, 8th Marquess of Neoneli etc. (born 1849), brother of the latter, 1915–1923; m. Maria Sanjust of the barons of Teulada;
9. Carlo Sanjust Sanjust, 9th Marquess of Neoneli etc. (born 1878), son of the latter, 1923–1964; m. Olga Mattiolo;
10. Francesco Sanjust Mattiolo, 10th Marquess of Neoneli etc. (born 1926), son of the latter, 1964–2014; m. Angela Lodrini;
11. Ignazio Sanjust Mattiolo, 11th Marquess of Neoneli etc. (born 1932), brother of the latter, 2014–2020; m. Pia Bonfoco.

Present holder is the only son of the latter, called Carlo Alberto, with a second cousin as heir presumptive.

== See also ==
- Marquesses in Sardinia
- Marquis of San Sperate

== Bibliography ==
- Origen del Cavallerato y de la Nobleza de varias Familias del Reyno de Cerdeña manuscript Amat 1775–1790 (in Spanish; meaning Origin of the knighthood and nobility of various families from the kingdom of Sardinia), introduction by Vincenzo Amat, Associazione nobiliare araldica genealogica regionale della Sardegna, Cagliari, Libreria Cocco, 1977, ad vocem
- Dionigi Scano, "Appendix 2. La nobiltà sarda" [The Sardinian Nobility]. Donna Francesca di Zatrillas (in Italian) (new edition of "Donna Francesca di Zatrillas, marchesa di Laconi e di Siete Fuentes", in Archivio storico sardo, 1942 ed.). Sassari: La biblioteca della Nuova Sardegna, 2003. ISBN 84-9789-069-8
- Francesco Floris and Sergio Serra, Storia della nobiltà in Sardegna. Genealogia e araldica delle famiglie nobili sarde (in Italian; meaning History of nobility in Sardinia. Genealogy and heraldry of Sardinian noble families), Cagliari, Della Torre, 1986, ad vocem.
- Francesco Floris, Feudi e feudatari in Sardegna (in Italian; meaning Fiefs and feudal lords in Sardinia), Cagliari, Della Torre, 1996, pp. 412–415 and 614–618. ISBN 8873432883.
