= Corpo della Nobiltà Italiana =

Italian private association

The Corpo della nobiltà italiana (Italian, 'Body of the Italian Nobility'), sometimes referred to as CNI, is a private association established in 1957 to protect heraldic and nobility rights of Italian nobles after the republican constitution (promulgated in 1947) put an end to official recognition of nobility and noble titles.

== Background ==
=== Italian nobility ===
Italy became a single state during the Risorgimento. In 1861, the Parliament of the Kingdom of Sardinia, including for the first time representatives from all Italian territories then annexed to the Kingdom, proclaimed: "King Victor Emmanuel adopts for himself and his successors the title of King of Italy". The Sardinian constitution, which remained in force for the whole of Italy, (Note: By that time, Italy encompassed most of the peninsula, except for Latium (the present provinces of Viterbo, Rome, Latina and Frosinone, which were the remnants of the Papal State) and the present regions of Trentino-Alto Adige, Veneto and Friuli-Venezia Giulia, which were part of the Austrian Empire. The Veneto and the Friuli were annexed in 1866, the Latium in 1870, the Trentino-Alto Adige and the Venezia Giulia in 1918−1919 after World War I. Istria, part of Venezia Giulia, passed afterwards to Yugoslavia in 1945 after World War II.) stated that “Nobility titles are maintained to those who have right to them. (Note: Article 79.) Thus, unified Italy had a multiplicity of nobility laws, particular to each pre-unification State. This diversity led its College of Arms, called Consulta araldica ('heraldic council'), to be organized in several regional commissions, each corresponding approximately to a pre-unification state, able to apply the particular codes of nobility. Halting efforts to homogenize the nobility codes began as late as 1926, when female succession, still valid in the former kingdoms of Naples, Sicily and Sardinia (only the island of Sardinia, not Piedmont), was abolished.

Titles could be granted to the eldest male heir (male primogeniture, as in Frankish tradition), to all male heirs (as in Langobard tradition), or to all family members. Regardless of the regional tradition, the condition of nobility was also conferred to all the immediate relations of a titleholder. Where only the eldest male heir inherited titles, family members are indicated as "Noble of the [title of the eldest male] (plural)". For example, if one Mr. Rossi is granted the title "Baron of Esempio", whose succession is restricted to male primogeniture, the daughters and younger sons of Mr. Rossi may designate themselves as "Mr. Antonio Rossi, Noble of the Barons of Esempio and Miss Valentina Rossi, Noble of the Barons of Esempio", and this same designation may apply to all of his descendants by the male line.

Official lists of all Italian families and noble people were published in 1921 and 1933.

=== Nobility under the republic ===
Following the establishment of the Italian Republic in June 1946, the new constitution came into effect on January 1, 1948. It stated, "Nobility tiles are not recognized", and in consequence that they are “out of the world of law”. According to a 1967 decision by the Constitutional Court of Italy, this was interpreted to mean titles cannot be used in public administration, nor may courts of law acknowledge their existence. Their use by individuals is not forbidden, but nor does the state enforce restrictions on their use within proscribed boundaries, as previous codes of nobility maintained.

== The Association ==
In opposition to this lack of social safeguards, some Italian aristocrats founded in 1955−1957 the Corpo della Nobiltà Italiana, with the intention of protecting the historical and heraldic rights of Italian nobles. The word “heraldic” is always used by the CNI lato sensu, that is, considering all functions, rights, and duties of noble office, not only those relating to heraldry.

The first officers were:

- Prince Emilio Guasco Gallarati, Marquis of Bisio, chairman;
- Marquis Don Annibale Brivio Sforza, Marquis of Santa Maria in Prato, vice-chairman;
- Don Enrico Amat of the Marquesses of St. Philip, vice-chairman;
- Prince and Marquis Don Alerame Pallavicino, chancellor;
- Baron Alessandro Monti della Corte, treasurer.

Some years later, the association merged with the previously established Unione della Nobiltà Italiana (UNI, Union of Italian Nobility), founded on the example of the French Association d'entraide de la noblesse française (ANF).

=== Tasks ===
The CNI aims to keep up to date the official list of Italian nobles, applying rigorously the appropriate laws of nobility, based on the last official list published by the Kingdom of Italy, the Ordinamento dello stato nobiliare italiano (Organization of the Italian Nobility), from 1943. (Note: Approved through Royal Decree N. 651 dated 7 June 1943. Its text can be found here.) (Republican governments since then, in compliance with the constitution, have shown no interest in publishing an updated version.)

People entitled to be inscribed are: 1 – those already inscribed in the official registrars; 2 – those who had a grant of a nobility title (including the mere title of Noble) after the publication of the lists; 3 – legitimate and natural issue of the latter, meaning descendants which are both legitimate, excluding children born out of lawful wedlock, and natural, excluding adopted children, (children whose parents married after their birth are considered as fully legitimate as for the purposes of this list); 4 – illegitimately born children in whose act of legitimacy the succession in nobility titles is expressly provided (this could only happen during the kingdom); 5 – those who prove their descent by a man who had not been included in the lists at that time, but whose right is proven according to the applicable rules.

Other aims are mutual assistance among nobles and social events for young nobles.

=== Membership ===
Only nobles can be part of the CNI. Some regional associations allow also wives of nobles, not noble themselves by birth, according to the fact that the wife follows the husband's nobility condition. Due to the same rule, CNI states that noblewomen by birth cannot be elected to any office while married to a non-noble man.

=== Organization ===
==== At local level ====
The CNI is composed of 14 regional Nobility associations, reflecting the organization of the Heraldic Council (consulta araldica) in the Kingdom of Italy. Each one is autonomous and has a proper statute.

They are:

1. Piedmont (including Aosta Valley)
2. Liguria
3. Lombardy
4. Veneto (including Friuli)
5. Trentino (presently not operating)
6. Julian March, Istria and Dalmatia
7. Parma and Piacenza
8. Modena and Reggio
9. Tuscany
10. Romagne (Papal Emilia and the whole Romagna)
11. Latium, Umbria and Marches
12. Neapolitan provinces: they include Campania, Abruzzo, Molise, Apulia, Basilicata and Calabria
13. Sardinia (Note: The association of Sardinia seceded from the CNI in 2010.)
14. Sicily

Each association elects either a council or commission for Heraldry-Genealogy. A commission is composed of 6 to 21 members, and is charged with compiling the regional nobility registry and assessing requests of inscriptions. Each commission elects within its members a chairman, a vice-chairman, a secretary, a delegate to the Central heraldic body and a vice-delegate. Councils are composed of a president, a vice-president, a chancellor, a treasurer, other councilors and the representative of the youth club, but otherwise there is no functional difference between councils and commissions in their roles or duties.

==== At central level ====
The CNI itself is governed by a National heraldic council (Consiglio araldico nazionale, sometimes referred to as CAN), composed by all members of regional commissions and the president of the youth club. This body elects officers and decides important matters, and those that concern multiple regions.

The CAN elects a chairman, six vice-chairmen, a chancellor, a treasurer and the representative in the CILANE.

Certain issues concerning nobility, chiefly the rights to titles (including the mere title of noble), are decided by a Central heraldic body (Giunta araldica centrale, sometimes referred to as GAC), composed of the 14 delegates of the regional commissions. They elect a chairman from among all members of regional commissions, and one (sometimes two) vice-chairman.

All CNI members aged less than 35 years are part of the CNI Youth club (Corpo della nobiltà italiana - circolo giovanile, also called referred to as CNI-CG.) They elect a president, a vice-president, a secretary, a treasurer and the CILANE youth delegate and appoint a delegate in each regional association among its young members.

In the case of disputes between associates, the CAN elects a Court of Honor (as it presides over matters relating to honor and reputation; in Italian, Corte d'onore), composed of three ordinary members and two deputies that are qualified experts in law. Ordinary members elect one among themselves as chairman.

The overall CNI ruling body is the Board of Directors (ufficio di presidenza, sometimes referred to as UP), composed of:

CAN chairman;
CAN 6 vice-chairmen;
CAN chancellor;
CAN treasurer;
CAN delegate to the CILANE;
GAC chairman;
Chairman of the Court of honour;
President of the youth club, whenever youth issues are discussed.

=== Claims to Authority ===
The CNI considers itself to be not one Italian nobility association among others, but as the definitive and authoritative nobility association within the country. This claim is supported by the following factors:

- The late king in exile, Humbert II, still considered to be the fons honorum as the last legitimate sovereign, gave the association his approval with regards to the task of recognizing nobility titles;
- A majority Italian nobles recognize its role and duties;
- In recognition of titles, they strictly apply the existing codes of nobility of Italy (which the Italian Republic never declared as illegitimate, but simply elected not to safeguard.) Meaning that, should the state ever begin again to recognize nobility titles, their application of the codes would lead (hypothetically) exactly to the same categorizations made by the CNI.

Not all observers share this view. Nevertheless, the CNI considers its role to be important as a representative of Italian nobles, and is recognized by the CILANE, which recognizes the Corpo della nobiltà Italiana as their only Italian member. Close cooperation with the Order of Malta also affirms CNI authority in questions of nobility.

=== List of chairmen ===
- Prince Don Emilio Guasco Gallarati, (Note: Emilio being the first name and Guasco Gallarati a double surname.) Marquis of Bisio, Noble of Alessandria;
- Marquis Don Annibale Brivio Sforza, (Note: Annibale being the first name and Brivio Sforza a double surname.) Marquis of Santa Maria in Prato, Patrician of Milan;
- Don Giovan Pietro of Dukes Caffarelli, Patrician of Rome (until 1997);
- Don Gabrio Visconti, Marquis of San Vito, Patrician of Milan (1997);
- Count Don Gaetano Barbiano, count and lord of Belgiojoso, Patrician of Milan (since 1998);
- Marquis Doimo Frangipane di Strassoldo, (Note: Doimo being the first name and Frangipane and Strassoldo a double surname.) Lord of Castel Porpetto, Patrician of Rome (until 2007);
- Luigi Michelini of Counts of San Martino with Rivalta (2007−2012).

== See also ==
- Consulta araldica
- List of Marquesses in Italy
- Nobile (aristocracy)
- Nobility of Italy

== Sources ==
Michelini di San Martino, Luigi (2010). "C.I.L.A.N.E. et C.N.I.: que signifient-ils ces deux acronymes pour les nobles italiens? Un demi-siècle au service de la noblesse". Notiziario dell'Associazione nobiliare regionale veneta – Rivista di studi storici – Nuova serie (in French). II (2). La Musa Talìa: 7–23.
