= Duke of Vallombrosa =

Duke of Vallombrosa (French: duc de Vallombrosa e duc dell´Asinara, marquis de Morès e de Montemaggiore) was a title created for the House of Manca. The present holder is disputed.

== History ==
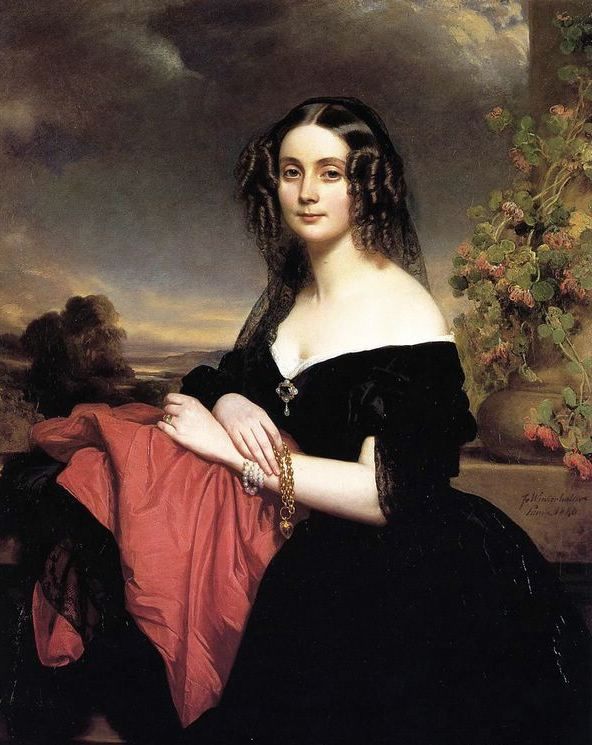
Portrait of the Duchess of Vallombrosa (née Claire Galard de Béarn)

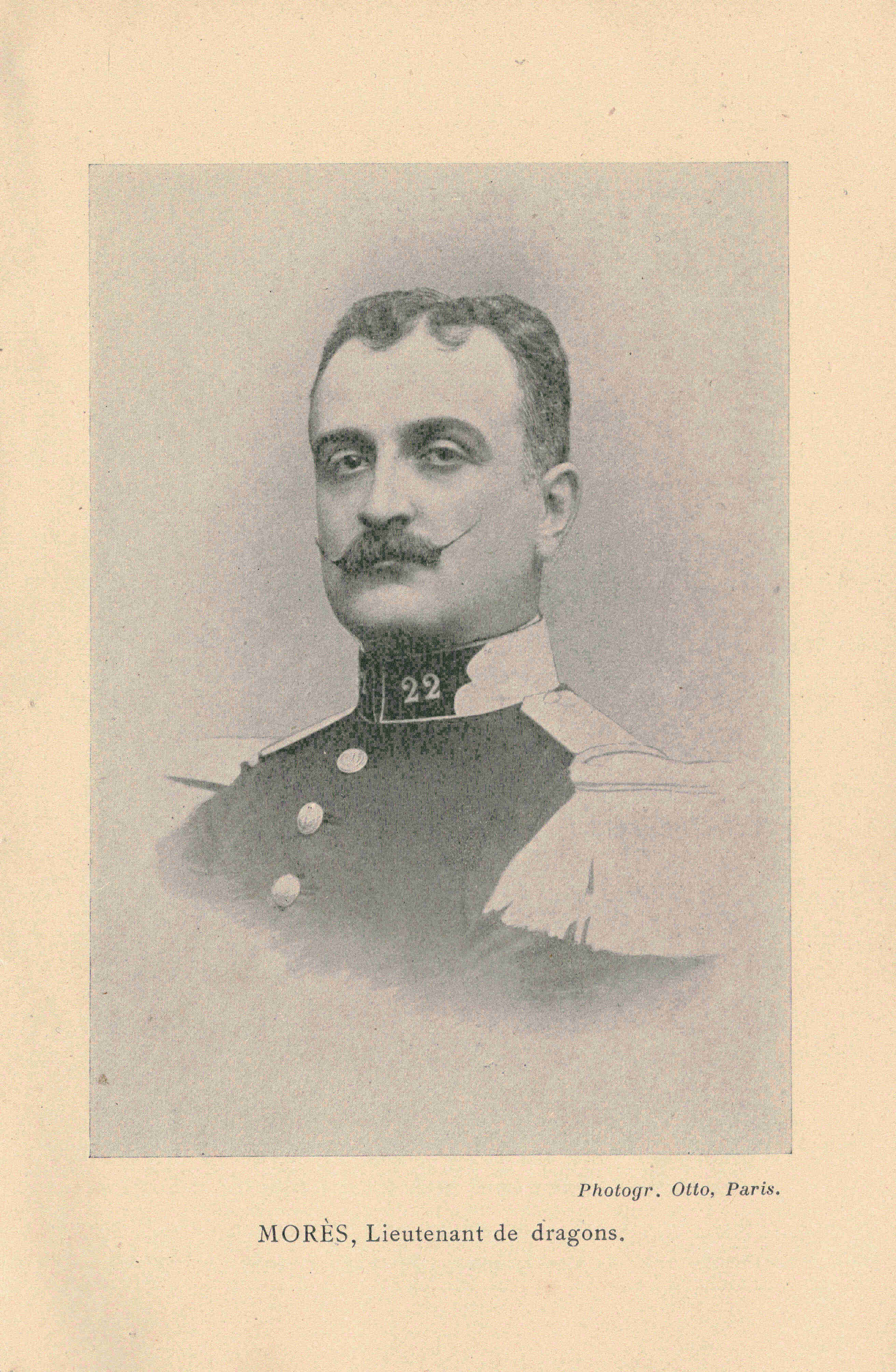
Marquis de Morès

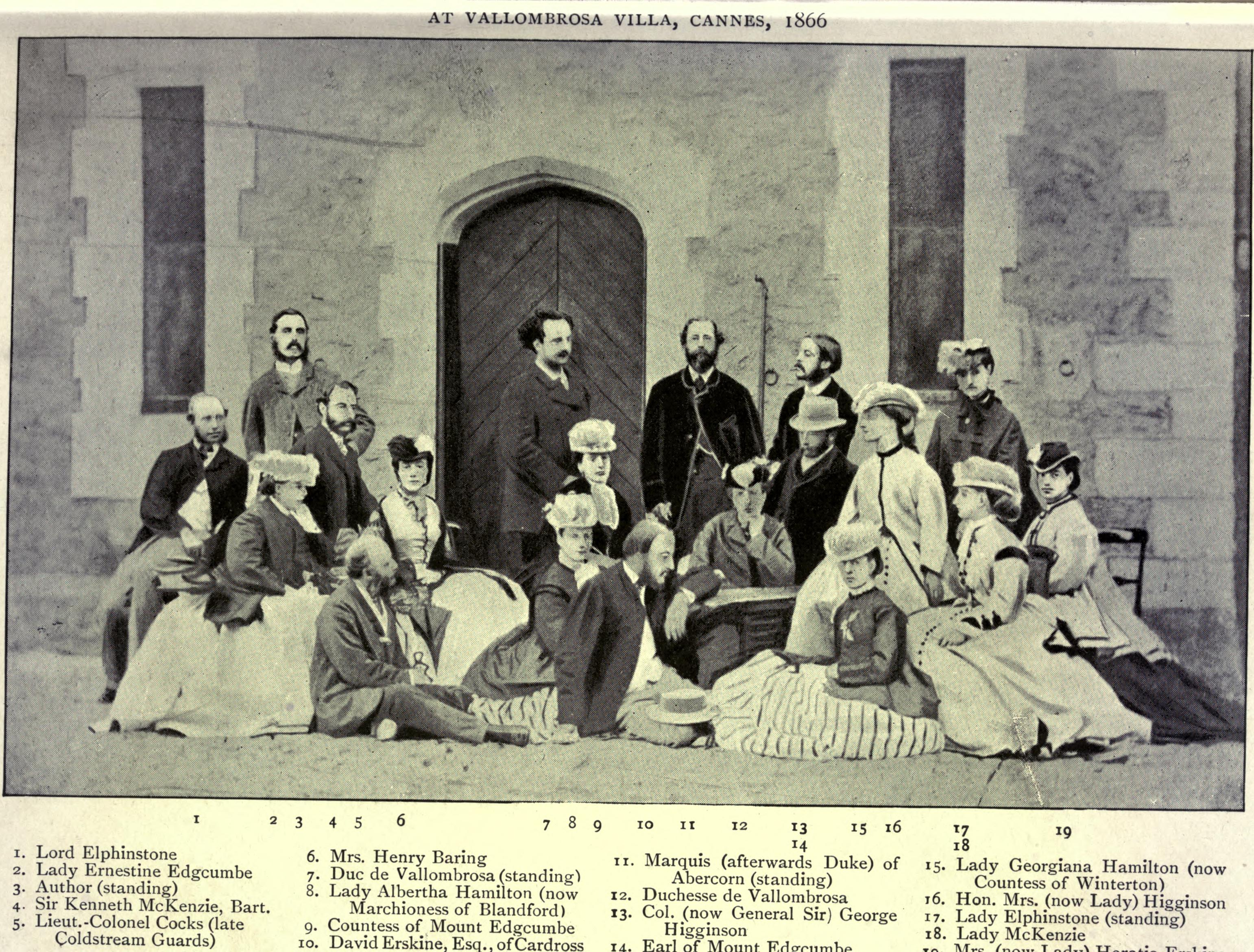
The Duke and Duchess of Vallombrosa, among others, at Château Vallombrosa in Cannes, 1866.

The Dukes of Vallombrosa trace their origins back to Jayme Manca (d. 1300), an ally of James II of Aragon; they were made lords of the Morès and the Montemaggiore in the Kingdom of Sardinia in 1450. His descendants continued to distinguish themselves, including against the Moors, and were honored by King Ferdinand and Queen Isabella of Castile.

=== Marquessates ===
In 1614, the Marquessate of Morès in the Kingdom of Sardinia was created for Caterina Manca. (Note: The year 1614 is referred to by D. Scano; F. Floris says once 1614 too and once 1616 (while in the Floris-Serra he had said 1644), Origen says 1654 and Elenco says 1656.) The Marquis of Morès was an upgrading of the ancient title, Count of Morès.

In 1652, the Marquessate of Montemaggiore ("Monte Mayor") in the Kingdom of Sardinia was created for Pedro Ravaneda. (Note: Origen explains that 1652 is the date of the diploma, which does not state (as it had been the case for other titles) that the ancientcy is the actual date of concession (i.e. 1635). Floris refers to 1635 and D. Scano to 1636.) The Marquis of Montemaggiore was an upgrading of the ancient title, Lord of Thiesi.

=== Dukedoms ===
In a span of approximately three decades, Don Antonio Manca, later the 5th Marquis of Morès, consolidated the various feudal possessions and relatively large inheritances from his extended family. In 1759, he inherited the fiefs of the Manca branch of the Barons of Usini (later Counts of San Giorgio) and, in 1774, he purchased Sarroch "Vigna di Orri". In 1775, he was given the fief of the island of Asinara and the title Duke of Asinara, after which the Marquis of Morès title could be used by the Duke's first son and heir apparent. (Note: Since the dukedom has peculiar succession rules, who actually holds the title is an unsolved question.) In 1817, the Dukedom of Vallombrosa was conferred on his grandson, Vincenzo.

The 1st Duke of Vallombrosa, was first gentleman of the Court of King Victor Emmanuel I of Sardinia. When an anti-feudal revolt took place against the Duke of Asinara, who had refused to conform to the regulations of the Viceroy of Sardinia, Charles Felix (later King of Sardinia) decided to punish both the duke, who was stripped of his property, as well as the revolutionaries, leading the Duke and his family to relocate permanently to Paris. (Note: The Stamenti, the parliament of the kingdom, voted to pay a tax of 400,000 lire, Charles Felix as Viceroy of Sardinia (later King of Sardinia) exerted significant pressure to have the poorest classes exempted from the tax and he judged disputes in feudal jurisdiction in favour of vassals rather than feudal lords.) At the redemption of the fiefs, and elimination of feudalism, by the Crown (King Charles Albert) between 1838 and 1840, the Marquessates of Morès and Montemaggiore were both held by Vincenzo Manca. (Note: Titles were granted either according to the Italian or the Catalan tradition (Latin respectively iuxta morem Italiae and iuxta morem Cathaluniae), meaning that the succession was only by male primogeniture or also by females if the holder of the title had no sons. Succession by females was abolished in 1926, meaning that if the holder has no sons, the title passes to his younger brother, if any (as the normal succession for British titles today).)

== Dukes of Vallombrosa and Asinara ==
- Giacomo Manca Ledà, 1st Marquis of Morès (d. 1667) m. Caterina Ledà Virde, Countess of Bonorva
- Antonio Manca Gaya, 2nd Marquis of Morès (d. 1728) m. Giuseppa Carnicer
- Giacomo Manca Carnicer, 3rd Marquis of Morès (b. 1672) m. Stefania Pilo Manca
- Stefano Manca Pilo, 4th Marquis of Morès (1699–1764) m. Anna Maria Amat Tola
- Antonio Manca-Amat, 1st Duke of Asinara (1729–1805) m. Giovanna Amat
- Giacomo Manca-Amat, 2nd Duke of Asinara (born 1754) m. Rosina "Rosa" Amat Malliano (Note: Rosa Amat Malliano was a daughter of the Baron of Sorso.)
  - Anna Maria Manca-Amat (b. 1779) m. Stefano Manca, Marquis of Villahermosa e Santa Croce (b. 1767).
- Vincenzo "Vincent" Maria Giuseppe Manca-Amat, 1st Duke of Vallombrosa and 3rd Duke of Asinara (1785–1850) m. 1831 Claire Galard de Béarn (Note: Claire Galard de Béarn (1809–1840), was a daughter of Alexandre Louis René Toussaint de Galard de Béarn and Catherine Victoire Chapelle de Jumilhac.)
- Riccardo "Richard" Giovanni Maria Stefano Manca-Amat, 2nd Duke of Vallombrosa and 4th Duke of Asinara (1834–1903) m. 1857 Geneviève de Pérusse des Cars (Note: Geneviève de Pérusse des Cars (1836–1886) was a daughter of Amédée François Régis, 2nd Duke of Cars, and Augustine Joséphine Frédérique du Bouchet de Sourches.)
  - Antoine Amédée-Marie-Vincent Manca-Amat, Marquis de Morès (1858–1896) m. 1882 Medora von Hoffman (Note: Medora de Vallombrosa, Marquise de Morès (1856–1921), an American heiress, was the granddaughter of John Randolph Grymes, the former U.S. Attorney for Western District of Louisiana under President James Madison. Her aunt, and namesake, Medora, was the second wife of banker and lobbyist Samuel Ward.)
  - Louise Claire Isabelle Manca de Vallombrosa, Countess Lafond (1868–1918) m. 1888 Christian Charles Louis, Count Lafond (1853–1934)
  - Amédée Joseph Gabriel Marie Manca-Amat, Comte de Vallombrosa (1879–1968) m. 1906 Adrienne Lannes de Montebello (Note: Adrienne Lannes de Montebello was the daughter of Jean Alban Lannes, 2nd Baron de Montebello and a granddaughter of Gustave Olivier Lannes, Baron de Montebello (the fourth and youngest son of Napoleon's Marshal Jean Lannes, Duke of Montebello, Prince of Siewierz).)
- Louis Richard Manca-Amat, 3rd Duke of Vallombrosa and 5th Duke of Asinara (1885–1959) m. 1917 Marie-Thérèse du Bourg de Bozas
- Antoine "Tony" Manca-Amat, 4th Duke of Vallombrosa and 6th Duke of Asinara (1919–1982)

== Ducal residences ==
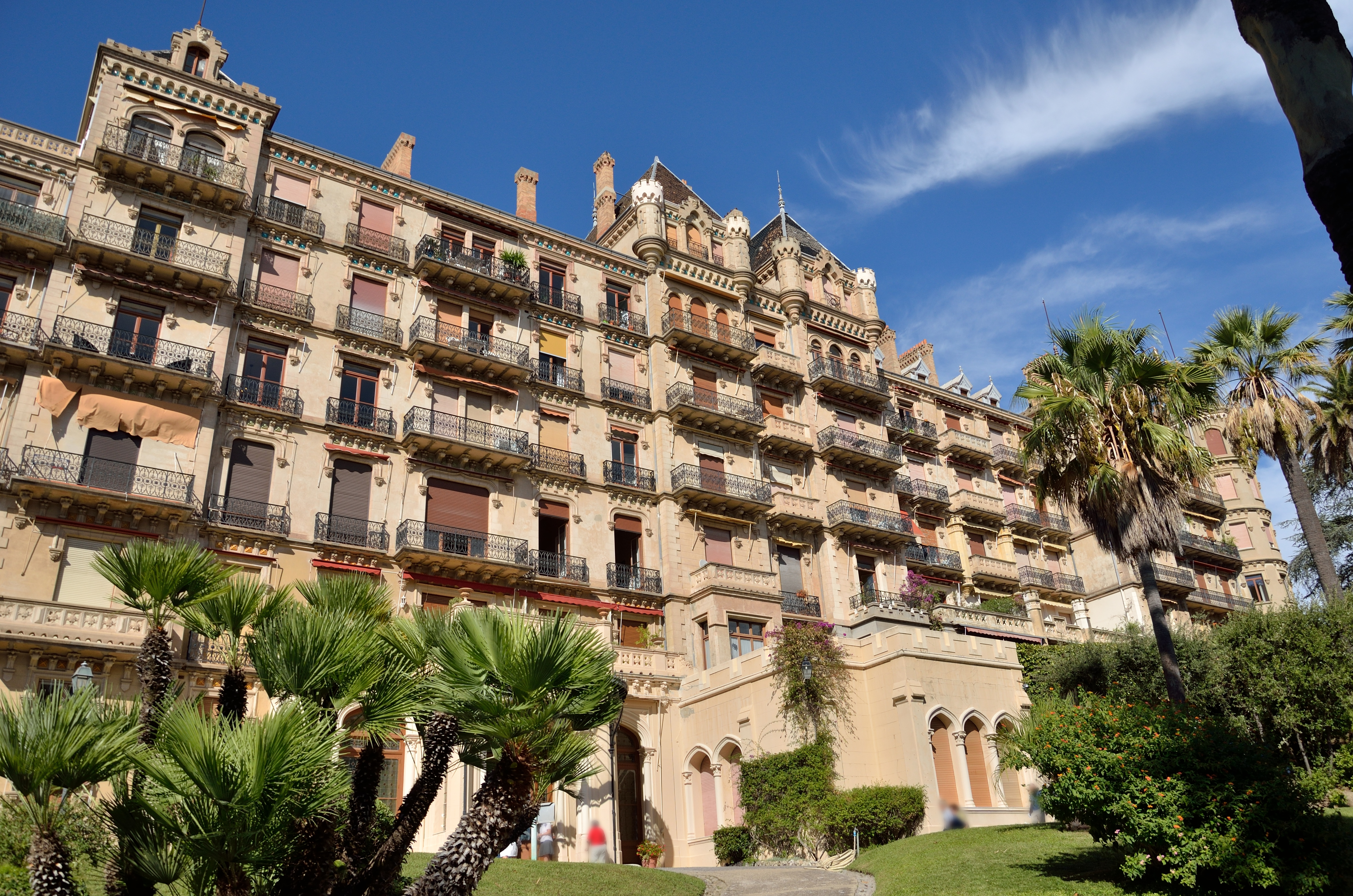
Château Vallombrosa in Cannes

On 25 April 1861, the 4th Duke purchased the Château des Tours, also known as the Villa Sainte-Ursule, in Cannes for 180,000 francs from the Marquess Conyngham. The Gothic Revival villa, later known as the Château Vallombrosa, was built by Sir Thomas Robinson Woolfield on behalf of Lord Londesborough between 1852 and 1856. The Duke added a chapel, decorated the hall, and enlarged the park. After the Duchesses death on 17 October 1887 at the Château d'Abondant in Eure-et-Loir, the Duke retired to Paris, never to return to Cannes. Château Vallombrosa was leased for a while to Prince of Wagram and his wife, Berthe von Rothschild. On 6 May 1890, in order to pay the debts accumulated by his adventurer son, Antoine, Marquis of Morès, the Château was sold to the wealthy German hotelier Henri-Martin Ellmer for 410,000 francs and another 30,000 francs for the furniture. Ellmer hired Laurent Vianay to expand and transform the villa into the Hôtel du Parc, which opened in 1893.

In 1893, the family had estates in Paris, in Eure-et-Loir (the Château d'Abondant), and in Sassari, Sardinia (the Ducal Palace, built between 1775 and 1806 as the family seat of the Dukes of Asinara). In 1899, the 4th Duke also sold the Ducal Palace to the Municipality of Sassari, which uses the palace as its Town Hall.

== See also ==
- List of Marquesses in Italy
- List of dukes in the nobility of Italy
