= Château Vallombrosa =

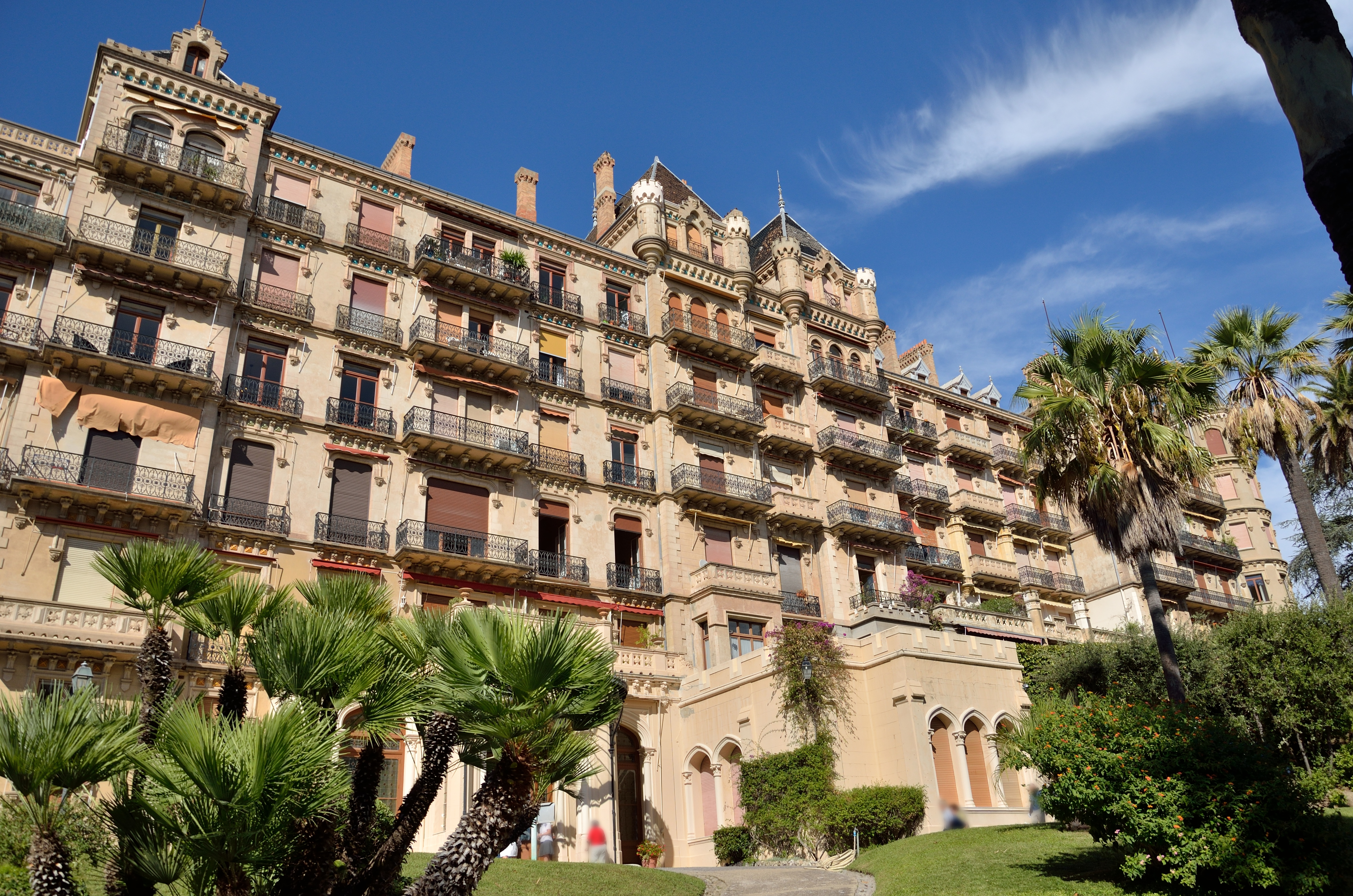
- The Château Vallombrosa in 2016
- Interactive map of the Château Vallombrosa area

General information
- Type: Residential building
- Location: 6, 8 avenue Jean-de-Noailles, Cannes, France
- Construction started: 1852
- Completed: 1856

The Château Vallombrosa, also known as the Hôtel du Parc, is a historic residential building in Cannes.

== History ==
It was built as a hotel for Sir Thomas-Robinson Woolfield from 1852 to 1856 on behalf of Lord Londesborough. Lord Londesborough later sold it to his relative, Marquess Conyngham. It was purchased by Marquis de Morès (later Duke de Vallombrosa) in 1860, who added a chapel and a landscaped garden. In 1893, it was purchased by German hotelier Martin Ellmer, and it became known as the Hotel du Parc until 1934. It was subsequently turned into a residential building with individualised apartments. It has been listed as a Monument historique since 1993.
