= Marquis of Soleminis =

Noble title granted in 1651 by Philip IV, king of Spain and king of Sardinia

Marquess of Soleminis is a title granted in 1651 by Philip IV, king of Spain and king of Sardinia, to the Sardinian nobleman Francisco Angel Vico Sonza (or Vico Zonza). It has passed afterwards to the house Amat.

== The grant ==
The eldest son of Don Sebastian Zonza and Doña Isabel Vico, Francisco Vico Zonza, was allowed to use the maternal surname in order not to let her family extinguish and to inherit the fief of Soleminis from the maternal grandfather Don Francisco Vico Artea; upon that fief, he was created the first Marquis of Soleminis. The fief had been granted to Don Francisco Vico Artea (who had been using the maternal surname first himself) in 1637 as a partial payment of his salaries as a regente (member) in the Council of Aragon, the first Sardinian ever appointed to the post. The village of Soleminis was created by them.

== The inheritance ==
The fief passed over from father to son for three generations, until it passed over to Esperanza, the last Marquis's only surviving child, according to the Spanish and Sardinian succession rules at that time which allowed female succession in case of lack of sons. Esperanza married secondly Don Joseph Amat, Baron of Sorso, issue of an ancient and distinguished Sardinian house of Catalan origin, and the title then passed to her issue. Amat firstborn (the eldest male) has brought the title of Marquess of Soleminis since, among their other titles, and they were recognized as such in Italian official registers until the Italian Republic ceased to recognize nobility titles.

== List of Marquesses of Soleminis ==
Sources:

- Francisco Angel Vico Sonza, 1st Marquess of Soleminis (born around 1615), 1651-1663; m. Doña Lucrezia Masones;
- Francisco Joseph, 2nd Marquess of Soleminis (b. 1653), son of the latter, 1663-1717; m. 1st Doña Teresa Sanjust Manca of the Counts of San Lorenzo and 2nd Maria Caterina (Spiga) Torrellas Ponti Baroness of Capoterra suo jure, dowager Baroness of Las Plassas;
- Domingo, 3rd Marquess of Soleminis (b. 1686), son of the latter by 1st marriage, 1717-1748; m. Doña Esperanza Amat Petreto of the Barons of Sorso;
- Pedro, 4th Marquess of Soleminis (b. 1712), son of the latter, 1748-1792; m. Doña Eusebia Zapata Sanjust of the Barons of Las Plassas;
- Esperanza (Speranza), 5th Marchioness of Soleminis suo jure, daughter of the latter, 1792-1812; m. 1st Don Gabriel Nin Masones of the Counts of the Castillo and 2nd Joseph Amat Baron of Sorso;
- Vincenzo (Vincenzo Anastasio) Amat Amat, 6th Marquess of Soleminis, Baron of Sorso, Marquess of Saint Philip, Marquess of Albis, etc. (b. 1790), grandson of the latter by 2nd marriage and daughter Eusebia, 1812-1869; m. Donna Emanuela Amat Manca of the Marquesses of Villarios; during his rule fiefs were evicted, so was Soleminis;
- Giovanni Amat Amat, 7th Marquess of Soleminis, etc. (b. 1823), son of the latter, 1869-1879; m. Donna Matilde Quesada Amat of the Marquesses of Saint Sebastian;
- Vincenzo Amat Quesada, 8th Marquess of Soleminis, etc. (b. 1852), son of the latter, 1879-1912; m. 1st Donna Caterina Sanjust Amat of the Barons of Teulada and 2nd Donna Ottavia Sanjust Amat of the Barons of Teulada;
- Luigi Amat Sanjust, 9th Marquess of Soleminis, etc. (b. 1890), son of the latter by 1st marriage, 1912-1966; m. Donna Paola Amat Cartolari of the Marquesses of Saint Philip;
- Vincenzo Amat Amat, 10th Marquess of Soleminis, etc. (b. 1921), son of the latter, 1966-1987; m. Maria Gabriella Corridori.

Present holder is a nephew of the latter, also called Vincenzo, with his younger brother as heir presumptive.

== Sources ==
- Francesco Floris, Feudi e feudatari in Sardegna (in Italian; meaning Fiefs and feudal lords in Sardinia), Cagliari, Della Torre, 1996, pp. 000–000. ISBN 8873432883.
- Origen del Cavallerato y de la Nobleza de varias Familias del Reyno de Cerdeña manuscript Amat 1775-1790 (in Spanish; meaning Origin of the knighthood and nobility of various families from the kingdom of Sardinia), Associazione nobiliare araldica genealogica regionale della Sardegna, Cagliari, Libreria Cocco, 1977, article Vico.
- Francesco Floris and Sergio Serra, Storia della nobiltà in Sardegna. Genealogia e araldica delle famiglie nobili sarde (in Italian; meaning History of nobility in Sardinia. Genealogy and heraldry of Sardinian noble families), Cagliari, Della Torre, 1986, articles Vico and Zonza. ISBN 978-88-7343-418-4.

== See also ==
List of Marquesses in Italy
