= Vicente Bacallar =

Sardinian noble

The Most Excellent Vicente Bacallar
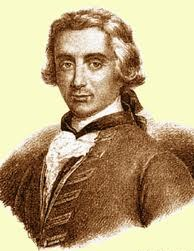
- Born: Vicente Bacallar y Sanna; 6 February 1669; Cagliari
- Died: 11 June 1726 (aged 57); The Hague

Seat N of the Real Academia Española
- In office 19 July 1713 – 11 June 1726
- Preceded by: Seat established
- Succeeded by: Francisco Antonio Zapata

Vicente Bacallar y Sanna, 1st Marquess of San Felipe, later italianized into Vincenzo Bacallar Sanna (Cagliari – Sardinia, island now belonging to Italy, 6 February 1669 – The Hague (Netherlands), 11 June 1726), was a Sardinian nobleman, military officer, linguist, historian, politician and ambassador of the Spanish Empire. He was born to a noble Sardinian family when the kingdom of Sardinia was part of the Spanish crown.

== Biography ==
He belonged to a noble Sardinian family originating from Valencia. When he was young, he probably fled to Spain, where he got an attentive military and policy education. He was appointed by Charles II of Spain governor of the Cape of Cagliari and Gallura and military governor of Sardinia. During the War of the Spanish Succession, when Sardinian aristocracy divided between Philip of Anjou (of the house of Bourbon) and Charles of Habsburg, Bacallar was loyal to the heir designated by Charles II, Philip of Anjou, who became king as Philip V. Due to his loyalty, the king awarded him as Marquess of San Felipe (Marqués de San Felipe, in Spanish; not a feudal title, but given in homage to the king's patron saint) and Viscount of Fuentehermosa (Fuente Hermosa de Miranda, fief in the kingdom of Navarre) in 1709.

When the kingdom of Sardinia surrendered to Archduke Charles, he had to fly to Spain, without giving up the hope to re-conquer Sardinia. The treaty of Utrecht (1714), where he had been part of the Spanish delegation, decided for Sardinia to be part of the Austrian crown. Aftermath he was appointed as an envoy plenipotentiary at the republic of Genoa, from where he supported the attempt by cardinal Alberoni to re-conquer Sardinia to the Spanish crown. The island was actually conquered in 1717, but had to be left in 1720 (War of the Quadruple Alliance) and was acquired by the Dukes of Savoy.

Meanwhile, Vicente Bacallar dedicated to a strong intellectual activity: in 1713 he founded – with other intellectuals – the Real Academia Española, where he hold the seat N and cooperated to its first dictionary, that would be published in 1726. He wrote the short poem Las Tobias (The Tobies, 1709), the poem El Palacio de Momo (Momo's Palace, 1714), the treaty Monarchia Hebrea (The Hebrew Monarchy, 1719) and historical works, such as Description geographique, historique et politique du royaume de Sardaigne (Geographical, historical and political description of the Kingdom of Sardinia).

About the war of the Spanish succession he wrote Commentarios de la guerra de España y historia de su Rey Phelipe V el Animoso desde el principio de su regnado hasta la paz general del año 1725 (Commentaries of the war of Spain and history of its king Philip V the Brave since the beginning of his kingdom to the general peace of the year 1725, 1726). In this work, asked by his monarch, the Marquis intended to inform about the facts happened in and outside Spain during the war objectively. His objectiveness is proved by the respect used with regard to both parties. Doubtless, the work was not appreciated by the power and the first edition – published in Genoa – was retired from the market.

In 1724 he was appointed as ambassador in the Netherlands, with the aim of convincing them to remain neutral, where he died two years after due to a stroke. He left a library of sixteen thousand volumes.

== Bibliography ==
- Bogliolo, Enrico (1987). Tradizione e innovazione nel pensiero politico di Vincenzo Bacallar (in Italian). Turin.
- Giuseppe Manno, Storia di Sardegna, Alliana e Paravia, Turin, 1825–1827, vol. III, pp. 497–501 (in Italian)
- Pasquale Tola, Dizionario biografico degli uomini illustri di Sardegna, Chirio e Mina, Turin, 1837–38, vol. I, pp. 109–114 (in Italian)
- Eduardo Toda y Güell, Bibliografía española de Cerdeña, Huérfanos, Madrid, 1890, pp. 204–205, nn. 585-587 (in Spanish)
- Carlos Seco Serrano, El reinado de Felipe V en los Comentarios del marqués de San Felipe (estudio preliminar), Atlas, Madrid, 1957, pp. V–LXXIX (in Spanish)
- Joaquín Arce, España en Cerdeña : aportación cultural y testimonios de su influjo, Consejo superior de investigaciones científicas, Instituto Jeronimo Zurita, Madrid, 1960, p. 305 (in Spanish)
- Marisa Cocco–Angioy, Vicente Bacallar: la poesía del diplomático sardo-ispanico del secolo XVIII, Pisano, Cagliari, 1983 (in Italian)
- Alessandra Pasolini, Un coleccionista sardo en la Europa del siglo XVIII: el marqués Vicente Bacallar Sanna, plenipotenciario y embajador de Felipe V en Holanda, Artegraf, Madrid, 2008 (extracto de "Boletin de la real academia de la historia", tomo 205, cuaderno 2, pp. 251–282) (in Spanish)
- Sabine Enders, "Il regno di Sardegna, il duca di Baviera e Vincenzo Bacallar Sanna. Storia di un libro" (in Italian), in Vincenzo Bacallar Sanna (Sabine Enders editor), La Sardegna paraninfa della pace e un piano segreto per la sovranità 1712-1714, Stuttgart, Masala, 2011, pp. 11–73
- Onnis, Omar; Mureddu, Manuelle (2019). Illustres. Vita, morte e miracoli di quaranta personalità sarde (in Italian). Sestu: Domus de Janas. ISBN 978-88-97084-90-7. OCLC 1124656644.

== Note ==
This article is mainly the translation of the one in the Spanish version.
