= Consulta Araldica =

The Consulta Araldica (English: Heraldic Consult) was a college instituted by royal decree on 10 October 1869 to advise the Italian government on noble titles, coats of arms and related matters. It was a department of the Ministry of the Interior, combining the roles of the various heraldic colleges which had existed in pre-unification Italy, including the Tribunale Araldico of Lombardy, the Commissione Araldica of Venice and the Congregazione Araldica Capitolina of Rome.

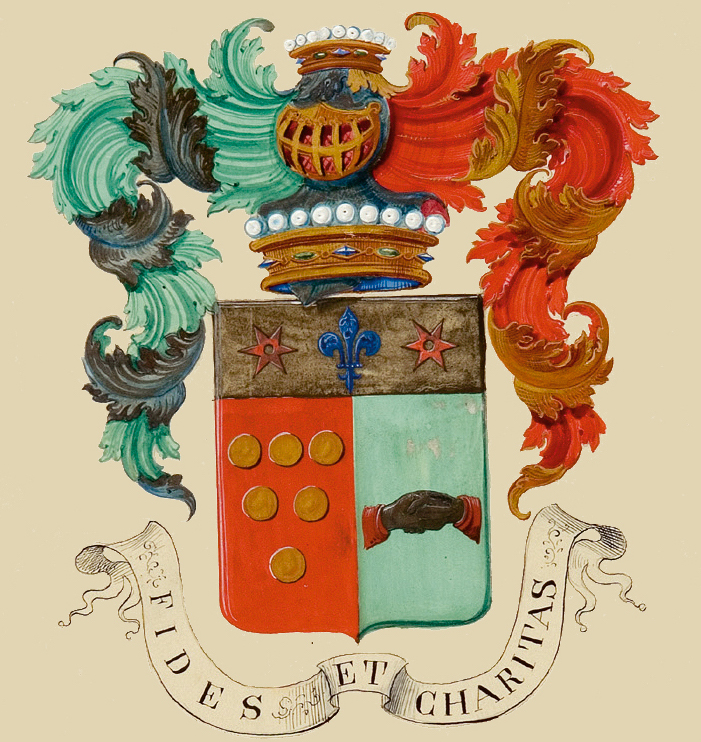
Arms of the Camondo family, granted in 1868 by the Consulta Araldica.

The Consulta Araldica was dissolved following the adoption of the Constitution of the Italian Republic in 1948 and the abolition of state recognition and regulation of noble titles. Although today no government official or office can grant titles of nobility, some of the Consulta Araldica's functions are still performed by the Heraldic Office within the Office of the Prime Minister.

Despite its name, the Consulta Araldica rarely dealt with armorial heraldry. However, an official Blasonario, or armorial, was in an early draft stage when the monarchy was abolished in 1946. Plans had called for this to include the blazons of Italian families whether titled or not.

For Italian titles please refer to the Consulta Araldica's official directories approved by the Council of Ministers and by Royal Decree – Libro d'Oro della Nobiltà Italiana. The Corpo della Nobiltà Italiana is a private association. Other nobility associations exist as well.
