= Marquis of Montemuros =

Marquis of Montemuros, also called Monte Muros, is a title granted in 1762 by Charles Emmanuel III of Savoy, king of Sardinia, to Sardinian nobleman and lord Pedro Martinez (in Italian: Pietro Martinez). It got extinguished in 1918.

== The grant ==
The title was an upgrade of the barony of Muros, Sardinia, former part of the lordship of Ossi bought in 1657 from the Lord of Ossi and Muros Joan Guiò by Francisco Martinez (died 1663), the grantee's great-grandfather's brother.

== The inheritance ==
The title passed over to the grantee's descent up to 1918, when the last Marquis died without issue and in poverty.

== List of Marquesses of Montemuros ==
sources:

1. Pedro Martinez Farina, 1st Marquess of Montemuros (born 1712), 1762-1770; married Maria Angela Palici of the Marquesses of the Planargia;
2. Antonio Ignacio Martinez Palici, 2nd Marquess of Montemuros (born 1751), son of the latter, 1770–1837; m. Luisa Ledà of the Counts of Ittiri;
3. Pietro Martinez Quesada, 3rd Marquess of Montemuros (born 1781), nephew of the latter by the brother Juan Bautista, 1837-1846; m. 1st Vittoria Solaro and 2nd Lucia Carrucciu; under his rule, the fief was "redeemed";
4. Ignazio Martinez Solaro, 4th Marquess of Montemuros (born 1813), son of the latter by 1st marriage, 1846-1857; unmarried;
5. Giuseppe Martinez Solaro, 5th Marquess of Montemuros (born 1815), brother of the latter, 1857-1859; m. Maria Giuseppina Berlinguer;
6. Giovanni Battista Martinez Solaro, 6th Marquess of Montemuros (born 1816), brother of the latter, 1859-1890; married 1st Caterina Satta and 2nd Raffaella Cugia of the Marquesses of Saint Ursula;
7. Pietro Martinez Cugia, 7th Marquess of Montemuros (born 1856), son of the latter by 2nd marriage, 1890-1918; married Rosa Volpi Arcamone but had no issue.

== See also ==
- Marquesses in Sardinia

== Bibliography ==
- Origen del Cavallerato y de la Nobleza de varias Familias del Reyno de Cerdeña manuscript Amat 1775–1790 (in Spanish; meaning Origin of the knighthood and nobility of various families from the kingdom of Sardinia), introduction by Vincenzo Amat, Associazione nobiliare araldica genealogica regionale della Sardegna, Cagliari, Libreria Cocco, 1977, ad vocem
- Dionigi Scano, "Appendix 2. La nobiltà sarda" [The Sardinian Nobility]. Donna Francesca di Zatrillas (in Italian) (new edition of "Donna Francesca di Zatrillas, marchesa di Laconi e di Siete Fuentes", in Archivio storico sardo, 1942 ed.). Sassari: La biblioteca della Nuova Sardegna, 2003. ISBN 84-9789-069-8
- Francesco Floris, Feudi e feudatari in Sardegna (in Italian; meaning Fiefs and feudal lords in Sardinia), Cagliari, Della Torre, 1996, pp. 594–597. ISBN 8873432883.
