= Marquis of Villahermosa e Santa Croce =

Marquis of Villahermosa e Santa Croce is a title first granted in 1745 by Charles Emmanuel III of Sardinia to the Sardinian merchant Bernardino Antonio Genovès. It has passed afterwards to a branch of the house Manca, called Manca di Villahermosa since.

== The grant ==
Don Bernardino Antonio Genovès belonged to a merchant family that was rapidly growing in the nobility thanks to the strong support to the crown, especially financial and political. His father Antonio Francisco had become Marquis of the Guard in 1699 and himself got the prominent title of Duke of San Pietro in 1737, thus becoming the most relevant Sardinian subject. In 1745 he proposed to populate the mountains (saltos) of Pompongia, Curcuris, Fenugheda, Isola Maggiore e Fossadus by Oristano in exchange with the title of Marquis of Villahermosa e Santa Croce, being Villahermosa the name of the village to build and populate and Santa Croce (Saint Cross) the church to dedicate.

Therefore, it consisted in an unpopulated fief.

== The renewal ==
The Duke never succeeded to populate the fief and the village and the church were never built. Upon his death, the treasury took the fief over for debts, but his son managed to obtain a new grant to a nephew, Stefano Manca di Thiesi, a Marquis of Morès's cadet grandson and a cousin of the Duke of Asinara. Technically, the act of grace by which the king makes an extinct title live again is called a renewal.

The title has been inherited by male line since and Stefano Manca and his descent have taken the family name Manca di Villahermosa.

== List of Marquesses ==
=== First grant ===
1. Bernardino Antonio Genovès, 1st Marquess of Villahermosa e Santa Croce (born 1693), 1745-1764

=== Renewal ===
1. Stefano Manca, 2nd Marquess of Villahermosa e Santa Croce (b. 1767), 1804-1838
2. Carlo Manca, 3rd Marquess of Villahermosa e Santa Croce (b. 1806), son of the latter, 1838-1864
3. Giovanni Manca, 4th Marquess of Villahermosa e Santa Croce, 1st Marquis of Nissa (b. 1808), brother of the latter, 1864-1878
4. Stefano Manca, 5th Marquess of Villahermosa e Santa Croce, etc. (b. 1836), son of the latter, 1878-1911
5. Giovanni Manca, 6th Marquess of Villahermosa e Santa Croce, etc. (b. 1862), son of the latter, 1911-1918
6. Stefano Manca, 7th Marquess of Villahermosa e Santa Croce, etc. (b. 1902), son of the latter, 1918-1946
7. Giovanni Manca, 8th Marquess of Villahermosa e Santa Croce, etc. (b. 1931), son of the latter, 1946-2022

Present holder is the only son of the latter, called Stefano, with the eldest of his first cousins as heir presumptive.

== See also ==
- List of Marquesses in Italy

== Sources ==
- Vacca Odone, Enrico (1898). "Part 16: Elenco dei comuni e luoghi dell'isola di Sardegna, divisi per giudicati, con indicazione della regione e degli antichi feudi e feudatarj cui appartenevano nell'epoca del riscatto feudale, nel 1838" [List of Sardinian localities divided per Giudicatos with fiefs and feudal lords to whom they belonged at the time of redemption of fiefs]. Itinerario-guida ufficiale dell'isola di Sardegna [Official itinerary and guide of the island of Sardinia] (in Italian). Cagliari: Meloni e Aitelli.
- Scano, Dionigi (2003) [1942]. "Appendix 2. La nobiltà sarda" [The Sardinian Nobility]. Donna Francesca di Zatrillas (in Italian) (new edition of "Donna Francesca di Zatrillas, marchesa di Laconi e di Siete Fuentes", in Archivio storico sardo, 1942 ed.). Sassari: La biblioteca della Nuova Sardegna. ISBN 84-9789-069-8.
- Floris, Francesco (1996). Feudi e feudatari in Sardegna [Fiefs and feudal lords in Sardinia] (in Italian). Vol. 1 and 2. foreword by Bruno Anatra. Cagliari: Della Torre. pp. 469–479. ISBN 88-7343-288-3.
