= Marquess of San Felipe =

Hereditary title in the Peerages of Spain and Sardinia

Marquessate of San Felipe
- Creation date: 12 March 1709
- Created by: Philip V
- Peerage: Peerage of Spain, Peerage of Sardinia
- First holder: Vicente Bacallar y Sanna, 1st Marquess of San Felipe

Marquess of San Felipe (Spanish: Marqués de San Felipe; Italian: Marchese di San Filippo), was a hereditary title in the Peerage of Spain and Peerage of Sardinia, granted in 1709 by Philip V to Vicente Bacallar y Sanna, a Sardinian historian of Valencian origin who served as ambassador in the Spanish Netherlands and the Republic of Genoa

The title became extinct in 1983 and is currently held in pretence by Vincenzo Amat di San Filippo, an Italian from Alghero.^{a}

== The grant ==
Vicente Bacallar y Sanna (as in the Spanish and Sardinian use, with both the father's and the mother's surnames) was a military officer and politician who supported Philip of Anjou, the heir appointed by the last Habsburg king Charles II, in the War of the Spanish Succession. For this reason, he had to flow in exile when the other claimant, Charles of Austria, took control over Sardinia. As an award to Bacallar's loyalty, Philip, now Philip V of Spain, made him Viscount of Fuente Hermosa and Marquess of St. Philip (as a homage to his own patron saint). Bacallar became later an important historian, linguist and political philosopher while still serving as military and diplomat.

== The inheritance ==
Bacallar's only surviving issue was his daughter Maria Josefa, who married Francisco Amat of an ancient and distinguished Sardinian house of Catalan origin, son of the Marquess of Villarios. In accordance with Spanish and Sardinian succession rules at that time, she inherited the titles and has transmitted them to her issue. Amat firstborn (the eldest male) has brought the title of Marquess of St. Philip since (the Viscountcy being laid down, although no formal act of disclaimer has ever been issued), and they were recognized as such in Italian official registers until the Italian Republic ceased to recognize nobility titles. Along with the titles, Amats have inherited the name Vicente, or Vincenzo in Italian.

== List of Marquesses of San Felipe ==
Sources:

- Vicente Bacallar, 1st Marquess of San Felipe (b. 1669), 1709-1726; m. Jeronima Cervellon Manca of the Barons of Samatzai;
- Maria Josefa Bacallar Cervellon, 2nd Marchioness of San Felipe suo jure (b. 1694), daughter of the latter, 1726-1738; m. Francisco Amat Tola of the Marquesses of Villarios;
- Vicente (Vincenzo) Amat Bacallar, 3rd Marquess of San Felipe (b. 1726), son of the latter, 1738-1762; m. Magdalena Manca Masones Marchioness of Albis suo jure;
- Juan (Giovanni) Amat Manca, 4th Marquess of San Felipe (b. 1754), Marquess of Albis, etc., son of the latter, 1762-1818; m. Eusebia Amat Vico, Baroness of Sorso suo jure;
- Vincenzo (Vincenzo Anastasio) Amat Amat, 5th Marquess of San Felipe, Baron of Sorso, Marquess of Soleminis, Marquess of Albis, etc. (b. 1790), son of the latter, 1812-1869; m. Emanuela Amat Manca of the Marquesses of Villarios;
- Giovanni Amat Amat, 6th Marquess of San Felipe, etc. (b. 1823), son of the latter, 1869-1879; m. Matilde Quesada Amat of the Marquesses of San Sebastián;
- Vincenzo Amat Quesada, 7th Marquess of San Felipe, etc. (b. 1852), son of the latter, 1879-1912; m. 1st Caterina Sanjust Amat of the Barons of Teulada and 2nd Ottavia Sanjust Amat of the Barons of Teulada;
- Luigi Amat Sanjust, 8th Marquess of San Felipe, etc. (b. 1890), son of the latter by 1st marriage, 1912-1966; m. Paola Amat Cartolari of the Marquesses of San Felipe;
- Vincenzo Amat Amat, 9th Marquess of San Felipe, etc. (b. 1921), son of the latter, 1966-1987; m. Maria Gabriella Corridori.

Present holder is a nephew of the latter, also called Vincenzo, with his younger brother as heir presumptive.

== Sources ==
- Francesco Floris, Feudi e feudatari in Sardegna (in Italian; meaning Fiefs and feudal lords in Sardinia), Cagliari, Della Torre, 1996, pp. 528–535. ISBN 8873432883.
- Origen del Cavallerato y de la Nobleza de varias Familias del Reyno de Cerdeña manuscript Amat 1775-1790 (in Spanish; meaning Origin of the knighthood and nobility of various families from the kingdom of Sardinia), Associazione nobiliare araldica genealogica regionale della Sardegna, Cagliari, Libreria Cocco, 1977, ad vocem.
- Francesco Floris and Sergio Serra, Storia della nobiltà in Sardegna. Genealogia e araldica delle famiglie nobili sarde (in Italian; meaning History of nobility in Sardinia. Genealogy and heraldry of Sardinian noble families), Cagliari, Della Torre, 1986, ad vocem.

== See also ==
- List of Marquesses in Italy
