= Chateau de Mores =

Historic house in North Dakota, United States

- U.S. National Register of Historic Places
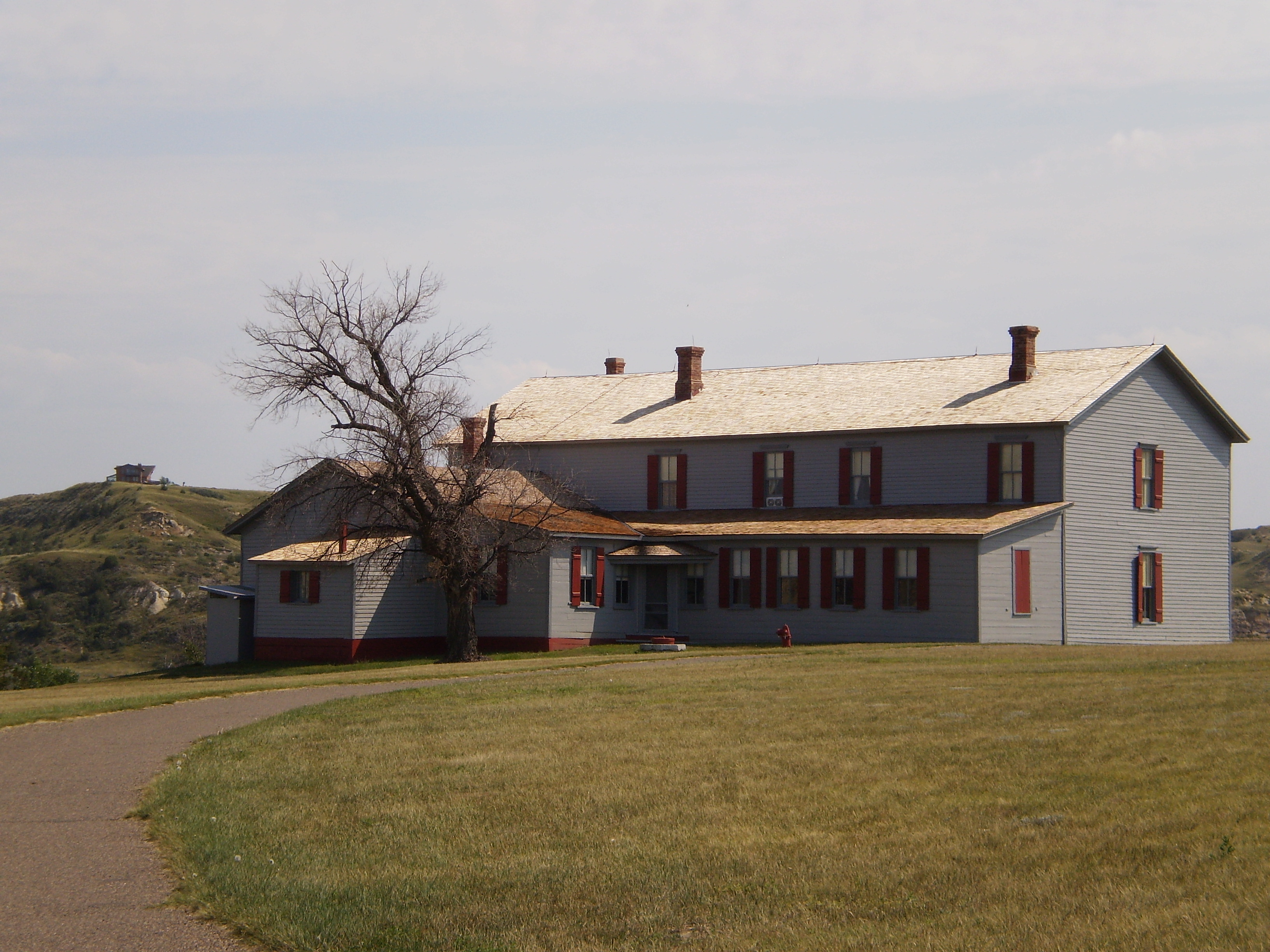
- Chateau de Mores

- Location within North Dakota Location within the United States
- Location: SW of Medora, North Dakota, US on west bank of Little Missouri River
- Nearest city: Medora
- Coordinates: 46°54′40″N 103°31′57″W
- Area: 128.3 acres (51.9 ha)
- Built: 1883
- NRHP reference No.: 75001299
- Added to NRHP: April 16, 1975

The Chateau de Mores in Medora, North Dakota, United States, is a historic home built by the Marquis de Morès in 1883 as a hunting lodge and summer home for his family and guests. The home later became part of the 128-acre (0.52 km^{2}) Chateau de Mores State Historic Site, which also includes Chimney Park and de Mores Memorial Park.

== History ==
The Marquis was a French aristocrat and entrepreneur who came to the Dakota badlands in 1883 to establish a new kind of cattle operation. He planned to slaughter and cold pack his cattle and ship it east in refrigerated rail cars. The slaughterhouse was built in the town which the Marquis founded and named for his wife, Medora Marie Von Hoffman. Medora was named for her aunt, the second wife of Samuel Cutler Ward. She was also the granddaughter of John Randolph Grymes and his wife Suzette Claiborne, who was also the third wife of Gov. William C.C. Claiborne. He built many structures in the town for those he employed in his operations, including St. Mary's Catholic Church. For three years the small town bustled, but in 1886 the operation collapsed due to drought, competition from meat packers back east, and the Marquis' own lack of business experience, and the plant was abandoned. The Marquis and his family returned to Europe, but left behind a small town rife with the flavor and romanticism of the American Old West.

The chateau was occupied seasonally by the family for only three years from 1883 to 1886. During the harsh winter months they would go to France, returning again in spring. After 1886 the Marquis visited the chateau twice, in 1887 and 1889, while Medora and their children visited only once more in 1903 after the Marquis' death, at which time she spent six weeks there.

From this time on the house was maintained by caretakers. They would ready the house for occupation in the spring but the family never returned. The eldest son gave the caretakers permission to operate the chateau as a boarding house in 1921. During this period the house suffered from theft and lack of maintenance.

The home and the land on which it sat was given to the state of North Dakota in 1936 on the condition that it be maintained and opened to the public. It was restored from 1937 to 1941 by the Civilian Conservation Corps and again in 1995.

== Museum ==
The Chateau de Mores is operated as a museum by the State Historical Society of North Dakota. It is open to the public with guided tours available. Its features include reproduced carpets and wallpaper and authentic artifacts, along with period furniture. A permanent exhibit focuses on the Marquis de Mores, who built the house, and changing exhibit galleries include displays of art, culture and history.

== Architecture ==
The chateau itself is a two-story 26-room wood-frame building. The house is not a true chateau but was given the name by locals. While rough by aristocratic standards, it was considerably more luxurious than most contemporary homes built by Dakota settlers, which were mostly constructed of sod or logs.

== See also ==
- Von Hoffman House, also associated with the Marquis de Mores, also in Medora and NRHP-listed
- Badlands
- Theodore Roosevelt National Park
