= Grymes =

Grymes is a surname. Notable people with the surname include:

- Aaron Grymes (born 1991), Canadian football player
- Charles Grymes McCawley (1827–1891), American military service member
- John Randolph Grymes (1786–1854), American politician
- Nahum Thorton Grymes, known as J. Holiday (born 1984), American singer
- Philip Grymes (c. 1777 – 1818), American lawyer
- William Grymes Pettus (1794–1867), American politician
