= St. Mary's Catholic Church (Medora, North Dakota) =

Historic church in North Dakota, United States

- U.S. National Register of Historic Places
- The church in 2026

- Location within North Dakota Location within the United States
- Location: 4th St. and 3rd Ave. Medora, North Dakota
- Coordinates: 46°54′52″N 103°31′20″W
- Area: less than one acre
- Built: 1884
- Built by: Peter Book
- NRHP reference No.: 77001017
- Added to NRHP: December 2, 1977

The St. Mary's Catholic Church in Medora, North Dakota, was built in 1884 by Peter Book, a builder who also constructed the Von Hoffman House. It was listed on the National Register of Historic Places in 1977.

A metal plate on the church states that it was built by the Marquise de Morès. She was the wife of the Marquis de Morès.
