= United States Attorney for the District of Louisiana =

Defunct U.S. federal prosecutor's office

United States Attorney for the District of Louisiana is a defunct United States Attorney's office in Louisiana Territory and then the U.S. state of Louisiana from 1805 to 1823. The U.S. Attorney for Louisiana was the chief law-enforcement officer for the United States District Court for the District of Louisiana. The district was succeeded by the United States Attorney for the Eastern District of Louisiana and the United States Attorney for the Western District of Louisiana.

== Office holders ==
- James Brown (1805–1808)
- Philip Grymes (1808–1810)
- Tully Robinson (1810–1811)
- John R. Grymes (1811–1814)
- Tully Robinson (1814)
- John Dick (1814–1821)
- John W. Smith (1821–1823)
