= De Mores Memorial Park =

- U.S. National Register of Historic Places
- Location within North Dakota Location within the United States
- Location: SE corner of Main St. & 3rd Ave., Medora, North Dakota
- Coordinates: 46°54′49″N 103°31′17″W
- MPS: Federal Relief Construction in North Dakota, 1931-1943
- NRHP reference No.: 100003204
- Added to NRHP: March 4, 2019

The De Mores Memorial Park in Medora, North Dakota was listed on the National Register of Historic Places in 2019.

The park is located in downtown Medora and is about .25 acres (0.10 ha) in size. It includes a 1926 bronze statue of the Marquis de Mores, donated by his sons. A 1938 Works Progress Administration project created a flagstone courtyard.

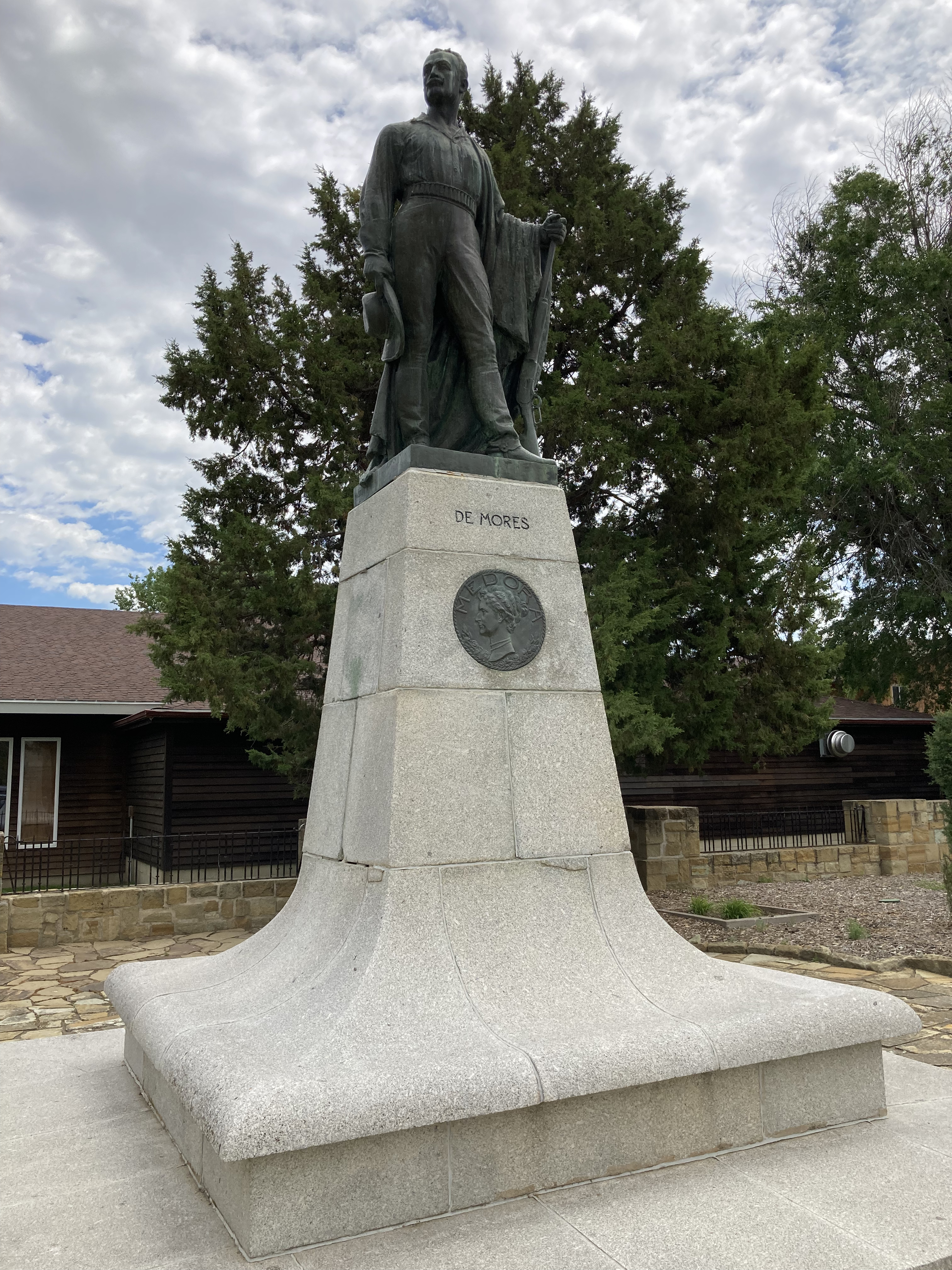
Statue of the Marquis de Mores in Medora

The park's integrity was reported damaged by a hole being cut in its wall.
