= De Mores Packing Plant Ruins =

- U.S. National Register of Historic Places
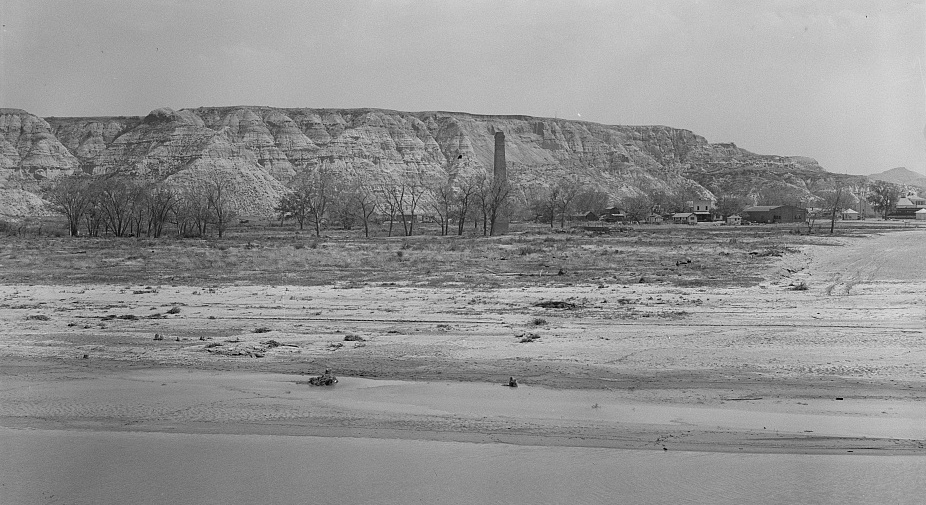

- Location within North Dakota Location within the United States
- Nearest city: Medora, North Dakota
- Coordinates: 46.9162°N 103.5281°W
- Area: 20 acres (8.1 ha)
- Built: 1883
- NRHP reference No.: 75001300
- Added to NRHP: February 18, 1975

The De Mores Packing Plant Ruins near Medora in Billings County, North Dakota, is a historic site listed on the National Register of Historic Places (NRHP). The site is now preserved as Chimney Park, the largest open space within Medora's city limits.

== History ==
The packing plant was built and began operations in 1883. The plant was built by Antoine Amédée Marie Vincent de Vallombrosa, the Marquis de Morès, a pretender to the French throne, determined and resourceful, who arrived at the tiny settlement of Little Missouri, Dakota Territory, in April 1883 for the purpose of establishing a meat packing enterprise utilizing some innovative ideas that he was convinced could revolutionize the meat producing industry." De Mores hoped to create savings by slaughtering and processing cattle close to the range, eliminating the cost of feeding and caring for the live animals during transport to larger cities to the east. De Mores intended to eliminate "the middleman" by "shipping processed beef directly from the range to the consumer."

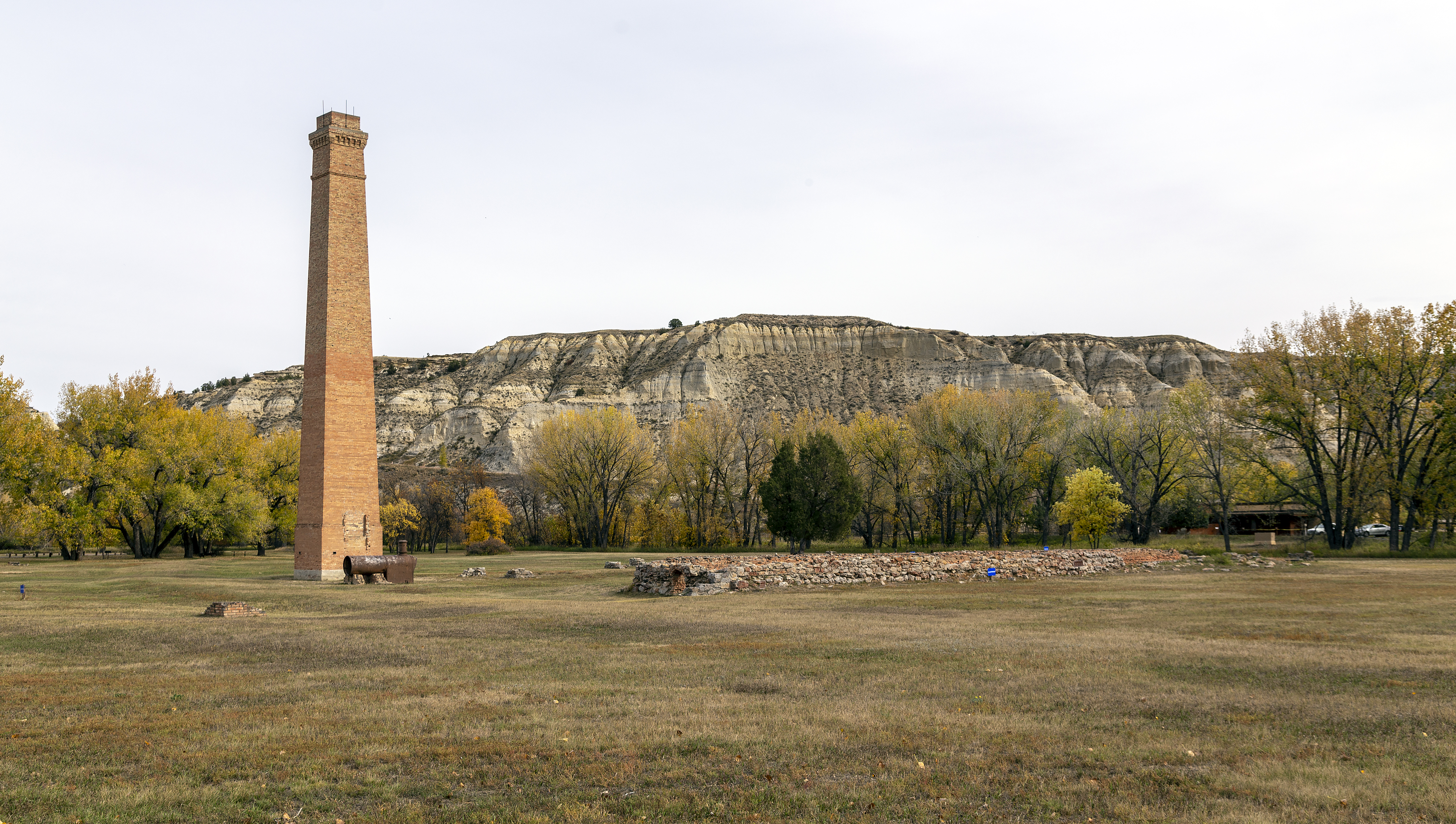
Chimney Park in 2018

De Mores built his operation in Medora, along the east bank of the Little Missouri River, in close proximity to the spot where the Northern Pacific Railway crossed the river. The plant had the capacity to process 150 cows per day. The facilities included a slaughter house, power house, cooper shop, fertilizer room, three ice houses, a cooling and storage building, loading platform, and holding pens.

De Mores' packing venture failed, and the facilities were closed in 1886. Some sources suggest that the severe weather conditions during the winter of 1886-1887 played a part in the demise of the facilities. The building was destroyed by fire on March 17, 1907. The site was acquired by North Dakota's State Historical Society in 1936. As part of a Works Progress Administration (WPA) project, markers were placed at the foundation corners of the structures, and portions of the slaughterhouse foundation and chimney were repaired. Additional repairs were made in 1970.

It is a 20 acres (8.1 ha) area with just one surviving structure and one other site. It was listed on the NRHP in 1975. The slaughterhouse chimney is the most conspicuous landmark remaining at the site.
