= John Witherspoon Smith =

1820s U.S. Attorney in New Orleans

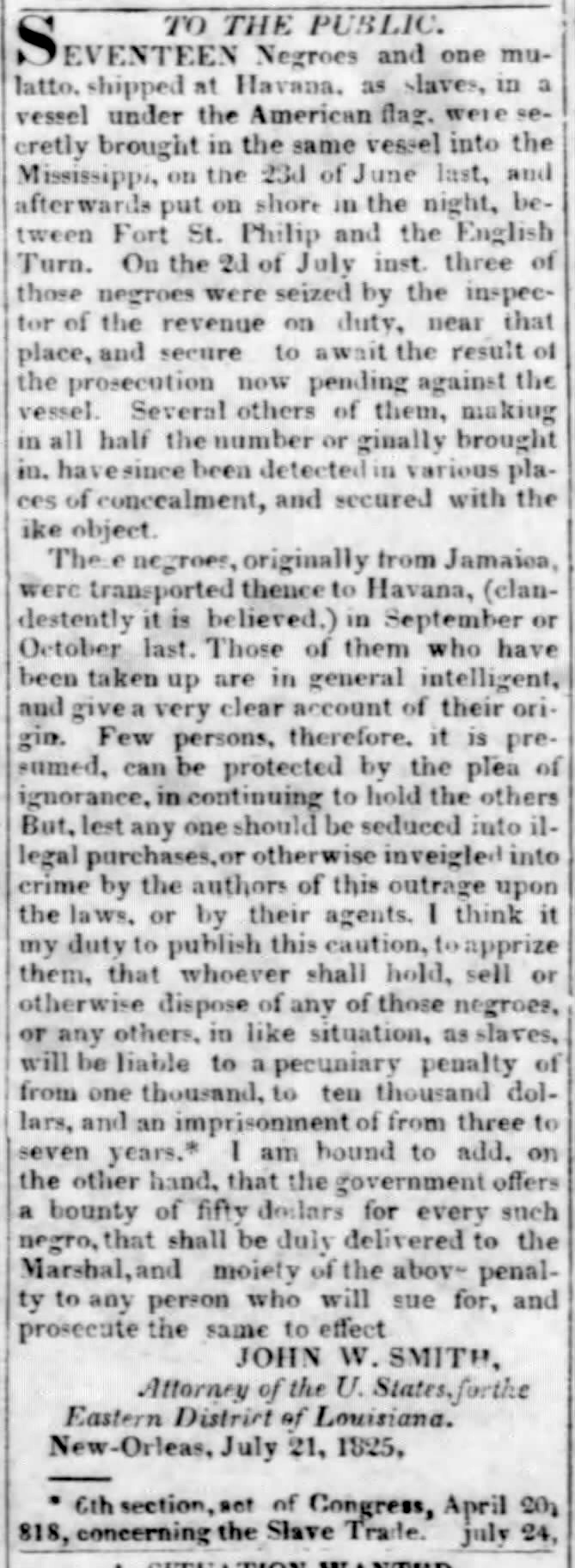
"To the Public. Seventeen Negroes and one mulatto, shipped at Havana, as slaves..." Louisiana State Gazette, December 8, 1825

John Witherspoon Smith (1778 – November 7, 1829) was an American lawyer who served as United States Attorney in New Orleans for most of the 1820s.

== Biography ==
Smith was born in Trenton, New Jersey in 1778, and was a graduate of the College of New Jersey (Princeton University), class of 1795. According to the U.S. National Archives, Smith moved to New Orleans from New York shortly after the completion of the Louisiana Purchase, and "served as clerk of the superior court until Governor Claiborne removed him in 1807." Smith reportedly took part in the Battle of New Orleans in 1815.

As Acting U.S. Attorney, Smith took affidavits in a piracy case in 1819. Smith was initially appointed as United States Attorney for the District of Louisiana in 1821, and served for two years until 1823, at which time the district was divided. His official commission date as the first United States Attorney for the Eastern District of Louisiana, was January 10, 1825; he served until 1829. He is sometimes described as a federal judge, in either Louisiana or Missouri, but this appears to be erroneous. He worked at one time as clerk of Louisiana Supreme Court, which may be the source of the confusion. Circa 1824 he was involved in cases involving slave imports from Florida. In 1827 he was involved in the federal investigation of the illegal importation (from Jamaica by way of Cuba) and subsequent sale of enslaved people to Mississippi River buyers. Smith was a slave owner himself; records show that around 1829 he purchased two people from Isaac Franklin.

On March 10, 1805, he marriedSarah Henrietta Duer, with whom he had 10 children. The family lived at one time on Melpomene street in New Orleans. His father was Samuel Stanhope Smith, a president of Princeton, and his maternal grandfather was John Witherspoon, a president of Princeton and a signer of Declaration of Independence. He was an uncle of John C. Breckinridge. One of his brothers-in-law was Territory of Orleans superior court judge John B. Prevost, a stepson of Aaron Burr.

He died in New Orleans in 1829. His widow, Sarah Duer Smith, outlived him by almost 60 years, dying in 1887, at 101 years of age.
