= John Randolph Grymes =

American politician

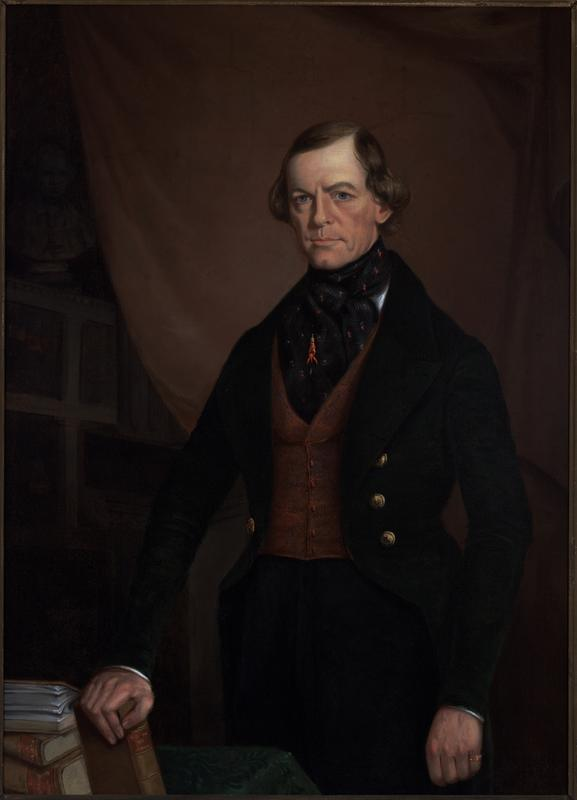
- Portrait of Grymes by Theodore Sidney Moise, c. 1842

U.S. Attorney for Western District of Louisiana
- In office 1811–1814
- Appointed by: James Madison
- Preceded by: Tully Robinson
- Succeeded by: Tully Robinson

Personal details
- Born: December 14, 1786 Orange County, Virginia, US
- Died: December 3, 1854 (aged 67) New Orleans, Louisiana, US
- Spouse: Cayetana Susana Bosque y Fangui (after 1822)
- Relations: Philip Grymes (brother); Christopher Robinson (uncle); Sir John Robinson, Bt (cousin); Medora de Vallombrosa, Marquise de Morès (granddaughter)
- Children: 4
- Education: University of Virginia
- Occupation: Attorney, businessman, legislator

John Randolph Grymes (December 14, 1786 – December 3, 1854) was a New Orleans attorney, member of the Louisiana state legislature, U.S. attorney for Louisiana district, and aide-de-camp to General Andrew Jackson during the Battle of New Orleans.

== Early life ==
Grymes was born on December 14, 1786, in Orange County, Virginia into several of the First Families of Virginia. He was a son of Benjamin Grymes (c. 1750–1805) and Sarah Robinson (1755–1831). (Note: Several sources claim he was not a son of Benjamin Grymes but a son of Benjamin's brother, John Randolph Grymes (1747–1820) and, his wife (and cousin), Susannah Beverley (née Randolph) Grymes (1755–1791), sister of U.S. Secretary of State Edmund Randolph (both children of John Randolph).) Among his siblings were Philip Grymes, Thomas Grymes, Elizabeth Pope (née Grymes) Braxton and Peyton Grymes.

His paternal grandparents were Mary (née Randolph) Grymes and Colonel Philip Ludwell Grymes, a member of the Virginia House of Burgesses. Like Thomas Jefferson and Robert E. Lee, Grymes was a descendant of William Randolph and Mary Isham, through his maternal grandmother's father, Sir John Randolph, the youngest son of William and Mary. His uncle and namesake, John Randolph Grymes, was a loyalist during the American Revolution who joined the British Army under the former Royal Governor of Virginia Lord Dunmore. His maternal grandparents were Sarah (née Lister) Robinson and Peter Robinson, who was educated at Oriel College, Oxford and was a member of the Virginia House Burgesses between 1758 and 1761. His uncle, Christopher Robinson, was a United Empire Loyalist and the father of Sir John Robinson, 1st Baronet, the Chief Justice of Upper Canada. Their ancestor, also named Christopher Robinson, came to Virginia about 1666 as secretary to Sir William Berkeley, Governor of Virginia. His grandfather was a brother of John Robinson, Speaker of the House of Burgesses, and Beverley Robinson, also a loyalist leader.

== Career ==
In 1808, Grymes arrived in New Orleans. On May 4, 1811, Grymes was appointed to replace his deceased brother Philip as the U.S. attorney for Louisiana district, serving until December 1814, when he resigned his post to represent the pirate Jean Lafitte. During the War of 1812, Grymes was part of General Andrew Jackson staff as an aide-de-camp during the Battle of New Orleans. He was a colonel.

As an attorney, he was law partners with Edward Livingston and was one of Jackson's lawyers in the case over the Second Bank of the United States, he opposed Daniel Webster in court against Myra Clark Gaines, and, reportedly, he earned $100,000 in the batture (or alluvial) land case against Edward Livingston.

Grymes was a member of the "New Orleans Association" which included attorneys Edward Livingston and Abner L. Duncan, merchant John K. West, smuggler Pierre Laffite, and pirate Jean Laffite. Grymes was also a founding member of The Boston Club, the third-oldest private gentlemen's club in the United States, and oldest in the Southern USA. In 1820, he was a member of the Electoral College, voting for James Monroe.

== Personal life ==
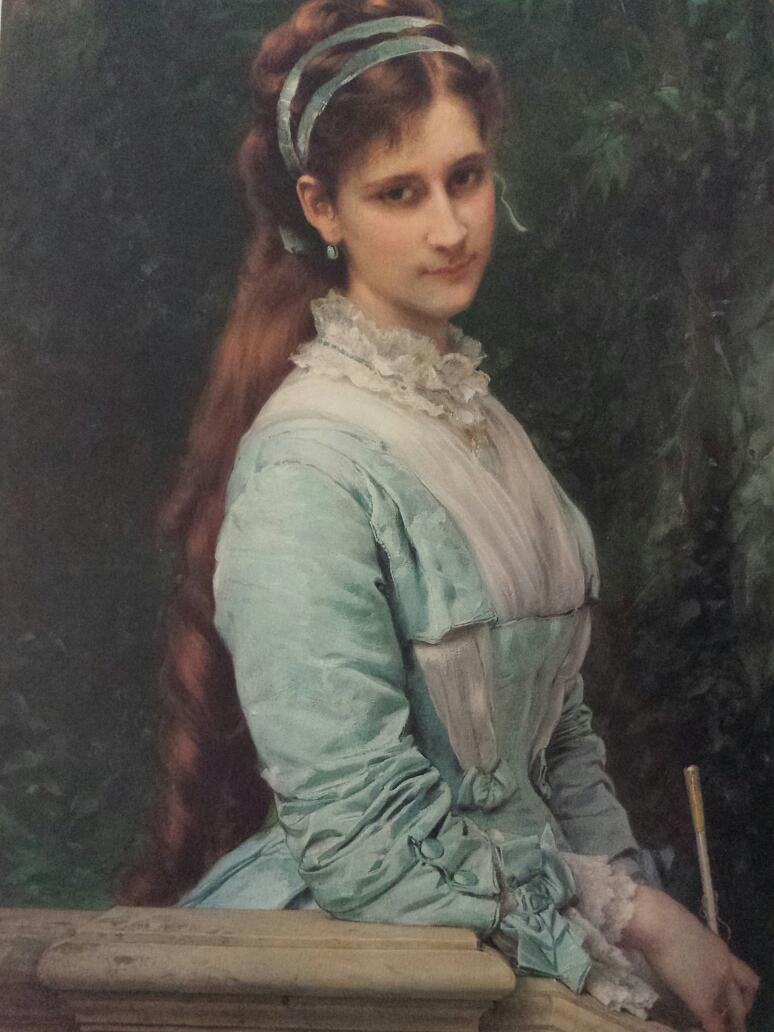
Grymes' granddaughter Medora de Vallombrosa, Marquise de Morès.

On December 1, 1822, Grymes married Cayetana Susana "Suzette" (née Bosque) Claiborne, widow of the first Louisiana Governor William C. C. Claiborne, and daughter of Felicidad Fangui and Bartolomé Bosque, a wealthy Spanish merchant and ship owner. From her first marriage, she was the mother of two: Sophronia Louise Claiborne (the wife of Antoine James de Marigny, the son of Bernard de Marigny) and Charles W. W. Claiborne, the Clerk of the U.S. Court in New Orleans. Together, they lived at 612 Royal Street in the French Quarter of New Orleans, (Note: The Grymes family home in New Orleans, located at 612 Royal Street, was built by Dr. Raymond Devèze around 1811. After Dr. Devèze died in Bordeaux in 1826, the Grymes acquired the residence, which they later sold to Judge Adolphe Pichot.) and were the parents of four children, including:

- Marie Angeline "Medora" Grymes (1824–1867), who married Samuel Ward in 1843. He was widowed from Emily Astor, eldest daughter of William Backhouse Astor Sr. Both of their sons died in the 1860s.
- John Randolph Grymes III (b. 1826)
- Charles Alfred Grymes (1829–1905), a physician who married Emma Stebbins (1837–1865), a daughter of U.S. Representative Henry George Stebbins, in 1858. After her death, he married Mary Helen James (1840–1881), a daughter of John Barber James and Mary Helen (née Vanderburgh) James (a daughter of Federal Vanderburgh), in 1868. Mary, a niece of Henry James Sr., was a cousin of psychologist William James, author Henry James, and diarist Alice James.
- Athenais Grymes (1832–1897), who married New York banker, Louis A. von Hoffman, one of the founders of the Knickerbocker Club.

Grymes died in New Orleans on December 3, 1854. His widow survived him by over a quarter century before her death in Paris August 6, 1881.

=== Descendants ===
Through his son Alfred, he was a grandfather of John Randolph Grymes (1859–1929), who married his half first cousin once removed, Sophronie Coale Thomas, (Note: Sophronie Coale Thomas (1861–1957) was the great-granddaughter of Suzette Grymes (from her first marriage to Governor Claiborne) through her granddaughter Marie Suzette de Marigny de Mandeville (1837–1924), who married Philip Evan Thomas, himself a son of Philip E. Thomas, President of Baltimore and Ohio Railroad, in 1859.) and Mabel Grymes Heneberger (1861–1883), who married Lucien Guy Heneberger, a U.S. Naval Surgeon who served as head of the Naval Hospital at Annapolis. Mabel died after giving birth to their first child, and Heneberger built the Mabel Memorial Chapel and Mabel Memorial Schoolhouse in Harrisonburg, Virginia in her honor.

Through his daughter Athenais, he was a grandfather of Medora von Hoffmann (1856–1921), who married Marquis de Mores, a French-born nobleman who was a frontier ranchman in the Badlands of Dakota Territory; he was assassinated in Algeria in 1896. He was also the grandfather of Pauline Grymes (1858–1950), who married the wealthy German industrialist Baron Ferdinand von Stumm whose family owned the Neunkirchen Iron and Steelworks in St. Petersburg, Russia in 1878.

=== Legacy ===
Grymes Hill, Staten Island, is named after Suzette Grymes, who settled there in 1836 with her children. She built a mansion on the hill there known as "Capo di Monte" ("Top of the Mountain").

== Ancestry ==
Ancestors of John Randolph Grymes

16. John Grymes
8. John Grymes
17. Alice Towneley
4. Philip Grymes
18. Phillip Ludwell
9. Lucy Ludwell
19. Hannah Harrison
2. Benjamin Grymes
20. William Randolph
10. John Randolph
21. Mary Isham
5. Mary Randolph
22. Peter Beverly
11. Susannah Beverly
23. Elizabeth Peyton
1. John Randolph Grymes
24. Christopher Robinson
12. Christopher Robinson
25. Agatha Bertram Obert
6. Peter Robinson
26. Christopher Wormeley
13. Judith Wormley
27. Francis Armistead
3. Sarah Robinson
28. Unknown
14. Alexander Lister
29. Unknown
7. Sarah Lister
30. Edmund Berkeley
15. Lucy Berkeley
31. Lucy Burwell
