= Von Hoffman House =

Historic house in North Dakota, United States

- U.S. National Register of Historic Places
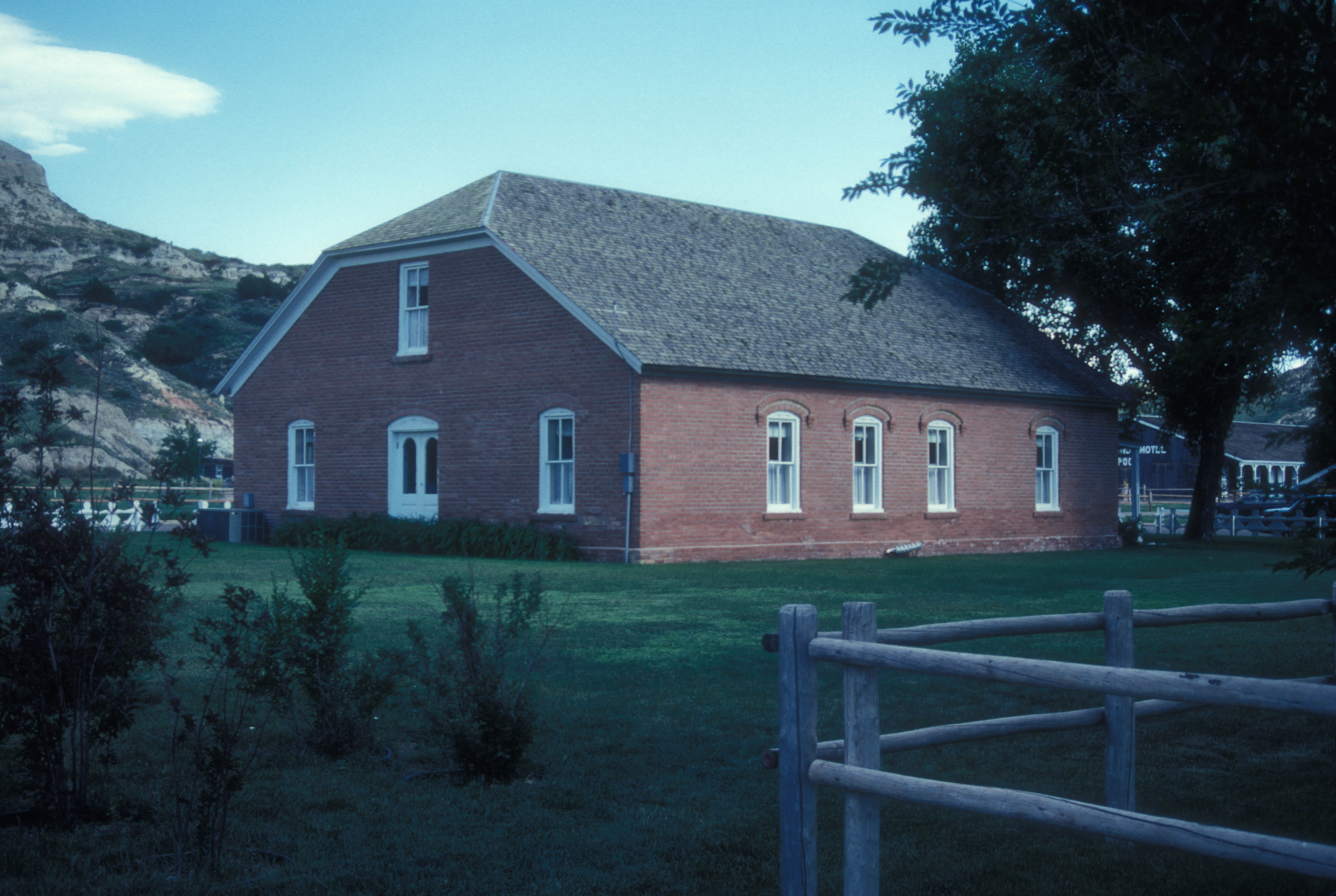

- Location within North Dakota Location within the United States
- Location: Broadway and 5th St., Medora, North Dakota
- Coordinates: 46°54′50″N 103°31′17″W
- Area: less than one acre
- Built: 1884
- Built by: Book, Peter
- NRHP reference No.: 77001018
- Added to NRHP: November 21, 1977

The Von Hoffman House at Broadway and 5th St. in Medora, North Dakota, was built in 1884. It was listed on the National Register of Historic Places in 1977. The listing included one contributing building and one contributing structure.

Known also as the Medora Doll House, it is a common-bond brick house that is the work of Peter Book, who owned and operated a Medora brick factory in the mid-1880s. Peter Book was also a builder of St. Mary's Catholic Church, which is also NRHP-listed.

The home was commissioned by the Marquis de Mores for Louis von Hoffmann and Athenais von Hoffman, the parents of his wife, Medora von Hoffmann.

== See also ==
- De Mores Packing Plant Ruins, also NRHP-listed
