= Medora de Vallombrosa, Marquise de Morès =

American heiress who married Marquis de Morès

Medora de Vallombrosa
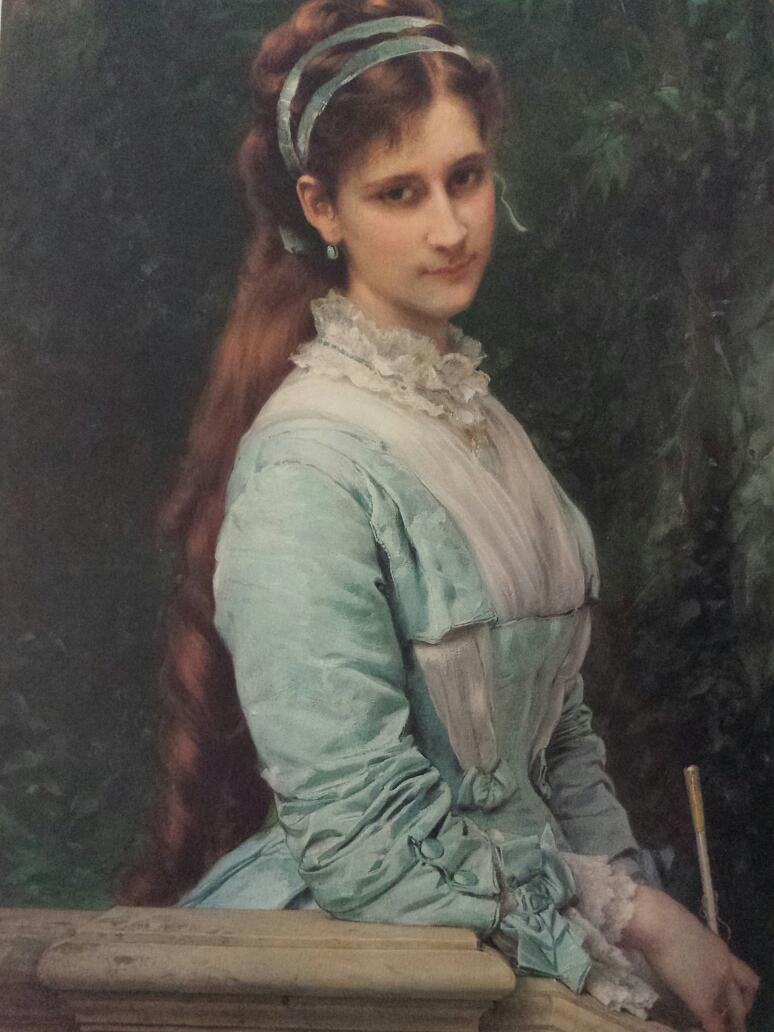
- Medora circa 1876
- Born: August 21, 1856; Staten Island, New York
- Died: March 2, 1921 (aged 64); Cannes, France
- Spouse: Marquis de Morès
- Children: 3

Medora de Vallombrosa, Marquise de Morès (née von Hoffmann) (August 21, 1856 – March 2, 1921), was an American heiress who married Marquis de Morès.

== Early life, family and education ==
Medora was the daughter of Louis A. von Hoffman, a wealthy New York banker who was one of the founders of the Knickerbocker Club, and his wife, Athenais (née Grymes) von Hoffman (1832–1897), whose family had been prominent in Virginia and Louisiana. Her younger sister, Pauline Grymes, was married to the wealthy German industrialist Baron Ferdinand Eduard von Stumm whose family owned the Neunkirchen Iron and Steelworks in 1878. Her nephew was the German diplomat Ferdinand Carl von Stumm, who married another American heiress, Constance Hoyt (daughter of Solicitor General Henry Hoyt Jr.).

Her maternal grandfather was John Randolph Grymes, the former U.S. Attorney for Western District of Louisiana under President James Madison. Her aunt, and namesake, Medora, was the second wife of banker and lobbyist Samuel Ward. Her uncle, Dr. C. Alfred Grymes, was married to Emma Stebbins (a daughter of U.S. Representative Henry George Stebbins), and, after her death, Mary Helen James (a granddaughter of Federal Vanderburgh and cousin of psychologist William James, author Henry James, and diarist Alice James).

== Personal life ==
In 1882, Medora was married to Antoine Amédée-Marie-Vincent Amat Manca de Vallombrosa, the Marquis de Morès, a French-born nobleman who was a frontier ranchman in the Badlands of Dakota Territory. They were the parents of three children, a daughter and two sons:

- Athenais Amat Manca (1883–1969), who married French Ambassador Louis M. Henry Pichon, Baron Pichon (1873–1933), at age 17. In 1929, Athenais married Baron de Graffenried; he died in 1936. She then married Henry Guerracina and moved to Argentina during World War II; returning to France in 1950, where she died in 1969.
- Louis Richard Amat Manca, Duke de Vallombrosa (1885–1959), who grew up in France and was educated at Yale University; he became a banker until 1936 when he retired and moved to Switzerland; he married Marie-Thérèse du Bourg de Bozas at Saint-Pierre-de-Chaillot Church, in October 1917.
- Count Paul Amat Manca de Morès de Vallombrosa (1890–1950), a Harvard graduate who became a banker with the Bankers Trust in Paris before becoming a partner in the Paris brokerage house of Saint Phalle & Co.; he married Ruth (née Obre) Goldbeck, widow of Walter Dean Goldbeck, an American portrait painter, and sister of Arthur Obre, in 1928. They divorced in 1935 and she married race car driver André Dubonnet in 1937.

After the assassination of the Marquis de Morès in 1896, the Marquise de Morès lived in both Paris and Cannes, France. During World War I, she turned her home into a hospital for wounded soldiers. She died at Cannes in 1921 of a leg injury she received while working as a nurse. The wound never fully healed. Others say she died of an infectious disease she acquired while touring India with her husband. This gave her bouts of illness throughout her life which eventually resulted in her death.

=== Legacy ===
The town of Medora, North Dakota, founded in 1883, was named by the Marquis in her honor. The Marquis's meat packing plant failed and the town fell into a decline after the family left. However, the story of the Marquis de Mores and Medora are now featured in The Medora Musical held every summer in Medora, a major tourist town in the North Dakota Badlands. The 26-room clapboard-sided ranch house the Marquis built for his heiress wife, known as the "Chateau de Mores", has been restored, and tours of it are given.
