= Mabel Memorial Chapel =

Building in Harrisonburg, Virginia, USA

Coordinates: 38°25′28.6″N 78°51′17.9″W

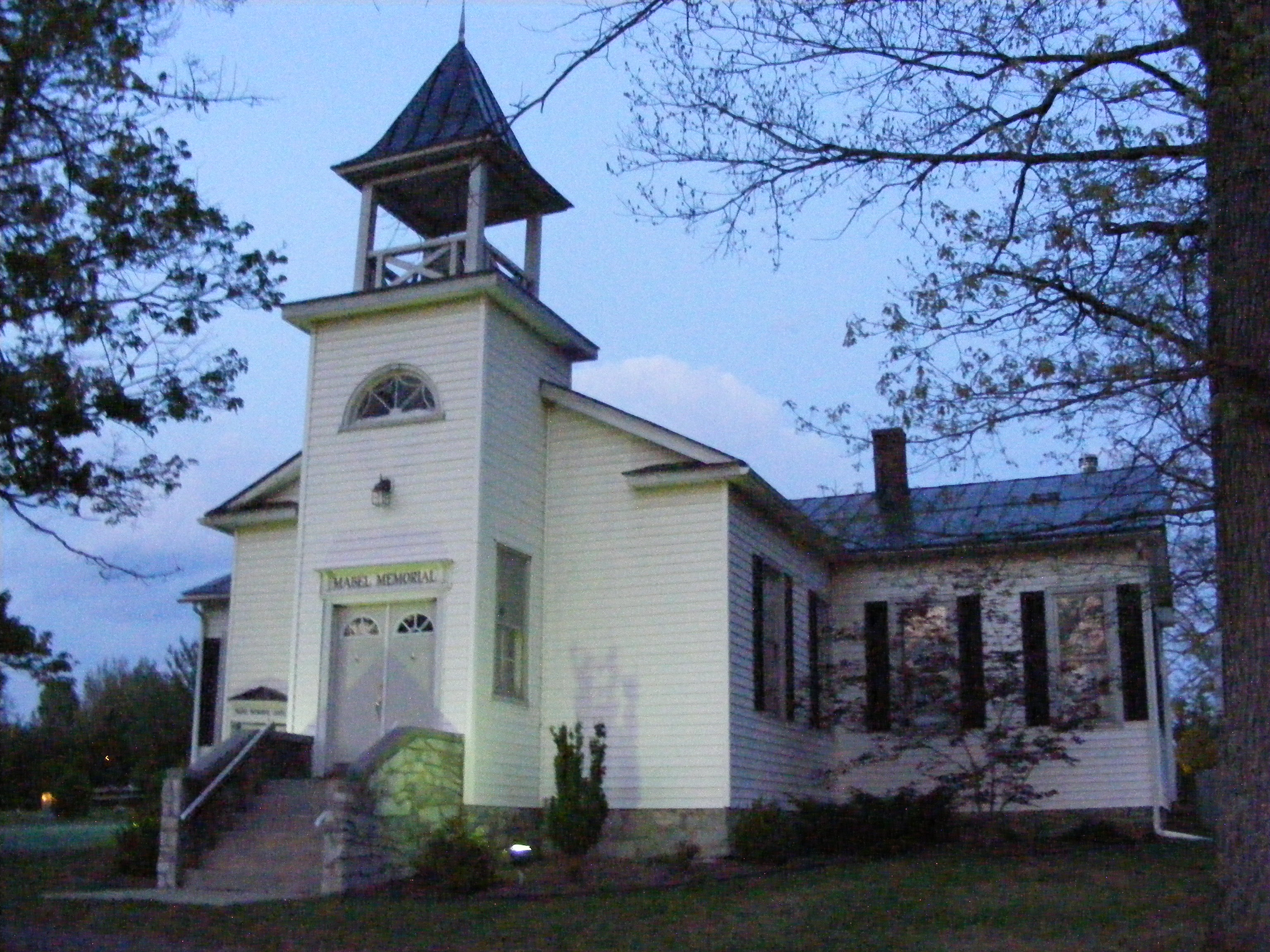
Mabel Memorial Chapel Midnight Full Moon before Easter 2007

Mabel Memorial Chapel is located in Harrisonburg, Virginia and was built in 1898. It is located in the former village of Chestnut Ridge.

== History ==
=== Origin ===
U.S. Naval Surgeon Lucien Guy Heneberger provided all the building materials and much of the labor. He asked that the chapel be named in honor of his wife Mabel Grymes Heneberger who died after giving birth to their first child. Heneberger also built Mabel Memorial Schoolhouse, a one-room school, adjacent to the Mabel Memorial Chapel.

The land for the chapel, schoolhouse, and cemetery was donated by Moses Wenger in 1898. The deed was registered in the Clerk’s Office on November 3, 1898, and was held in trust with the Presbyterian Church of Harrisonburg and Presbyterian Church of USA (PCUSA).

Outdoor services were reportedly held for up to a decade before the doors of the chapel opened in 1899. Services were held in the chapel for 108 years.

Accounts report that the chapel’s bell was recovered from another chapel that burned down during the Civil War period. A letter from David Edwards of Virginia Department of Historic Resources makes note of this.

A history of the chapel dated 1946 by “Miss Virginia Converse, Mrs. Hugh Tobin, Committee, Miss Harriet Garber, Historian” records the aforementioned historical information in addition to other information detailing the founders and benefactors of the chapel, in particular the charity and generosity of Lucien G. Heneberger.

Closing and Controversy

In fall 2006, the more than century-old metal roof began to leak. The Mabel Memorial Chapel congregation informed First Presbyterian Church of the roof leak and inquired about using the chapel’s trust funds for repairs. First Presbyterian Church declined offers made to repair the chapel at no cost. Soon after Easter services 2007, the mostly elderly congregation was locked out of their chapel by First Presbyterian Church. For a while, the Mabel Memorial Chapel congregation continued to hold services outside of their chapel in hopes that First Presbyterian Church of Harrisonburg would re-open the doors to the historic chapel.

The chapel remains threatened with demolition due to the large-scale commercial development in the area.

Despite approval to be listed on the national register of historic places, the adjacent Mabel Memorial Schoolhouse was demolished July 2013. The first application to landmark the Mabel Memorial Chapel was filed in 2007 with the Virginia Department of Historic Resources. To date, the Commonwealth of Virginia has taken no action to protect or landmark the Mabel Memorial Chapel.
