= Medora Musical =

Annual musical revue

Coordinates: 46°54′52″N 103°32′44″W

Medora
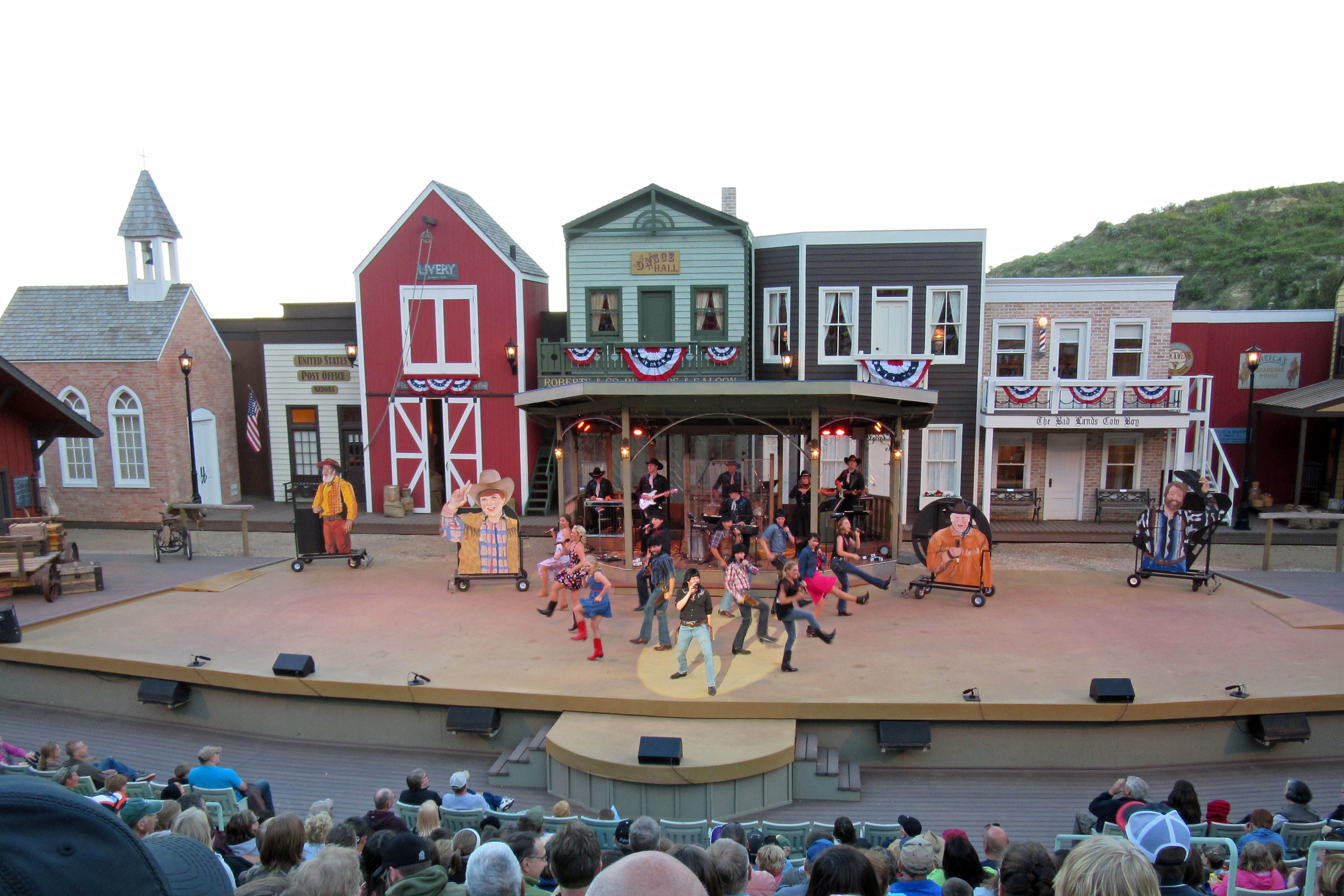
- The Medora Musical at the Burning Hills Amphitheater in June 2014.
- Music: Burning Hills Singers; Coal Diggers Band
- Setting: Medora, North Dakota; Theodore Roosevelt National Park
- Basis: Life and travels of President Theodore Roosevelt in the Dakota Territory
- Premiere: Summer 1965: Burning Hills Amphitheater

The Medora Musical is a musical revue produced each summer at the open-air Burning Hills Amphitheater near Medora, North Dakota. The musical is a look back at the "Wild West" days of the region and includes references to Theodore Roosevelt, who spent time in western North Dakota, including in the nearby Theodore Roosevelt National Park.

The musical premiered at the amphitheater in the summer of 1965 and is the successor to earlier shows about Roosevelt.

== History ==
The Burning Hills Amphitheater was built in 1958 one mile west of Medora, for the production of Old Four-Eyes, to help celebrate Theodore Roosevelt's 100th birthday. Thirty of the thirty-three performances were sold out.

Following its first season, 'Old Four-Eyes' experienced declining interest, leading to its closure in 1964. The show was replaced by 'Teddy Roosevelt Rides Again' for the 1963 and 1964 seasons.

In 1965, businessman Harold Schafer purchased the amphitheater, marking a new era for the venue. Under Schafer's ownership, the amphitheater underwent renovations, including an expansion of the stage and seating area, in preparation for the launch of the Medora Musical in the same year.

In 1986 the Schafer family and the Gold Seal company donated their share in Medora to the Theodore Roosevelt Medora Foundation (TRMF). The foundation maintains the amphitheater and historical properties and other projects.

From its inception in 1965, the Medora Musical was produced by Al Sheehan Productions under the direction of Harold Schafer. This partnership continued until 1991 when Curt Wollan and StageWest Entertainment assumed the role of producer. Starting in 2024, RWS Global will take over the production of the Medora Musical.

== Burning Hills Amphitheater ==
The amphitheater was carved out of the side of the badlands in Burning Gulch by local volunteers, cast members and boys from the Home on the Range Ranch. The original theater seated between 1,000, and 1,200 people. It was constructed of wooden benches on the hillside with rustic buildings that formed a set around the stage. The natural acoustics of the hillside meant that no sound system would be needed.

In 1991, the amphitheater received a $4.1 million facelift which enlarged the seating to 2,863, built new stage, installed escalators, and a wheelchair ramp. The new Burning Hills Amphitheater was completed in 1992 with the installation of new seats. Additional construction was completed in 1997.

In 2005 another major renovation was made to the sets and the stage, resulting in the modernized appearance and functionality of the amphitheater as it stands today.

A high-capacity elevator was added to the amphitheater in 2022 to improve accessibility and access to the venue.

== Former show names ==
- Ol’ Four Eyes 1958-1962
- Teddy Roosevelt Rides Again 1963-1964
- Medora Musical 1965–present

== See also ==
- List of contemporary amphitheatres
