= Philip Grymes =

American lawyer (d. 1818)

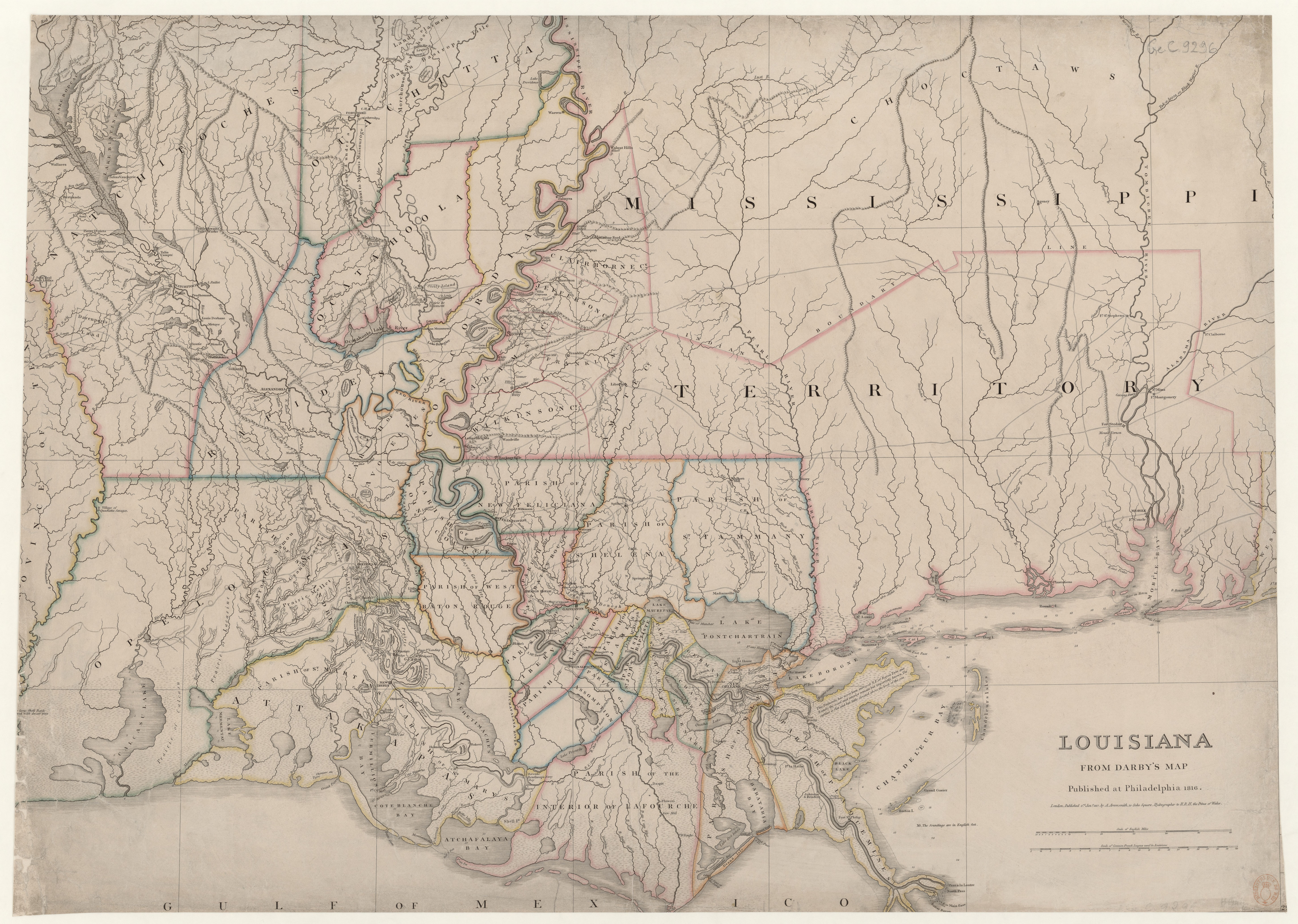
Darby's map of Louisiana (1816)

Philip Grymes (c. 1777 – July 21, 1818) was an American lawyer who served as United States Attorney for the District of Louisiana for two years, from 1808 to 1810.

== Life and career ==
Grymes was from Virginia, and his family name was already an old name in Virginia society before the American Revolutionary War. Upon arriving in Louisiana he reported back to the national government that evasions of the Embargo Act were "numerous and most flagrant in this District." In his first year as federal attorney, he faced off against James Workman, a stern critic of the administration of W. C. C. Claiborne, in a case involving access to the New Orleans batture. Workman's client, Edward Livingston, claimed private ownership of the batture. Workman objected to "allegations that he opposed the government...Incensed, Grymes threw an ink well at Workman, spraying several surprised observers." Both Grymes and Workman were fined and jailed for eight hours, and then duel challenges were issued and argumentative pamphlets published, which led to "Workman's disbarment when Judge [Joshua] Lewis felt Workman misquoted him as to Grymes' misconduct."

Grymes was viewed as soft on the Batrarian pirates led by Jean Lafitte and Pierre Lafitte. During his service as attorney he ordered seizure and sale of the land that in 1815 came to be known as the Chalmette battlefield, as the site of the Battle of New Orleans. In 1810 Thomas Jefferson wrote a letter of recommendation to him regarding a neighbor's son, John H. Carr. The same year he served with Judge Lewis, and Thomas Robertson, on the land claims commission charged with reviewing land claims made under the Spanish and French land grant systems that existed prior to American control of Louisiana.

He resigned his post on March 18, 1810. On September 25, 1810, Grymes dueled lawyer Stephen A. Hopkins at Manchac, West Florida and took a bullet through the chest. They thought he would die, but he lived.

His brother John R. Grymes was also a Louisiana lawyer. Grymes eventually returned to his home state of Virginia where he died in 1818.

== See also ==
- List of duels in the United States

== Sources ==
- Beauchamp, M. K. (2021). Instruments of empire: colonial elites and U.S. governance in early national Louisiana, 1803–1815. Baton Rouge (La.): Louisiana State University Press. ISBN 978-0-8071-7428-9.
- Faber, Eberhard L. (2016). Building the land of dreams: New Orleans and the transformation of early America. Princeton (N.J.): Princeton University Press. ISBN 978-0-691-16689-6.
- Watson, Samuel J. (2012). Jackson's Sword: The Army Officer Corps on the American Frontier, 1810–1821. Modern War Studies. Lawrence: University Press of Kansas. ISBN 978-0-7006-1884-2.
