= Marquis de Morès =

French duelist, frontier ranchman, railroad pioneer and politician

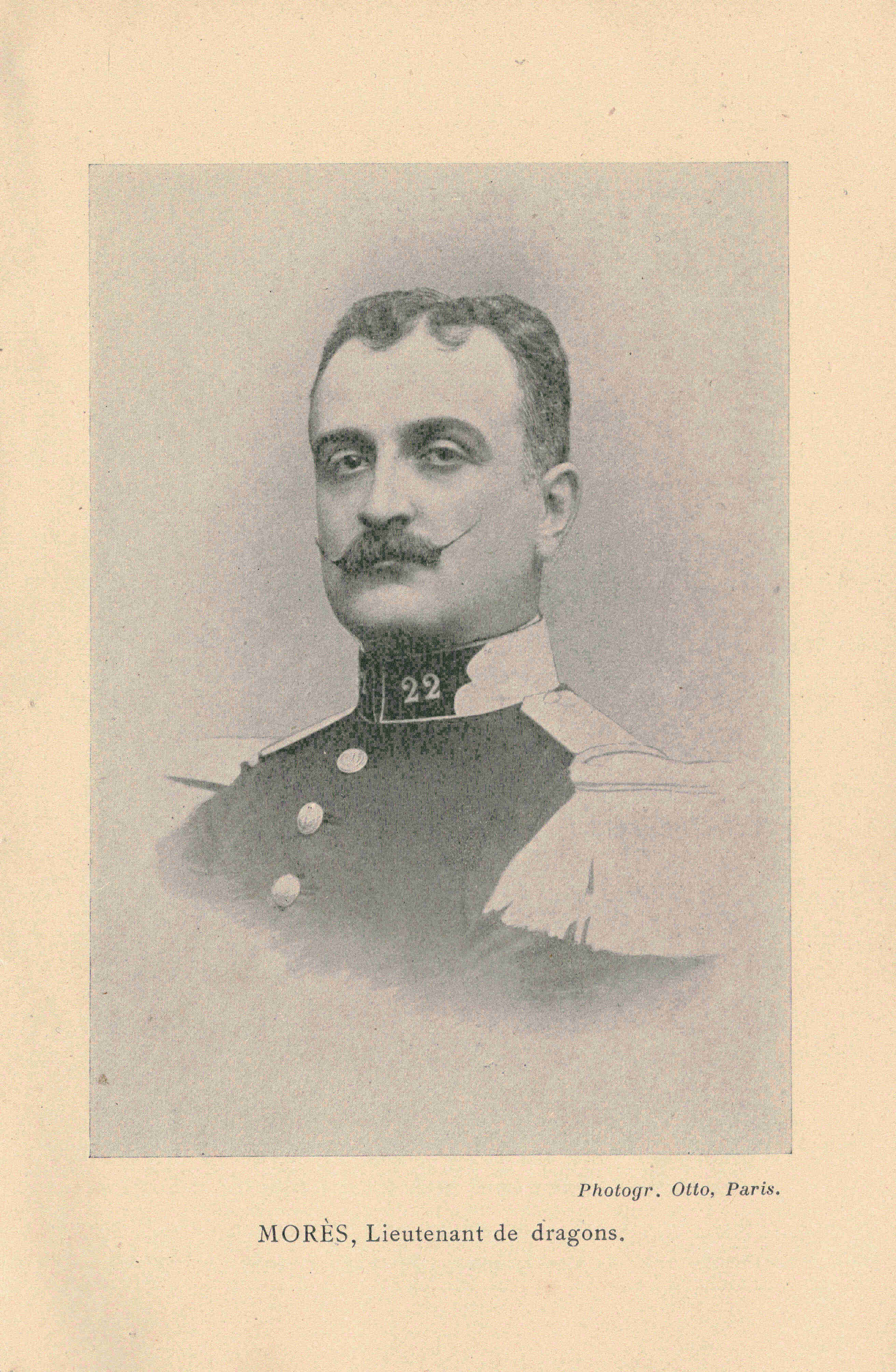

Personal details
- Born: Antoine Amédée-Marie-Vincent Manca-Amat; 14 June 1858 Paris, French Empire
- Died: 9 June 1896 (aged 37) Sahara Desert
- Spouse: Medora von Hoffman
- Children: 3
- Education: École spéciale militaire de Saint-Cyr
- Occupation: Duelist; Entrepreneur; Politician

Military service
- Allegiance: France
- Branch/service: French Army
- Years of service: 1880–1882
- Rank: Lieutenant

Antoine Amédée-Marie-Vincent Manca-Amat, Marquis de Morès (14 June 1858 – 9 June 1896) was a French duelist, frontier ranchman in the Badlands of Dakota Territory during the final years of the American Old West era, a railroad pioneer in Vietnam, and politician in his native France.

== Early life, family and education ==
Antoine-Amédée-Marie-Vincent Manca Amat de Vallombrosa was born on 14 June 1858. As the eldest son of the Duke of Vallombrosa, he used the courtesy title Marquis de Morès et de Montemaggiore, but he was usually called Marquis de Morès.

His father was Richard Manca di Vallombrosa, a Sardinian nobleman who moved to France. He was a direct descendant of Don Antonio Manca y Amat, an influential Sardinian feudal lord, linking his lineage to the northern territories of the island, while his mother was Pauline Geneviève de Pérusse, Duchess des Cars, a member of a historic French aristocratic family.

Morès began his adult life as a soldier, graduating in 1879 from St. Cyr, the leading military academy of France. Among his classmates was Philippe Pétain, famous French general of World War I and the ill-fated future leader of the Vichy France government in World War II.

After St. Cyr, he entered Saumur Cavalry School, France's premier cavalry school, where he trained to be an officer. He was later sent to Algiers, helping to put down an uprising. It was while in Algiers that he had his first duel, starting his career as a celebrated duelist of his day.

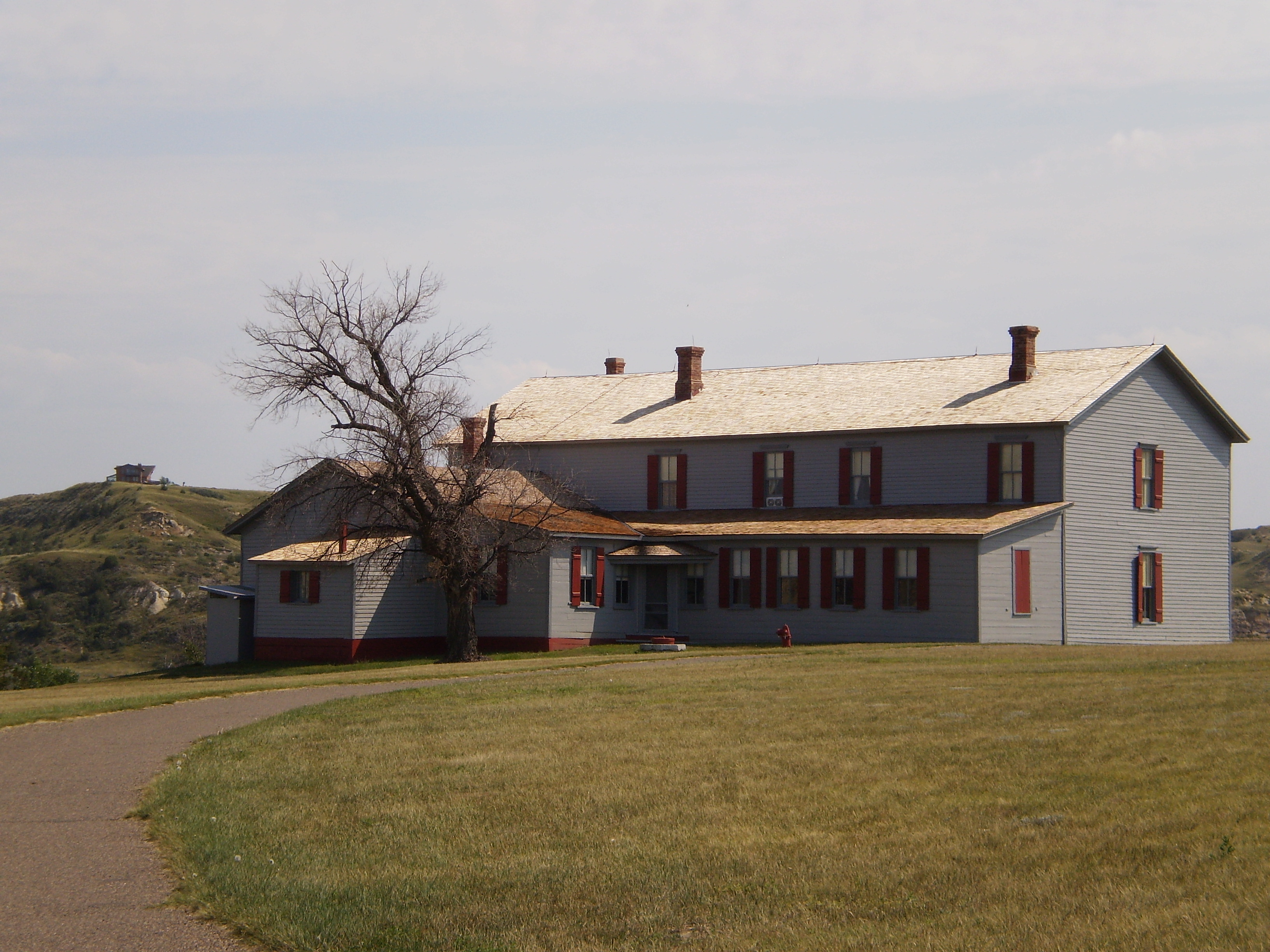
The "Chateau de Mores" in Medora, North Dakota

== The Badlands ==
He resigned from the cavalry in 1882 and married Medora von Hoffman (1856–1921), sometimes called the Marquise, the daughter of a New York banker. They were the parents of three children, a daughter and two sons:

- Athenais Amat Manca (1883–1969), who married French Ambassador Louis M. Henry Pichon, Baron Pichon (1873–1933), at age 17. In 1929, Athenais married Baron de Graffenried; he died in 1936. She then married Henry Guerracina and moved to Argentina during World War II; returning to France in 1950, where she died in 1969.
- Louis Richard Amat Manca, Duke de Vallombrosa (1885–1959), who grew up in France and was educated at Yale University; he became a banker until 1936 when he retired and moved to Switzerland; he married Marie-Thérèse du Bourg de Bozas at Saint-Pierre-de-Chaillot Church, in October 1917.
- Count Paul Amat Manca de Morès de Vallombrosa (1890–1950), a Harvard graduate who became a banker with the Bankers Trust in Paris before becoming a partner in the Paris brokerage house of Saint Phalle & Co.; he married Ruth (née Obre) Goldbeck, widow of Walter Dean Goldbeck, an American portrait painter, and sister of Arthur Obre, in 1928. They divorced in 1935 and she married race car driver André Dubonnet in 1937.

Soon after the marriage, he moved to the North Dakota badlands to begin ranching, purchasing 44,500 acres (180 km^{2}) for that purpose. He also opened a stagecoach business. He named his two-story 26-room wood-frame house in Medora, North Dakota, the "Chateau de Mores"; it is preserved as a historic house there.

He tried to revolutionize the ranching industry by shipping refrigerated meat to Chicago by railroad, thus bypassing the Chicago stockyards. He built a meat-packing plant for this purpose in Medora, the town he founded in 1883 and named for his wife.

The railroads, undoubtedly working hand in glove with the Chicago beef trust, refused to grant him the same rebates on freight rates they gave his competitors, adding to his costs. And range-fed—on grass—beef turned out to be less popular with consumers than beef that had been fattened—on corn—in the stockyards of Chicago. The marquis's father-in-law withdrew his financial backing and soon the packing plant closed. Not long after, just as winter was settling in on the Bad Lands in 1886, de Mores and his wife left Medora for good. The short-lived reign of the Emperor of the Bad Lands was over.

Footnote:

Back in France, the Marquis claimed the Chicago beef trust was dominated by Jews and announced himself the victim of "A Jewish Plot." Turning to politics, he organized a movement that mixed socialism with rabid anti-semitism that fed the French collective mania which led to the Dreyfus affair. On 23 June 1892, he killed a Jewish captain, Armand Mayer, during a duel. In 1896 (after ten years), he was killed by North African tribesmen while carrying out a wild scheme to unite the Muslims in a Holy War against the British and the Jews.

— Nathan Miller, Theodore Roosevelt: A Life

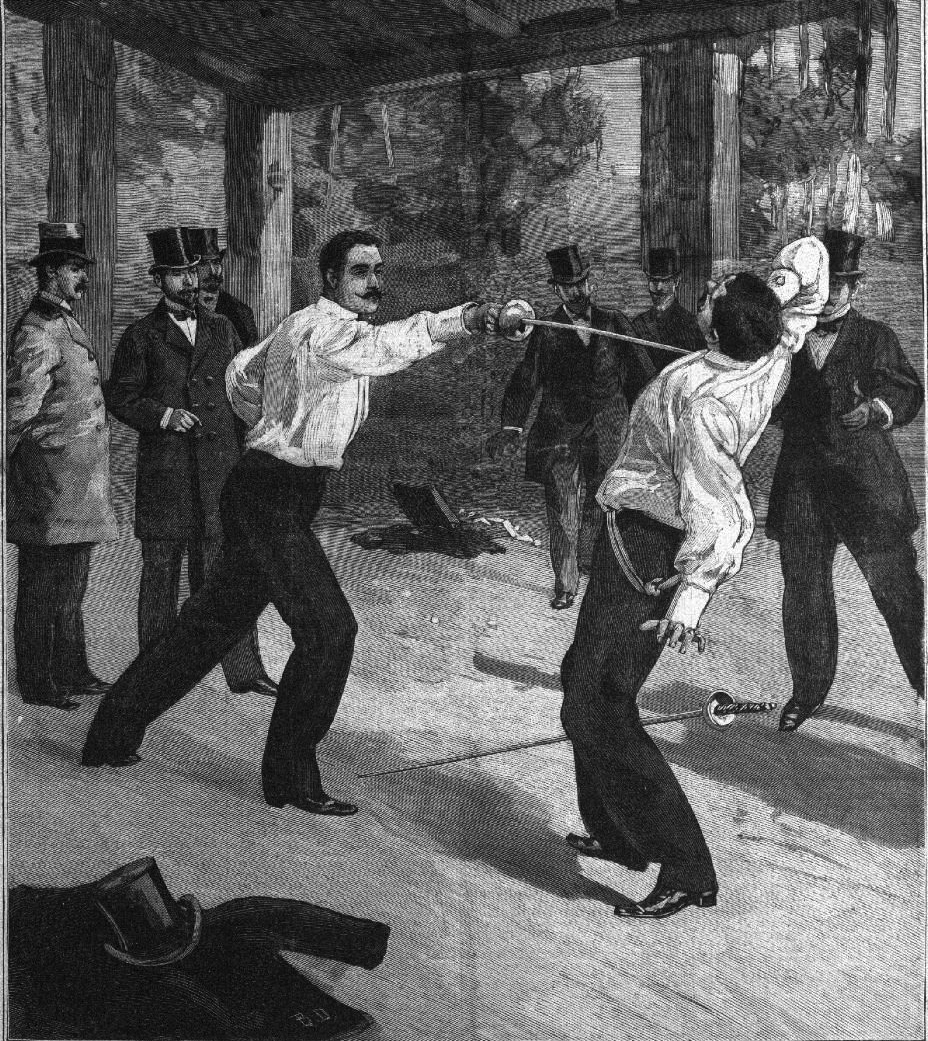
Duel between the Marquis de Morès and Captain Mayer, front page of Le Petit Parisien Illustré (July 3, 1892)

He became famous in the West as a rancher and gunslinger. He was arrested for murder a few times but was always acquitted. Known as an adventurer, he was quick to anger and was engaged in numerous duels throughout his life; he notoriously sent Theodore Roosevelt what the latter interpreted as a challenge to a duel. Roosevelt assured the Marquis by letter that he was “most emphatically” not his enemy, and nothing came of the matter.

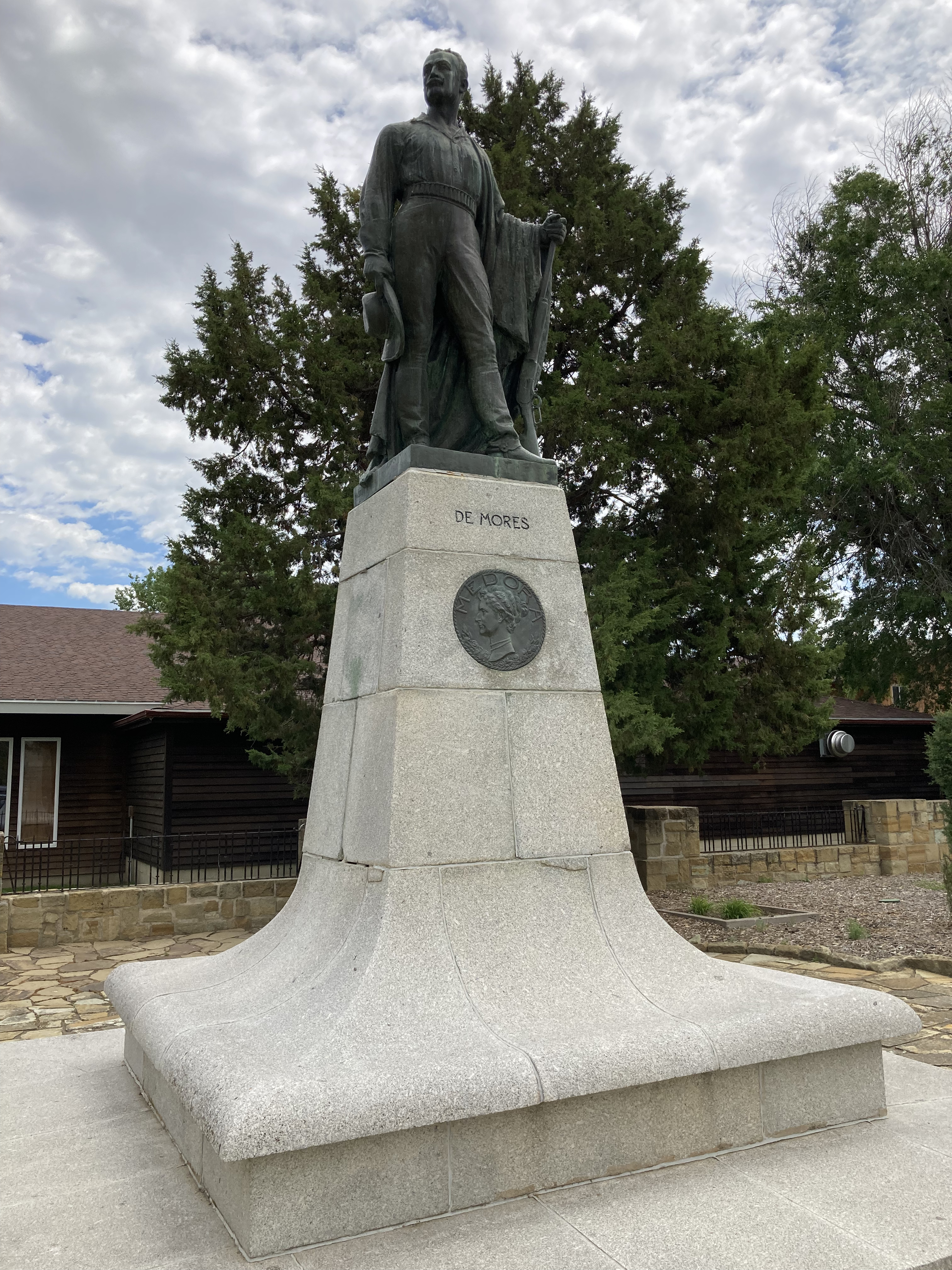
Statue of the Marquis de Morès in Medora

Outlaws were very numerous in the Badlands, and cattle and horse rustling had become common. Frontiersman Granville Stuart organized a vigilance committee to fight the rustlers. De Morès told Roosevelt of the plan, and the two offered their services to be vigilantes. Stuart declined, stating that de Morès and Roosevelt were both well known and their presence could ruin the element of surprise. Stuart's vigilantes, called The Stranglers, struck against the rustlers, weakening their power in the Badlands.

By 1885, de Morès' business was failing. He was losing a business war against the beef trust, and the enterprise collapsed. He later sold the ranch and other assets in the Badlands.

== Gulf of Tonkin ==
Subsequently, he left Dakota Territory and returned to France. He was commissioned by the French army to build a railroad in Vietnam, from the Chinese frontier to the Gulf of Tonkin, and arrived in Asia to lead construction in the fall of 1888. He observed the Vietnamese people, and cautioned the French to be kind to them. He wrote, "The colonization of Tonkin will not be accomplished with rifles, but with public works."

He believed a railroad was needed there, and hoped to have one extending all the way to Yunnan Province in China. This was partly a reaction to a British railroad being built from Burma to China.

Political intrigue, being notorious in France in that day, impeded construction of the railroad. A prime minister was deposed, which led to a new undersecretary of the navy, Jean Constans, who opposed de Morès' plan from the start. The Marquis was recalled to France in 1889, and the railroad project was ruined.

== Politics and maneuvers in France ==
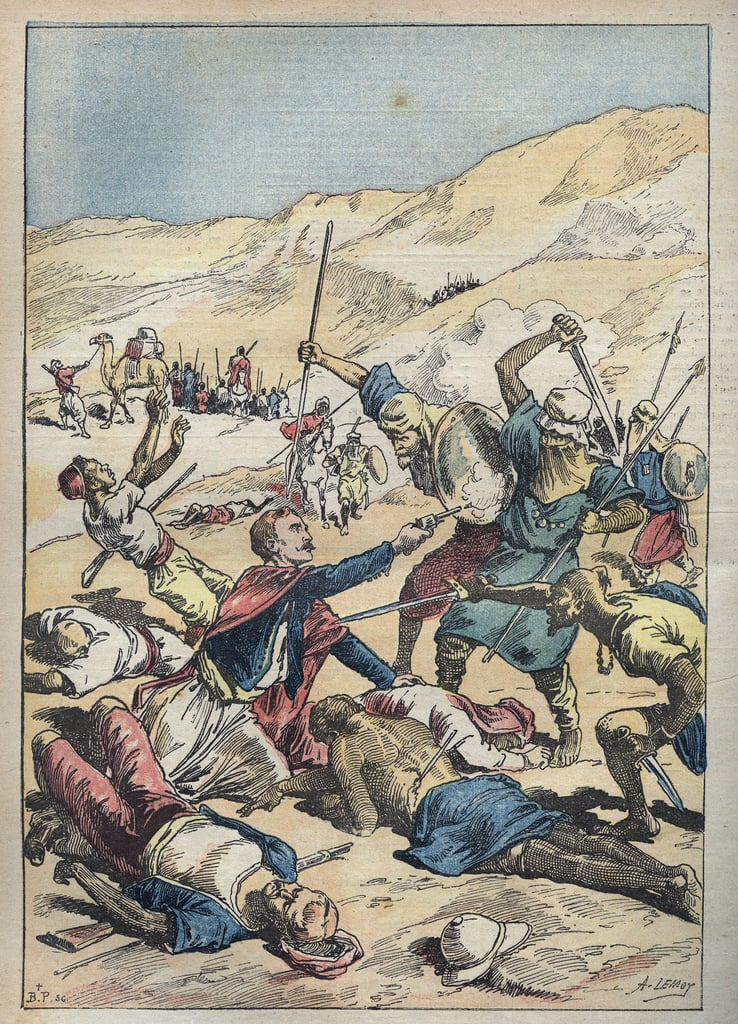
Death of the Marquis of Mores (illustration in Le-Pelerin, 1896)

Upon his return, he was embroiled in political controversies for the remainder of his life.

He started by attacking Constans, enlisting the aid of Georges Clemenceau, but failed to unseat him in the next election. His politics became overtly antisemitic, and he challenged Ferdinand-Camille Dreyfus, a Jewish member of the Chamber of Deputies, to a duel after Dreyfus wrote an article attacking him. De Morès said he wanted Gaul for the Gauls, and Dreyfus replied by writing that de Morès had a Spanish title, a father with an Italian title, and an American wife who was neither Christian nor French. At the duel Dreyfus fired first and missed, and the Marquis wounded his opponent in the arm.

In 1889, de Morès joined La Ligue antisémitique de France (Antisemitic League of France) founded by Edouard Drumont. After more verbal attacks on Jews, he went to Algeria to strengthen the French hold there and stop British advances into the interior of Africa.

== Algeria ==
He used anti-semitic rhetoric to his advantage in Algeria, giving speeches claiming that French and African Jews and the British were conspiring to conquer the entire Sahara Desert. With the British in a difficult position in the Sudan after the death of General Charles George Gordon in the siege of Khartoum, de Morès planned a trip there to meet with the Mahdi, a powerful Muslim leader who was intent on undermining British hegemony in the region. He traveled to North Africa, selected Arabic men in Tunis to escort him, and set out his caravan towards Kebili.

The French officer in charge of the post at Kebili, Lieutenant Leboeuf, received a telegram from the French Intelligence Officer and Military attaché in Tunis, advising him not to give de Morès' expedition any assistance. Furthermore, Leboeuf was told to ensure de Morès traveled by the way of the Berresof oasis. A marabout from Guemar dispatched a messenger to dissident Tuareg in Messine, southeast of Ghadames, telling them to come to Berresof at once to kill a Frenchman. The recipients of the message were told the man they were to kill would be carrying a great deal of money, would not have an official escort, and that whoever killed him would not be prosecuted. While he was in Kebili, de Morès received a telegram from General de la Roque, commander of the division at Constantine, Algeria, telling him that Tuareg guides would be waiting for him at Berresof. De Morès expressed surprise at this, as he had not asked de la Roque to find him any guides. De Morès departed Kebili on May 20, and the Tuareg "guides" joined his caravan on June 3. On the morning of June 9, 1896, the Tuareg sprung their attack. De Morès was able to kill several of his attackers before he was gunned down.

On 28 July 1902, after a trial in Sousse in Tunisia, two of the murderers were sentenced: El-Kheir ben Abd-el-Kader to the death penalty and Hamma Ben Cheikh to 20 years of forced labor. During the trial his widow, the Marquise, sought to expose the French government as responsible for the murder but the tribunal did not agree. She then even paid Isabelle Eberhardt to return to Africa to investigate his death, though Eberhardt made no real attempts to investigate the matter, and no government official was ever convicted.

== Depictions in fiction ==
The Marquis de Morès is portrayed by the actor Jeff DuJardin in the 2024 television series Elkhorn.

He is portrayed by the actor Robert Strange in the 2026 movie Medora: Empress of the Badlands.

== Legacy ==
In 2005, Robert O. Paxton released The Anatomy of Fascism, which cited Morès as a symbol of early National Socialism. "His [Morès] squads wore the cow-boy garb and ten-gallon hats that the Marquis had discovered in the American West, which thus predate black and brown shirts (by a modest stretch of the imagination) as the first fascist uniform".

== See also ==
- De Mores Memorial Park, Medora, North Dakota, listed on the U.S. National Register of Historic Places (NRHP)
- De Mores Packing Plant Ruins, NRHP-listed
- Chateau de Mores, built 1883, Medora, North Dakota, NRHP-listed
- Von Hoffman House, Medora, North Dakota, NRHP-listed

== Sources ==
- Dresden, Donald (1970). The Marquis de Morès: Emperor of the Bad Lands. Norman, Oklahoma: University of Oklahoma Press.
- Pascal, Félicien (1902). L'assassinat de Morès: Un crime d'état. Paris: Hardy & Bernard.
- NPS: Theodore Roosevelt and the Dakota Badlands
- Bodley, R.V.C. (1968). The Soundless Sahara. Robert Hale Limited. ISBN 978-0-7091-0066-9.
- Paxton, Robert (2005). Anatomy of Fascism. New York: Vintage books, a division of Random House.
