= Medora, North Dakota =

- City
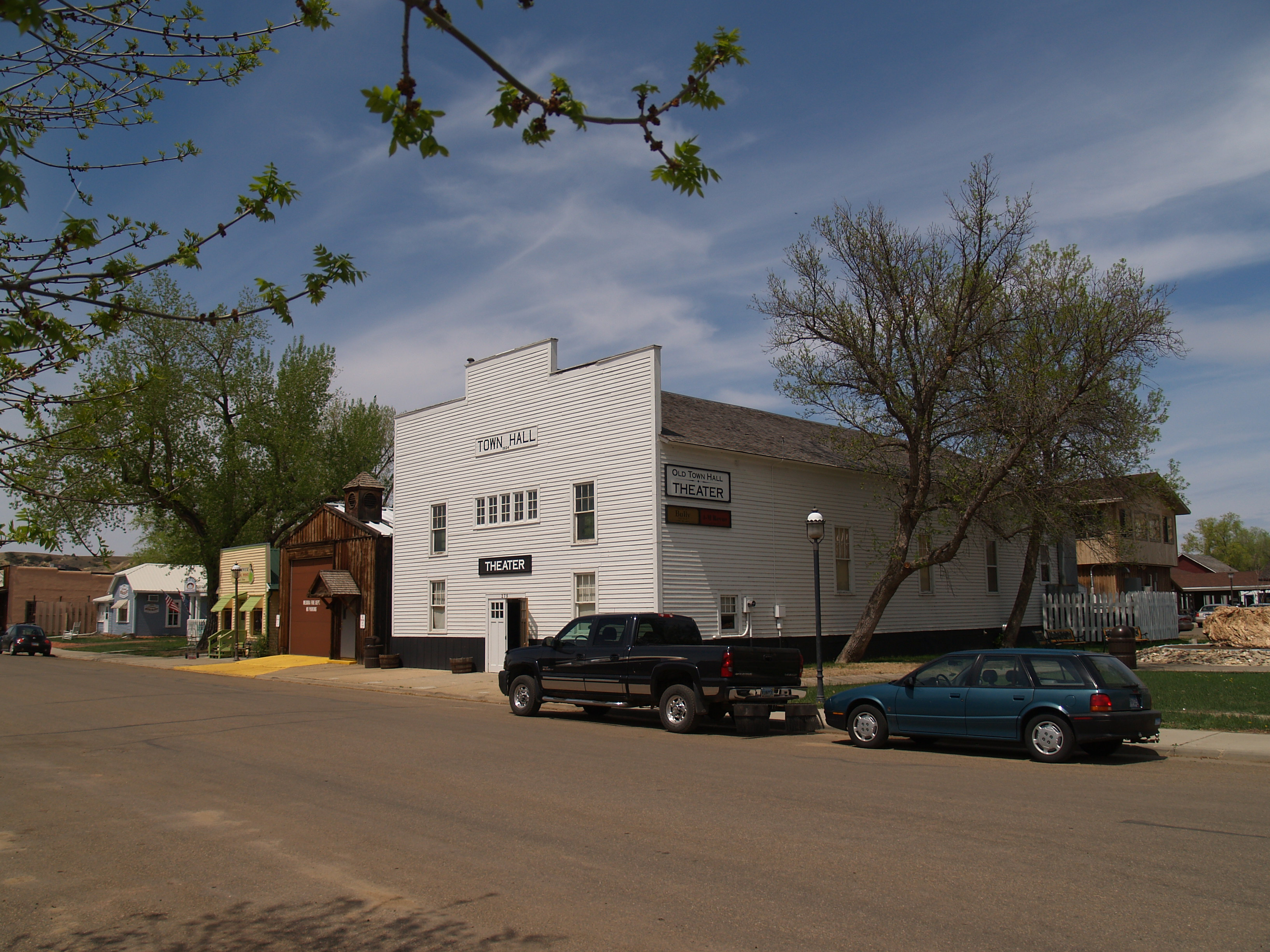
- Business District of Medora (2008)
- Motto: "North Dakota's #1 Destination"
- Location of Medora, North Dakota
- Coordinates: 46.911261°N 103.526517°W
- Country: United States
- State: North Dakota
- County: Billings
- Founded: 1883
- Named for: Medora de Morès

Government
  - Mayor: Todd Corneil

Area
  - Total: 0.414 sq mi (1.072 km^{2})
  - Land: 0.393 sq mi (1.018 km^{2})
  - Water: 0.021 sq mi (0.054 km^{2}) 5.07%
- Elevation: 2,270 ft (692 m)

Population (2020)
  - Total: 121
  - Estimate (2024): 160
  - Density: 407.2/sq mi (157.21/km^{2})
- Time zone: UTC–7 (Mountain (MST))
  - Summer (DST): UTC–6 (MDT)
- ZIP Code: 58645
- Area code: 701
- FIPS code: 38-51900
- GNIS feature ID: 1036158
- Website: www.medorand.gov

Medora (/mɪˈdɔːrə/, mih-DOR-ə) is a city in Billings County, North Dakota, United States. The only incorporated place in Billings County, it is also the county seat. Much of the surrounding area is part of either Little Missouri National Grassland or Theodore Roosevelt National Park. The population was 160 in a 2024 census. It is part of the Dickinson Micropolitan Statistical Area. Medora is home to the South unit of Theodore Roosevelt National Park and the Theodore Roosevelt Presidential Library, Bully Pulpit Golf Course, Chateau de Mores, and home to Rough Rider State Park (formerly Sully Creek State Park), and to the seasonal Medora Musical at the Burning Hills Amphitheater. It is a popular tourist destination during summer.

== History ==
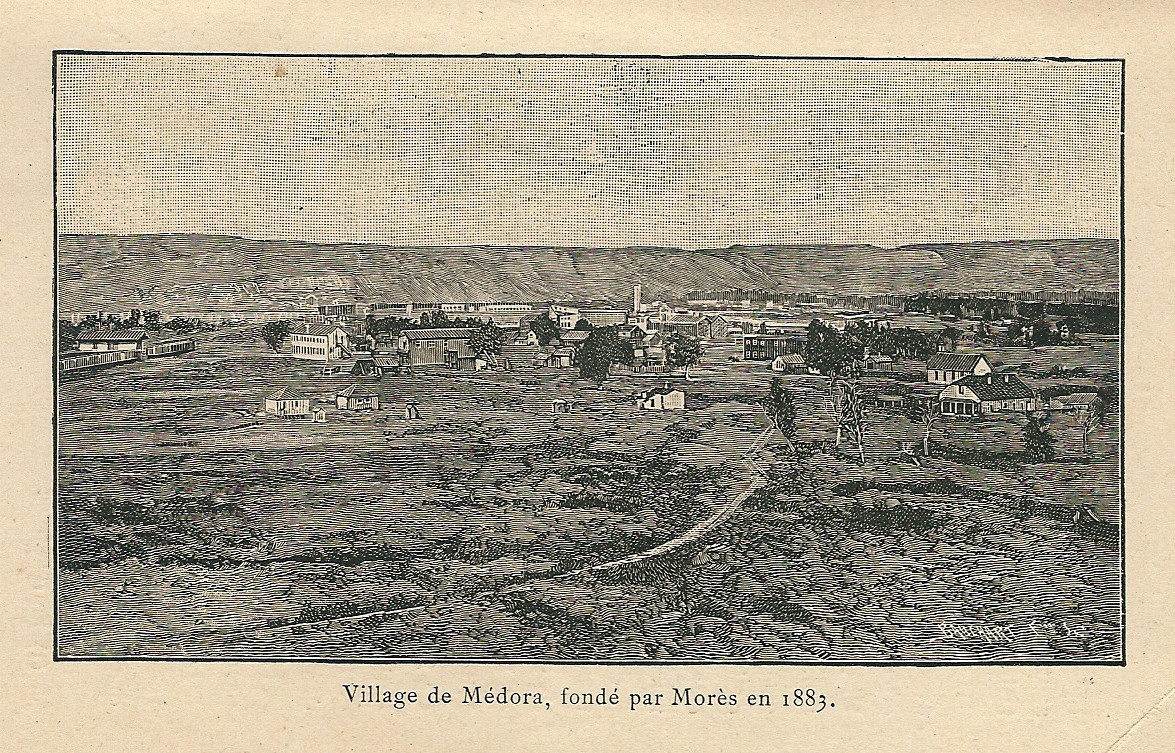

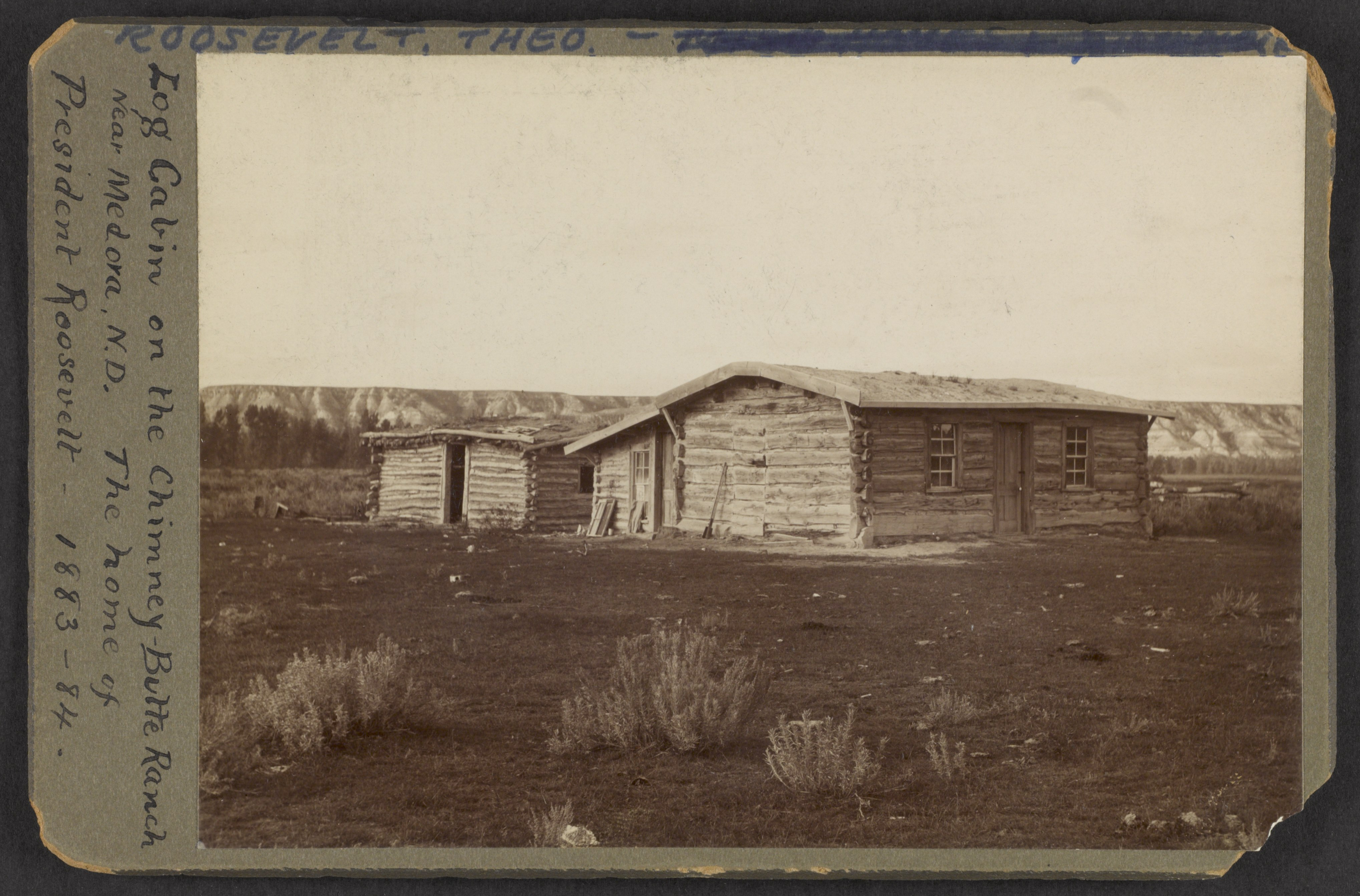
Log cabin on the Chimney-Butte Ranch near Medora, c. 1904

Medora was founded in 1883 along the transcontinental rail line of the Northern Pacific Railway by French nobleman Marquis de Mores, who named the city after his wife Medora von Hoffman. Marquis de Mores wanted to ship refrigerated meat to Chicago via the railroad. He built a meat packing plant for this purpose and a house named the Chateau de Mores, which became a museum.

In the evening of April 7, 1903, President Theodore Roosevelt, who had visited and invested in ranches in the area in the 1880s, visited Medora on a presidential tour of the Western United States. Most of the Badlands' residents turned out to greet him on his whistle stop. Roosevelt later recalled that "the entire population of the Badlands down to the smallest baby had gathered to meet me… They all felt I was their man, their old friend; and even if they had been hostile to me in the old days when we were divided by the sinister bickering and jealousies and hatreds of all frontier communities, they now firmly believed they had always been my staunch friends and admirers. I shook hands with them all and…I only regretted that I could not spend three hours with them." A local hotel changed its name that same year to the Rough Riders Hotel. In 1962 the hotel was purchased by Harold Schafer. After the creation of the Theodore Roosevelt Medora Foundation in 1986, the hotel changed hands and is operated by the Theodore Roosevelt Medora Foundation.

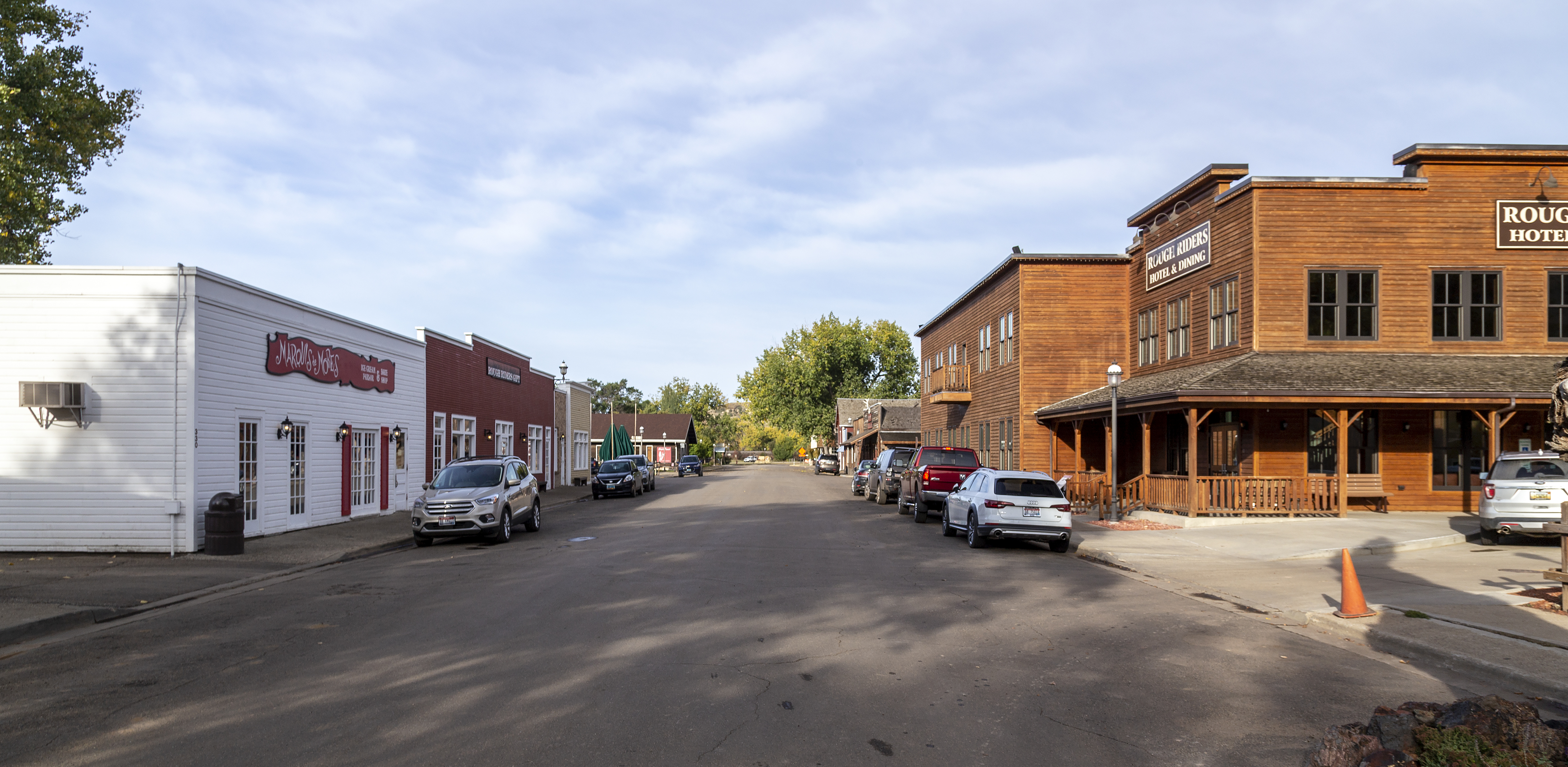
Downtown Medora

In April 2021, a wildfire threatened Medora and caused the town to evacuate during its tourist season. The fire burned 2,276 acres around Medora but spared the town.

Medora is home to the Medora Musical, which has become a tourist attraction in the state.

== Geography ==
According to the United States Census Bureau, the city has a total area of 0.414 square miles (1.07 km^{2}), of which 0.393 square miles (1.02 km^{2}) is land and 0.021 square miles (0.05 km^{2}) (5.07%) is water.

=== Climate ===
According to the Köppen climate classification system, Medora has a cold semi-arid climate (BSk).

Climate data for Medora, North Dakota (1991–2020 normals, extremes 1893–present)
Month	Jan	Feb	Mar	Apr	May	Jun	Jul	Aug	Sep	Oct	Nov	Dec	Year
Record high °F (°C)	70 (21)	70 (21)	86 (30)	95 (35)	104 (40)	107 (42)	114 (46)	114 (46)	107 (42)	95 (35)	88 (31)	66 (19)	114 (46)
Mean maximum °F (°C)	51.7 (10.9)	54.7 (12.6)	68.6 (20.3)	78.9 (26.1)	86.3 (30.2)	93.4 (34.1)	99.1 (37.3)	99.8 (37.7)	95.1 (35.1)	81.9 (27.7)	65.6 (18.7)	53.0 (11.7)	102.0 (38.9)
Mean daily maximum °F (°C)	27.6 (−2.4)	31.9 (−0.1)	43.7 (6.5)	55.5 (13.1)	66.7 (19.3)	76.7 (24.8)	85.6 (29.8)	85.2 (29.6)	74.4 (23.6)	57.5 (14.2)	42.4 (5.8)	30.9 (−0.6)	56.5 (13.6)
Daily mean °F (°C)	15.5 (−9.2)	19.8 (−6.8)	31.1 (−0.5)	42.5 (5.8)	53.6 (12.0)	63.4 (17.4)	70.8 (21.6)	69.2 (20.7)	58.6 (14.8)	43.8 (6.6)	30.2 (−1.0)	19.1 (−7.2)	43.1 (6.2)
Mean daily minimum °F (°C)	3.4 (−15.9)	7.7 (−13.5)	18.4 (−7.6)	29.5 (−1.4)	40.5 (4.7)	50.1 (10.1)	55.9 (13.3)	53.2 (11.8)	42.8 (6.0)	30.1 (−1.1)	18.1 (−7.7)	7.3 (−13.7)	29.8 (−1.2)
Mean minimum °F (°C)	−22.2 (−30.1)	−14.9 (−26.1)	−5.8 (−21.0)	12.3 (−10.9)	25.5 (−3.6)	37.9 (3.3)	45.1 (7.3)	39.9 (4.4)	28.1 (−2.2)	13.1 (−10.5)	−2.1 (−18.9)	−16.0 (−26.7)	−28.4 (−33.6)
Record low °F (°C)	−52 (−47)	−50 (−46)	−34 (−37)	−13 (−25)	8 (−13)	28 (−2)	30 (−1)	28 (−2)	8 (−13)	−13 (−25)	−31 (−35)	−48 (−44)	−52 (−47)
Average precipitation inches (mm)	0.32 (8.1)	0.44 (11)	0.63 (16)	1.59 (40)	2.60 (66)	2.92 (74)	2.10 (53)	1.41 (36)	1.42 (36)	1.18 (30)	0.62 (16)	0.56 (14)	15.79 (401)
Average snowfall inches (cm)	4.4 (11)	7.2 (18)	3.8 (9.7)	3.4 (8.6)	0.4 (1.0)	0.0 (0.0)	0.0 (0.0)	0.0 (0.0)	0.1 (0.25)	1.8 (4.6)	3.0 (7.6)	6.0 (15)	30.1 (76)
Average precipitation days (≥ 0.01 in)	5.9	5.3	5.8	7.0	10.1	11.2	9.4	6.5	6.6	7.1	5.3	5.7	85.9
Average snowy days (≥ 0.1 in)	4.6	4.8	2.8	1.3	0.2	0.0	0.0	0.0	0.0	1.0	2.6	4.9	22.2
Source: NOAA

== Demographics ==
Historical population
Census	Pop.	Note	%±
1960	133		—
1970	129		−3.0%
1980	94		−27.1%
1990	101		7.4%
2000	100		−1.0%
2010	112		12.0%
2020	121		8.0%
2024 (est.)	160		32.2%
U.S. Decennial Census; 2020 Census

According to realtor website Zillow, the average price of a home as of May 31, 2025, in Medora is $314,495.

As of the 2023 American Community Survey, there are 71 estimated households in Medora with an average of 1.82 persons per household. The city has a median household income of $68,906. Approximately 10.7% of the city's population lives at or below the poverty line. Medora has an estimated 63.6% employment rate, with 28.2% of the population holding a bachelor's degree or higher and 100.0% holding a high school diploma.

The top five reported ancestries (people were allowed to report up to two ancestries, thus the figures will generally add to more than 100%) were English (100.0%), Spanish (0.0%), Indo-European (0.0%), Asian and Pacific Islander (0.0%), and Other (0.0%).

The median age in the city was 54.0 years.

Medora, North Dakota – racial and ethnic composition Note: the US Census treats Hispanic/Latino as an ethnic category. This table excludes Latinos from the racial categories and assigns them to a separate category. Hispanics/Latinos may be of any race.
Race / ethnicity (NH = non-Hispanic)	Pop. 2000	Pop. 2010	Pop. 2020	% 2000	% 2010	% 2020
White alone (NH)	99	105	107	99.00%	93.75%	88.43%
Black or African American alone (NH)	0	0	2	0.00%	0.00%	1.65%
Native American or Alaska Native alone (NH)	0	2	0	0.00%	1.79%	0.00%
Asian alone (NH)	0	4	2	0.00%	3.57%	1.65%
Pacific Islander alone (NH)	0	0	0	0.00%	0.00%	0.00%
Other race alone (NH)	0	0	0	0.00%	0.00%	0.00%
Mixed race or multiracial (NH)	0	1	4	0.00%	0.89%	3.31%
Hispanic or Latino (any race)	1	0	6	1.00%	0.00%	4.96%
Total	100	112	121	100.00%	100.00%	100.00%

=== 2020 census ===
As of the 2020 census, there were 121 people, 62 households, 36 families residing in the city. The population density was 307.89 inhabitants per square mile (118.9/km^{2}). There were 108 housing units at an average density of 274.81 per square mile (106.1/km^{2}). The racial makeup of the city was 90.08% White, 1.65% African American, 0.83% Native American, 1.65% Asian, 0.00% Pacific Islander, 0.00% from some other races and 5.79% from two or more races. Hispanic or Latino people of any race were 4.96% of the population.

=== 2010 census ===
As of the 2010 census, there were 112 people, 56 households, and 27 families living in the city. The population density was 311.1 inhabitants per square mile (120.1/km^{2}). There were 102 housing units at an average density of 283.3 per square mile (109.4/km^{2}). The racial makeup of the city was 93.75% White, 0.00% African American, 1.79% Native American, 3.57% Asian, 0.00% Pacific Islander, 0.00% from some other races and 0.89% from two or more races. Hispanic or Latino people of any race were 0.00% of the population.

There were 56 households 10.7% had children under the age of 18 living with them, 44.6% were married couples living together, 1.8% had a female householder with no husband present, 1.8% had a male householder with no wife present, and 51.8% were non-families. 46.4% of households were one person and 16.1% were one person aged 65 or older. The average household size was 1.84 and the average family size was 2.63.

The median age was 45.3 years. 11.6% of residents were under the age of 18; 10% were between the ages of 18 and 24; 27.8% were from 25 to 44; 32.1% were from 45 to 64; and 18.8% were 65 or older. The gender makeup of the city was 47.3% male and 52.7% female.

=== 2000 census ===
As of the 2000 census, there were 100 people, 51 households, and 23 families living in the city. The population density was 271.7 inhabitants per square mile (104.9/km^{2}). There were 117 housing units at an average density of 317.9 per square mile (122.7/km^{2}). The racial makeup of the city was 100.00% White, 0.00% African American, 0.00% Native American, 0.00% Asian, 0.00% Pacific Islander, 0.00% from some other races and 0.00% from two or more races. Hispanic or Latino people of any race were 1.00% of the population.

There were 51 households 21.6% had children under the age of 18 living with them, 31.4% were married couples living together, 11.8% had a female householder with no husband present, and 54.9% were non-families. 51.0% of households were one person and 11.8% were one person aged 65 or older. The average household size was 1.96 and the average family size was 3.00.

The age distribution was 26.0% under the age of 18, 4.0% from 18 to 24, 29.0% from 25 to 44, 26.0% from 45 to 64, and 15.0% 65 or older. The median age was 41 years. For every 100 females, there were 96.1 males. For every 100 females age 18 and over, there were 94.7 males.

The median household income was $31,563 and the median family income was $61,250. Males had a median income of $26,042 versus $21,094 for females. The per capita income for the city was $23,399. There were no families and 4.8% of the population living below the poverty line, including no under eighteens and 15.0% of those over 64.

== Points of interest ==
- Medora Musical
- Theodore Roosevelt National Park (South Unit)
- Maah Daah Hey Trail
- Chateau de Mores
- Theodore Roosevelt Presidential Library
- North Dakota Cowboy Hall of Fame
- Chimney Park
