= National Register of Historic Places listings in Traill County, North Dakota =

Location of Traill County in North Dakota

This is a list of the National Register of Historic Places listings in Traill County, North Dakota.

This is intended to be a complete list of the properties and districts on the National Register of Historic Places in Traill County, North Dakota, United States. The locations of National Register properties and districts for which the latitude and longitude coordinates are included below, may be seen in a map.

There are 21 properties and districts listed on the National Register in the county. Another 5 properties were once listed but have been removed.

Contents: Counties in North Dakota
Adams | Barnes | Benson | Billings | Bottineau | Bowman | Burke | Burleigh | Cass | Cavalier | Dickey | Divide | Dunn | Eddy | Emmons | Foster | Golden Valley | Grand Forks | Grant | Griggs | Hettinger | Kidder | LaMoure | Logan | McHenry | McIntosh | McKenzie | McLean | Mercer | Morton | Mountrail | Nelson | Oliver | Pembina | Pierce | Ramsey | Ransom | Renville | Richland | Rolette | Sargent | Sheridan | Sioux | Slope | Stark | Steele | Stutsman | Towner | Traill | Walsh | Ward | Wells | Williams

This National Park Service list is complete through NPS recent listings posted May 1, 2026.

== Current listings ==
	Name on the Register	Image	Date listed	Location	City or town	Description
1	Caledonia Bridge	Caledonia Bridge	February 27, 1997 (#97000188)	Unnamed county road across the Goose River, approximately 1 mile west of the Minnesota state line 47°27′26″N 96°53′03″W	Caledonia	
2	Delchar Theater	Delchar Theater	November 14, 1985 (#85002831)	20 W. Main St. 47°30′01″N 97°19′36″W	Mayville	
3	Carl Ben Eielson House	Carl Ben Eielson House	April 11, 1977 (#77001031)	405 8th St. 47°38′16″N 97°27′20″W	Hatton	
4	First National Bank	First National Bank	November 20, 1985 (#85002906)	22 W. Main St. 47°30′01″N 97°19′35″W	Mayville	
5	First State Bank of Buxton	First State Bank of Buxton	February 14, 1978 (#78001995)	423 Broadway St. 47°36′10″N 97°05′51″W	Buxton	
6	Goose River Bank	Goose River Bank	November 14, 1985 (#85002793)	45 Main St., E. 47°30′00″N 97°19′29″W	Mayville	
7	Grandins' Mayville Farm District		November 19, 1985 (#85002905)	2 Brunsdale, W. 47°30′12″N 97°20′02″W	Mayville	
8	Great Northern Railway Depot	Great Northern Railway Depot	October 5, 1977 (#77001033)	Front St. 47°30′00″N 97°19′26″W	Mayville	
9	Grinager Mercantile Building	Grinager Mercantile Building	November 20, 1985 (#85003354)	37 Main St., E. 47°30′01″N 97°19′31″W	Mayville	
10	Lucken Farm		May 14, 1986 (#86001049)	North of Portland; 47°31′33″N 97°22′09″W	Portland	
11	Lura Building	Lura Building	November 14, 1985 (#85002794)	29 W. Main St. 47°30′00″N 97°19′34″W	Mayville	
12	Mayville Historic District		November 19, 1985 (#85002904)	Roughly bounded by 3rd St., NE., 5th Ave., NE., Main St., E., and 3rd Ave., NE. and 2nd Ave., NE. 47°30′13″N 97°19′19″W	Mayville	
13	Mayville Public Library	Mayville Public Library	April 11, 1977 (#77001034)	Center Ave., N. 47°30′04″N 97°19′33″W	Mayville	
14	Andres O. Ness House		July 15, 1977 (#77001032)	Oak Ave. and 6th St. 47°38′14″N 97°27′44″W	Hatton	
15	Norway Bridge	Norway Bridge	February 27, 1997 (#97000192)	Unnamed county road across the Goose River, approximately 6 miles east and 3 miles south of Mayville; 47°27′26″N 97°11′55″W	Mayville	
16	Amos and Lillie Plummer House	Amos and Lillie Plummer House	January 4, 1996 (#95001488)	306 W. Caledonia Ave. 47°24′11″N 97°03′58″W	Hillsboro	
17	Col. William H. Robinson House	Col. William H. Robinson House	April 11, 1977 (#77001035)	127 4th Ave., NE. 47°30′11″N 97°19′20″W	Mayville	
18	Stomner House	Stomner House	October 11, 1979 (#79003728)	32 3rd St., NE. 47°30′07″N 97°19′22″W	Mayville	
19	Traill County Courthouse	Traill County Courthouse	November 25, 1980 (#80002928)	114 W. Caledonia Ave. 47°24′13″N 97°03′48″W	Hillsboro	
20	Union Block	Union Block	November 20, 1985 (#85003353)	21-25 Main St., W. 47°29′59″N 97°19′36″W	Mayville	
21	Viking Bridge	Viking Bridge	February 27, 1997 (#97000190)	Unnamed county road across the Goose River, approximately 1 mile northwest of Portland; 47°31′02″N 97°23′21″W	Portland	

== Former listings ==
	Name on the Register	Image	Date listed	Date removed	Location	City or town	Description
1	Blanchard Bridge		February 27, 1997 (#97000189)	March 25, 2009	Unnamed county road across the Elm River, approximately 0.5 miles (0.8 km) south of Blanchard, east of ND 18; 47°20′23″N 97°12′59″W	Blanchard	Was moved from location in August 2007.
2	Ellingson Farm District		September 12, 1985 (#85002343)	March 23, 2026	1 mile (1.6 km) north and 2.5 miles (4.0 km) west of Hillsboro; 47°27′39″N 97°07′31″W	Hillsboro	
3	Goose River Bridge		February 27, 1997 (#97000187)	March 25, 2009	Unnamed county road across the Goose River, approximately 6 miles (9.7 km) east and 1 mile (1.6 km) north of Hillsboro; 47°20′23″N 97°12′59″W	Hillsboro	
4	Porter Elliott Bridge		February 27, 1997 (#97000193)	March 25, 2009	Unnamed county road across the Sheyenne River, approximately 5 miles (8.0 km) east and 1 mile (1.6 km) north of Hillsboro; 47°26′10″N 96°56′32″W	Hillsboro	
5	Portland Park Bridge		February 27, 1997 (#97000191)	September 23, 2004	Across the S branch of the Goose River, unnamed co. rd., NE edge of Portland	Portland vicinity	
6	O.C. Sarles House		March 12, 1985 (#85000562)	March 25, 2009	2nd Avenue and 3rd Street, northeast corner 47°24′24″N 97°03′25″W	Hillsboro	

== See also ==
- List of National Historic Landmarks in North Dakota
- National Register of Historic Places listings in North Dakota
