= National Register of Historic Places listings in Barnes County, North Dakota =

Location of Barnes County in North Dakota

This is a list of the National Register of Historic Places listings in Barnes County, North Dakota.

This is intended to be a complete list of the properties and districts on the National Register of Historic Places in Barnes County, North Dakota, United States. The locations of National Register properties and districts for which the latitude and longitude coordinates are included below, may be seen in a map.

There are 13 properties and districts listed on the National Register in the county. Another property was once listed but has been removed.

Contents: Counties in North Dakota
Adams | Barnes | Benson | Billings | Bottineau | Bowman | Burke | Burleigh | Cass | Cavalier | Dickey | Divide | Dunn | Eddy | Emmons | Foster | Golden Valley | Grand Forks | Grant | Griggs | Hettinger | Kidder | LaMoure | Logan | McHenry | McIntosh | McKenzie | McLean | Mercer | Morton | Mountrail | Nelson | Oliver | Pembina | Pierce | Ramsey | Ransom | Renville | Richland | Rolette | Sargent | Sheridan | Sioux | Slope | Stark | Steele | Stutsman | Towner | Traill | Walsh | Ward | Wells | Williams

This National Park Service list is complete through NPS recent listings posted May 1, 2026.

== Current listings ==
	Name on the Register	Image	Date listed	Location	City or town	Description
1	Alderman School District #78		June 25, 2013 (#13000452)	11 miles (18 km) north of Valley City on County Route 21; 47°05′15″N 98°00′11″W	Valley City	
2	All Saints' Episcopal Church	All Saints' Episcopal Church	December 3, 1992 (#92001605)	516 N. Central Ave. 46°55′42″N 98°00′05″W	Valley City	
3	Amphitheater and Fieldstone WPA Features at Valley City Pioneer Park	Amphitheater and Fieldstone WPA Features at Valley City Pioneer Park	February 1, 2011 (#10001195)	Southwest of the intersection of 5th St. and 8th Ave. NW; 46°55′39″N 98°00′51″W	Valley City	Federal Relief Construction in North Dakota, 1931-1943, MPS; the features were built by the Works Progress Administration (WPA) in 1937 and include four fieldstone cairns at the entrance to Pioneer Park and "PIONEER" spelled out with stones
4	Barnes County Courthouse	Barnes County Courthouse	November 14, 1985 (#85002978)	491 Second Ave., NW. 46°55′38″N 98°00′18″W	Valley City	
5	Green Consolidated School	Green Consolidated School	November 1, 2011 (#11000768)	39 R St. SE. 46°50′57″N 98°07′19″W	Valley City	
6	Ladbury Church		October 4, 2005 (#05001140)	6 miles east of Dazey on ND 26, north 3 miles then west 0.25 miles 47°13′32″N 98°04′29″W	Dazey	
7	Midland Continental Railroad Depot	Midland Continental Railroad Depot	September 3, 2003 (#03000870)	401 Railway St. 47°10′14″N 98°27′33″W	Wimbledon	
8	Rudolf Hotel	Rudolf Hotel	February 10, 1983 (#83001926)	Central Ave. and 2nd St. 46°55′21″N 98°00′09″W	Valley City	
9	State Normal School at Valley City Historic District	State Normal School at Valley City Historic District	February 10, 1995 (#95000049)	Roughly bounded by College St., SE., 2nd Ave., SE., Viking Dr., and 2nd Ave., SW. 46°55′06″N 98°00′09″W	Valley City	
10	US Post Office-Valley City	US Post Office-Valley City	November 1, 1989 (#89001758)	149 NE. 3rd St. 46°55′32″N 98°00′05″W	Valley City	
11	Valley City Carnegie Library	Valley City Carnegie Library	October 18, 1979 (#79003724)	413 Central Ave. 46°55′35″N 98°00′11″W	Valley City	
12	Valley City Municipal Auditorium	Valley City Municipal Auditorium	January 4, 2008 (#07001341)	320 Central Ave., S. 46°55′15″N 98°00′11″W	Valley City	
13	West Park Bridge	West Park Bridge	February 27, 1997 (#97000169)	4th St., SW., across the Sheyenne River; 46°55′14″N 98°00′30″W	Valley City	Replaced in 2007

== Former listing ==
	Name on the Register	Image	Date listed	Date removed	Location	City or town	Description
1	Rainbow Arch Bridge	Rainbow Arch Bridge	February 27, 1997 (#97000170)	September 23, 2004	Main St., E, across the Sheyenne River	Valley City	Demolished in 2004. Replaced by duplicate the same year.

== See also ==
- List of National Historic Landmarks in North Dakota
- National Register of Historic Places listings in North Dakota
