= KMAV =

KMAV may refer to:

- KMAV-FM, a radio station (105.5 FM) licensed to Mayville, North Dakota, United States
- KMSR, a radio station (1520 AM) licensed to Northwood, North Dakota, United States, which used the call sign KMAV until September 2008
