= William C. Albrant =

American architect (1871–1905)

- Born: William Cullen Albrant; June 24, 1871; Winchester, Ontario, Canada
- Died: August 3, 1905 (aged 34); Grafton, North Dakota, U.S.
- Occupation: Architect

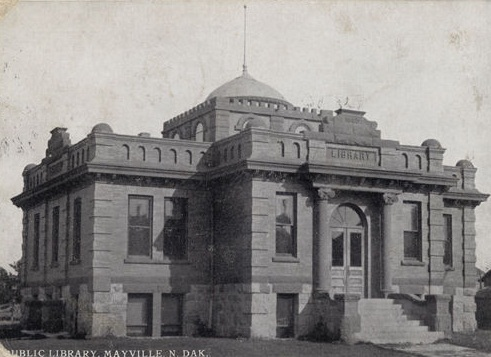
Mayville Public Library, Mayville, North Dakota. 1900.

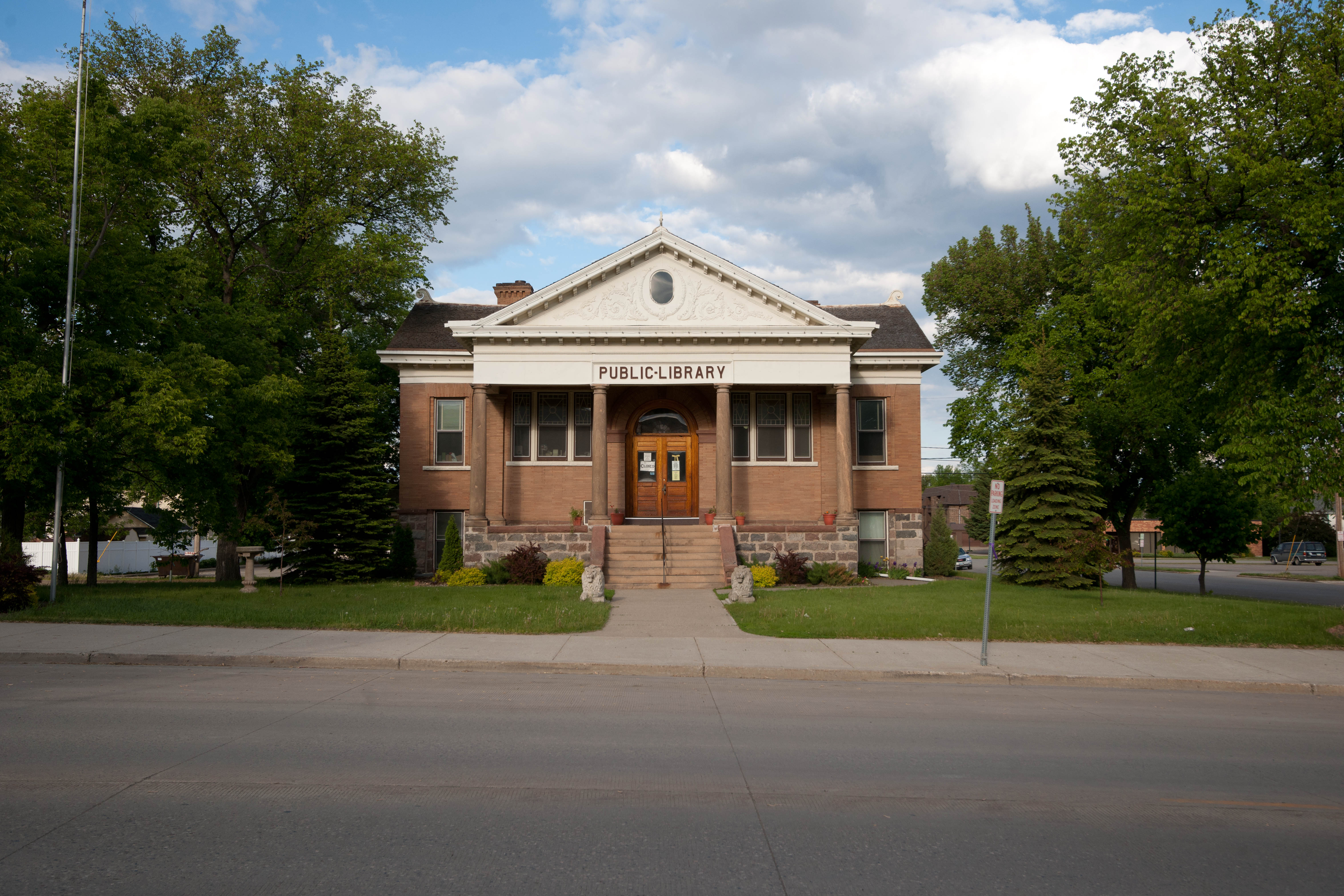
Valley City Public Library, Valley City, North Dakota. 1903.

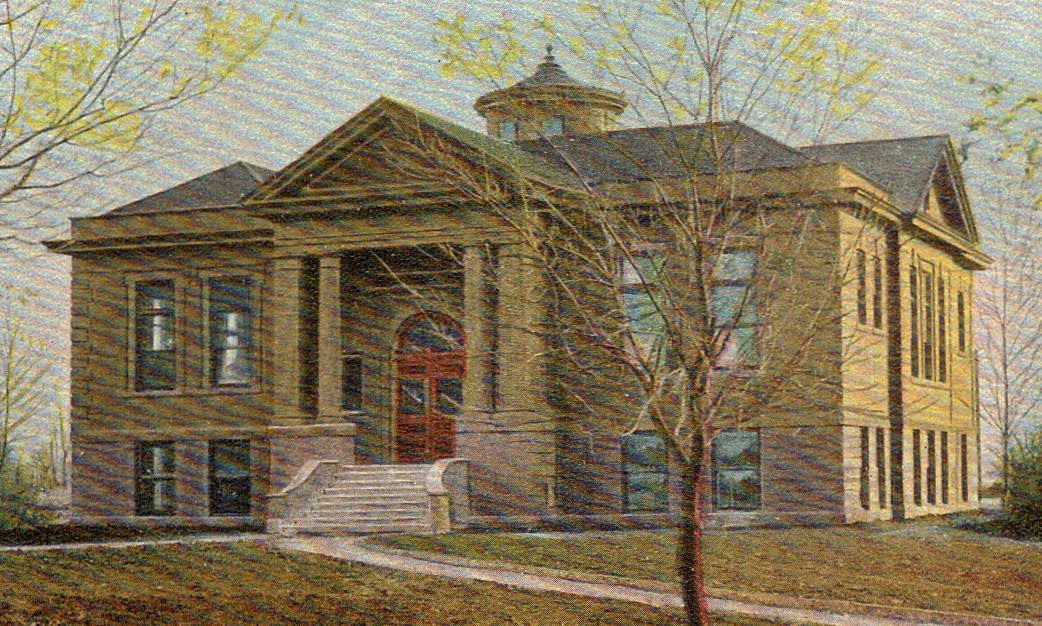
Carnegie Library, North Dakota Agricultural College, Fargo, North Dakota. 1904-05.

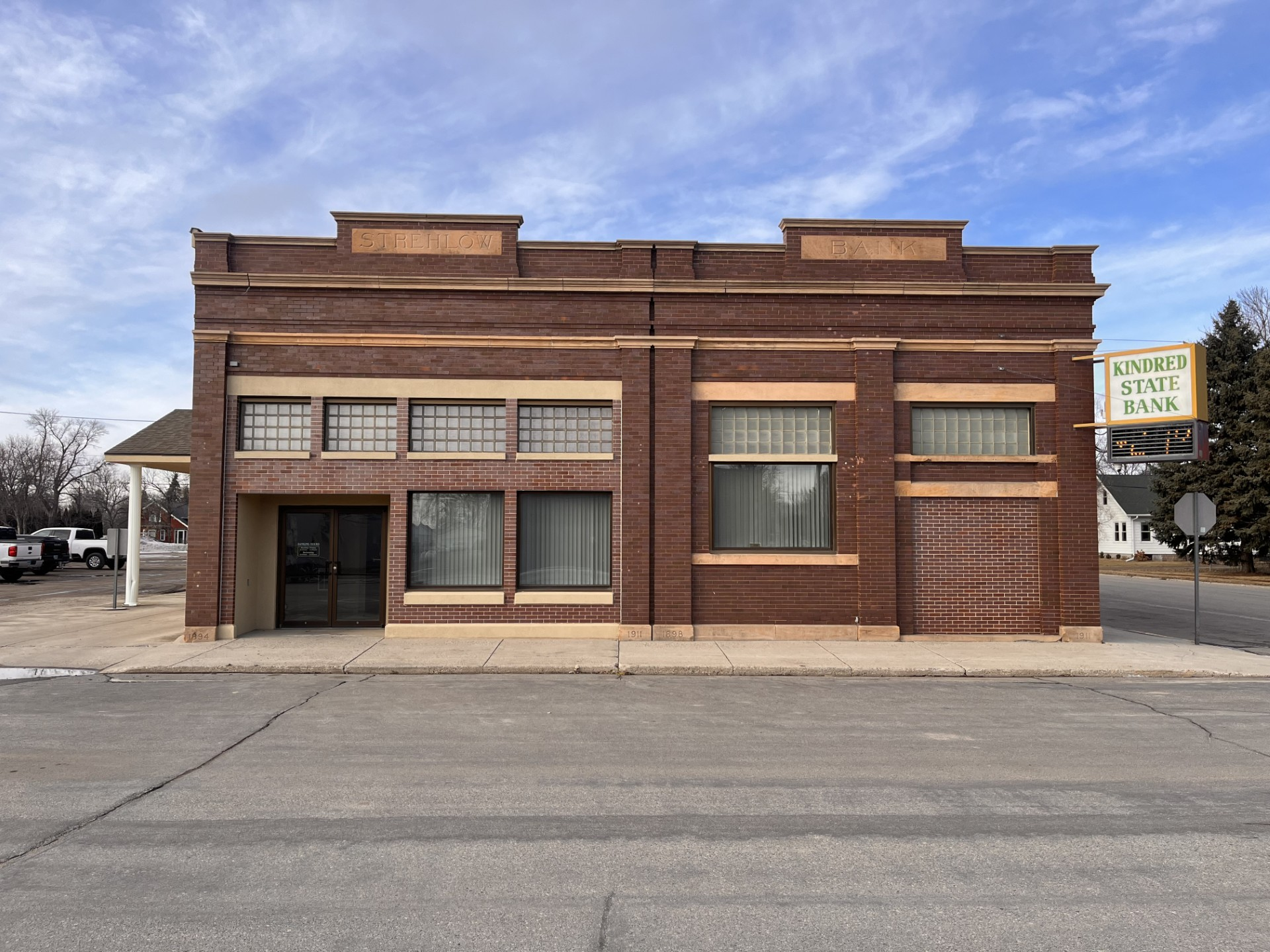
Kindred State Bank in Kindred, North Dakota in March of 2026.

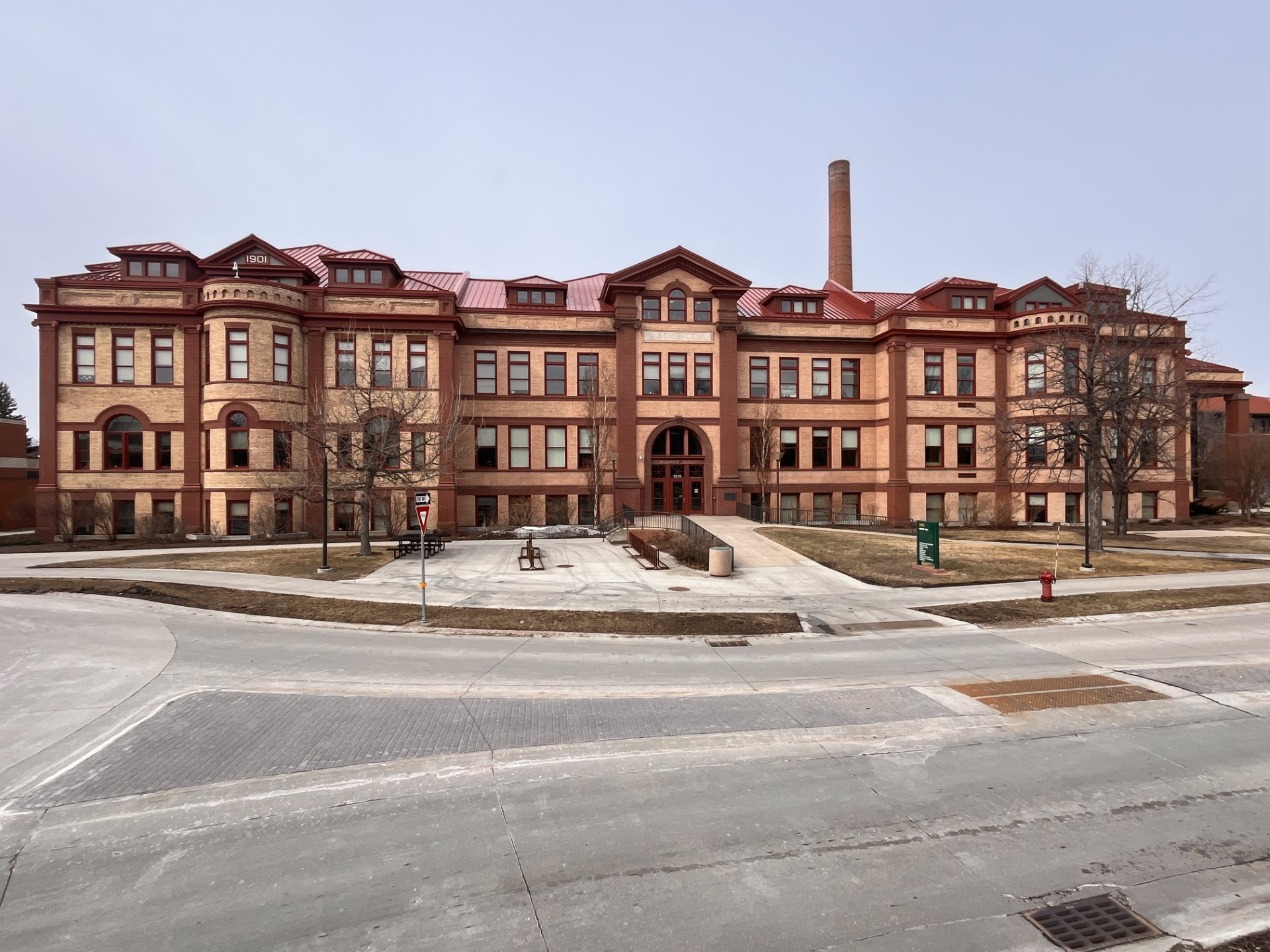
Minard Hall at North Dakota State University in March of 2026.

William Cullen Albrant (June 24, 1871 – August 3, 1905) was a Canadian-American architect. He practiced in Fargo, North Dakota.

== Early life ==
William Cullen Albrant was born in Winchester, Ontario on June 24, 1871. His parents were Mr. and Ms. S. S. Albrant. He had four brothers: Charles, Richard, and Robert.

In 1895, he moved west, planning to become a farmer. However, later that year he enrolled in the Division of Mechanical Arts of the North Dakota Agricultural College at Fargo, North Dakota.

== Career ==
By December 1897, Albrant had established his architectural office in Fargo. Albrant designed several major North Dakota buildings, including the state's first purpose-built public library, in Mayville. He also designed Y. M. C. A. buildings throughout the United States. Several of his buildings are listed on the U.S. National Register of Historic Places. He practiced until he died.

After his death, Albrant's firm became W. C. Albrant & Company, under the management of his brother-in-law. It became R. J. Haxby & Company in March 1906. Before he died, Albrant had arranged to form a partnership with Robert J. Haxby.

== Personal life ==
Albrant was married Miss Gillespie. He was a member of Ancient Order of United Workmen, the Epworth League, the Knights of Pythias, the Masons, and the Woodmen of the World. He belonged to the First Methodist Church of Fargo.

Albrant died on pneumonia in Grafton, North Dakota on August 3, 1905, at the age of 34. He was in Grafton for work and had been sick for several days. Albrant was buried in Riverside Cemetery in Fargo.

In November 1909, a bronze tablet was installed in his memory at the Y. M. C. A. Building in Fargo; Albrant designed the building in 1905.

== Selected works ==
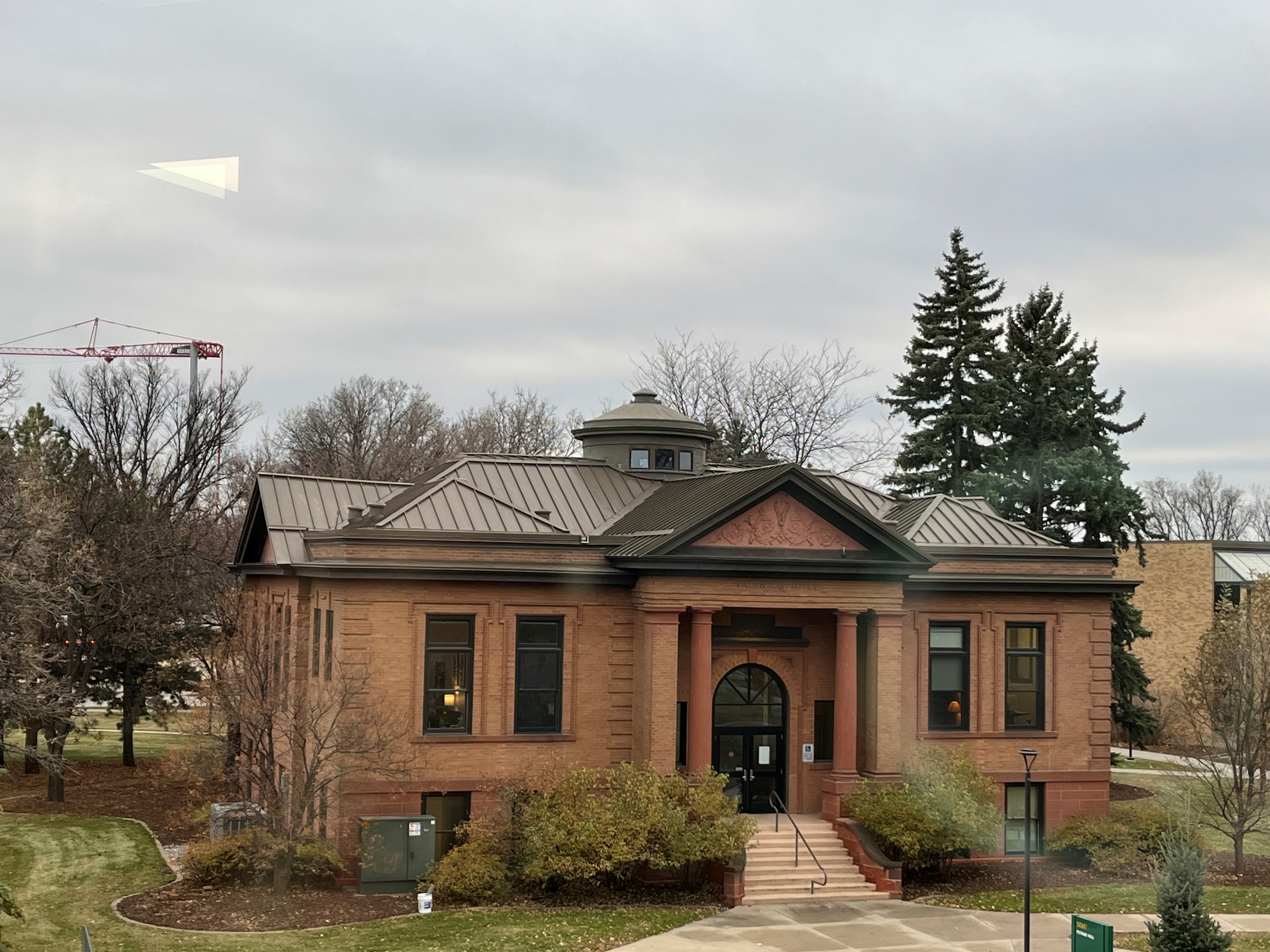
- Putnam Hall at NDSU facing the north in November of 2025.
  Kindred State Bank Building, 411 Elm St., Kindred, North Dakota (1900)
- Mayville Public Library, 52 Center Ave. N., Mayville, North Dakota (1900)
- Union Block and Lura Building, 21-29 W. Main St., Mayville, North Dakota (1900)
- Union Block, 3-9 N. Main St., Hillsboro, North Dakota (1900)
- Minard Hall, North Dakota Agricultural College, Fargo, North Dakota (1901)
- Jacobson Block (Opera House), 2 Main St. N., Minot, North Dakota (1902) - Burned in 1923.
- Robb-Lawrence Building, 650 Northern Pacific Ave., Fargo, North Dakota (1903) - Possibly inspired by nearby work of Cass Gilbert.
- Valley City Public Library, 413 Central Ave., Valley City, North Dakota (1903)
- First Baptist Church, 720 1st Ave. S., Fargo, North Dakota (1904) - Demolished.
- Milroy Public School, Milroy, Minnesota (1904–05) - Demolished.
- Putnam Hall (Carnegie Library ), North Dakota Agricultural College, Fargo, North Dakota (1904–05)
- Moose Jaw City Hall, Fairford St. W., Moose Jaw, Saskatchewan (1904–05) - Demolished.
- Phillips Academy, New Rockford, North Dakota (1904–05) - Demolished.
- Sykeston Public School, B St., Sykeston, North Dakota (1904) - Demolished.
- Old Main (Expansion), Mayville State Normal School, Mayville, North Dakota (1905)
- Y. M. C. A. Building, 630 1st Ave. N., Fargo, North Dakota (1905) - Demolished.
