= Lücken =

Lücken is a surname of German origin, originating as a patronymic from the personal name Lück. Notable people with the surname include:

- Iwar von Lücken (1874–1935), German poet
- J. Henry Lucken (1896–1984), American politician
- Robert Lücken (born 1985), Dutch rower

== See also ==
- Lucken Farm, a bonanza farm near Portland, North Dakota
- Lück
