= Ellingson =

Ellingson may refer to:

== Places ==
- Ellingson, South Dakota, a ghost town in the U.S.A.
- Ellingson Farm District, an historic farm in North Dakota, U.S.A.

== People ==
- Amy Ellingson (born 1964), American contemporary artist
- Court Ellingson, Canadian politician
- Evan Ellingson (1988–2023), American actor
- Greg Ellingson (born 1988), Canadian football wide receiver
- Lindsay Ellingson (born 1984), American fashion model
- Mark W. Ellingson (1905–1993), 5th president of the Rochester Institute of Technology
- Mary Ross Ellingson (1906–1993), classical archaeologist
- Robert L. Ellingson (born 1950), American lawyer and politician
- Caylor Ellingson (2004 or 2003–2022), American North Dakota teenager, victim of homicide
