= First National Bank (Mayville, North Dakota) =

- U.S. National Register of Historic Places
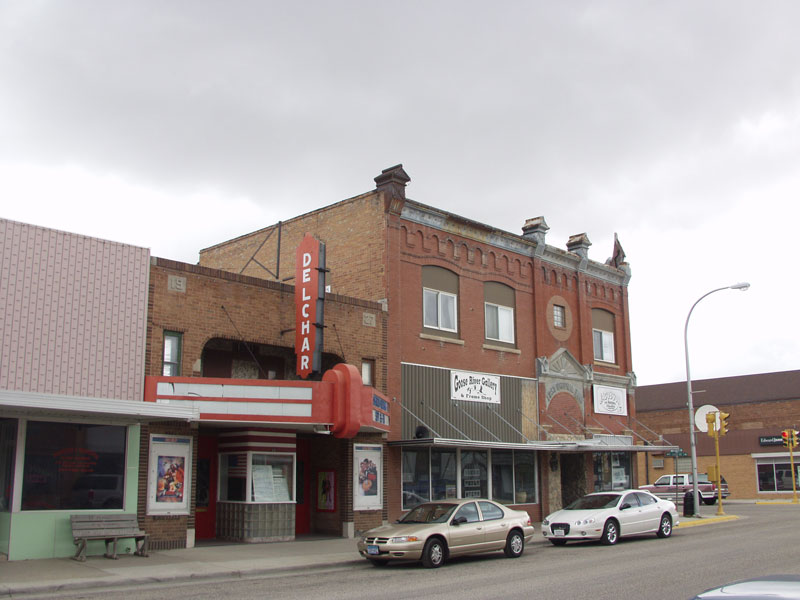
- Delchar Theater and the First National Bank

- Location within North Dakota Location within the United States
- Location: 22 W. Main St., Mayville, North Dakota
- Coordinates: 47°30′1″N 97°19′35″W
- Area: 0.1 acres (0.040 ha)
- Built: 1889
- Architectural style: Late Victorian
- NRHP reference No.: 85002906
- Added to NRHP: November 20, 1985

The First National Bank in Mayville, North Dakota was built in 1889. It was listed on the National Register of Historic Places in 19.

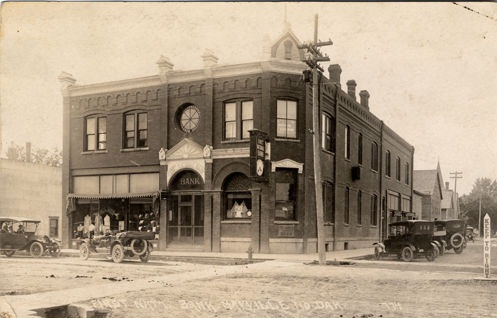
c. 1910

It is argued to be significant "because it was the first bank to be built in Mayville, North Dakota. It exhibits significant distinctive architectural style and is a landmark building in the commercial district. The bank represents an early banking endeavor in Mayville and is associated with several prominent Mayville entrepreneurs."
