= Lura Building =

- U.S. National Register of Historic Places
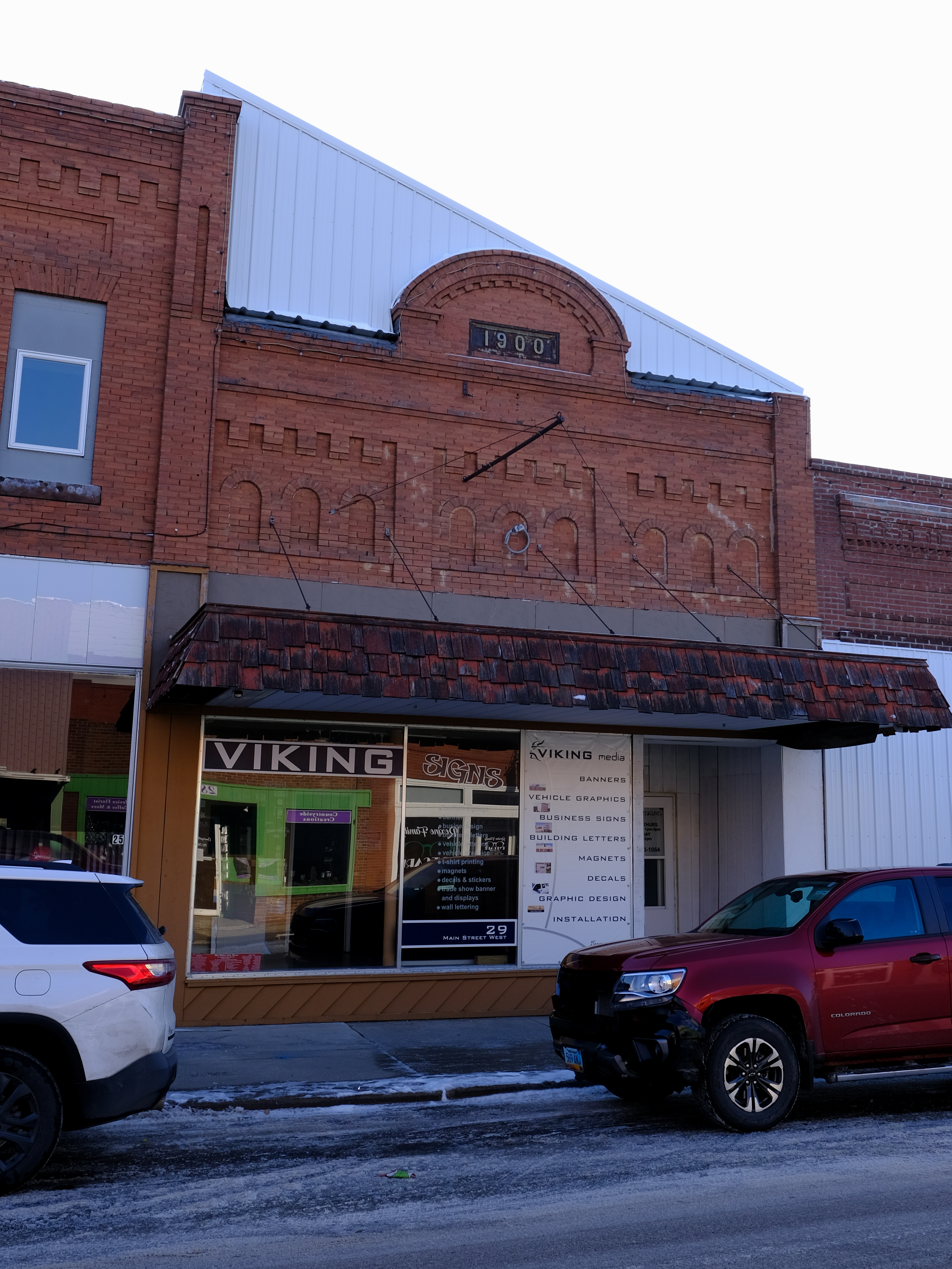
- Building in 2022

- Location within North Dakota Location within the United States
- Location: 29 W. Main St., Mayville, North Dakota
- Coordinates: 47°30′0″N 97°19′34″W
- Area: 0.1 acres (0.040 ha)
- Built: 1900
- Built by: William C. Albrant
- NRHP reference No.: 85002794
- Added to NRHP: November 14, 1985

The Lura Building on W. Main St. in Mayville, North Dakota was built in 1900. It has also been known as Peterson Furniture Store. It was listed on the National Register of Historic Places in 1985.
