= Mayville Public Library =

- U.S. National Register of Historic Places
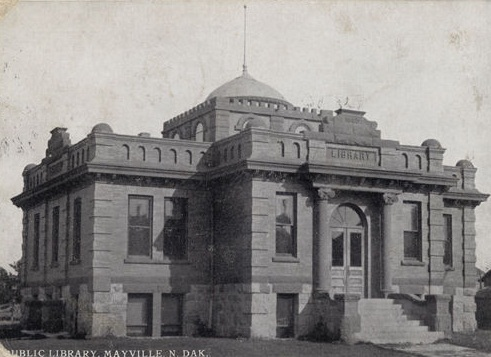
- Mayville Public Library, c. 1908

- Location within North Dakota Location within the United States
- Location: Center Ave., N., Mayville, North Dakota
- Coordinates: 47°30′4″N 97°19′33″W
- Area: less than one acre
- Built: 1900
- Architect: Albrant, William C.
- NRHP reference No.: 77001034
- Added to NRHP: April 11, 1977

The Mayville Public Library on Center Ave., N., Mayville, North Dakota was built in 1900. It was designed by Fargo architect William C. Albrant. It was listed on the National Register of Historic Places in 1977.

The library was funded by donations of J.L. Grandin and E.B. Grandin, who made money in bonanza farming.
