= Union Block (Mayville, North Dakota) =

- U.S. National Register of Historic Places
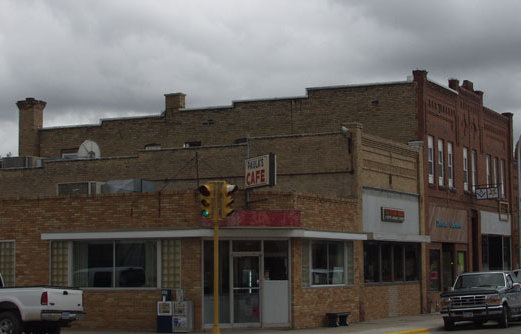
- Building in 2006 (rightmost storefront)

- Location within North Dakota Location within the United States
- Location: 21-25 Main St. W, Mayville, North Dakota
- Coordinates: 47°29′59″N 97°19′36″W
- Area: 0.1 acres (0.040 ha)
- Built: 1900
- Built by: Holberg, E.J.
- Architect: Albrant, William C.
- NRHP reference No.: 85003353
- Added to NRHP: November 20, 1985

The Union Block on Main St. W. in Mayville, North Dakota was built in 1900. It was listed on the National Register of Historic Places (NRHP) in 1985.

According to its NRHP nomination, the building "is significant for its distinctive commercial architecture which represents the work of an early North Dakota architect, William C. Albrant." And it also "possesses integrity of location, design, setting, and craftsmanship."
