= Stomner House =

Historic house in North Dakota, United States

- U.S. National Register of Historic Places
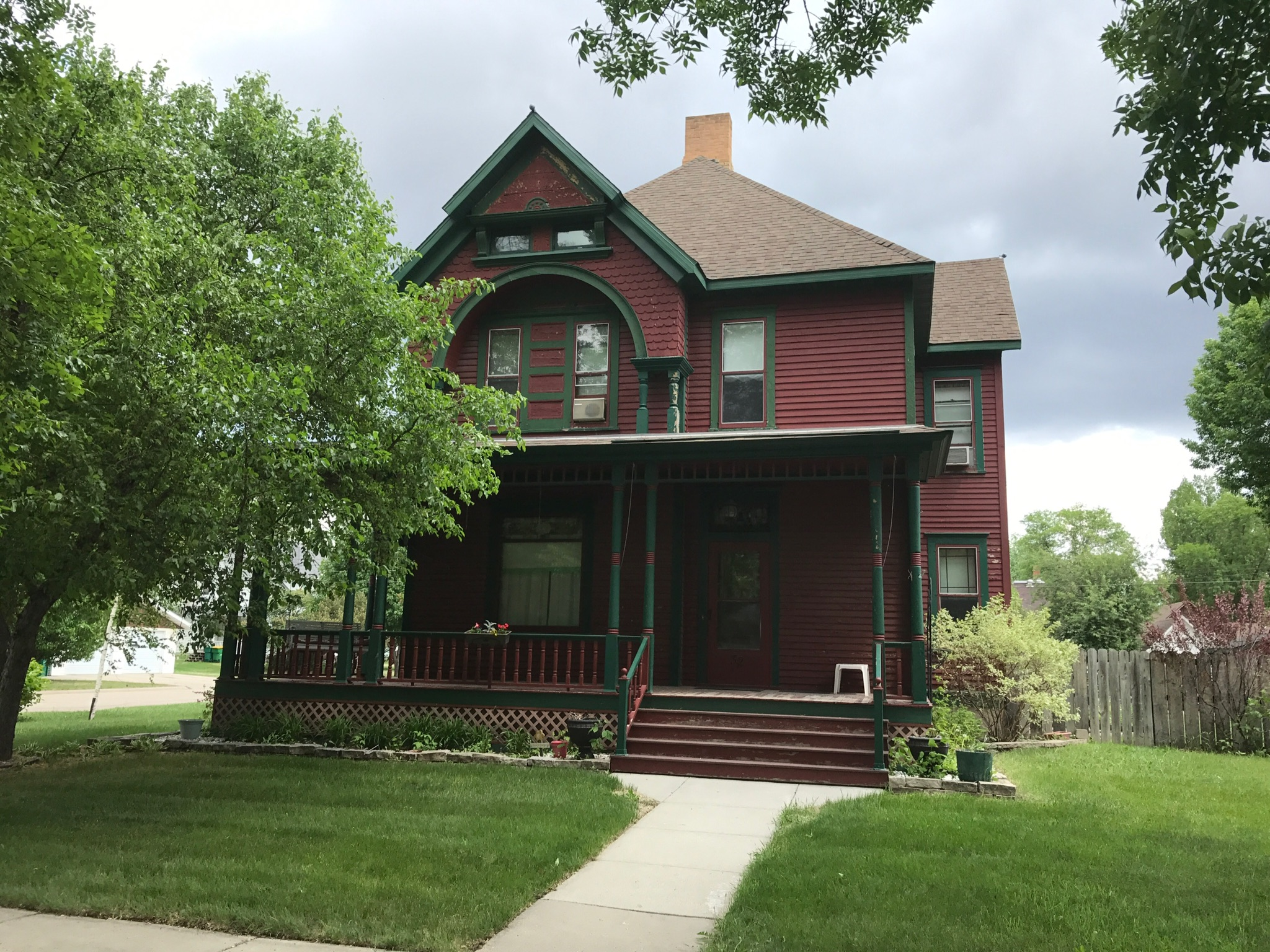

- Location within North Dakota Location within the United States
- Location: 32 3rd St., NE, Mayville, North Dakota
- Coordinates: 47°30′7″N 97°19′22″W
- Area: less than one acre
- Built: 1896
- Architectural style: Late Victorian
- NRHP reference No.: 79003728
- Added to NRHP: October 11, 1979

The Stomner House or Stanmer House on 3rd St., NE, in Mayville, North Dakota was built in 1896. It was listed on the National Register of Historic Places in 1979.

It's significant for its architecture and for its association with the Ellertson and Stomner families. It became a contributing property to the Mayville Historic District in 1985.
