= Grandins' Mayville Farm District =

Historic district in North Dakota, United States

- U.S. National Register of Historic Places
- U.S. Historic district
- Location: 2 Brunsdale W, Mayville, North Dakota
- Area: 23 acres (9.3 ha)
- Built: 1900
- Architectural style: Queen Anne
- NRHP reference No.: 85002905
- Added to NRHP: November 19, 1985

The Grandins' Mayville Farm District in Mayville, North Dakota is a farm that was developed before 1900 by the Grandin brothers. It includes Queen Anne style architecture in the United States. It was listed on the National Register of Historic Places in 1985. It then included eight contributing buildings and a contributing structure on its 23 acres (9.3 ha).
