= Mayville Municipal Airport =

- IATA: none; ICAO: none; FAA LID: D56

Summary
- Airport type: Public
- Owner: City of Mayville
- Serves: Mayville, North Dakota
- Elevation AMSL: 977 ft / 298 m
- Coordinates: 47°28′30″N 097°20′01″W

Map
- Location of airport in North Dakota D56 (the United States)

Runways
Direction	Length		Surface
Direction	ft	m	Surface
18/36	3,300	1,006	Asphalt

Statistics (2022)
- Aircraft operations (year ending 8/17/2022): 9,620
- Source: Federal Aviation Administration

Mayville Municipal Airport (FAA LID: D56) is a city-owned, public-use airport located one nautical mile (2 km) south of the central business district of Mayville, a city in Traill County, North Dakota, United States.

== Facilities and aircraft ==
Mayville Municipal Airport covers an area of 34 acres (14 ha) at an elevation of 977 feet (298 m) above mean sea level. It has one runway designated 18/36 with an asphalt surface measuring 3,300 by 60 feet (1,006 x 18 m).

For the 12-month period ending August 17, 2022, the airport had 9,620 aircraft operations, an average of 26 per day: 98% general aviation, 1% air taxi, and <1% military.

== See also ==
- List of airports in North Dakota
