= Mayville Historic District =

Historic district in North Dakota, United States

- U.S. National Register of Historic Places
- U.S. Historic district
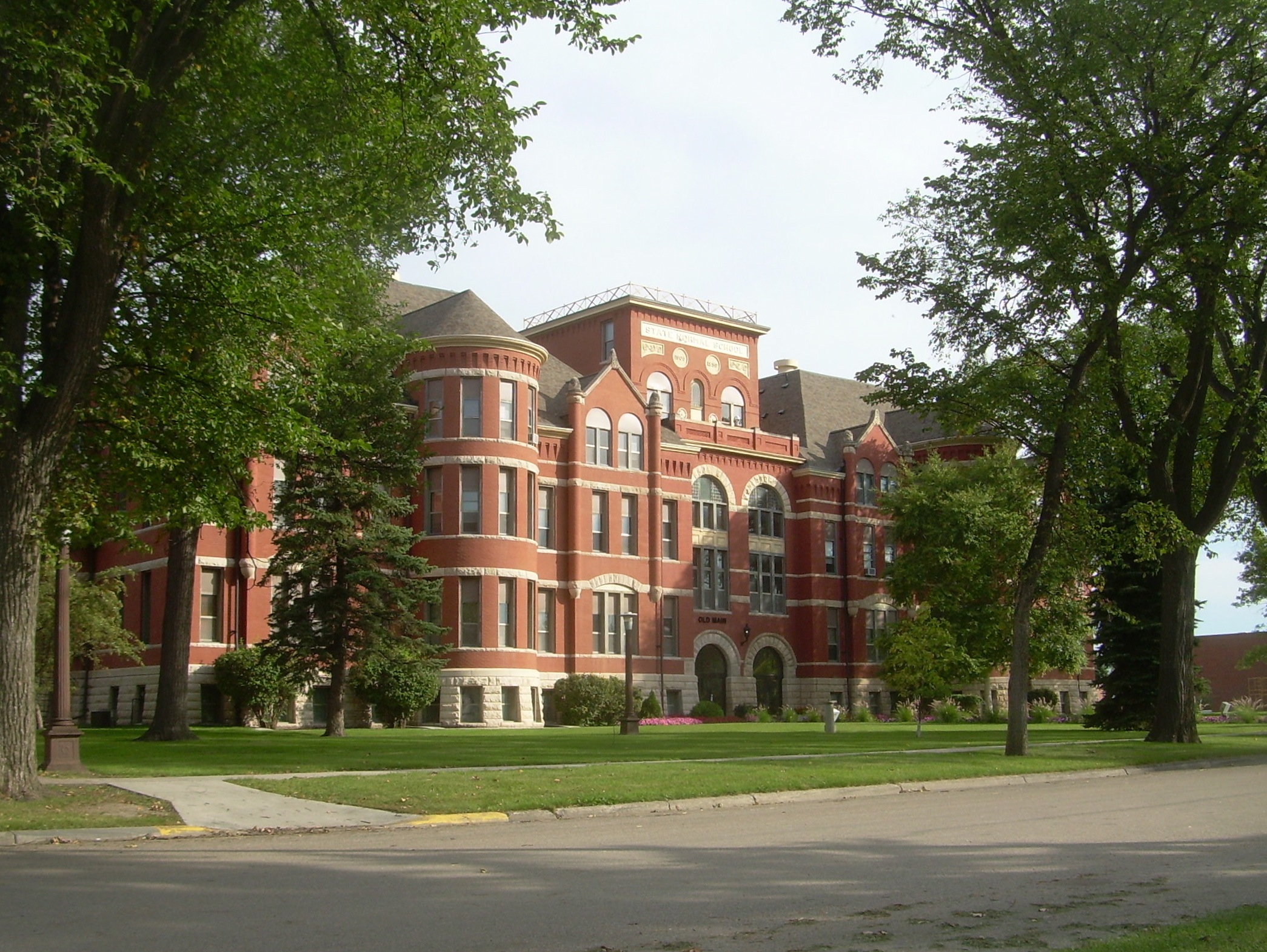
- Old Main, a contributing building at Mayville State University

- Location within North Dakota Location within the United States
- Location: Roughly bounded by Third St. NE, Fifth Ave. NE, Main St. E, and Third Ave. NE and Second Ave. NE, Mayville, North Dakota
- Coordinates: 47.5031°N 97.32303°W
- Area: 50.3 acres (20.4 ha)
- Built: 1889
- Architect: Multiple
- Architectural style: Late 19th and Early 20th Century American Movements, Late 19th and 20th Century Revivals, Late Victorian
- NRHP reference No.: 85002904
- Added to NRHP: November 19, 1985

The Mayville Historic District is a 50.3-acre (20.4 ha) historic district in Mayville, North Dakota. It includes works of significance during 1889–1930. It includes Late 19th and Early 20th Century American Movements, Late 19th and 20th Century Revivals, and Late Victorian architecture. It was listed on the National Register of Historic Places in 1985. The listing included 30 contributing buildings and two other contributing structures.

It includes both campus buildings of the Mayville State College and an adjacent residential district. Both the Robinson House and the Stomner House are individually listed contributing properties.
