= Rae Ann Kelsch =

American politician (1959–2018)

Member of the North Dakota House of Representatives from the 34th district
- In office 1992–2012

Personal details
- Born: November 16, 1959 Mayville, North Dakota, U.S.
- Died: October 30, 2018 (aged 58) New Orleans, Louisiana, U.S.
- Party: Republican
- Spouse: Thomas Kelsch
- Children: three
- Education: University of North Dakota

Rae Ann Gummer Kelsch (November 16, 1959 – October 30, 2018) was an American politician.

== Biography ==
Kelsch was born in Mayville, North Dakota. She received her bachelor's degree in business administration from the University of North Dakota. She contested her first state election legislative election in 1990, serving on the North Dakota House of Representatives starting in 1991 until losing reelection in 2012, when it was reported that she had not filed state income tax returns for seven years. Kelsch's husband Thomas said he was responsible for the couple's tax problems and the tax bill was eventually paid. After leaving the state legislature, Kelsch worked for the National Federation of Independent Business.

Kelsch died, aged 58, in New Orleans of a bacterial infection on October 30, 2018, after consuming raw oysters.
