= Andres O. Ness House =

Historic house in North Dakota, United States

- U.S. National Register of Historic Places
- Location within North Dakota Location within the United States
- Location: Oak Ave. and 6th St., Hatton, North Dakota
- Coordinates: 47°38′14″N 97°27′44″W
- Area: less than one acre
- Built: c.1908
- Built by: Ness, Andres O.; Coltom, Ed
- NRHP reference No.: 77001032
- Added to NRHP: July 15, 1977

The Andres O. Ness House at Oak Ave. and 6th St. in Hatton, North Dakota was listed on the National Register of Historic Places in 1977. The listing included three contributing buildings: the house, a carriage house, and a privy.

It was the former home of Andres O. Ness (1850–1913), who was born in Nes, Hallingdal, Norway. In 1884 he married Ragnhild Enrud (1852-1921) and in 1900 purchased a lot in the townsite of Hatton. Their residence was built circa 1908.

The house is now known as the Hatton Eielson Museum. Hatton Eielson Museum and Historical Association was formed in 1973. Exhibits include memorabilia of Colonel Carl Benjamin Eielson (1897-1929). The museum also features displays on members of the Eielson family, the city of Hatton and surrounding area.
