= Aagot Raaen =

American author and educator

Aagot Raaen (December 3, 1873 – January 7, 1957) was an American author and educator.

== Early life and education ==
Raaen was one of five children born to Thomas T. Raaen (1827–1903) and Ragnhild (Rodningen) Raaen (1839–1923), who were immigrants from Norway. In June 1874, the family had moved to Dakota Territory settling near Hatton, North Dakota. Thomas Raaen homesteaded 160 acres of land in Newburgh Township (now in Steele County, North Dakota). Aagot Raaen put herself through school and college. In 1903, Raaen graduated from the Mayville State Normal School, now Mayville State University. In 1913, she graduated from the University of Minnesota. She later did graduate work at universities in Berlin and Hawaii.

== Career ==
Raaen taught at rural schools in North Dakota as well as at Oak Grove Lutheran School in Fargo, North Dakota. From 1917 to 1922, she was the Superintendent of Schools in Steele County, North Dakota. In 1922, she began teaching at a number of post-secondary institutions in Hawaii.

Raaen wrote several historical articles and books. Her 1950 autobiographical work Grass of the Earth: Immigrant Life in the Dakota country followed her family's homesteading on the prairie. She also wrote many short essays and biographies of pioneer families.

== Selected works ==
- Grass of the Earth: Immigrant Life in the Dakota Country (Ayer Publishing, 1950) ISBN 978-0873512954
- Measure of My Days (North Dakota Institute for Regional Studies, 1953) ISBN 0-911042-00-8
- Hamarsbön-Raaen Genealogy (Chicago: E. Felland, 1957)

== Papers ==
Raaen's papers are contained at the North Dakota State University Institute for Regional Studies:

- Aagot Raaen Photograph Collection
- Aagot Raaen Papers, 1915–1953
- Institute for Regional Studies records, 1950–present
