= Col. William H. Robinson House =

Historic house in North Dakota, United States

- U.S. National Register of Historic Places
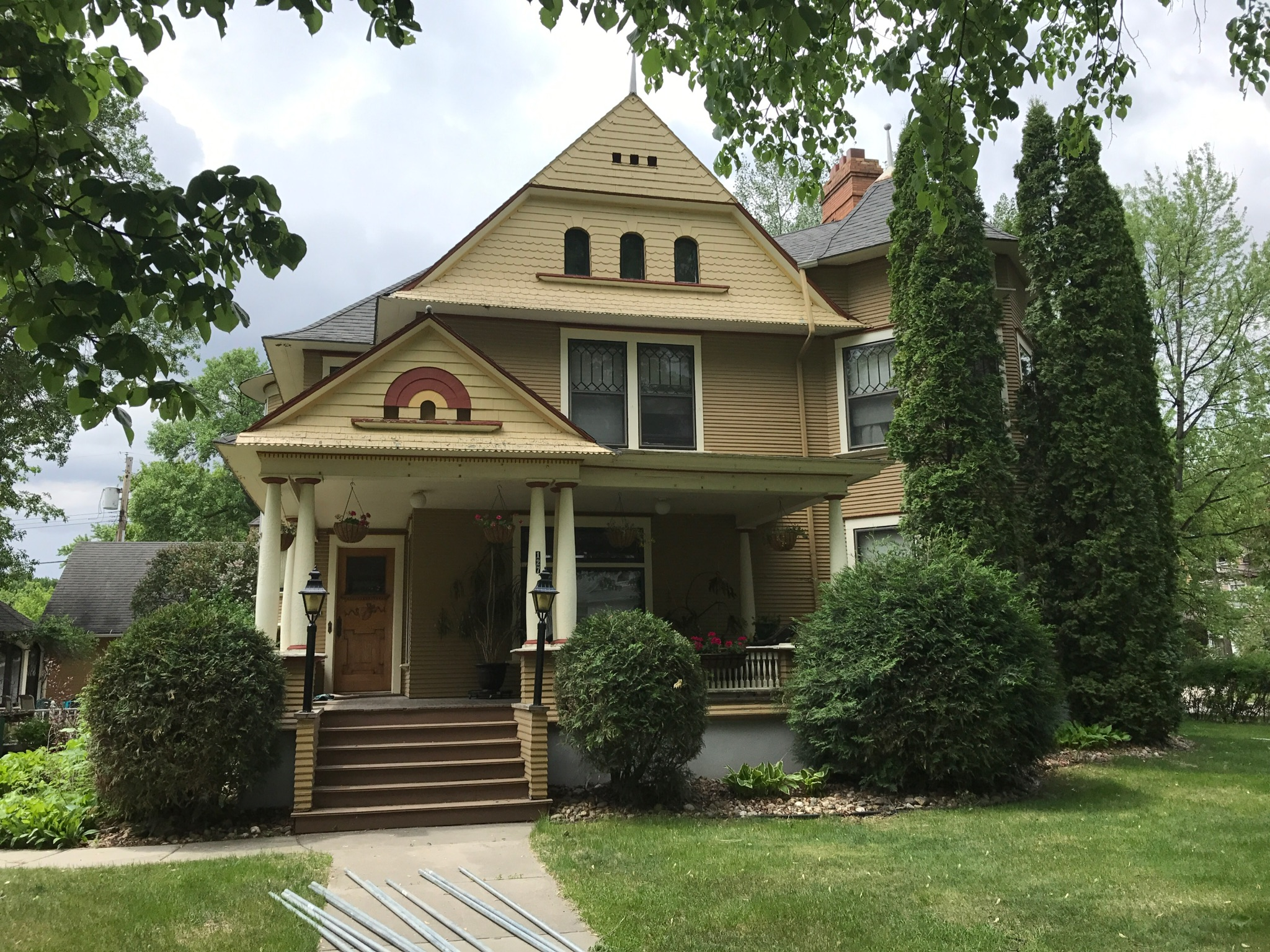

- Location within North Dakota Location within the United States
- Location: 127 4th Ave., NE, Mayville, North Dakota
- Coordinates: 47°30′11″N 97°19′20″W
- Area: less than one acre
- Built: 1900
- Architectural style: Late Victorian
- NRHP reference No.: 77001035
- Added to NRHP: April 11, 1977

The Col. William H. Robinson House on 4th Ave., NE, in Mayville, North Dakota was built in 1900. It includes Late Victorian architecture and has also been known as the Inga B. Grinager House. It was listed on the National Register of Historic Places in 1977.

It has an octagonal tower. It became a contributing property to the Mayville Historic District in 1985.

== See also ==
- Grinager Mercantile Building, also NRHP-listed in Mayville
