= Grinager Mercantile Building =

- U.S. National Register of Historic Places
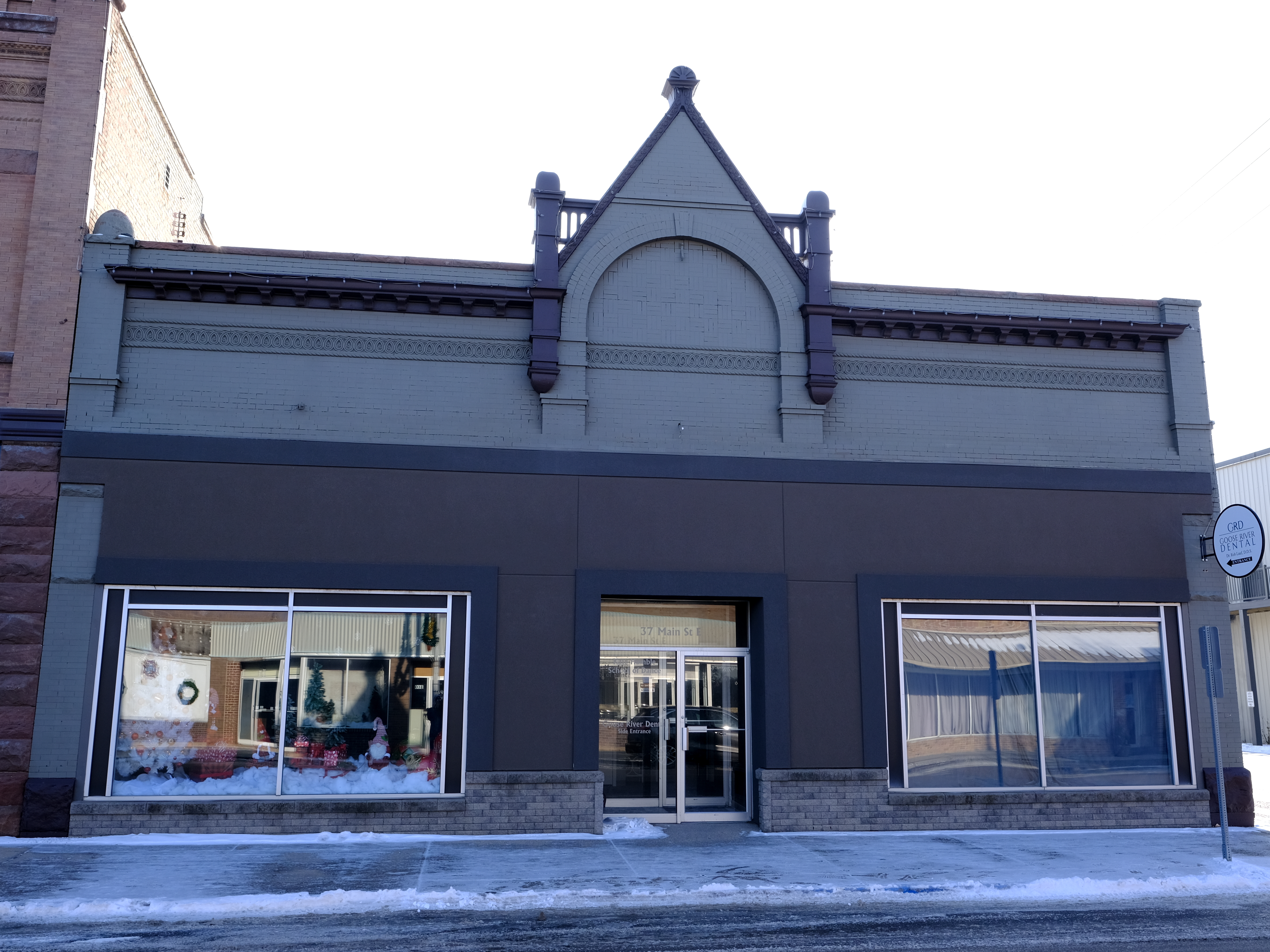

- Location within North Dakota Location within the United States
- Location: 37 Main St. E, Mayville, North Dakota
- Coordinates: 47°30′1″N 97°19′31″W
- Area: 0.2 acres (0.081 ha)
- Built: 1899
- Built by: Coockin, Eberhardt
- Architectural style: Gothic
- NRHP reference No.: 85003354
- Added to NRHP: November 20, 1985

The Grinager Mercantile Building on Main St. E. in Mayville, North Dakota was built in 1899. It was a department store. It was listed on the National Register of Historic Places in 1985.

== See also ==
- Inga B. Grinager House, also NRHP-listed in Mayville
