= Delchar Theater =

- U.S. National Register of Historic Places
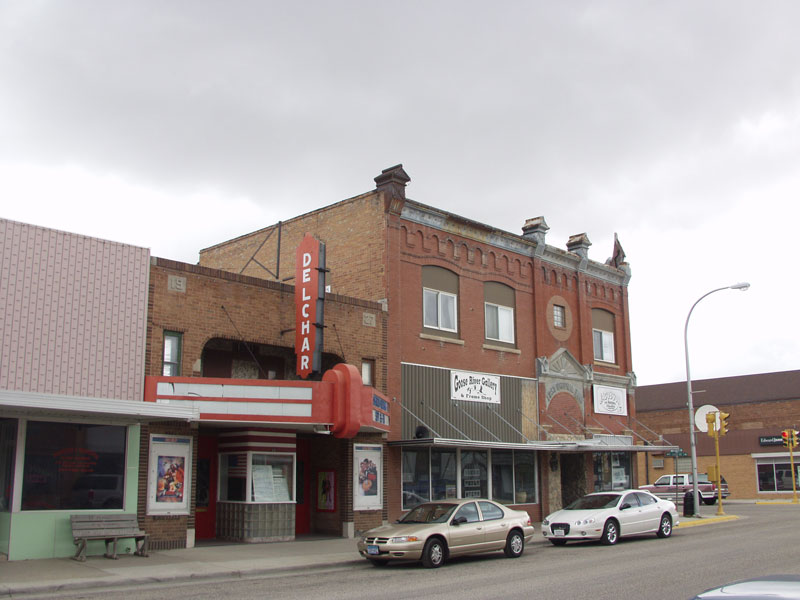

- Location within North Dakota Location within the United States
- Location: 20 W. Main St., Mayville, North Dakota
- Coordinates: 47°30′1″N 97°19′36″W
- Area: 0.7 acres (0.28 ha)
- Built: 1927
- Built by: Holmquist, Olaf; Dahl, Peter
- Architectural style: Art Deco
- NRHP reference No.: 85002831
- Added to NRHP: November 14, 1985

The Delchar Theater on W. Main St. in Mayville, North Dakota, United States, was built in 1927. It was listed on the National Register of Historic Places (NRHP) in 1985.

According to its NRHP nomination, it "is significant to the City of Mayville for its role as a major entertainment site."
