= Buxton, North Dakota =

- City
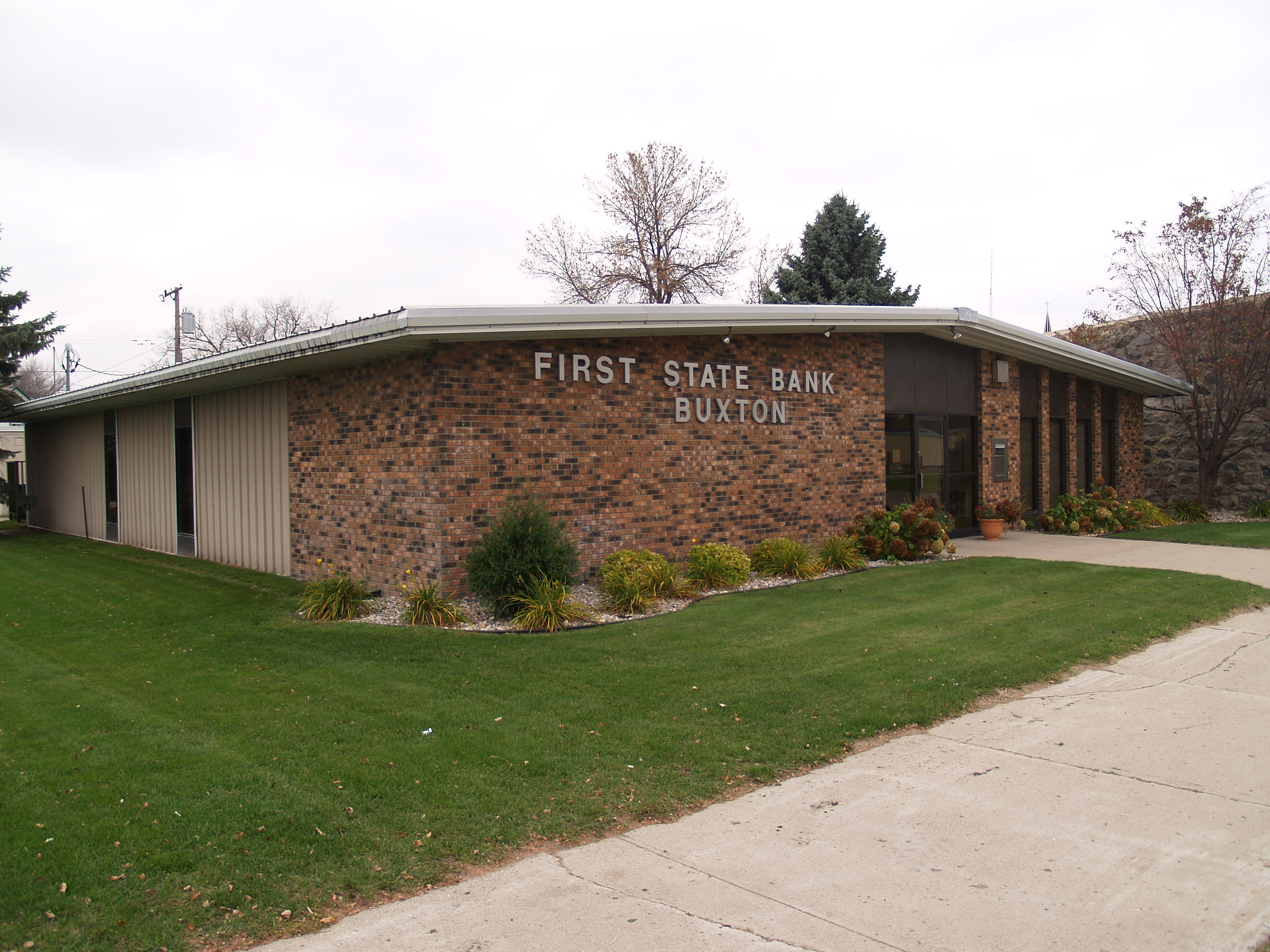
- The First State Bank of Buxton

- Location of Buxton, North Dakota
- Coordinates: 47°36′07″N 97°05′51″W
- Country: United States
- State: North Dakota
- County: Traill
- Founded: 1880
- Incorporated (village): 1922
- Incorporated (city): 1967

Area
  - Total: 0.334 sq mi (0.865 km^{2})
  - Land: 0.334 sq mi (0.865 km^{2})
  - Water: 0 sq mi (0.000 km^{2})
- Elevation: 932 ft (284 m)

Population (2020)
  - Total: 348
  - Estimate (2023): 349
  - Density: 1,042.4/sq mi (402.47/km^{2})
- Time zone: UTC–6 (Central (CST))
  - Summer (DST): UTC–5 (CDT)
- ZIP Code: 58218
- Area code: 701
- FIPS code: 38-11340
- GNIS feature ID: 1035949
- Website: buxtonnd.com

Buxton is a city in Traill County, North Dakota, United States. The population was 348 at the 2020 census. Buxton was founded in 1880.

== History ==
Buxton was founded in 1880 in Buxton Township as a townsite along the Great Northern Railroad in 1880. The post office began operating in November of that year. It was incorporated as a village in 1922. It became a city in 1967, after the North Dakota Legislature enacted legislation that eliminated all existing incorporation titles for towns and villages in the state.

The town was named after Thomas J. Buxton, at the time the city treasurer of Minneapolis, Minnesota. Buxton was a close friend and business associate of the town's founder, Budd Reeve.

== Geography ==
According to the United States Census Bureau, the city has an area of 0.334 square miles (0.87 km^{2}), all land.

== Demographics ==
Historical population
Census	Pop.	Note	%±
1930	410		—
1940	404		−1.5%
1950	387		−4.2%
1960	321		−17.1%
1970	235		−26.8%
1980	336		43.0%
1990	343		2.1%
2000	350		2.0%
2010	323		−7.7%
2020	348		7.7%
2023 (est.)	349		0.3%
U.S. Decennial Census; 2020 Census

=== 2020 census ===
Buxton, North Dakota – Racial Composition (NH = Non-Hispanic) Note: the US Census treats Hispanic/Latino as an ethnic category. This table excludes Latinos from the racial categories and assigns them to a separate category. Hispanics/Latinos can be of any race.
Race	Number	Percentage
White (NH)	329	94.5%
Black or African American (NH)	2	0.6%
Native American or Alaska Native (NH)	4	1.1%
Asian (NH)	0	0.0%
Pacific Islander (NH)	0	0.0%
Some Other Race (NH)	0	0.0%
Mixed/Multi-Racial (NH)	9	2.6%
Hispanic or Latino	4	1.1%
Total	348	100.0%

As of the 2020 census, there were 348 people, 132 households, and 97 families residing in the city. The population density was 1,735.0 inhabitants per square mile (669.9/km^{2}). There were 143 housing units at an average density of 713.0 per square mile (275.3/km^{2}). The racial makeup of the city was 94.8% White, 0.6% African American, 1.1% Native American, 0.0% Asian, 0.0% Pacific Islander, 0.6% from some other races and 2.9% from two or more races. Hispanic or Latino of any race were 1.1% of the population. 22.0% of residents were under the age of 18, 7.8% were under 5 years of age, and 14.3% were 65 and older.

=== 2010 census ===
As of the 2010 census, there were 323 people, 136 households, and 91 families residing in the city. The population density was 1,615.0 inhabitants per square mile (623.6/km^{2}). There were 144 housing units at an average density of 720.0 per square mile (278.0/km^{2}). The racial makeup of the city was 99.4% White, 0.3% African American, and 0.3% Native American. Hispanic or Latino of any race were 0.9% of the population.

There were 136 households, of which 30.9% had children under the age of 18 living with them, 59.6% were married couples living together, 2.9% had a female householder with no husband present, 4.4% had a male householder with no wife present, and 33.1% were non-families. 28.7% of all households were made up of individuals, and 13.9% had someone living alone who was 65 years of age or older. The average household size was 2.38 and the average family size was 2.97.

The median age in the city was 39.4 years. 23.2% of residents were under the age of 18; 7.7% were between the ages of 18 and 24; 28.9% were from 25 to 44; 26.7% were from 45 to 64; and 13.6% were 65 years of age or older. The gender makeup of the city was 51.4% male and 48.6% female.

=== 2000 census ===
As of the 2000 census, there were 350 people, 133 households, and 96 families residing in the city. The population density was 1,735.1 inhabitants per square mile (669.9/km^{2}). There were 141 housing units at an average density of 699.0 per square mile (269.9/km^{2}). The racial makeup of the city was 98.00% White, 0.29% Asian, 1.43% from other races, and 0.29% from two or more races. Hispanic or Latino of any race were 1.71% of the population.

There were 133 households, out of which 39.1% had children under the age of 18 living with them, 65.4% were married couples living together, 5.3% had a female householder with no husband present, and 27.8% were non-families. 26.3% of all households were made up of individuals, and 12.0% had someone living alone who was 65 years of age or older. The average household size was 2.63 and the average family size was 3.22.

In the city, the population was spread out, with 32.0% under the age of 18, 5.1% from 18 to 24, 29.7% from 25 to 44, 21.4% from 45 to 64, and 11.7% who were 65 years of age or older. The median age was 34 years. For every 100 females, there were 92.3 males. For every 100 females age 18 and over, there were 91.9 males.

The median income for a household in the city was $40,694, and the median income for a family was $48,333. Males had a median income of $26,875 versus $22,143 for females. The per capita income for the city was $16,232. None of the families and 2.9% of the population were living below the poverty line, including no under eighteens and 9.8% of those over 64.

== Transportation ==
Amtrak’s Empire Builder, which operates between Seattle/Portland and Chicago, passes through the town on BNSF tracks but does not stop. The nearest station is in Grand Forks, 25 miles (40 km) to the north.

== Education ==
Buxton is in Central Valley Public School District 3.

== Notable people ==
- Asle J. Gronna, U.S. Senator (1911–1921)
- Ragnvald Nestos, Governor (1921–1925)
- Kemper Nomland, architect
- Mancur Olson, economist
- Arthur G. Sorlie, Governor (1925–1928)
- Brent Vigen, head football coach at Montana State University (2021– )
