= Amphitheater and Fieldstone WPA Features at Valley City Pioneer Park =

- U.S. National Register of Historic Places
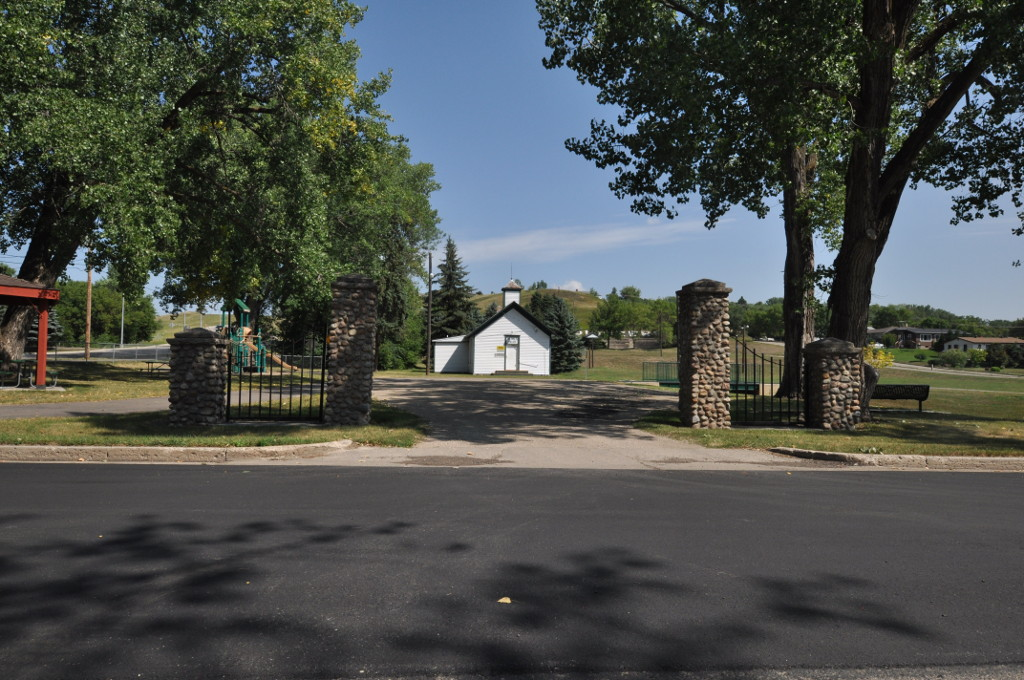

- Location within North Dakota Location within the United States
- Location: SW of the intersection between 5th St and 8th Ave NW, Valley City, North Dakota
- Coordinates: 46°55′39″N 98°00′51″W
- MPS: Federal Relief Construction in North Dakota, 1931-1943, MPS
- NRHP reference No.: 10001195
- Added to NRHP: February 1, 2011

The Amphitheater and Fieldstone WPA Features at Valley City Pioneer Park in Barnes County, North Dakota is listed on the National Register of Historic Places.

The features were built by the Works Progress Administration (WPA) in 1937 and include four fieldstone cairns at the entrance to Pioneer Park and "PIONEER" spelled out with stones
