= Carl Ben Eielson House =

Historic house in North Dakota, United States

- U.S. National Register of Historic Places
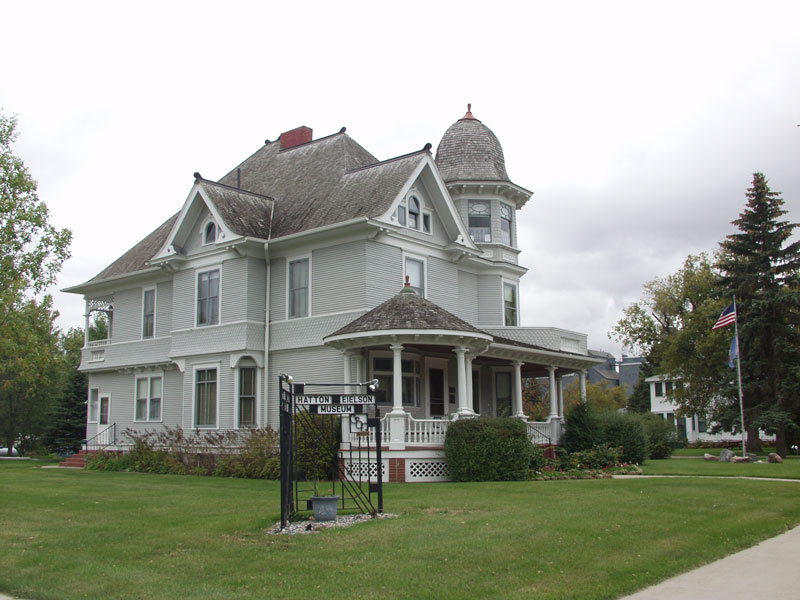

- Location within North Dakota Location within the United States
- Location: 405 8th St., Hatton, North Dakota
- Coordinates: 47°38′16″N 97°27′20″W
- Area: less than one acre
- Built: 1900
- Built by: Nelson, T. E.
- Architectural style: Queen Anne
- NRHP reference No.: 77001031
- Added to NRHP: April 11, 1977

The Carl Ben Eielson House, a Queen Anne style house on 8th St. in Hatton, North Dakota, was built in 1900. It has also been known as Osking House. It was listed on the National Register of Historic Places in 1977.

It is an "outstanding" Queen Anne house but is most significant for its association with aviator Colonel Carl Benjamin Eielson (1897–1929).
