= Green Consolidated School =

- U.S. National Register of Historic Places
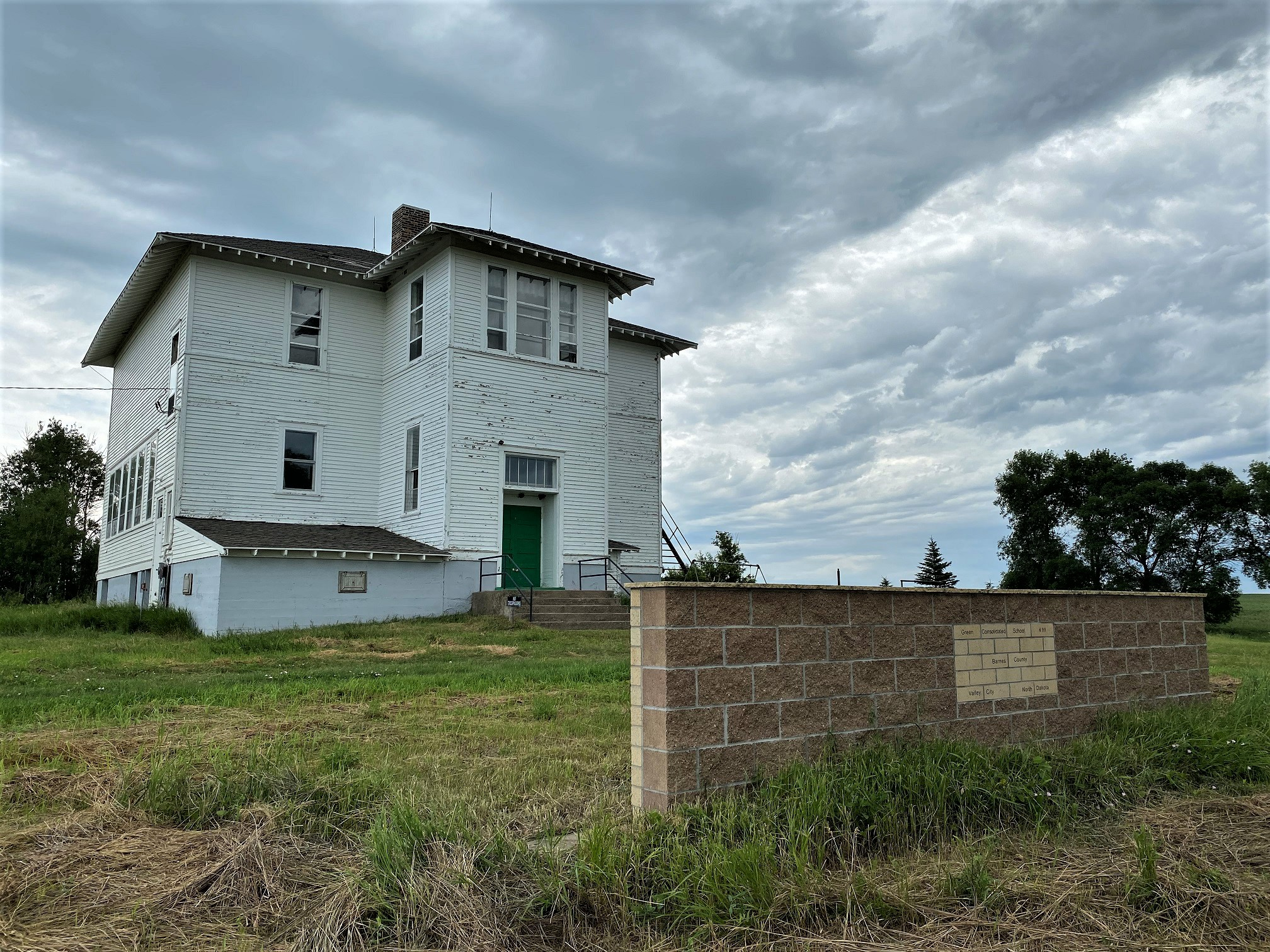

- Location within North Dakota Location within the United States
- Location: 39 R St. SE.
- Nearest city: Valley City, North Dakota
- Coordinates: 46°50′57″N 98°07′20″W
- NRHP reference No.: 11000768
- Added to NRHP: November 1, 2011

Green Consolidated School near Valley City, North Dakota, United States, "is the best preserved open country consolidated school in North Dakota." It served during 1916 to 1974.

It was listed on the National Register of Historic Places in 2011.
