= Valley City Barnes County Public Library =

- Valley City Carnegie Library
- U.S. National Register of Historic Places
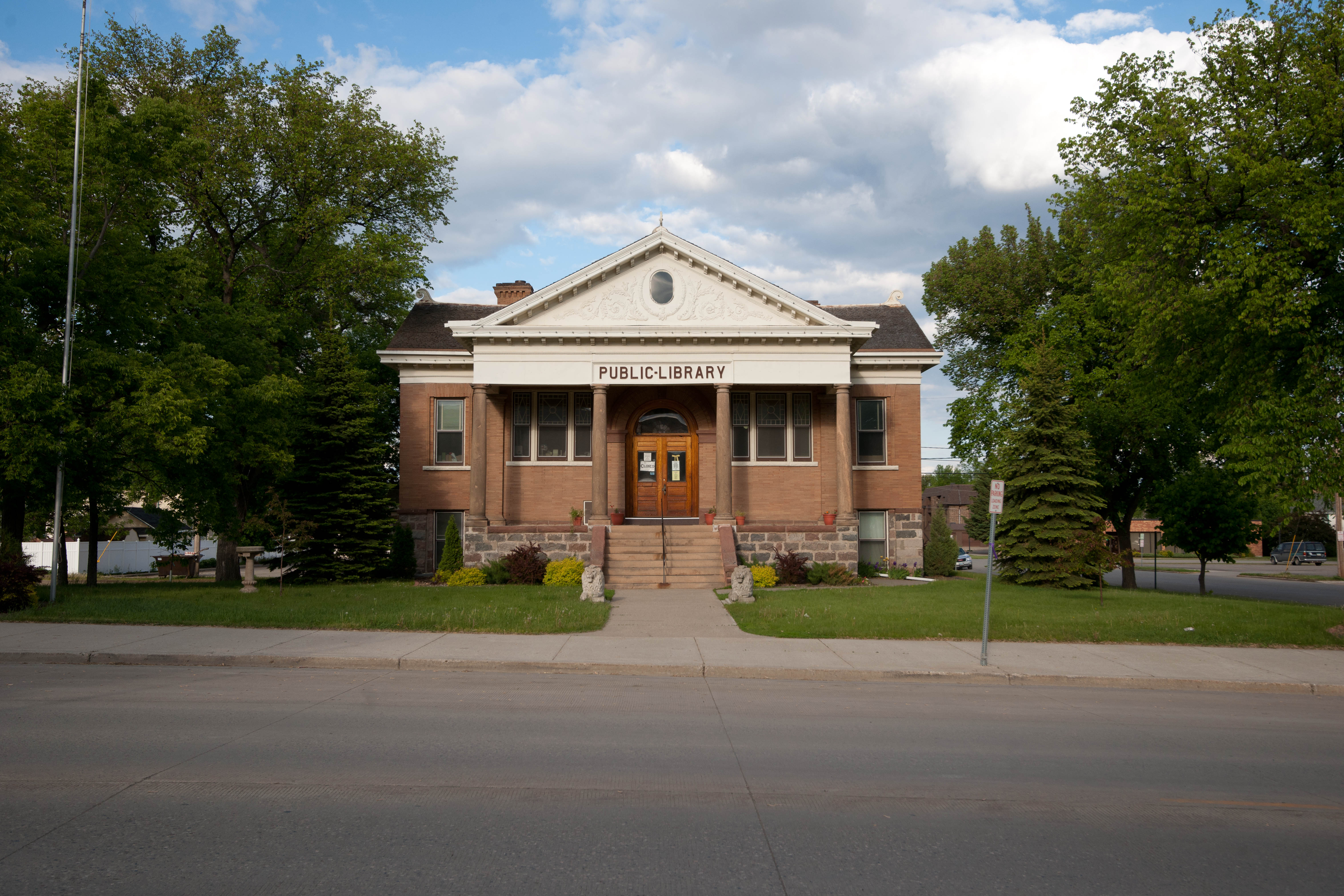
- Valley City Carnegie Library in 2009

- Location within North Dakota Location within the United States
- Location: 410 N. Central Ave., Valley City, North Dakota
- Coordinates: 46°55′35″N 98°0′11″W
- Area: less than one acre
- Built: 1903
- Architect: William C. Albrant
- Architectural style: Classical Revival, Jeffersonian Revival
- NRHP reference No.: 79003724
- Added to NRHP: October 18, 1979

The Valley City Barnes County Public Library, also known as Valley City Public Library or the Valley City Carnegie Library, in Valley City, North Dakota, United States, is a Carnegie library that was built in 1903. It was listed on the National Register of Historic Places in 1979 and still contains an original Tiffany window.

It was deemed significant as one of three libraries designed by Fargo architect William C. Albrant and one of only three relatively unaltered Carnegie libraries surviving in North Dakota.

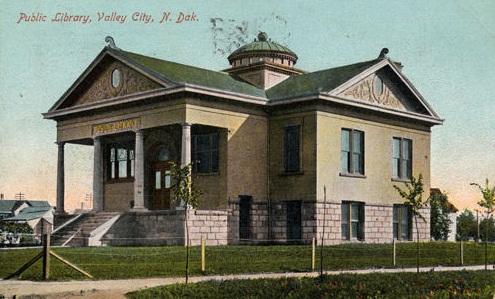
Valley City Carnegie Library, c. 1909
