= Carl Ben Eielson =

American aviator (1897–1929)

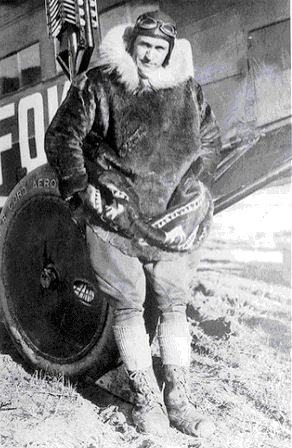
Carl Ben Eielson

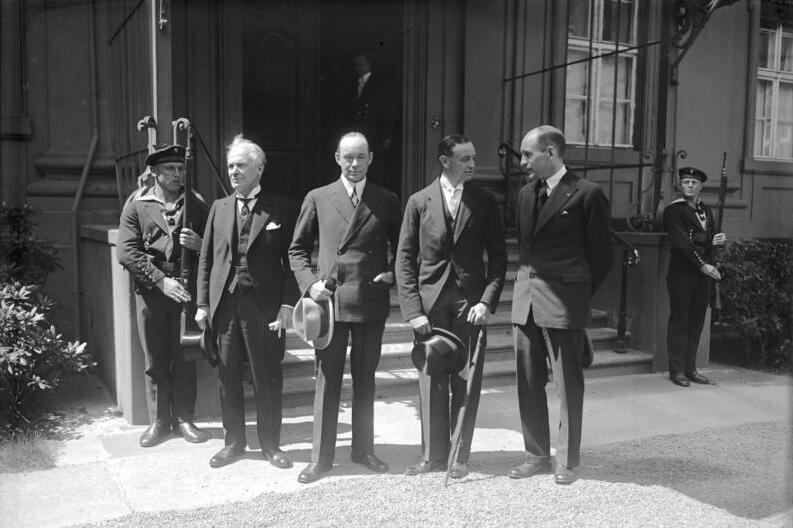
Carl Ben Eielson and George Hubert Wilkins visit Paul von Hindenburg in 1928

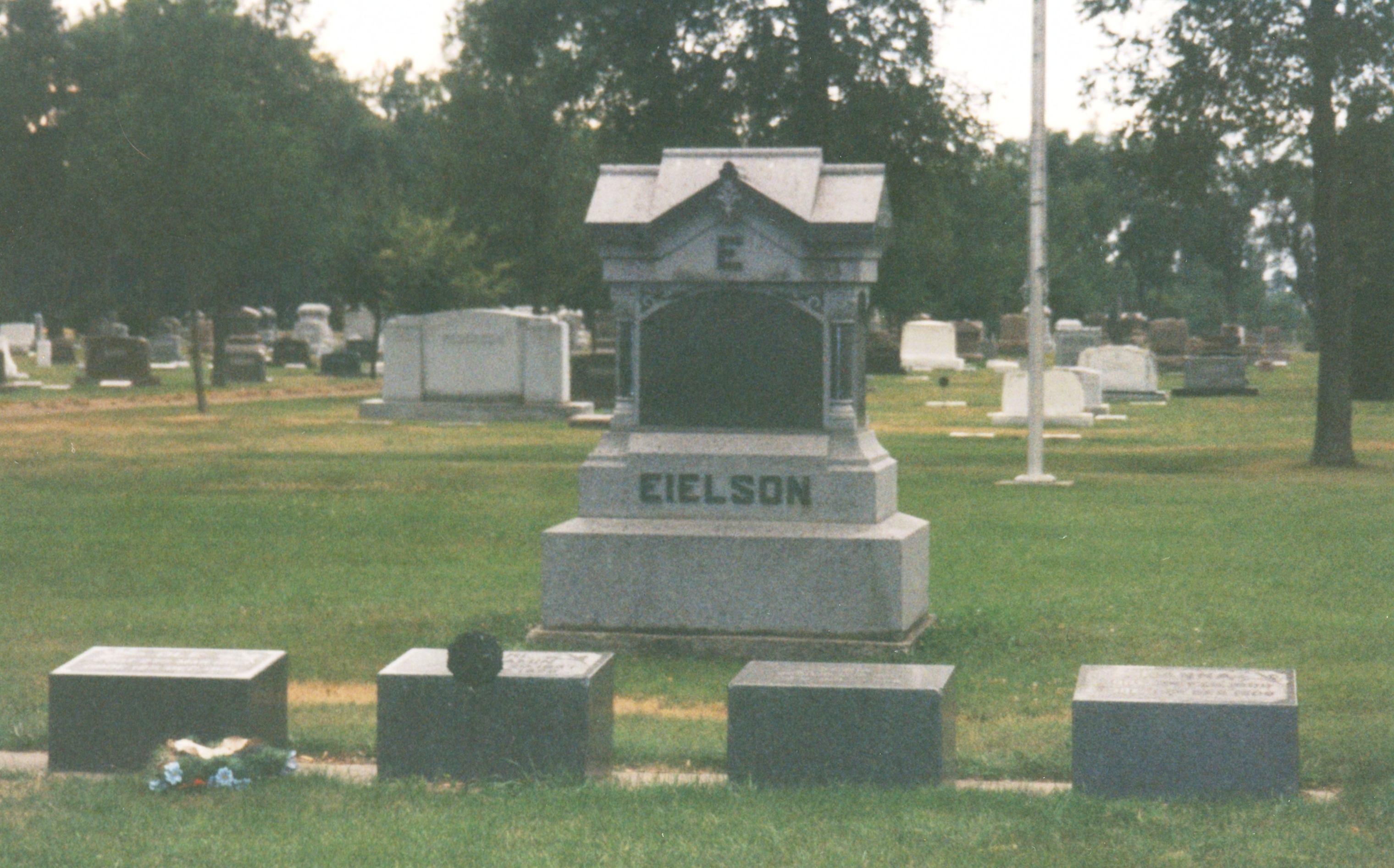
The tombstone of Eielson located in Hatton, North Dakota

Carl Benjamin Eielson (July 20, 1897 – November 9, 1929) was an American aviator, bush pilot and explorer. Eielson Air Force Base in Alaska; four schools in North Dakota, Hatton Eielson School Hatton, Carl Ben Eielson Middle School Fargo, and Carl Ben Eielson Elementary School Grand Forks as well as Ben Eielson Junior-Senior High School at the Eielson Air Force Base in Alaska are named in his honor.

In 1997 Carl Ben Eielson was inducted into the North Dakota Aviation Hall of Fame.

== Background ==
Carl Benjamin Eielson was born in Hatton, North Dakota to Norwegian immigrant parents. His interest in aviation went back to his childhood. Following the entry of the United States into World War I, Eielson found his chance to become an aviator. Eielson learned to fly in the U.S. Army Air Service in 1917. In January 1918 he enlisted in the newly formed aviation section of the U.S. Army Signal Corps. World War I ended while Eielson was in flight training.

Eielson returned to North Dakota to help in his father's store and finish his degree at the University of North Dakota. During the winter of 1919–20, he and others founded the Hatton Aero Club, the first flying club in North Dakota. After graduating from the university in 1921, he enrolled at Georgetown Law School (now Georgetown University) in Washington, D.C. Working part-time as a police officer at the Capitol, he met the Alaska Territory's delegate to the Congress, Daniel Sutherland, who persuaded Ben to go to Alaska to teach secondary school.

== Career ==
Eielson soon became the sole pilot for the Farthest North Aviation Company which was formed in 1923. In 1924, he flew the first air mail in Alaska from Fairbanks to McGrath, Alaska in under 3 hours, a distance dog sleds took up to 30 days to cover.

He also flew the first air mail from Atlanta to Jacksonville, Florida in 1926.

In March 1927, Australian polar explorer George Hubert Wilkins and Eielson explored the drift ice north of Alaska. They touched down in Eielson's airplane in the first land-plane descent onto drift ice. In April 1928, Eielson and Wilkins flew the first flight from North America over the Arctic Ocean to Europe. The flight, from Point Barrow to Spitsbergen, covered 3,540 km (2,200 mi) and took 20 hours. When Eielson accompanied Wilkins on an Antarctic expedition later in 1928, they became the first men to fly over both polar regions of the world in the same year. During the Antarctic summer of 1928–1929, Eielson and Wilkins made air explorations of the Antarctic, charting several islands which were previously unknown.

After his return from the Arctic flight, Eielson was asked to establish Alaskan Airways, a subsidiary of the Aviation Corporation of America. In 1929, Eielson died alongside his mechanic Earl Borland in an air crash in Siberia while attempting to evacuate furs and personnel from the Nanuk, a cargo vessel trapped in the ice at North Cape (now Mys Shmidta). Their bodies were discovered on February 18, 1930.

== Legacy ==
Carl Benjamin Eielson School and the Liberty ship SS Carl B. Eielson are named in his honor, as is Mount Eielson and the new visitor center at Denali National Park and Preserve. The Carl Ben Eielson Memorial Building on the University of Alaska Fairbanks campus is named in his honor. A peak in the West-Central Alaska Range is also named in his honor. An elementary school on Grand Forks Air Force Base in North Dakota is named after him as well as Ben Eielson High School on Eielson Air Force Base outside of North Pole, Alaska, and Carl Ben Eielson Middle School in Fargo, North Dakota. The Carl Ben Eielson House in Hatton, North Dakota is listed on the National Register of Historic Places.

In 1929, he was awarded the Harmon Trophy. In 1984, Carl Ben Eielson was inducted into the Scandinavian-American Hall of Fame, held each year during the Norsk Høstfest Scandinavian festival in Minot, North Dakota In 1985, he was enshrined in the National Aviation Hall of Fame in Dayton, Ohio. In 1997, Carl Ben Eielson was a recipient of the state of North Dakota's Roughrider Award.

== See also ==
- 1925 serum run to Nome
- List of Alaskan Hall of Fame pilots

== Other sources ==
- Wambheim, H.G. (1930) Ben: The Life Story of Col. Carl Ben Eielson (Hatton)
- Rolfsrud, Erling Nicolai (1952) Brother to the Eagle (Lantern Books, Alexandria, MN)
- Chandler, Edna Walker (1959) Pioneer of Alaska skies;: The story of Ben Eielson (Ginn)
- Herron, Edward Albert (1968) Wings Over Alaska: The Story of Carl Ben Eielson (Pocket Books) ISBN 978-0671297114
- Gleason, Robert J. (1977) Icebound in the Siberian Arctic (Alaska Northwest Pub. Co) ISBN 978-0882400679
- Page, Dorothy G. (1992) Polar Pilot: The Carl Ben Eielson Story. (Vero Media, Moorhead, MN) ISBN 0-8134-2936-6
