= Alderman School District No. 78 =

- U.S. National Register of Historic Places
- Location within North Dakota Location within the United States
- Location: Eleven miles north of Valley City on County Route 21, Valley City, North Dakota
- Coordinates: 47°05′15″N 98°00′11″W
- Area: 1 acre (0.40 ha)
- Built: 1925
- NRHP reference No.: 13000452
- Added to NRHP: June 25, 2013

The Alderman School District #78 in Valley City, North Dakota was built in 1925–26.

It has also been known as the Ashtabula Township Hall, as Barnes County Polling Precinct #10, as Ashtabula Lakers 4-H Clubhouse, and as 32 BA-0159;. It was listed on the National Register of Historic Places (NRHP) in 2013.

It served as a one-room rural school during 1928–1959. It is well preserved and "embodies in its architectural details many regulations that reflected current best practices for rural education, such as best natural lighting, best heating and ventilation, blackboards, and best sanitation practices of the time."

During 1959–2004, it served as the Ashtabula Township Hall.
