= Hatton, North Dakota =

- City
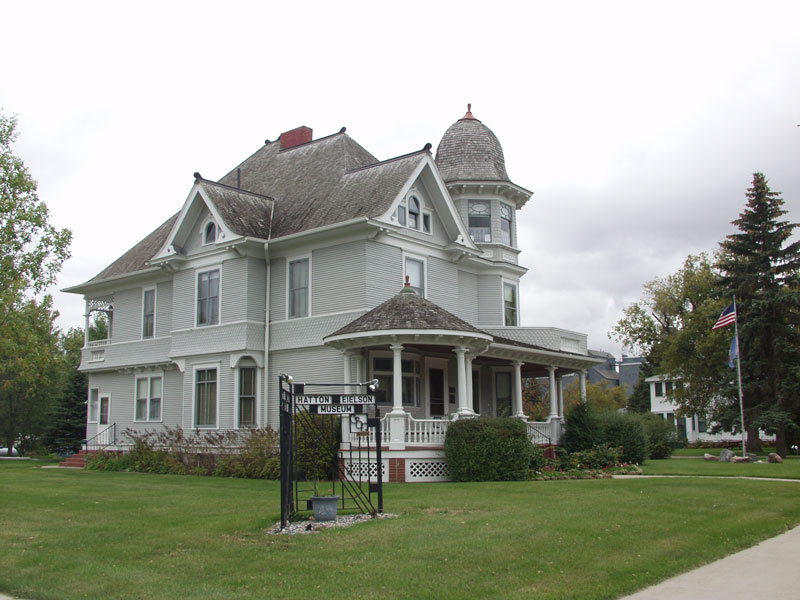
- The Hatton - Eielson Museum

- Seal

- Location of Hatton, North Dakota
- Coordinates: 47°38′13″N 97°27′30″W
- Country: United States
- State: North Dakota
- County: Traill
- Founded: 1882

Area
  - Total: 0.56 sq mi (1.44 km^{2})
  - Land: 0.56 sq mi (1.44 km^{2})
  - Water: 0 sq mi (0.00 km^{2})
- Elevation: 1,079 ft (329 m)

Population (2020)
  - Total: 712
  - Estimate (2022): 707
  - Density: 1,276.8/sq mi (492.98/km^{2})
- Time zone: UTC-6 (Central (CST))
  - Summer (DST): UTC-5 (CDT)
- ZIP code: 58240
- Area code: 701
- FIPS code: 38-36100
- GNIS feature ID: 1036085
- Website: hattonnd.com

Hatton is a city in Traill County, North Dakota, United States. The population was 712 at the 2020 census. Hatton was founded in 1882, and was named for Frank Hatton, then Assistant Postmaster General.

Hatton is the birthplace of 20th century Arctic explorer and pilot Carl Ben Eielson.

== Geography ==
According to the United States Census Bureau, the city has a total area of 0.61 square miles (1.58 km^{2}), all land.

== Demographics ==
Historical population
Census	Pop.	Note	%±
1900	430		—
1910	666		54.9%
1920	828		24.3%
1930	804		−2.9%
1940	933		16.0%
1950	991		6.2%
1960	856		−13.6%
1970	808		−5.6%
1980	787		−2.6%
1990	800		1.7%
2000	707		−11.6%
2010	777		9.9%
2020	712		−8.4%
2022 (est.)	707		−0.7%
U.S. Decennial Census; 2020 Census

=== 2010 census ===
As of the census of 2010, there were 777 people, 343 households, and 202 families residing in the city. The population density was 1,273.8 inhabitants per square mile (491.8/km^{2}). There were 394 housing units at an average density of 645.9 per square mile (249.4/km^{2}). The racial makeup of the city was 97.6% White, 0.4% Native American, 0.1% Asian, and 1.9% from two or more races. Hispanic or Latino of any race were 2.1% of the population.

There were 343 households, of which 28.0% had children under the age of 18 living with them, 47.5% were married couples living together, 9.3% had a female householder with no husband present, 2.0% had a male householder with no wife present, and 41.1% were non-families. 35.6% of all households were made up of individuals, and 19.2% had someone living alone who was 65 years of age or older. The average household size was 2.17 and the average family size was 2.84.

The median age in the city was 45.3 years. 22.8% of residents were under the age of 18; 4.2% were between the ages of 18 and 24; 22.5% were from 25 to 44; 26.8% were from 45 to 64; and 23.6% were 65 years of age or older. The gender makeup of the city was 48.0% male and 52.0% female.

=== 2000 census ===
As of the census of 2000, there were 707 people, 289 households, and 186 families residing in the city. The population density was 1,184.2 inhabitants per square mile (457.2/km^{2}). There were 331 housing units at an average density of 554.4 per square mile (214.1/km^{2}). The racial makeup of the city was 96.18% White, 0.99% Native American, 0.42% Asian, 1.56% from other races, and 0.85% from two or more races. Hispanic or Latino of any race were 3.11% of the population.

There were 289 households, out of which 27.7% had children under the age of 18 living with them, 54.0% were married couples living together, 7.6% had a female householder with no husband present, and 35.3% were non-families. 33.2% of all households were made up of individuals, and 16.6% had someone living alone who was 65 years of age or older. The average household size was 2.27 and the average family size was 2.86.

In the city, the population was spread out, with 23.2% under the age of 18, 5.5% from 18 to 24, 24.3% from 25 to 44, 19.4% from 45 to 64, and 27.6% who were 65 years of age or older. The median age was 42 years. For every 100 females, there were 91.1 males. For every 100 females age 18 and over, there were 86.0 males.

The median income for a household in the city was $27,031, and the median income for a family was $38,250. Males had a median income of $29,554 versus $20,750 for females. The per capita income for the city was $16,131. About 12.2% of families and 16.0% of the population were below the poverty line, including 26.6% of those under age 18 and 9.2% of those age 65 or over.

== Education ==
It is in the Hatton Public School District 7.

== Notable people ==
- Austin Foss, state representative for North Dakota's 44th district.
- Kermit Edward Bye, federal judge on the Court of Appeals for the Eighth Circuit
- Carl Ben Eielson, pioneer aviator, first person to cross the Arctic in an airplane (1928)
- Aagot Raaen, educator and author

== See also ==
- Carl Ben Eielson House
- Andres O. Ness House
