= Ladbury Church =

Historic church in North Dakota, United States

- U.S. National Register of Historic Places
- Location within North Dakota Location within the United States
- Nearest city: Dazey, North Dakota
- Coordinates: 47.22606°N 98.07514°W
- Area: 4 acres (1.6 ha)
- Built: 1899
- Architectural style: Late Gothic Revival
- NRHP reference No.: 05001140
- Added to NRHP: October 4, 2005

The Ladbury Church, near Dazey, North Dakota, was built in 1899 in Late Gothic Revival style. It was listed on the National Register of Historic Places in 2005. The listing included two contributing buildings and a contributing site on 4 acres (1.6 ha).

Alternate names associated with the site are Union Congregational Church, Ladbury Church, Kensal Church, Sibley Trail Union Congregational Church, and Sunnyside Church and Cemetery.
