= O.C. Sarles House =

Historic house in North Dakota, United States

- Formerly listed on the U.S. National Register of Historic Places
- Location: 2nd Ave. and 3rd St., NE, Hillsboro, North Dakota
- Area: less than one acre
- Built: 1881
- Built by: Sarles, O.C.
- Architectural style: Late Victorian
- NRHP reference No.: 85000562
- Removed from NRHP: March 25, 2009

The O.C. Sarles House at 2nd Ave. and 3rd St., NE, in Hillsboro, North Dakota was built in 1881. It was listed on the National Register of Historic Places (NRHP), but it was removed from the NRHP in 2009.

Its NRHP nomination in 1984 identified it as "Hillsboro's earliest and finest example of Victorian architecture."

Delistings of NRHP-listed properties usually follow demolition or other severe loss of historic integrity of a building.
