= KMAV-FM =

- Mayville, North Dakota; United States
- Broadcast area: Grand Forks, Fargo–Moorhead
- Frequency: 105.5 MHz
- Branding: KMAV 105.5 FM

Programming
- Format: Commercial; Country
- Affiliations: ABC News Radio; CNBC; Westwood One; Minnesota Twins

Ownership
- Owner: KMSR, Inc.
- Sister stations: KMSR

History
- First air date: 1976
- Call sign meaning: MAV = Mayville and the Valley

Technical information
- Licensing authority: FCC
- Facility ID: 54335
- Class: C3
- ERP: 25,000 watts
- HAAT: 100 meters (328 feet)
- Transmitter coordinates: 47°29′57″N 97°21′03″W

Links
- Public license information: Public file; LMS
- Webcast: Listen Live
- Website: kmav.com

KMAV-FM (105.5 MHz) is a radio station in Mayville, North Dakota, United States, serving the Red River Valley of eastern North Dakota and northwest Minnesota with a country music format on weekdays and oldies format on weekends. KMAV is known as "Your Sports Leader in the Red River Valley" in reference of their coverage of local high school sport events.

Former logo

== Programming ==
Notable programming includes hourly updates from CBS News and periodic updates from the Dakota News Network and Red River Farm Network. During the school year, the station features "Comet Radio" which consists of different shows from students and staff from Mayville's local college, Mayville State University. It airs on Wednesdays during the school year 4:00-6:00pm.

While known for local sports coverage, KMAV-FM also airs The Dan Patrick Show, country music and oldies. Originally on 101.7, KMAV-FM moved to 105.5 in the mid-1980s to make room for an upgrade to KFGO-FM 101.9 in Fargo. KMAV-FM simulcasted with KMSR (formerly KMAV-AM) until November 2003.

=== Family matters ===
KMSR is family owned. Five-time North Dakota Sportscaster of the Year, Dan Keating, calls basketball, baseball, football, volleyball, and wrestling. His wife, Mary, is the company's president. Their sons, Craig and Mike, are also active in the company.

=== Sports ===
KMAV carries over three hundred local game broadcasts per year. In addition to local sports, KMAV airs hundreds of NFL, college football, and college basketball games from Westwood One and Sports USA Radio networks.
