= First State Bank of Buxton =

- U.S. National Register of Historic Places
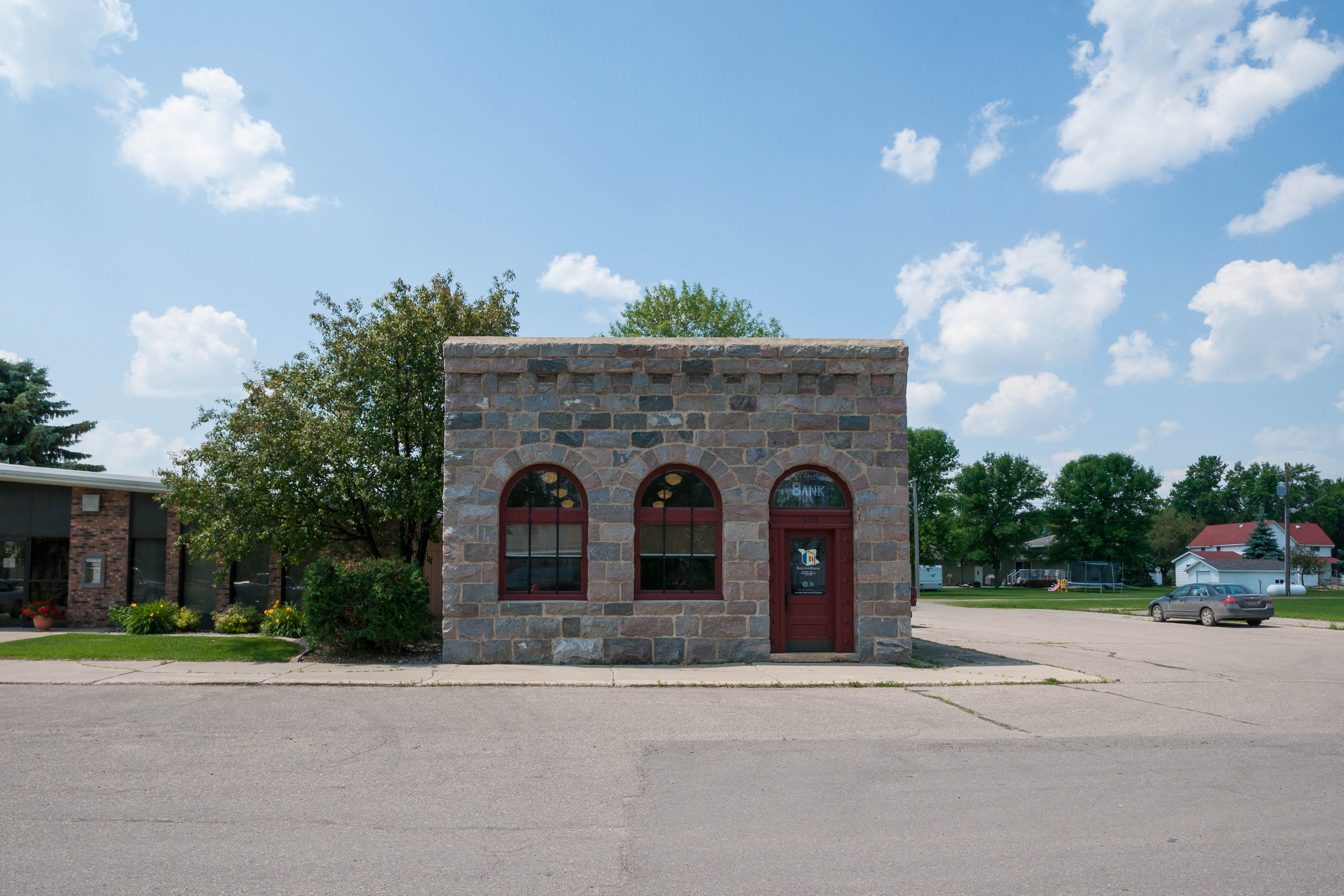
- Historic bank building in 2013

- Location within North Dakota Location within the United States
- Location: 423 Broadway St., Buxton, North Dakota
- Coordinates: 47°36′10″N 97°5′51″W
- Area: less than one acre
- Built: 1884
- Built by: Hanson, Oliver S.
- NRHP reference No.: 78001995
- Added to NRHP: February 14, 1978

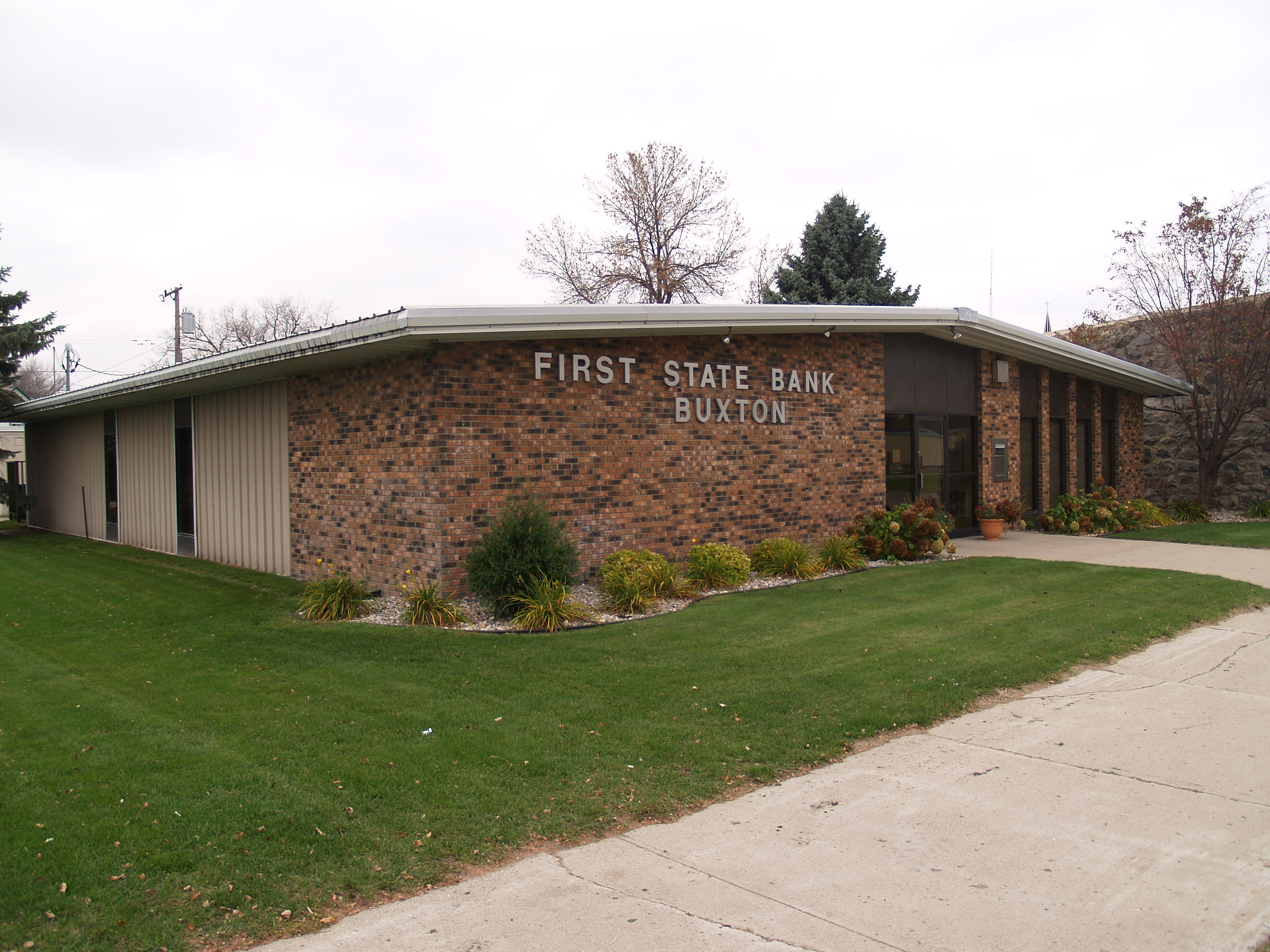
Current building of First State Bank of Buxton, immediately adjacent to the historic building

The First State Bank of Buxton is a bank in Buxton, North Dakota. Its former building at 423 Broadway St. in Buxton, built in 1884, is listed on the U.S. National Register of Historic Places. The historic building was listed on the National Register of Historic Places in 1978.

The former bank building is a one-story 26-by-46-foot (7.9 m × 14.0 m) flat-roofed building with 2-foot (61 cm) thick granite walls. Its significance is asserted to be for its architecture and for its association with Oliver S. Hanson, who established the bank.
