= All Saints Episcopal Church (Valley City, North Dakota) =

Historic church in North Dakota, United States

- All Saints' Episcopal Church
- U.S. National Register of Historic Places
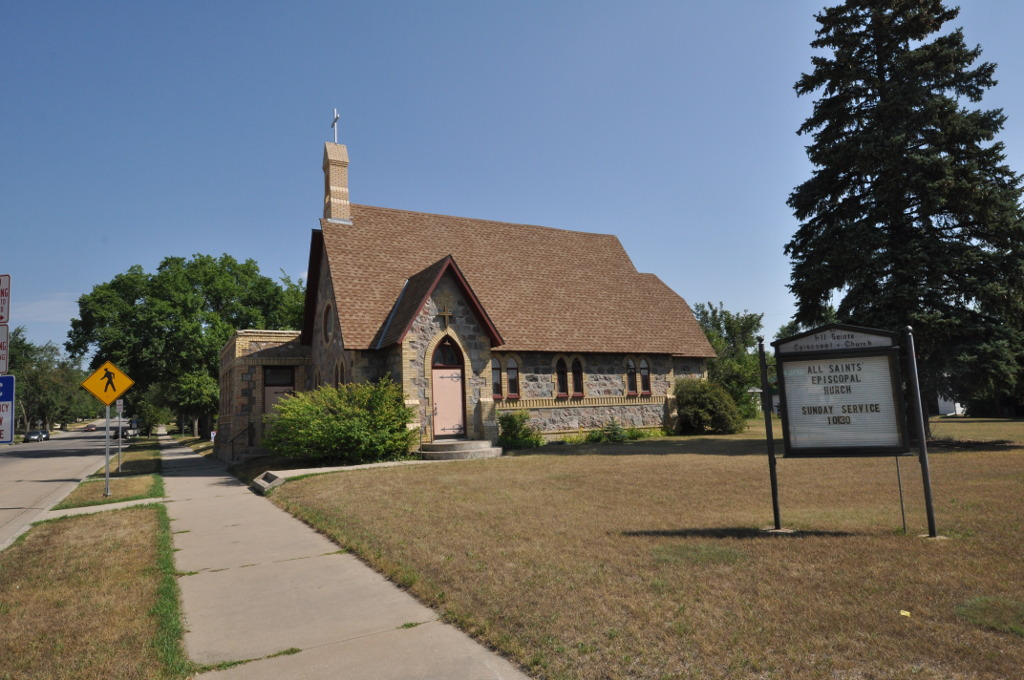

- Location within North Dakota Location within the United States
- Location: 516 N. Central Ave., Valley City, North Dakota
- Coordinates: 46°55′41.82″N 98°0′5.17″W
- Area: less than one acre
- Built: 1881
- Architectural style: Gothic Revival
- MPS: Episcopal Churches of North Dakota MPS
- NRHP reference No.: 92001605
- Added to NRHP: December 3, 1992

All Saints' Episcopal Church built in 1881 is a historic Episcopal church building located in Valley City, Barnes County, North Dakota. Designed in the Late Gothic Revival style of architecture by an unknown architect, it was built of local fieldstone with concrete mortar and a wooden shake roof. It is noted as the "first stone Episcopal church [built] in North Dakota." On December 3, 1992, it was added to the National Register of Historic Places as part of the Episcopal Churches of North Dakota Multiple Property Submission.

All Saints is still a small but active parish in the Episcopal Diocese of North Dakota.

In 2015, the church reported 19 members; in 2023, it reported 10 members. No membership statistics were reported in 2024 national parochial reports. Average Sunday Attendance (ASA) reported in 2024 was zero persons. This was a relative decrease from ASA of six persons reported in 2015.
