= KMSR =

Radio station in Northwood, North Dakota

- Northwood, North Dakota; United States
- Broadcast area: Mayville–Portland/Grand Forks/Fargo–Moorhead
- Frequency: 1520 kHz
- Branding: 99 KMSR

Programming
- Format: Sports, Classic hits
- Affiliations: Fox Sports Radio

Ownership
- Owner: KMSR, Inc.
- Sister stations: KMAV-FM

History
- First air date: October 20, 1967
- Former call signs: KMAV (until 2008)

Technical information
- Licensing authority: FCC
- Facility ID: 54336
- Class: D
- Power: 1,500 watts (daytime only)
- Transmitter coordinates: 47°29′57″N 97°21′03″W
- Translator: (98.9 K255DG) Mayville ({{{3}}})

Links
- Public license information: Public file; LMS
- Webcast: Listen live
- Website: KMSR Online

KMSR (1520 AM, "99 KMSR") is a radio station in Mayville, North Dakota, licensed to Northwood, serving the Red River Valley of eastern North Dakota and northwest Minnesota. Formerly known as "Sports Radio 1520", KMSR rebranded as "99 KMSR" upon launching an FM translator in late 2020. KMSR 1520 AM is on the air in the daytime only, so it signs off at sunset, and signs on again at sunrise. Its translator, K255DG, operates 24 hours a day on 98.9 FM.

== Programming ==
KMSR airs The Dan Patrick Show, The Herd with Colin Cowherd, Wrestling Observer Live, and Harry's Hypnosis with Harry Lipsiea, occasionally preempted by local sports coverage. Aside from sports talk that airs weekdays from 8 to 3:30, KMSR carries a classic hits format. KMSR covers the Red River Valley area, including Mayville, Grand Forks, and Fargo. Simulcast for many years, KMAV-FM and KMSR (formerly KMAV) have been broadcasting separate programming since November 2003.

=== Family matters ===
KMSR is family owned. Five-time North Dakota Sportscaster of the Year, Dan Keating, calls basketball, baseball, football, volleyball, and softball. His wife, Mary, is the company's president. Their sons, Craig and Mike, are also active in the company.

=== Sports ===
In addition to local sports and syndicated sports talk, KMSR carries NFL, college football, and college basketball games from Westwood One and Sports USA Radio networks.

== Translators ==
KMSR broadcasts on the following FM translator:

| Call sign | Frequency | City of license | FID | ERP (W) | Class | FCC info |
|---|---|---|---|---|---|---|
| K255DG | 98.9 FM | Mayville, North Dakota | 201107 | 250 | D | LMS |
