= Ellingson Farm District =

Historic district in North Dakota, United States

- Formerly listed on the U.S. National Register of Historic Places
- U.S. Historic district
- Nearest city: Hillsboro, North Dakota
- Area: 9 acres (3.6 ha)
- Built: 1882
- NRHP reference No.: 85002343

Significant dates
- Added to NRHP: September 12, 1985
- Removed from NRHP: March 23, 2026

The Ellingson Farm District near Hillsboro, North Dakota is a farm that was developed in 1882. It was listed on the National Register of Historic Places in 1985 and delisted in 2026. It then included nine contributing buildings, a contributing site, and a contributing structure on its 9 acres (3.6 ha).
