= Lucken Farm =

- U.S. National Register of Historic Places
- U.S. Historic district
- Location within North Dakota Location within the United States
- Nearest city: Portland, North Dakota
- Coordinates: 47°31′33″N 97°22′9″W
- Area: 5.9 acres (2.4 ha)
- Built: 1888
- Architectural style: Late 19th and Early 20th Century American Movements, Stick
- NRHP reference No.: 86001049
- Added to NRHP: May 14, 1986

The Lucken Farm near Portland, North Dakota, United States, is a bonanza farm that was developed by 1888. The owner of the farm was Halleck E. Lucken, the son of Norwegian immigrants. The farm was listed on the National Register of Historic Places in 1986. The listing included seven contributing buildings on.
