= Mayville, North Dakota =

- City
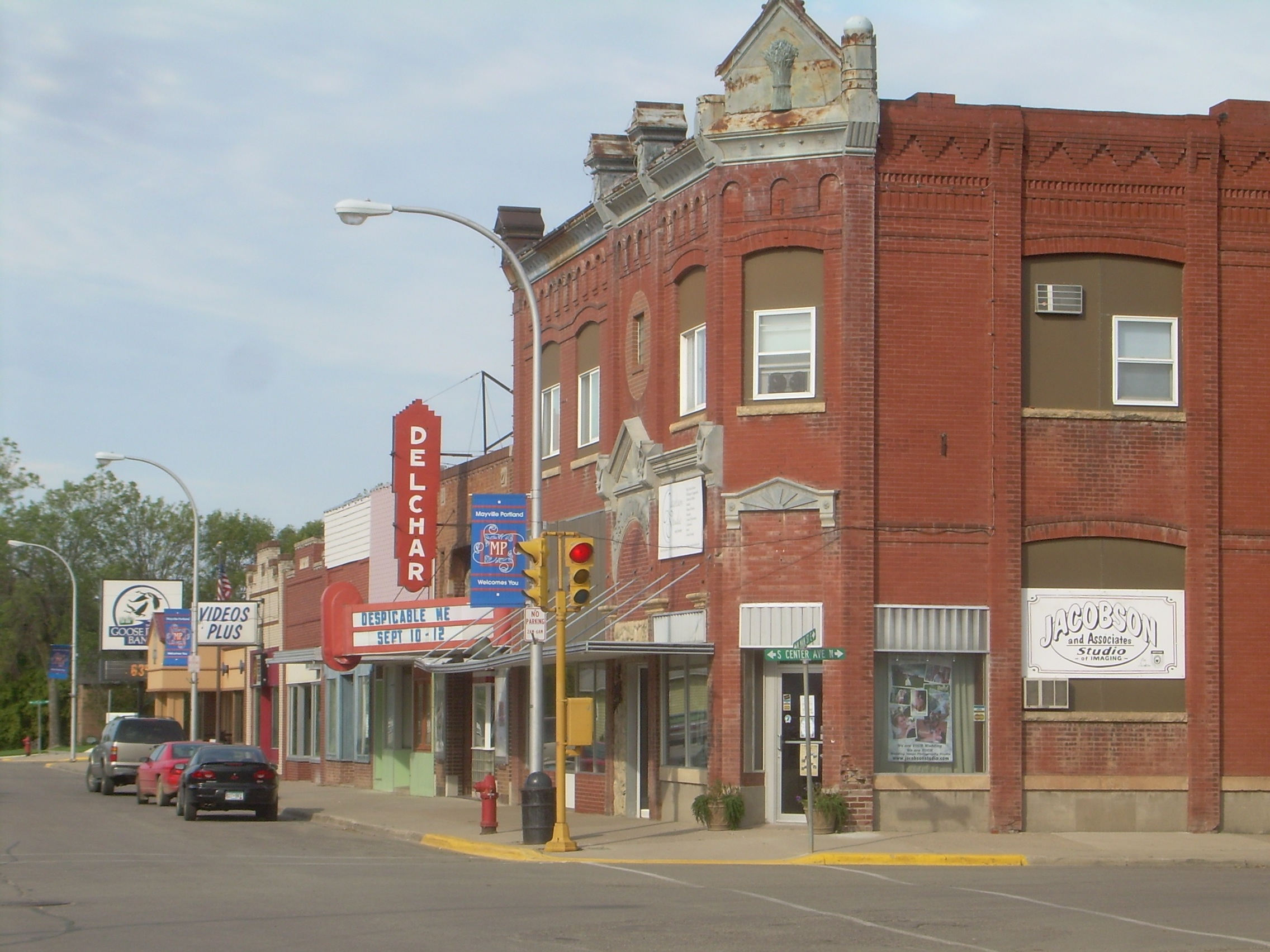
- Downtown Mayville

- Location of Mayville, North Dakota
- Coordinates: 47°29′54″N 97°19′35″W
- Country: United States
- State: North Dakota
- County: Traill
- Founded: 1881

Government
  - Mayor: Karl Jorgenson

Area
  - Total: 1.88 sq mi (4.88 km^{2})
  - Land: 1.88 sq mi (4.88 km^{2})
  - Water: 0 sq mi (0.00 km^{2})
- Elevation: 950 ft (290 m)

Population (2020)
  - Total: 1,854
  - Estimate (2022): 1,820
  - Density: 980/sq mi (380/km^{2})
- Time zone: UTC-6 (Central (CST))
  - Summer (DST): UTC-5 (CDT)
- ZIP code: 58257
- Area code: 701
- FIPS code: 38-51500
- GNIS feature ID: 1036155
- Highways: ND 18, ND 200
- Website: mayvilleportland.com

Mayville is a city in Traill County, North Dakota, United States. The population was 1,854 at the 2020 census. Mayville is the largest community in Traill County. It was founded in 1881. It is named for May Arnold, the first white child born in the immediate area.

Mayville is often grouped with the neighboring city of Portland and called "May-Port". It is home to Mayville State University.

== Geography ==
Mayville is in the Red River Valley on the banks of the Goose River. The Valley was once a part of glacial Lake Agassiz. As the glacier receded, it left the land very flat and very rich. The area around Mayville is prime agricultural land.

According to the United States Census Bureau, the city has an area of 1.92 square miles (4.97 km^{2}), all land.

== Demographics ==
Historical population
Census	Pop.	Note	%±
1890	657		—
1900	1,106		68.3%
1910	1,070		−3.3%
1920	1,218		13.8%
1930	1,199		−1.6%
1940	1,351		12.7%
1950	1,790		32.5%
1960	2,168		21.1%
1970	2,554		17.8%
1980	2,255		−11.7%
1990	2,092		−7.2%
2000	1,953		−6.6%
2010	1,858		−4.9%
2020	1,854		−0.2%
2022 (est.)	1,820		−1.8%
U.S. Decennial Census; 2020 Census

=== 2010 census ===
As of the census of 2010, there were 1,858 people, 773 households, and 384 families living in the city. The population density was 967.7 inhabitants per square mile (373.6/km^{2}). There were 872 housing units at an average density of 454.2 per square mile (175.4/km^{2}). The racial makeup of the city was 94.2% White, 1.8% African American, 0.6% Native American, 0.2% Asian, 0.1% Pacific Islander, 0.9% from other races, and 2.2% from two or more races. Hispanic or Latino of any race were 2.0% of the population.

There were 773 households, of which 19.3% had children under the age of 18 living with them, 41.4% were married couples living together, 6.1% had a female householder with no husband present, 2.2% had a male householder with no wife present, and 50.3% were non-families. 39.2% of all households were made up of individuals, and 17.8% had someone living alone who was 65 years of age or older. The average household size was 2.03 and the average family size was 2.74.

The median age in the city was 37.9 years. 15.3% of residents were under the age of 18; 23.2% were between the ages of 18 and 24; 17% were from 25 to 44; 22.1% were from 45 to 64; and 22.4% were 65 years of age or older. The gender makeup of the city was 48.8% male and 51.2% female.

=== 2000 census ===
As of the census of 2000, there were 1,953 people, 752 households, and 417 families living in the city. The population density was 1,216.7 inhabitants per square mile (469.8/km^{2}). There were 876 housing units at an average density of 545.7/sq mi (210.1/km^{2}). The racial makeup of the city was 97.49% White, 0.26% African American, 1.48% Native American, 0.26% Asian, 0.05% Pacific Islander, 0.31% from other races, and 0.15% from two or more races. Hispanic or Latino of any race were 0.46% of the population.

There were 752 households, out of which 23.8% had children under the age of 18 living with them, 46.1% were married couples living together, 6.6% had a female householder with no husband present, and 44.5% were non-families. 35.0% of all households were made up of individuals, and 18.1% had someone living alone who was 65 years of age or older. The average household size was 2.16 and the average family size was 2.82.

In the city, the population was spread out, with 17.8% under the age of 18, 23.5% from 18 to 24, 18.3% from 25 to 44, 17.2% from 45 to 64, and 23.3% who were 65 years of age or older. The median age was 36 years. For every 100 females, there were 93.2 males. For every 100 females age 18 and over, there were 89.5 males.

The median income for a household in the city was $34,635, and the median income for a family was $44,931. Males had a median income of $34,107 versus $21,615 for females. The per capita income for the city was $17,079. About 6.2% of families and 13.4% of the population were below the poverty line, including 12.4% of those under age 18 and 6.2% of those age 65 or over.

== Transportation ==
=== Airport ===
The Mayville Municipal Airport is a city-owned, public-use airport one nautical mile (2 km) south of Mayville's central business district.

== Education ==
Mayville is the home of Mayville State University.

Mayville is served by the May-Port CG Public Schools system. "May-Port CG" stands for "Mayville-Portland-Clifford-Galesburg." This system operates Peter Boe Jr. Elementary School, May-Port CG Middle School, and May-Port CG High School.

== Recreation ==
Mayville offers several parks. The largest is Island Park. The MayPort Community Center opened in 2000 and offers space for hockey games and other community events. Mayville Water Park opened in 2002 and features one of the area's larger water slides. Mayville is also home to the nine-hole Mayville Golf Club.

== Media ==
=== Radio ===
Mayville radio stations:

FM radio:

- KMAV 105.5 "The Red River Valley's Sports Play-by-Play Leader" (Country, Sports), Pop)

AM radio:

- KMSR 1520 "Sports Radio 1520" (Sports)

== Notable people ==
- Clarence Norman Brunsdale (1891–1978), U.S. Senator, 24th governor of North Dakota
- Gulbrand Hagen (1864–1919), newspaper editor and publisher
- Ben Jacobson, men's basketball head coach at Utah State University
- RaeAnn Kelsch, North Dakota politician
- Dean Knudson, Wisconsin politician
- Jim LeClair, football coach and NFL player for the Bengals
- Lute Olson, former University of Arizona coach in College Basketball Hall of Fame

== Climate ==
This climatic region is typified by large seasonal temperature differences, with warm to hot (and often humid) summers and cold (sometimes severely cold) winters. According to the Köppen Climate Classification system, Mayville has a humid continental climate, abbreviated "Dfb" on climate maps.

Climate data for Mayville, North Dakota (1991–2020 normals, extremes 1893–present)
Month	Jan	Feb	Mar	Apr	May	Jun	Jul	Aug	Sep	Oct	Nov	Dec	Year
Record high °F (°C)	56 (13)	60 (16)	81 (27)	99 (37)	104 (40)	105 (41)	114 (46)	104 (40)	102 (39)	94 (34)	79 (26)	57 (14)	114 (46)
Mean daily maximum °F (°C)	16.1 (−8.8)	21.0 (−6.1)	33.4 (0.8)	51.3 (10.7)	66.6 (19.2)	76.2 (24.6)	80.1 (26.7)	79.2 (26.2)	70.1 (21.2)	54.4 (12.4)	36.3 (2.4)	22.3 (−5.4)	50.6 (10.3)
Daily mean °F (°C)	6.2 (−14.3)	10.3 (−12.1)	23.2 (−4.9)	39.7 (4.3)	53.6 (12.0)	64.7 (18.2)	68.4 (20.2)	66.5 (19.2)	57.2 (14.0)	43.1 (6.2)	26.8 (−2.9)	13.4 (−10.3)	39.4 (4.1)
Mean daily minimum °F (°C)	−3.7 (−19.8)	−0.5 (−18.1)	13.0 (−10.6)	28.0 (−2.2)	40.6 (4.8)	53.2 (11.8)	56.6 (13.7)	53.9 (12.2)	44.2 (6.8)	31.7 (−0.2)	17.3 (−8.2)	4.5 (−15.3)	28.2 (−2.1)
Record low °F (°C)	−41 (−41)	−40 (−40)	−32 (−36)	−9 (−23)	11 (−12)	21 (−6)	26 (−3)	30 (−1)	15 (−9)	−9 (−23)	−30 (−34)	−36 (−38)	−41 (−41)
Average precipitation inches (mm)	0.54 (14)	0.53 (13)	0.96 (24)	1.50 (38)	3.29 (84)	4.11 (104)	3.88 (99)	2.66 (68)	2.68 (68)	2.11 (54)	0.79 (20)	0.85 (22)	23.90 (607)
Average precipitation days (≥ 0.01 in)	4.9	5.8	5.7	6.8	11.7	13.1	9.5	8.7	8.1	8.4	4.9	7.2	94.8
Source: NOAA
