= National Register of Historic Places listings in Cass County, North Dakota =

Location of Cass County in North Dakota

This is a list of the National Register of Historic Places listings in Cass County, North Dakota.

This is intended to be a complete list of the properties and districts on the National Register of Historic Places in Cass County, North Dakota, United States. The locations of National Register properties and districts for which the latitude and longitude coordinates are included below, may be seen in a map.

There are 38 properties and districts listed on the National Register in the county. Another six properties were once listed but have been removed.

Contents: Counties in North Dakota
Adams | Barnes | Benson | Billings | Bottineau | Bowman | Burke | Burleigh | Cass | Cavalier | Dickey | Divide | Dunn | Eddy | Emmons | Foster | Golden Valley | Grand Forks | Grant | Griggs | Hettinger | Kidder | LaMoure | Logan | McHenry | McIntosh | McKenzie | McLean | Mercer | Morton | Mountrail | Nelson | Oliver | Pembina | Pierce | Ramsey | Ransom | Renville | Richland | Rolette | Sargent | Sheridan | Sioux | Slope | Stark | Steele | Stutsman | Towner | Traill | Walsh | Ward | Wells | Williams

This National Park Service list is complete through NPS recent listings posted September 11, 2026.

== Current listings ==
	Name on the Register	Image	Date listed	Location	City or town	Description
1	1916 Buffalo High School	1916 Buffalo High School	May 10, 2001 (#01000501)	303 Pearl Street, North; 46°55′16″N 97°32′59″W	Buffalo	
2	George and Beth Anderson House	George and Beth Anderson House	June 19, 2017 (#100001221)	1458 South River Road; 46°51′29″N 96°46′57″W	Fargo	
3	Barrington Apartments	Barrington Apartments	July 27, 1989 (#88000982)	219 12th Street, South; 46°52′19″N 96°47′51″W	Fargo	
4	M.E. Beebe Historic District	M.E. Beebe Historic District	November 24, 2015 (#15000825)	Northeastern corner of Third Avenue North and North 8th Street; 46°52′47″N 96°47′30″W	Fargo	
5	Black Building	Black Building	December 6, 2016 (#16000821)	114 Broadway North; 46°52′39″N 96°47′17″W	Fargo	
6	Cass County Court House, Jail, and Sheriff's House	Cass County Court House, Jail, and Sheriff's House	December 22, 1983 (#83004062)	S. 9th St. between S. 2nd and 3rd Aves. 46°52′19″N 96°47′35″W	Fargo	
7	Casselton Commercial Historic District	Casselton Commercial Historic District	October 28, 1982 (#82001311)	Roughly bounded by Front and 1st St. between 6th and 8th Aves. 46°54′03″N 97°12′38″W	Casselton	
8	DeLendrecie's Department Store	DeLendrecie's Department Store	October 22, 1979 (#79003725)	620-624 Main Street; 46°52′27″N 96°47′20″W	Fargo	
9	Dibley House	Dibley House	November 25, 1980 (#80004282)	331 8th Avenue, South; 46°51′59″N 96°47′01″W	Fargo	
10	Downtown Fargo District	Downtown Fargo District	October 13, 1983 (#83004064)	Roughly Roberts Street from South First Avenue to Fifth Avenue North, and Main Avenue; 46°52′41″N 96°47′24″W	Fargo	
11	Fargo City Detention Hospital	Fargo City Detention Hospital	April 7, 1987 (#86003741)	57 11th Avenue, North; 46°53′21″N 96°46′37″W	Fargo	
12	Fargo-Moorhead YMCA Sign	Fargo-Moorhead YMCA Sign	March 17, 2022 (#100007495)	400 1st Ave. South; 46°52′23″N 96°47′10″W	Fargo	
13	Fargo Oak Grove Residential Historic District	Fargo Oak Grove Residential Historic District	October 13, 2011 (#11000744)	North & South Terrace Avenues, east of Elm Street, North; 46°53′00″N 96°46′34″W	Fargo	
14	Fargo South Residential District	Fargo South Residential District	September 19, 1983 (#83001929)	Roughly bounded by 5th and 17th Avenues South, 7th and 9th Streets South; 46°51′43″N 96°47′30″W	Fargo	
15	Fargo Theatre	Fargo Theatre	October 21, 1982 (#82001312)	314 Broadway; 46°52′45″N 96°47′16″W	Fargo	
16	Federal Building and U.S. Post Office	Federal Building and U.S. Post Office	June 4, 2021 (#100006635)	657 2nd Ave. North; 46°52′42″N 96°47′24″W	Fargo	
17	First Presbyterian Church		June 4, 2025 (#100011895)	620 Second Avenue North; 46°52′41″N 96°47′26″W	Fargo	
18	Grand Lodge of North Dakota, Ancient Order of United Workmen	Grand Lodge of North Dakota, Ancient Order of United Workmen	August 24, 1979 (#79001770)	112-114 North Roberts Street; 46°52′40″N 96°47′23″W	Fargo	
19	James Holes House	James Holes House	April 7, 1987 (#86003740)	1230 Fifth Street, North; 46°53′29″N 96°47′10″W	Fargo	
20	Knerr Block, Floyd Block, McHench Building and Webster and Cole Building	Knerr Block, Floyd Block, McHench Building and Webster and Cole Building	May 12, 1983 (#83001930)	13, 15, 17-19, and 21-23 8th Street, South; 46°52′26″N 96°47′27″W	Fargo	
21	Lewis House	Lewis House	October 18, 1979 (#79003726)	1002 Third Avenue, South; 46°52′17″N 96°47′46″W	Fargo	
22	Robert Lindemann House		September 2, 1994 (#94001073)	5126 138th Avenue Southeast; 46°40′08″N 97°34′32″W	Enderlin	
23	Masonic Block	Masonic Block	August 3, 1979 (#79001771)	11 South 8th Street; 46°51′55″N 96°47′29″W	Fargo	
24	North Dakota State University District	North Dakota State University District	October 6, 1986 (#86003261)	Roughly bounded by North University Drive, 12th Avenue, North, Service Drive, and Campus Avenue; 46°53′34″N 96°48′00″W	Fargo	
25	North Side Fargo Builder's Residential Historic District	North Side Fargo Builder's Residential Historic District	April 7, 1987 (#86003737)	Roughly bounded by Benjamin Franklin School area and Golf Course, 1st St., 12th Ave., N, and 4th St. 46°53′33″N 96°47′00″W	Fargo	
26	North Side Fargo High Style Residential Historic District	North Side Fargo High Style Residential Historic District	April 7, 1987 (#86003739)	Roughly bounded by 12th Ave. N, 4th St., 11th Ave., N, and 7th St. 46°53′22″N 96°47′11″W	Fargo	
27	Northern Pacific Railway Depot	Northern Pacific Railway Depot	February 13, 1975 (#75001304)	701 Main Avenue; 46°52′29″N 96°47′21″W	Fargo	
28	Old Stone Church	Old Stone Church	March 29, 1996 (#96000311)	206 North Wilcox Avenue; 46°55′18″N 97°33′03″W	Buffalo	
29	Pence Automobile Company Warehouse	Pence Automobile Company Warehouse	January 7, 1994 (#93001478)	301 N. P Ave. 46°52′34″N 96°46′57″W	Fargo	
30	Powers Hotel	Powers Hotel	May 12, 1983 (#83001931)	400 Broadway; 46°52′48″N 96°47′16″W	Fargo	
31	Research Plot 2	Research Plot 2	October 8, 1991 (#91001474)	Near the junction of Centennial Ave. and 18th St., N. on the North Dakota State University campus 46°53′39″N 96°48′31″W	Fargo	
32	Research Plot 30	Research Plot 30	October 8, 1991 (#91001475)	Near the junction of Centennial Ave. and 18th St., N. on the North Dakota State University campus 46°53′39″N 96°48′39″W	Fargo	
33	Shea Site	Shea Site	July 25, 1996 (#96000817)	Address Restricted	Embden	
34	Sprunk Site (32CS04478)	Sprunk Site (32CS04478)	January 9, 2007 (#06001226)	Address Restricted	Enderlin	
35	St. Stephen's Episcopal Church	St. Stephen's Episcopal Church	December 3, 1992 (#92001609)	241 Langer Avenue North; 46°54′12″N 97°12′39″W	Casselton	
36	Union Storage & Transfer Cold Storage Warehouse and Armour Creamery Building	Union Storage & Transfer Cold Storage Warehouse and Armour Creamery Building	February 9, 2007 (#07000016)	1026-1032 Northern Pacific Ave. and 1034-1102 Northern Pacific Ave. 46°52′36″N 96°47′43″W	Fargo	
37	Watts Free Library	Watts Free Library	May 31, 1990 (#89002304)	101 Third Street, North; 46°39′12″N 97°14′45″W	Leonard	
38	Woodrow Wilson School	Woodrow Wilson School	October 24, 2012 (#12000881)	315 North University Drive; 46°52′48″N 96°47′51″W	Fargo	Now known as "Dakota High School"

== Former listings ==
	Name on the Register	Image	Date listed	Date removed	Location	City or town	Description
1	Burlington Northern Depot		August 29, 1977 (#77001024)	December 6, 2016	Woodard Avenue; 47°00′17″N 97°13′09″W	Amenia	
2	Cole Hotel		May 9, 1983 (#83001928)	October 21, 2009	401-407 Northern Pacific Ave. 46°52′34″N 97°47′03″W	Fargo	Demolished on April 25, 1991.
3	Fargo and Southern Depot		April 14, 1975 (#75001303)	May 27, 1980	1101 2nd Ave. N.	Fargo	Destroyed by fire on December 23, 1974.
4	Gethsemane Episcopal Cathedral	Gethsemane Episcopal Cathedral	February 19, 1980 (#80002909)	February 25, 1991	204 S. 9th St.	Fargo	Destroyed by fire on September 12, 1989.
5	Great Northern Freight Warehouse	Great Northern Freight Warehouse	November 21, 1990 (#90001749)	December 31, 2025	420 North 7th Street; 46°52′52″N 96°47′28″W	Fargo	
6	Chesebro Smith House		1986 (#86003744)	September 23, 2004	1337 Broadway	Fargo	Demolished on May 17, 2003.

== See also ==
- Elliot-Powers House and Garage, Fargo, eligible but not listed
- List of National Historic Landmarks in North Dakota
- National Register of Historic Places listings in North Dakota
