= Sprunk =

Sprunk may refer to:

- Jon Sprunk (fl. 1992), American fantasy author
- Sprunk (Grand Theft Auto: San Andreas), a fictional drink in the Grand Theft Auto video game series
- Sprunk Site, a Native American archaeological site near Enderlin, North Dakota
