= List of flax diseases =

This article is a list of diseases of flax (Linum usitatissimum and other Linum spp.).

== Fungal diseases ==
Fungal diseases
Anthracnose	Colletotrichum lini
Basal stem blight	Phoma spp. Phoma exigua var. linicola
Brown stem blight	Alternaria linicola
Browning (and) stem break	Aureobasidium lini Guignardia fulvida [teleomorph]
Damping-off, root rot, and seedling blight	Alternaria spp. Colletotrichum lini Fusarium spp. Pythium spp. Rhizoctonia solani Thanatephorus cucumeris [teleomorph] Thielaviopsis basicola Chalara elegans [synanamorph]
Dieback	Selenophoma linicola
Pasmo	Septoria linicola Mycosphaerella linicola [teleomorph]
Rust	Melampsora lini = Melampsora lini var. lini
Stem mold & rot	Sclerotinia sclerotiorum
Wilt	Fusarium oxysporum f.sp. lini

== Virus and phytoplasma diseases ==
Virus and mycoplasmalike organism (MLO) diseases
Aster yellows	Phytoplasma
Crinkle	Oat blue dwarf virus

== Miscellaneous diseases or disorders ==
Miscellaneous diseases or disorders
Boll blight	Extreme high temperatures
Chlorosis	Alkaline and very wet soils; mineral deficiencies; herbicide damage
Extreme high or low temperatures cause cankers at soil level
Stem twisting and bending	Herbicide damage and soil and temperature conditions

== See also ==
- Teleomorph, anamorph and holomorph
