= Henry Luke Bolley =

American botanist and college athlete (1865–1956)

Biographical details
- Born: February 1, 1865; Manchester, Indiana, U.S.
- Died: November 9, 1956 (aged 91); Minneapolis, Minnesota, U.S.

Playing career
- 1887: Purdue
- Position: Quarterback

Coaching career (HC unless noted)
- 1894–1899: North Dakota Agricultural

Head coaching record
- Overall: 7–8–1

Henry Luke Bolley (February 1, 1865 – November 9, 1956) was an American botanist and plant pathologist known for his work that led to the control or eradication of several major crop diseases. He was also a pioneering college football player and coach.

== Early life and education ==
Bolley was raised on a farm near Lawrenceburg, Indiana. He attended Purdue University, where he played varsity baseball and tennis. In 1887, he organized the first American football team at Purdue, and played quarterback in the team's first game against DePauw University. Bolley graduated in 1888, and remained at Purdue as a botanist while earning a master's degree in 1889.

== Plant pathology work ==
In 1890, Bolley was one of the first three faculty members hired at the newly founded North Dakota Agricultural College (NDAC), later North Dakota State University. In his first year at NDAC, he isolated the organism responsible for potato scab and developed an effective treatment. In 1893, he discovered a method of treating smut with formaldehyde. Much of his work, however, focused on the causes of flax wilt. At the time, it was believed that wilt was caused by "flax-sick" or deficient soil. Bolley established that wilt was in fact the result of the soilborne fungus Fusarium oxysporum. His breeding work led to the development of the resistant strain "Bison Flax", which was planted widely and made North Dakota one of the world's major flax-producing regions.

Bolley then turned his attention to stem rust, a wheat disease. He discovered that the rust spores bred not on wheat plants, but on the common barberry, a native shrub often found near wheat fields. He was author of the North Dakota Pure Seed Law of 1908. In 1916–1917, he authored and obtained passage of a state law creating a barberry eradication program. Bolley served as North Dakota state seed commissioner from 1909 to 1929.

== Football coaching ==
In 1890, Bolley challenged the University of North Dakota to a football match, but did not have enough players to field an NDAC team until 1894. In that year, Bolley's "Farmers" (not "Bison" until 1922) defeated the UND football squad twice, 20–4 and 22–4, starting a rivalry which continues today. Bolley coached football at NDAC until 1899.

== Later life and honors ==
Bolley was a member of many academic organizations including the American Botanical Society and the American Association for the Advancement of Science. He received honorary doctorates from Purdue in 1938 and NDAC in 1939. He retired from teaching in 1945 and died in 1956 at age 91. He was buried in Fargo, North Dakota.

A $78 million agricultural research laboratory named in Bolley's honor was opened at North Dakota State University in August 2026.

Research Plot 30 at North Dakota State University, the site of Bolley's research on flax pathogens, is listed on the National Register of Historic Places.

== Head coaching record ==
Year	Team	Overall	Conference	Standing	Bowl/playoffs
North Dakota Agricultural Aggies (Independent) (1894–1899)
1894	North Dakota Agricultural	2–0			
1895	North Dakota Agricultural	1–1			
1896	North Dakota Agricultural	3–1–1			
1897	North Dakota Agricultural	0–3			
1898	North Dakota Agricultural	1–2			
1899	North Dakota Agricultural	0–1			
North Dakota Agricultural:		7–8–1			
Total:		7–8–1			
