= Research Plot 30 =

- U.S. National Register of Historic Places
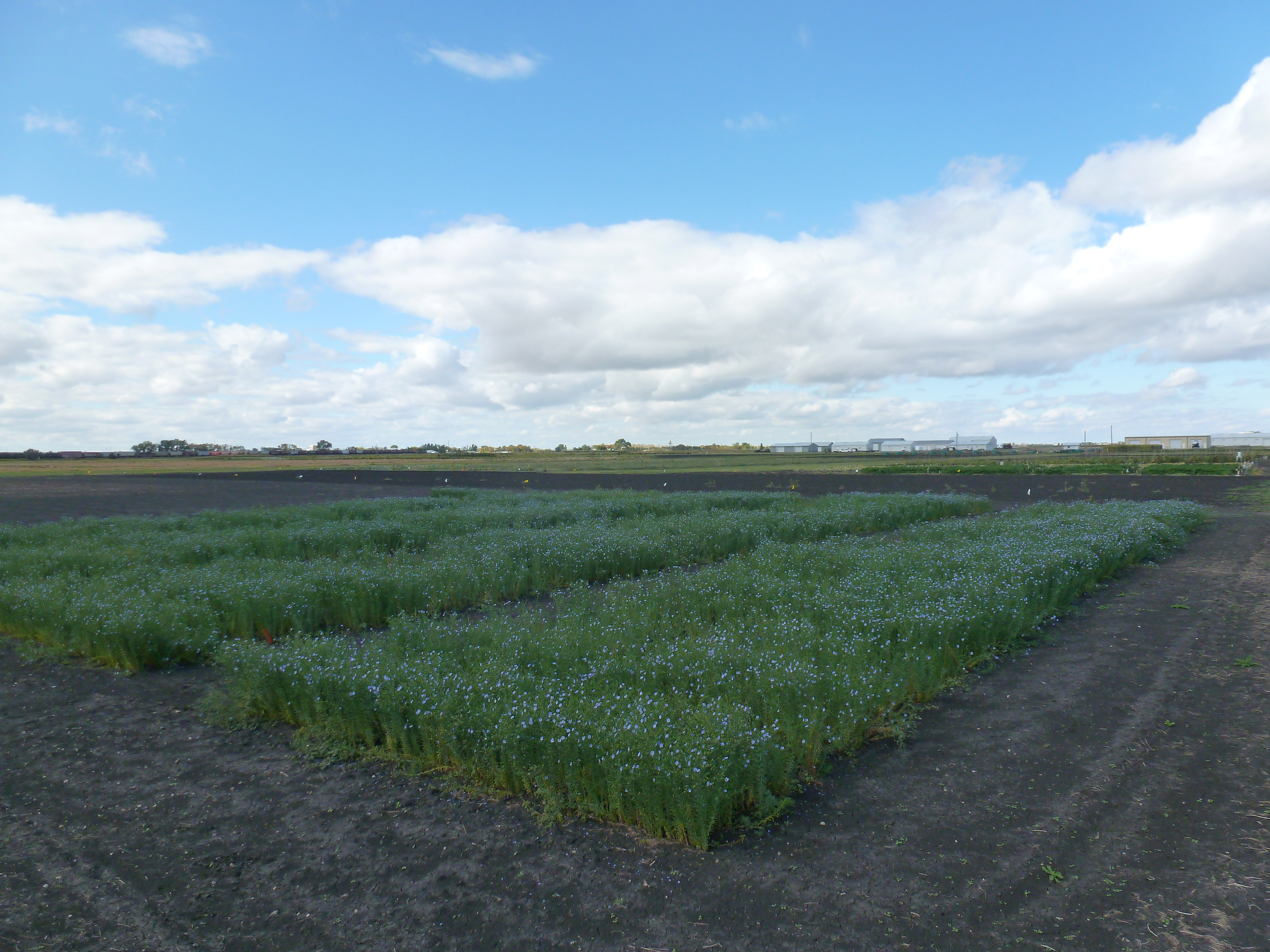
- Location: Near jct. of Centennial Ave. and 18th St. N., North Dakota State University campus, Fargo, North Dakota
- Area: 1 acre (0.40 ha)
- Built: 1894
- NRHP reference No.: 91001475
- Added to NRHP: October 8, 1991

Research Plot 30, is a historic agriculture site on the North Dakota State University campus in Fargo, North Dakota. When the pioneers broke up the grass prairie sod, flax was usually one of the first crops sown. If flax was sown continuously or with short rotations between subsequent flax crops, the flax became diseased and was called "flax sick" by farmers. The symptoms were wilting and dying flax plants during the growing season. The site is located near Centennial Avenue and 18th Street North. Flax was first planted at the site in 1894 by Professor Henry L. Bolley, a noted researcher in flax botany. By 1900, the flax plants were dead or dying. Bolley identified flax pathogens introduced by the plants themselves as the cause, and further identified resistant plants. Flax breeding programs from all over the world have sent material to NDSU to be tested for resistance to flax wilt in Plot 30.

The site was listed on the National Register of Historic Places in 1991. At the time of the nomination, the site had been cultivated in flax for nearly a century.

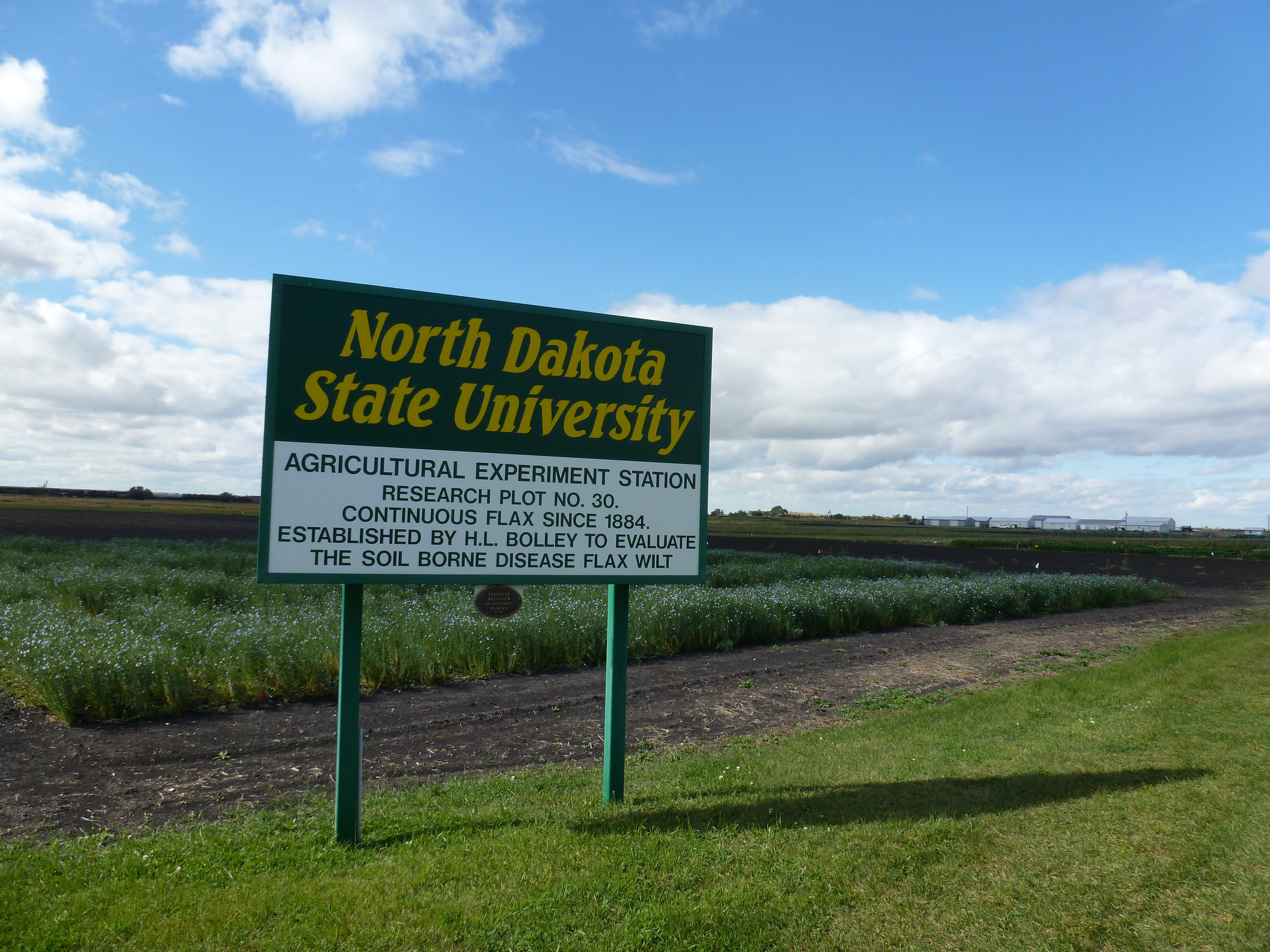
Sign at the plot

== See also ==
- Research Plot 2, also NRHP-listed, nearby, famous as site of wheat research
- Beatrice Willard Alpine Tundra Research Plots, Estes Park, Colorado, NRHP-listed
