= Kabatiella berberidis =

Scientific classification
- Domain: Eukaryota
- Kingdom: Fungi
- Division: Ascomycota
- Class: Dothideomycetes
- Order: Dothideales
- Family: Saccotheciaceae
- Genus: Kabatiella
- Species: K. berberidis

Binomial name
- Kabatiella berberidis (Cooke) C.G.Shaw & Arx

Synonyms
- Gloeosporium berberidis Cooke, 1885

Species of fungus

Kabatiella berberidis is a species of fungus belonging to the family Saccotheciaceae.
