= Elizabeth Wright Ingraham =

American architect

- Born: Elizabeth Wright; 1922; Oak Park, Illinois, U.S.
- Died: September 15, 2013 (aged 91); San Antonio, Texas, U.S.
- Education: Armour Institute; University of California, Berkeley
- Occupation: Architect
- Spouse: Gordon Ingraham
- Children: 4
- Parent(s): John Lloyd Wright; Hazel Lundin Wright
- Awards: Colorado Women's Hall of Fame (2014)

Elizabeth Wright Ingraham (1922 – September 15, 2013) was an American architect, educator, and author. She established an architect's practice in Colorado Springs, Colorado, with her husband, Gordon Ingraham, which adhered to her grandfather, Frank Lloyd Wright's, architectural styles. In 1970, she formed her own architectural firm, Elizabeth Wright Ingraham and Associates, which she led until her retirement in 2007. She is credited with the design of approximately 150 buildings in Colorado Springs and other western cities. She also founded and directed the Wright-Ingraham Institute, which invites students and visiting faculty to conferences and workshops on environmental issues. Wright also co-founded the Women's Forum in Colorado, a group for networking and social gatherings. She was posthumously inducted into the Colorado Women's Hall of Fame in 2014.

== Early life and education ==
Elizabeth Wright was born in 1922 in Oak Park, Illinois, to John Lloyd Wright, architect and the inventor of Lincoln Logs, and his second wife Hazel (nee Lundin). She was the granddaughter of American architect Frank Lloyd Wright, under whose tutelage she studied at his Taliesin studio at age 15.

She decided to pursue a career in architecture at age 14. The following year, she studied at her grandfather's studio, Taliesin, under his tutelage. She went on to study architecture under Ludwig Mies van der Rohe at the Armour Institute in Chicago, being one of three female students, and also took courses at the University of California, Berkeley.

Louis Gordon Ingraham, her eventual husband, was a fellow apprentice at the Taliesin, after their studies, they married and later settled in Colorado in the late forties to early fifties.

She was also a draftsman for the United States Navy in World War II.

She gained her architect's license in Illinois in 1947 after moving back to Chicago post-marriage.

== Career ==
In 1948, she and her husband, Gordon Ingraham, also an architect, moved to Colorado Springs, Colorado, to establish their own practice, Ingraham & Ingraham. They chose the city for its design opportunities and dearth of competition. As architects they adhered to Frank Lloyd Wright's Usonian and Prairie styles, producing "modest homes affordable to the upper middle class". Their partnership produced more than 90 home designs in the 1950s, including the Beadles House in Colorado Springs. They also designed one home in North Dakota (the George and Beth Anderson House, entered into the National Register of Historic Places in 2017), and two homes in Minnesota.. Ingraham designed several buildings in nearby Pueblo, Colorado including First Unitarian Society (originally Unitarian Fellowship) at 110 Calla Ave., built 1961-62. The building features berms on three and a half sides of the exterior for energy efficiency and to harmonize with the southwest landscape. The structure has no windows but features multiple skylights, which originally provided light for its indoor garden, which was removed around the year 2000. Another client of hers in Pueblo was the former Christ Congregational Church on Liberty Ln. in the Belmont neighborhood. She designed a home on 7th Avenue at the top of the hill overlooking the Colorado Mental Health Hospital in Pueblo. That structure features a large skylight with a large tree-sized bougainvillea in the middle of the living room.

By 1974 the couple divorced, and Elizabeth Wright Ingraham wanted to move away from her grandfather's styles and develop new architectural approaches. That year she founded her own firm, which she called Elizabeth Wright Ingraham and Associates. She went on to design approximately 150 buildings in Colorado Springs, including the Vista Grande Community Church (1987), an expansion of the Fountain Branch of the El Paso Country Library (2006), an upper story addition to the All Souls Unitarian Church, and the Solaz, La Casa, Kaleidoscope, Beadles, and Vradenburg private homes. It was said that her favorite projects to work on were public buildings intended for the community, showcasing her belief that architects could serve as contributors to society. Wright Ingraham worked until her retirement at the age of 85.

=== Architectural style ===
Architecture is a message a civilization leaves about itself to the future.

— Elizabeth Wright Ingraham

Following her grandfather's lead, Wright Ingraham designed homes that had "low-slung" exteriors, integrated into the landscape, incorporated natural light, used organic building materials, and offered exceptional outdoor views. Her design for the Vista Grande Community Church used an "energy-efficient, easy-to-maintain, insulated concrete called Thermomass", being one of the first buildings in the country to do so. Her plan for the Kaleidoscope house included a 100-foot (30 m) skylight.

Her architectural style followed a post-modernism look that was accompanied with a relationship to the environment. Said to be inspired by the Rocky Mountain landscape, her work embodied the Usonian style elements with a larger focus on the preservation of the natural landscape around her. Her work was described as 'environmental architecture' Wrights main drive during her career was establishing a connection to society and the community through the contributions she was making as an architect. Solidifying her environmental priority stance, the Wright-Ingraham institute was founded. In a 1951 home she designed for photographer Myron Wood, her style was described as, "marrying human habitation and the natural world with its stone and wood interiors."

Sustainability measures shown on the forefront much of her work included block construction, solar-energy, thermomass and pre-fabrication.

== Other activities ==
In 1970, the same year she founded her architectural practice, Wright Ingraham established the non-profit Wright-Ingraham Institute for the study of land use and natural resources. The institute invites students and visiting faculty to conferences and workshops on environmental issues. Wright Ingraham directed the institute for its first 20 years; it is now governed by a board that includes two of her daughters.

Wright Ingraham also founded Crossroads, an international exchange program affiliated with Colorado College, and was a cofounder of the Women's Forum of Colorado. She also engaged in community activism, at one point participating in a peace march in Colorado Springs.

== Affiliations and memberships ==
Wright Ingraham was a fellow of the American Institute of Architects and served as president of its Colorado chapter in 2002. She was a member of the State Board of Examiners of Architects (1980–1990) and the advisory board of the Frank Lloyd Wright Conservancy, among other advisory boards and task forces.

== Awards and honors ==
Wright Ingraham received an honorary doctorate from the University of Colorado in 1999.

Elizabeth also won a 1999 AIA Colorado Design Award for the Solaz house in Manitou Springs, Colorado.

She was posthumously inducted into the Colorado Women's Hall of Fame in 2014.

== Personal life ==
She met her husband, Louis Gordon Ingraham (1915–1999), while both were studying at Taliesin. The couple had one son, Michael Lloyd Ingraham, and three daughters, Catherine Ingraham, Christine Ingraham and Anna (Ingraham) Grady. They divorced in 1974. One daughter, Catherine Ingraham, became a professor of graduate architecture and urban planning at the Pratt Institute in New York. She is a visiting professor at Harvard University.

After residing in Colorado Springs for 65 years, Wright Ingraham moved to her son's home in San Antonio, Texas, in January 2013. She died of congestive heart failure on September 15, 2013, aged 91. Coincidentally, her grandfather Frank Lloyd Wright had died at the same age.
