= John Wall (North Dakota politician) =

American politician (1943–2014)

Member of the North Dakota House of Representatives
- In office 2004 – July 18, 2014

Personal details
- Born: December 14, 1943 Enderlin, North Dakota, U.S.
- Died: July 18, 2014 (aged 70) West Battle Lake, Minnesota, U.S.
- Party: Republican
- Education: Valley City State University; North Dakota State University
- Occupation: Politician, educator

John Wall (December 14, 1943 – July 18, 2014) was an American educator and politician in North Dakota.

Born in Enderlin, North Dakota, Wall operated the family farm. He then received his bachelor's degree in English and history from Valley City State University and his master's degree in English from North Dakota State University. He then taught English and journalism in high school. He lived in Wahpeton, North Dakota. In 2004, he retired from teaching and then served in the North Dakota House of Representatives, as a Republican, from 2004 until his death. He died at his family vacation home on West Battle Lake, Minnesota.
