= Research Plot 2 =

- U.S. National Register of Historic Places
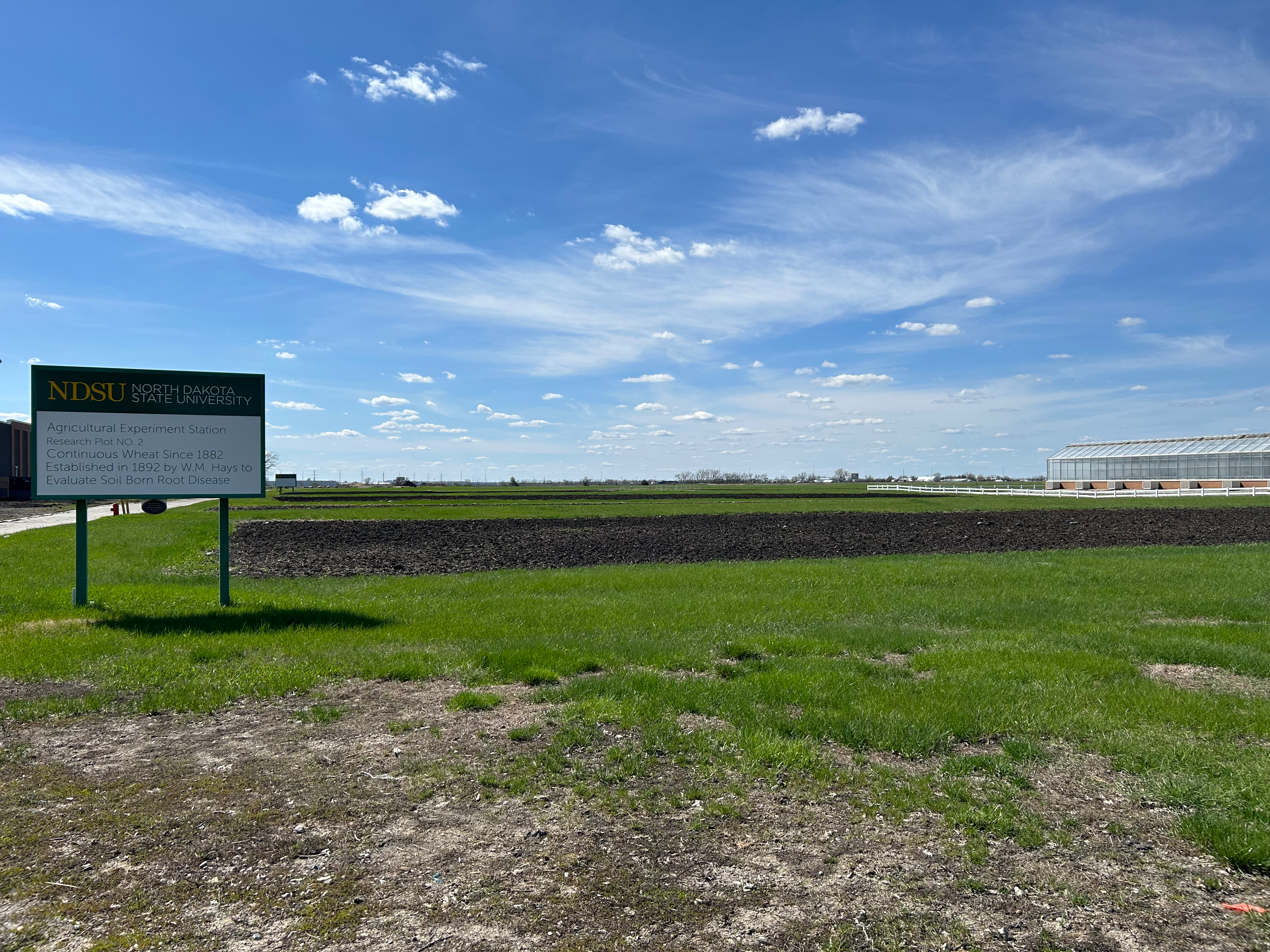
- Location: Near jct. of Centennial Ave. and 18th St. N., North Dakota State University campus, Fargo, North Dakota
- Area: less than one acre
- Built: 1882
- NRHP reference No.: 91001474
- Added to NRHP: October 8, 1991

Research Plot 2, located near Centennial Ave. and 18th St. N. on the North Dakota State University campus in Fargo, North Dakota. The plot was established in 1882 on land that was broken from native prairie sod. It has been sown to spring wheat continuously since that date. The plot was listed on the National Register of Historic Places in 1991 as Agricultural Research Site, but has historically been known as Research Plot 2.

The plot is known as the oldest continuously cultivated wheat field site used in research. It is valuable for its long history because its soil is then particularly "ripe" with soil pathogens relevant for testing new varieties of wheat. The Dalrymple Research Greenhouse and the Peltier Complex are located next to the site.

== See also ==
- Research Plot 30, also NRHP-listed, nearby, famous as site of flax research
- Beatrice Willard Alpine Tundra Research Plots, Estes Park, Colorado, NRHP-listed
