= Kabatiella caulivora =

Scientific classification
- Domain: Eukaryota
- Kingdom: Fungi
- Division: Ascomycota
- Class: Dothideomycetes
- Order: Dothideales
- Family: Saccotheciaceae
- Genus: Kabatiella
- Species: K. caulivora

Binomial name
- Kabatiella caulivora (Kirchn.) Karak. (1923)

Synonyms
- Gloeosporium caulivorum Kirchn. (1902); Exobasidiopsis caulivora (Kirschst.) Karak. (1922); Aureobasidium caulivorum (Kirchn.) W.B.Cooke (1962)

Species of fungus

Kabatiella caulivora is fungus in the family Saccotheciaceae. It is a plant pathogen infecting red clover.
