= Watts Free Library =

- U.S. National Register of Historic Places
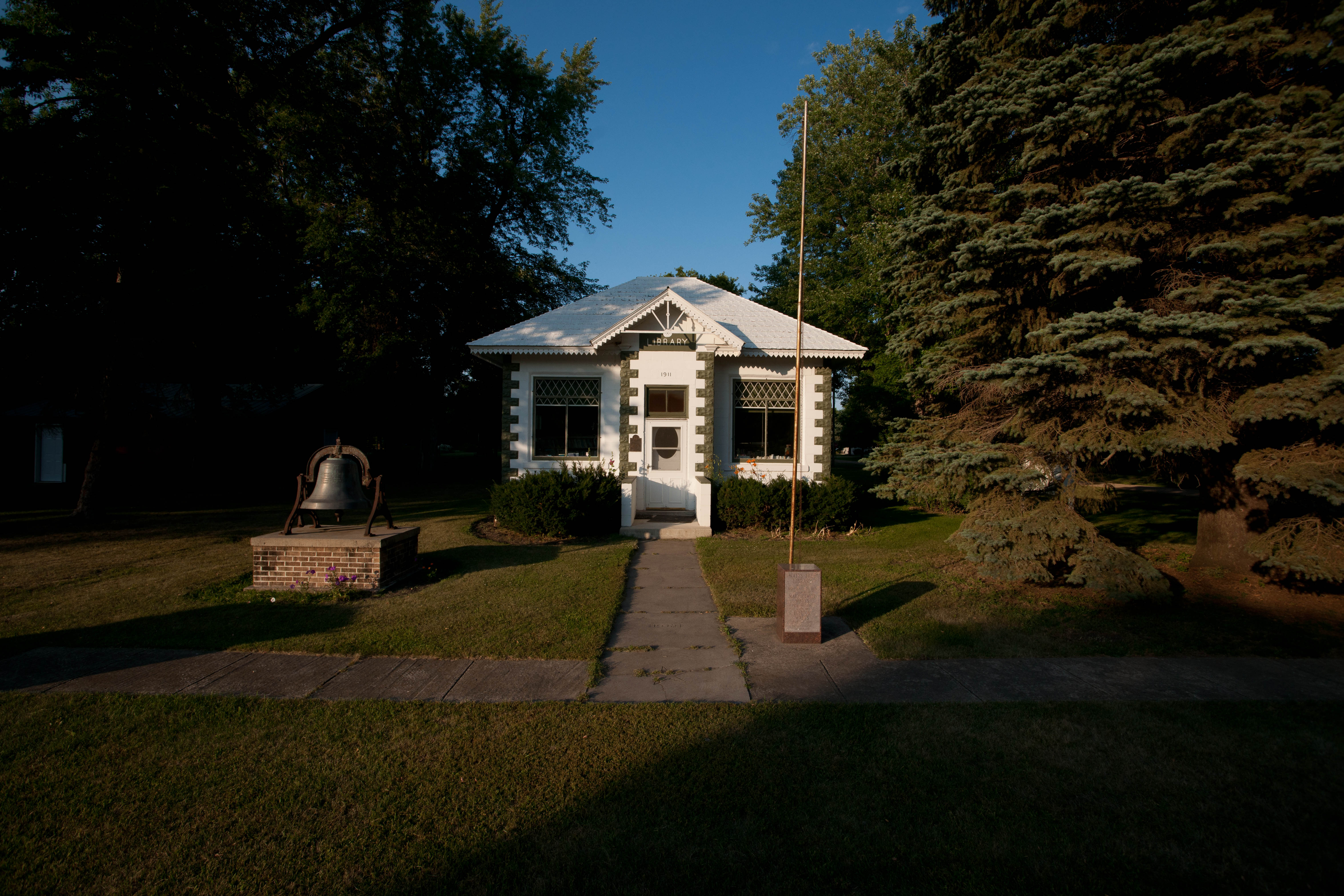
- Library in 2009

- Location within North Dakota Location within the United States
- Location: 101 3rd St. N., Leonard, North Dakota
- Coordinates: 46°39′12″N 97°14′45″W
- Area: less than one acre
- Built: 1911
- Architectural style: Stick/Eastlake
- MPS: Philanthropically Established Libraries in North Dakota MPS
- NRHP reference No.: 89002304
- Added to NRHP: May 31, 1990

The Watts Free Library is a historic library located on Third Street in Leonard, North Dakota. It was built in 1911 and dedicated in 1913 with funding from Edgerton Watts. The building includes Stick/Eastlake architecture. The library was closed in 1968 but reopened in 1972. It was listed on the National Register of Historic Places in 1990.

It was the first township library, and perhaps the smallest library, and in perhaps the smallest community to have a library, in the state of North Dakota.
