= Kabatiella =

Scientific classification
- Kingdom: Fungi
- Division: Ascomycota
- Class: Dothideomycetes
- Order: Dothideales
- Family: Saccotheciaceae
- Genus: Kabatiella; Bubák (1907)

Type species
- Kabatiella microsticta Bubák (1907)

Synonyms
- Exobasidiopsis Karak. (1907)

Genus of fungi in the family Saccotheciaceae

Kabatiella is a genus of fungi belonging to the family Saccotheciaceae.

The genus was circumscribed by Czech mycologist František Bubák in 1907.

The genus name of Kabatiella is in honour of Josef Emanuel Kabát (1849 - 1925), who was a Czech botanist (studying Lichenology and Mycology).

== Species ==
- Kabatiella apocrypta (Ellis and Everh.)
- Kabatiella babajaniae Negru (1960)
- Kabatiella berberidis (Cooke) C.G.Shaw & Arx (1963)
- Kabatiella borealis (Ellis & Everh.) Arx (1957)
- Kabatiella bubakiana Moesz (1938)
- Kabatiella bupleuri Bills (2012)
- Kabatiella caulivora (Kirchn.) Karak. (1923)
- Kabatiella emblicae Chuan F.Zhang & P.K.Chi (1997)
- Kabatiella gleditschiae Negru (1960)
- Kabatiella lini (Laff.) Karak. (1957)
- Kabatiella microstromoides (Moesz) Karak. (1957)
- Kabatiella nigricans (G.F.Atk. & Edgerton) Karak. (1923)
- Kabatiella nigricola Lebezh. (1959)
- Kabatiella platani (Eddelb. & Engelke) Karak. (1950)
- Kabatiella polyspora (Bubák & Syd.) Karak. (1923)
- Kabatiella silenicola Annal. (1972)
- Kabatiella superficialis Rudakov (1963)
- Kabatiella tilletioides (Werderm.) Karak. (1950)
- Kabatiella tubercularioides (Sacc.) Moesz (1918)
- Kabatiella zeae Narita & Y.Hirats. (1959)
