= Sprunk Site (32CS04478) =

Native American archaeological site near Enderlin, North Dakota

- U.S. National Register of Historic Places
- Nearest city: Enderlin, North Dakota
- Area: 1 acre (0.40 ha)
- Built: 1450
- NRHP reference No.: 06001226
- Added to NRHP: January 9, 2007

The Sprunk Site (32CS04478) is a Native American archeological site that was formerly the site of a village or hamlet near Enderlin, North Dakota. The village was located on a steep bluff overlooking the Maple River floodplain with the remaining borders protected by encircling ditches. Two earthen burial mounds have been discovered at the site. The site was the subject of a 1982 preliminary report by Michael Michlovic and later study by Kelsey M. Lowe and Aaron S. Fogel. It was listed on the National Register of Historic Places in 2007.
