= Fargo South Residential District =

Historic district in North Dakota, United States

- U.S. National Register of Historic Places
- U.S. Historic district
- Location within North Dakota Location within the United States
- Location: Roughly bounded by 5th and 17th Aves. S., 7th and 9th Sts. S., Fargo, North Dakota
- Coordinates: 46°51′43″N 96°47′30″W
- Area: 82.3 acres (33.3 ha)
- Built: 1884
- Architect: Multiple
- Architectural style: Late 19th and 20th Century Revivals; Late Victorian architecture
- NRHP reference No.: 83001929
- Added to NRHP: September 19, 1983

Fargo South Residential District is an 82.3-acre (33.3 ha) historic district in Fargo, North Dakota that was listed on the National Register of Historic Places in 1983.

It dates from 1884 and includes Late 19th and 20th Century Revivals architecture and Late Victorian architecture.

The listing included 260 contributing buildings.

Fifty houses in the district are in the Arts and Crafts movement's English Cottage style.
