= Barrington Apartments =

- U.S. National Register of Historic Places
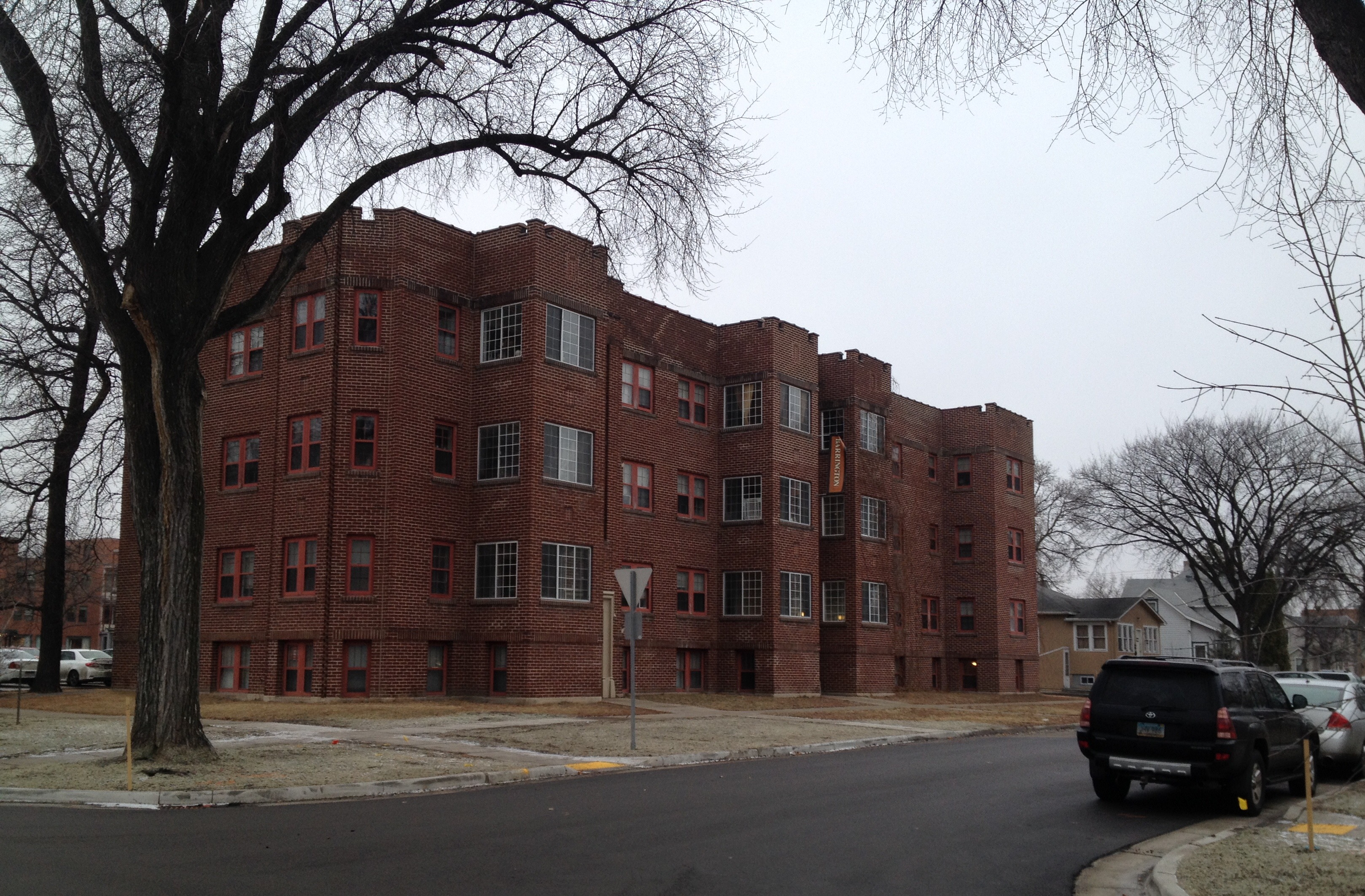

- Location within North Dakota Location within the United States
- Location: 219 Twelfth St., S, Fargo, North Dakota
- Coordinates: 46°52′19″N 96°47′51″W
- Area: less than 1 acre (0.40 ha)
- Built: 1923
- Architect: Rosatti, Joseph E.; Anderson & Olson
- Architectural style: Tudor Revival, Elizabethan Revival
- NRHP reference No.: 88000982
- Added to NRHP: July 27, 1989

Barrington Apartments is a property in Fargo, North Dakota that was listed on the National Register of Historic Places in 1989.

It was built in 1923 in Tudor Revival and Elizabethan Revival style, and was designed by Joseph E. Rosatti and built by Anderson & Olson.

The listing included one contributing building on a property of less than 1 acre (0.40 ha).

It has a crenelated parapet. "Complex brick patterns and the raked velour dark red brick further the romantic feeling."
