= DeLendrecie's Department Store =

- deLendrecie's Department Store
- U.S. National Register of Historic Places
- U.S. Historic district – Contributing property
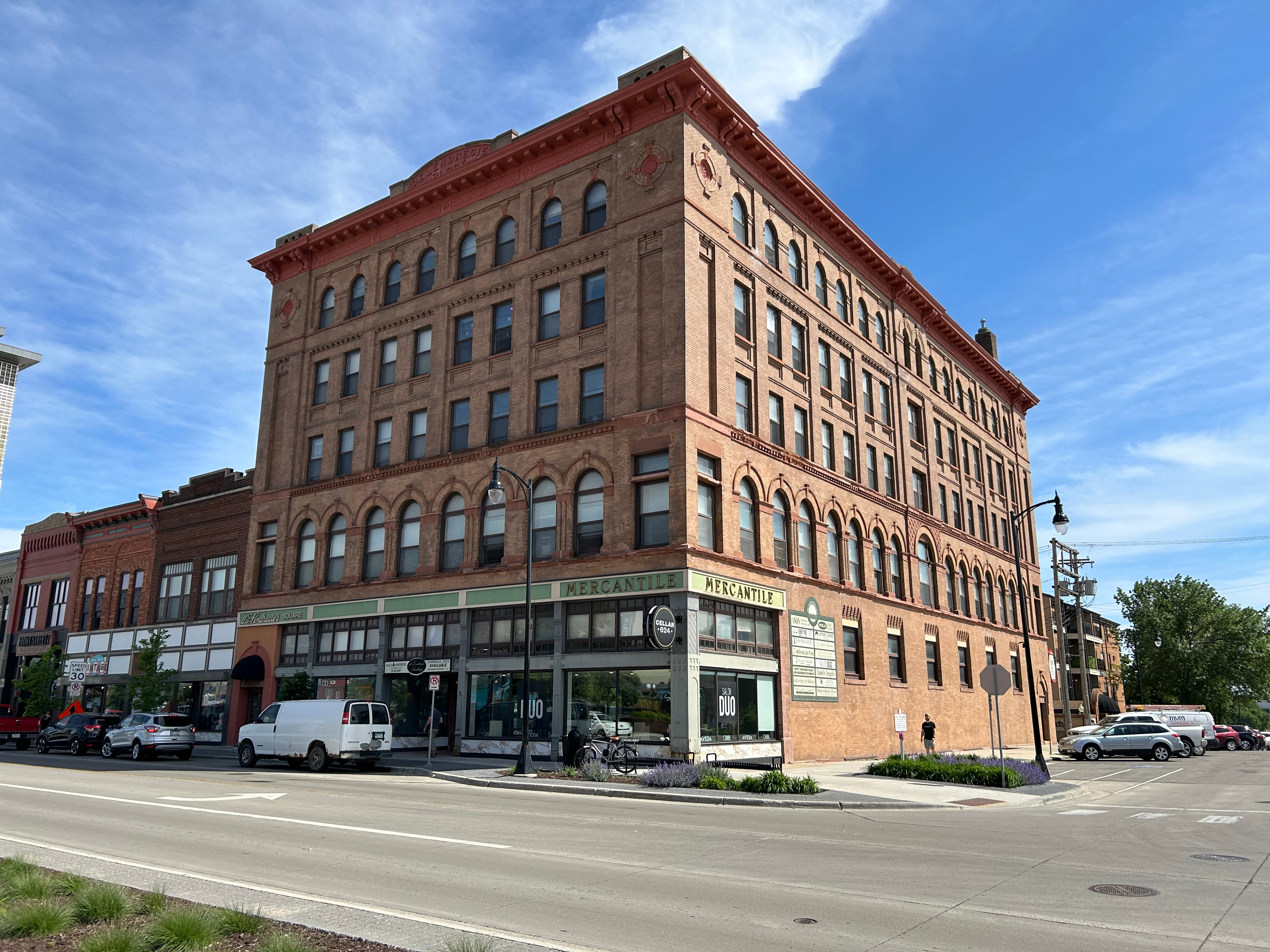

- Location within North Dakota Location within the United States
- Location: 620-624 Main Ave., Fargo, North Dakota
- Coordinates: 46°52′27″N 96°47′20″W
- Area: less than 1 acre (0.40 ha)
- Built: 1894 and 1904
- Architect: McMillen & Tenbusch; Andrew J. O`Shea
- Architectural style: Late 19th and 20th Century Revivals, Richardsonian Classical
- Part of: Downtown Fargo District (ID83004064)
- NRHP reference No.: 79003725

Significant dates
- Added to NRHP: October 22, 1979
- Designated CP: October 13, 1983

deLendrecie's Department Store (de LAWN dreh see) was a department store located in Fargo, North Dakota.

The Original O.J. deLendecie Company building at 620 thru 624 Main Avenue in Fargo was listed on the National Register of Historic Places in 1979. In 1972 during development of the West Acres Mall, deLendrecie's moved its entire Fargo location to the newly built mall as its largest opening anchor tenant.

The department store offered mid-range dry goods, housewares, luxury personal items and imported luxury items from Europe. deLendrecie's was eventually sold to the Dillard's Department store company and later sold again to Herberger's Department Stores of St. Cloud, Minnesota.

The original O.J. deLendrecie Company building was built in 1894 in Late 19th and 20th Century Revivals and Richardsonian Classical style, and was designed by McMillen & Tenbusch (1894) and by Andrew J. O'Shea (1904 addition).

The original store was prominently located in downtown Fargo near the Northern Pacific Railroad Depot on Main Avenue. The building was expanded vertically in 1904 as deLendrecie changed the name of his store from The Chicago Dry Goods House to The O.J. deLendrecie Company.

The listing includes one contributing building on an area of less than 1 acre (0.40 ha).

deLendrecie's Department store was rebranded as a Herberger's in 1998 bringing almost 100 years of service to the Fargo/Moorhead area to a close.
