= Fargo City Detention Hospital =

- U.S. National Register of Historic Places
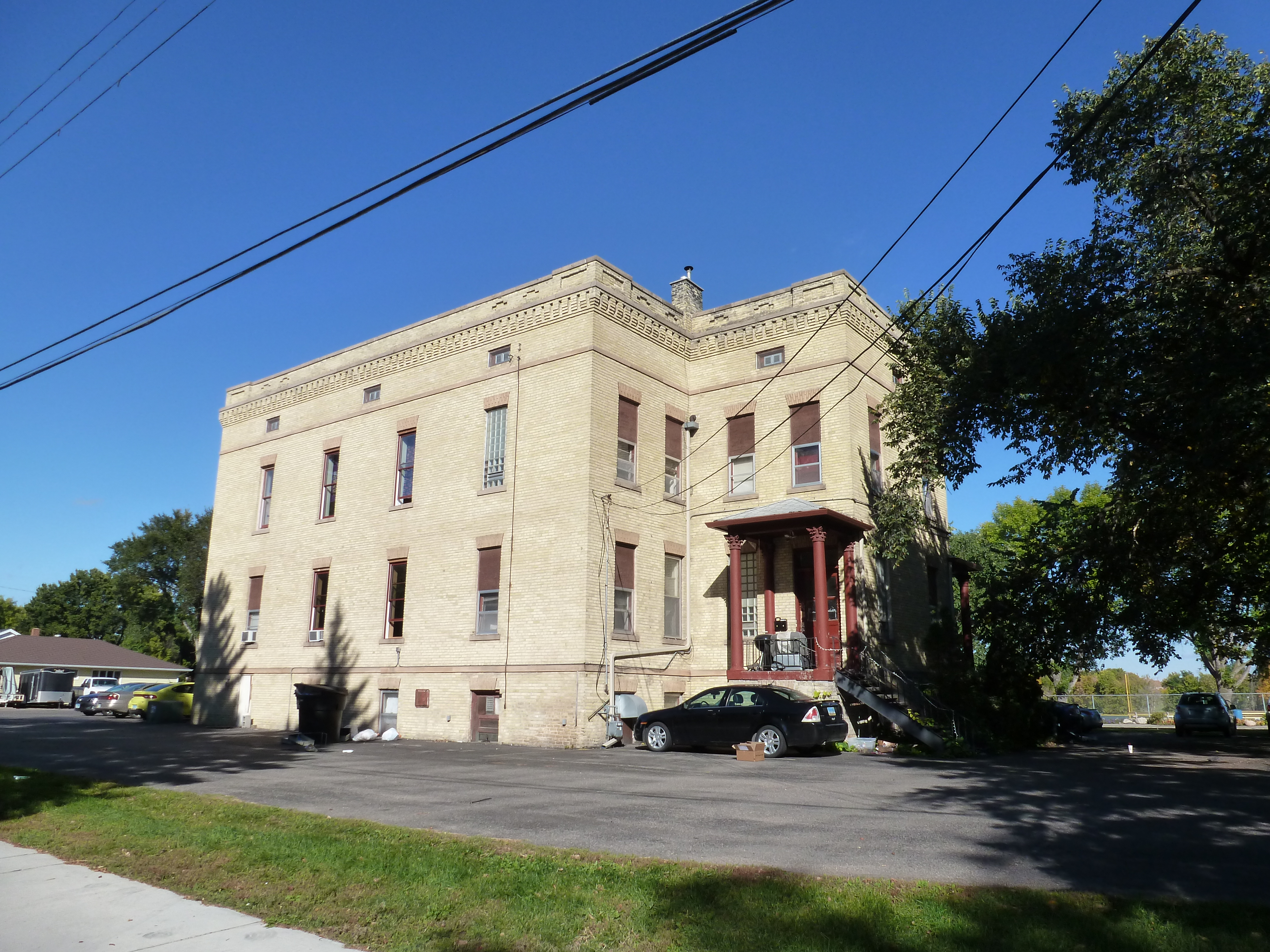

- Location within North Dakota Location within the United States
- Location: 57 Eleventh Ave. N, Fargo, North Dakota
- Coordinates: 46°53′21″N 96°46′37″W
- Area: less than 1 acre (0.40 ha)
- Built: 1910
- Architect: Frank Anders
- MPS: North Side Fargo MRA
- NRHP reference No.: 86003741
- Added to NRHP: April 7, 1987

Fargo City Detention Hospital is a building in Fargo, North Dakota, United States, that was built in 1910. The hospital was designed as a place to sequester people afflicted with contagious disease.

It's a two-story brick and tile building, designed by Frank Anders and built principally by C.H. Johnson. It had coal storage capacity of 40 tons.

It was listed on the National Register of Historic Places in 1987.

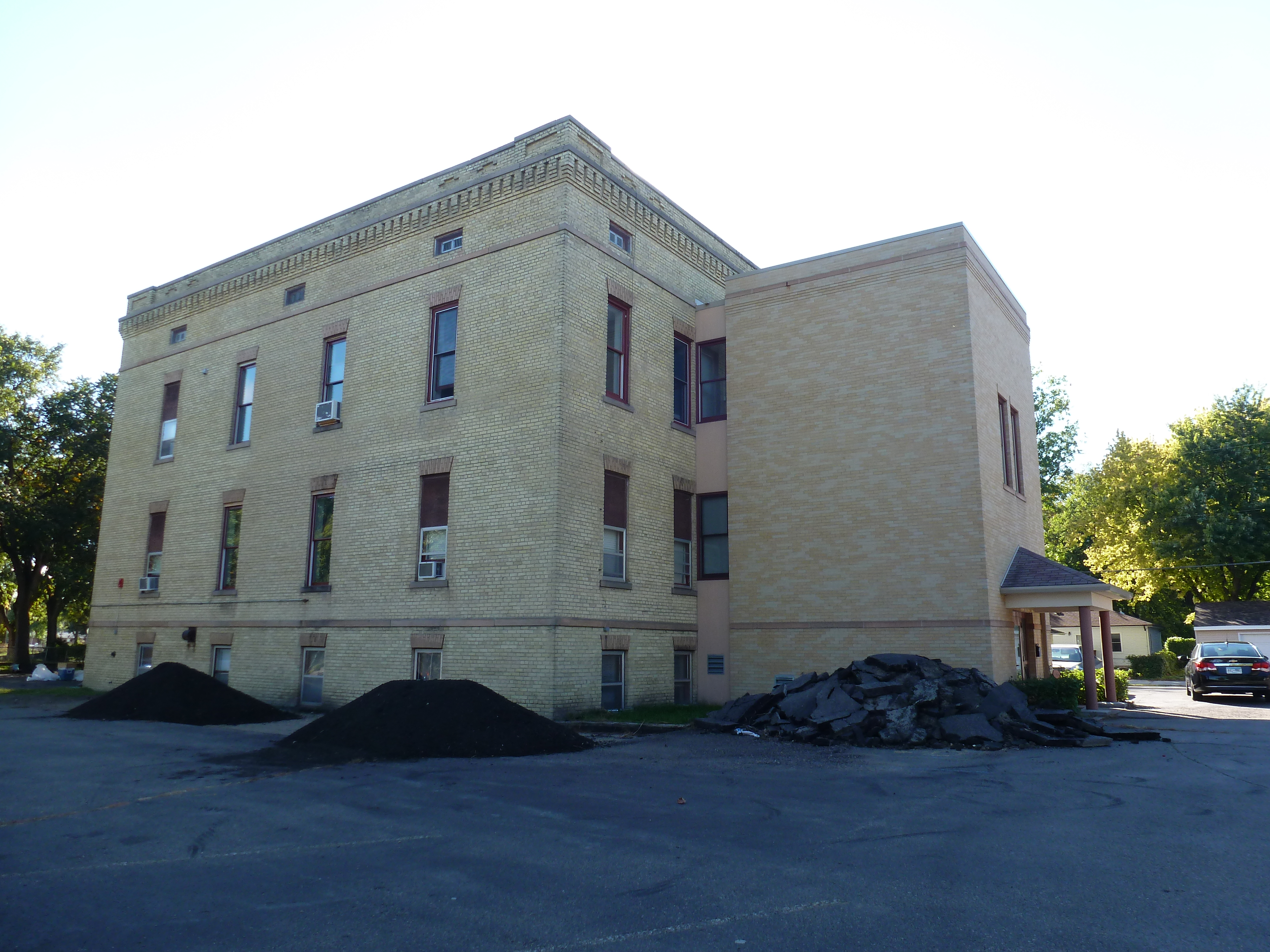
Fargo City Detention Hospital
