= Dibley House =

Historic house in North Dakota, United States

- U.S. National Register of Historic Places
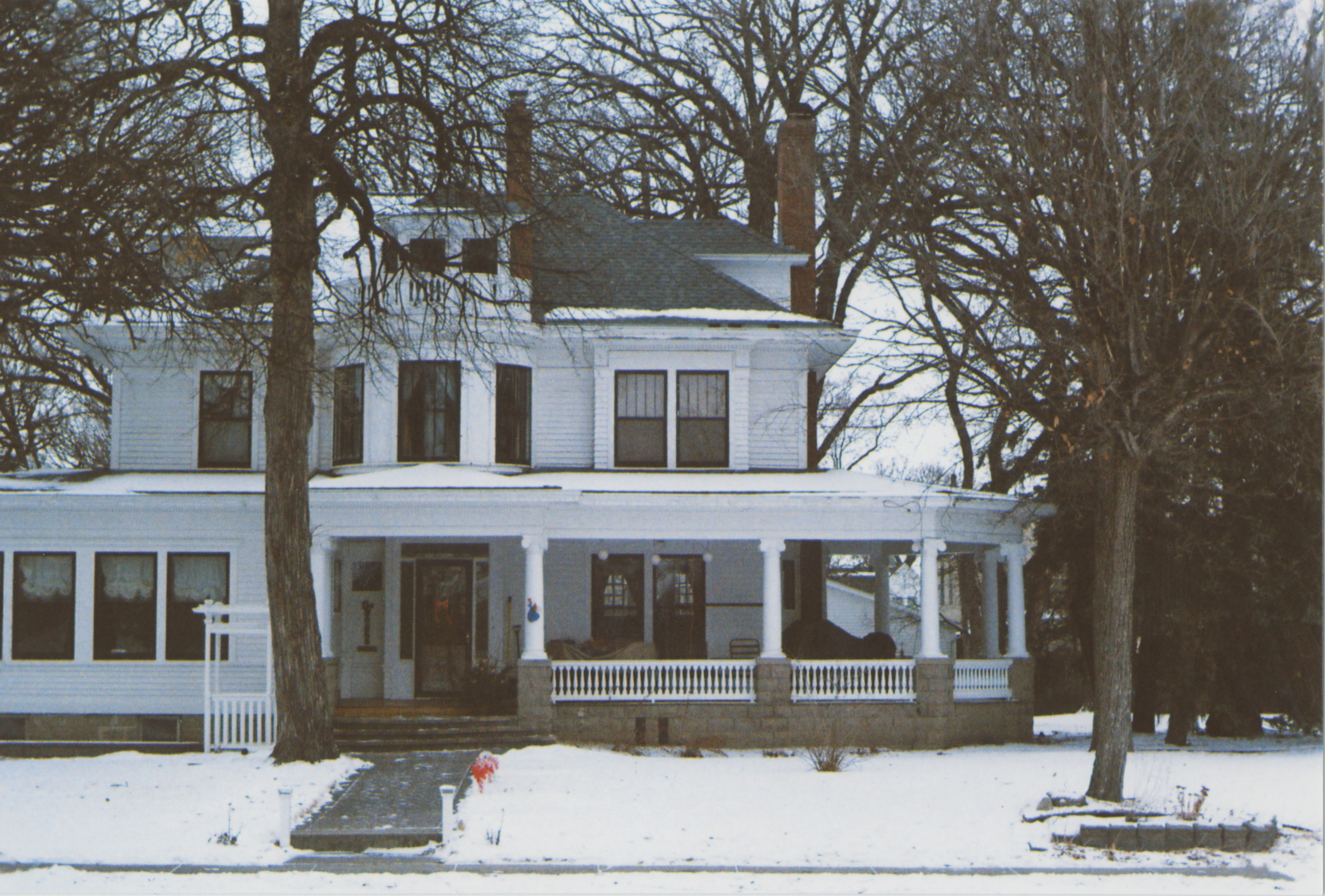

- Location within North Dakota Location within the United States
- Location: 331 8th Ave., S, Fargo, North Dakota
- Coordinates: 46°51′59″N 96°47′1″W
- Area: less than 1 acre (0.40 ha)
- Built: 1906
- Architectural style: Classical Revival
- NRHP reference No.: 80004282
- Added to NRHP: November 25, 1980

Dibley House, also known as Graf House, is a property in Fargo, North Dakota that was listed on the National Register of Historic Places in 1980. The listing included two contributing buildings on an area of less than 1 acre (0.40 ha). The listing included two contributing buildings on an area of less than 1 acre (0.40 ha).

== History ==
It was built in 1906 in Classical Revival architecture style. It was constructed for Francis E. Dibley (1860-1910) and his wife Ida Didley. Francis Dibley had been a representative of the Wisconsin Bridge and Iron Company. In 1898, Dibley and W.H. Robinson formed the bridge-building partnership of Dibley and Robinson, and actively began soliciting county bridge contracts throughout eastern North Dakota. In 1901, Robinson left the company, and Dibley reorganized the firm into the Fargo Bridge and Iron Company and served as president. In 1906, Dibley was elected as a member of the North Dakota House of Representatives.
