= Black Building (Fargo, North Dakota) =

- U.S. National Register of Historic Places
- U.S. Historic district – Contributing property
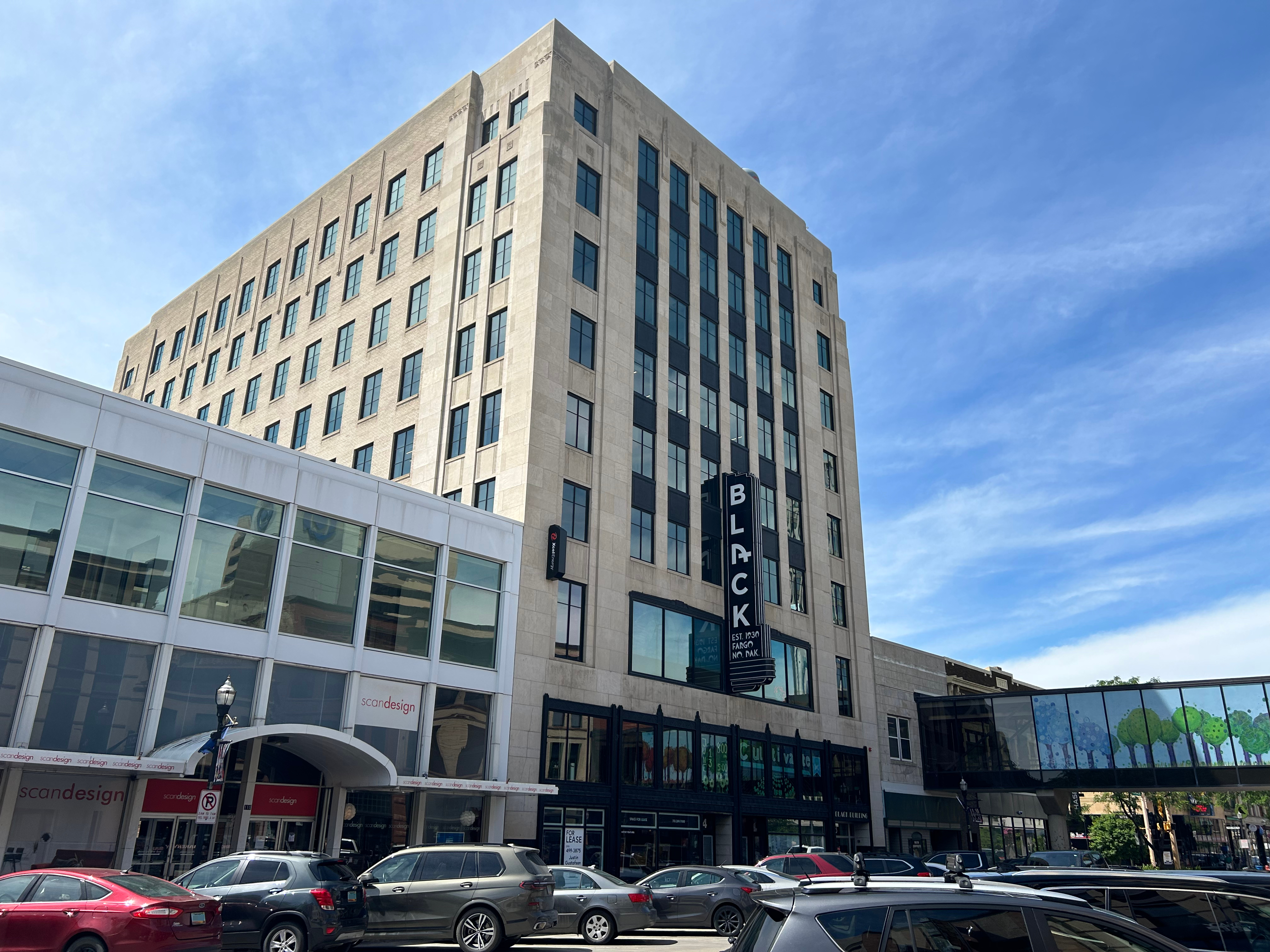

- Location within North Dakota Location within the United States
- Location: 114 Broadway N., Fargo, North Dakota
- Coordinates: 46.877588°N 96.788086°W
- Built: 1931; 95 years ago
- Architect: Lang, Raugland, and Lewis
- Architectural style: Art Moderne
- Part of: Downtown Fargo District (ID83004064)
- NRHP reference No.: 16000821

Significant dates
- Added to NRHP: December 2016
- Designated CP: October 13, 1983

The Black Building at 114-118 Broadway in Fargo, North Dakota was a "pivotal" historic resource in the Downtown Fargo District, in the listing of that historic district upon the National Register of Historic Places. In 2016 it was also individually listed on the National Register, as its "owners chose to pursue the honor of individual listing for its architecture and for its association with George Mumford Black and his strategies in commerce and communications. Black had the upper floor of the Art Moderne building designed for WDAY (AM) radio and ensured the station signed off each show with “this is WDAY with from the Black Building, Fargo” and he is credited with creating the one-cent sale."

== Architecture ==
The Black Building is in Art Moderne style. At eight stories tall, it was the tallest in the district. "Faced with Indiana limestone, it also deviates from the predominant brick in the district. The Black building was the work of Lang, Raugland, and Lewis of Minneapolis with Ole A. Braseth and S. Marius Houkom, consulting Fargo architects. Oscar Lang (1880-1960) and his partners designed the Art Moderne Greyhound bus depot (1936-7) in Minneapolis, the library at St. Olaf College in Northfield, Minnesota, and a series of churches, schools, and commercial buildings in Minnesota.*9 The Black building (#8) may have inspired the Art Moderne refacing and reconstruction by Braseth and Houkom in 1940 of two other buildings on Broadway: (#38) the Gate City Block at 71-3 and (#33) the building at 202-204 in warm cream-colored ashlar."

== History ==
George M. Black came to Fargo in 1912, and purchased 110, 112, and 114 Broadway. He ran The Black Store out of 112 Broadway until construction began on the Black Building, and the grand opening of the building took place in 1931. Black sold his store to Sears and Roebuck, who occupied the bottom two floors of the eight-storey building, and the rest of the building remained available for various businesses and offices, including WDAY Studios.

The building was purchased in 2015. There was a municipal bond issue failure associated with the building.
