= Fargo Oak Grove Residential Historic District =

Historic district in North Dakota, United States

- U.S. National Register of Historic Places
- U.S. Historic district
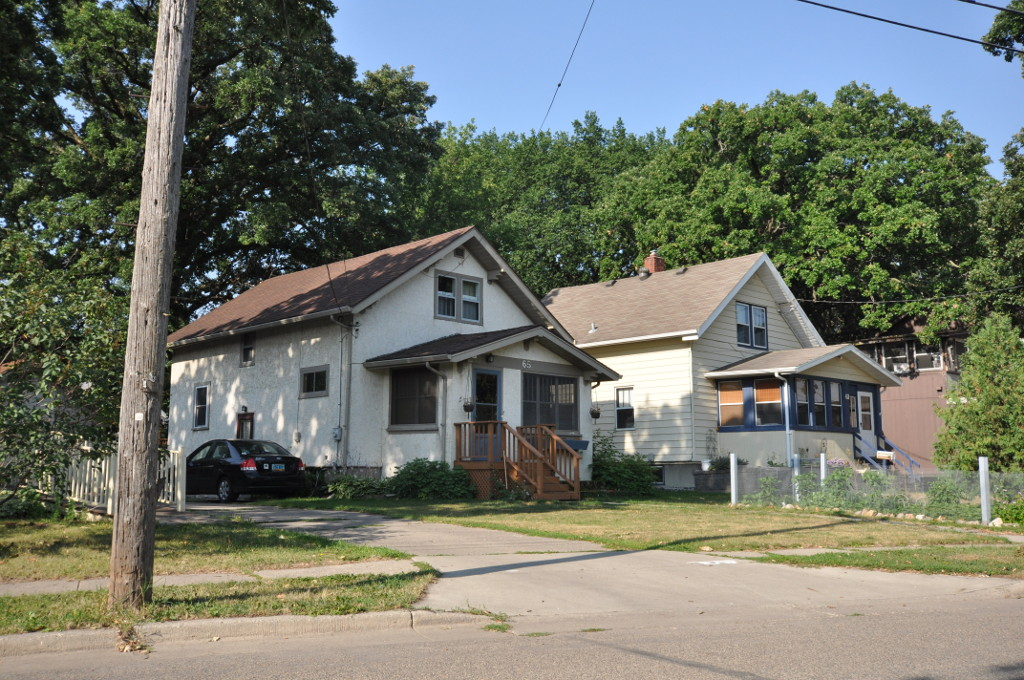

- Location within North Dakota Location within the United States
- Location: North & South Terrace Aves., east of Elm St., N., Fargo, North Dakota
- Coordinates: 46°53′0″N 96°46′34″W
- NRHP reference No.: 11000744
- Added to NRHP: October 13, 2011

The Fargo Oak Grove Residential Historic District is a historic district located around North and South Terrace Avenues near downtown Fargo, North Dakota. The homes date from the period 1895 to 1955 and include working-class, gable-fronted cottages and vernacular bungalows." The district was listed on the National Register of Historic Places in 2011.

According to the State Historical Society of North Dakota, the district "has a tangible cohesiveness in the scale, density, material character, and landscape treatment that unifies this neighborhood."

Most of the Oak Grove neighborhood was flooded with several feet of water from the Red River in the spring of 1997. The area was flooded again in the spring of 2009.
