= Downtown Fargo District =

- U.S. National Register of Historic Places
- U.S. Historic district
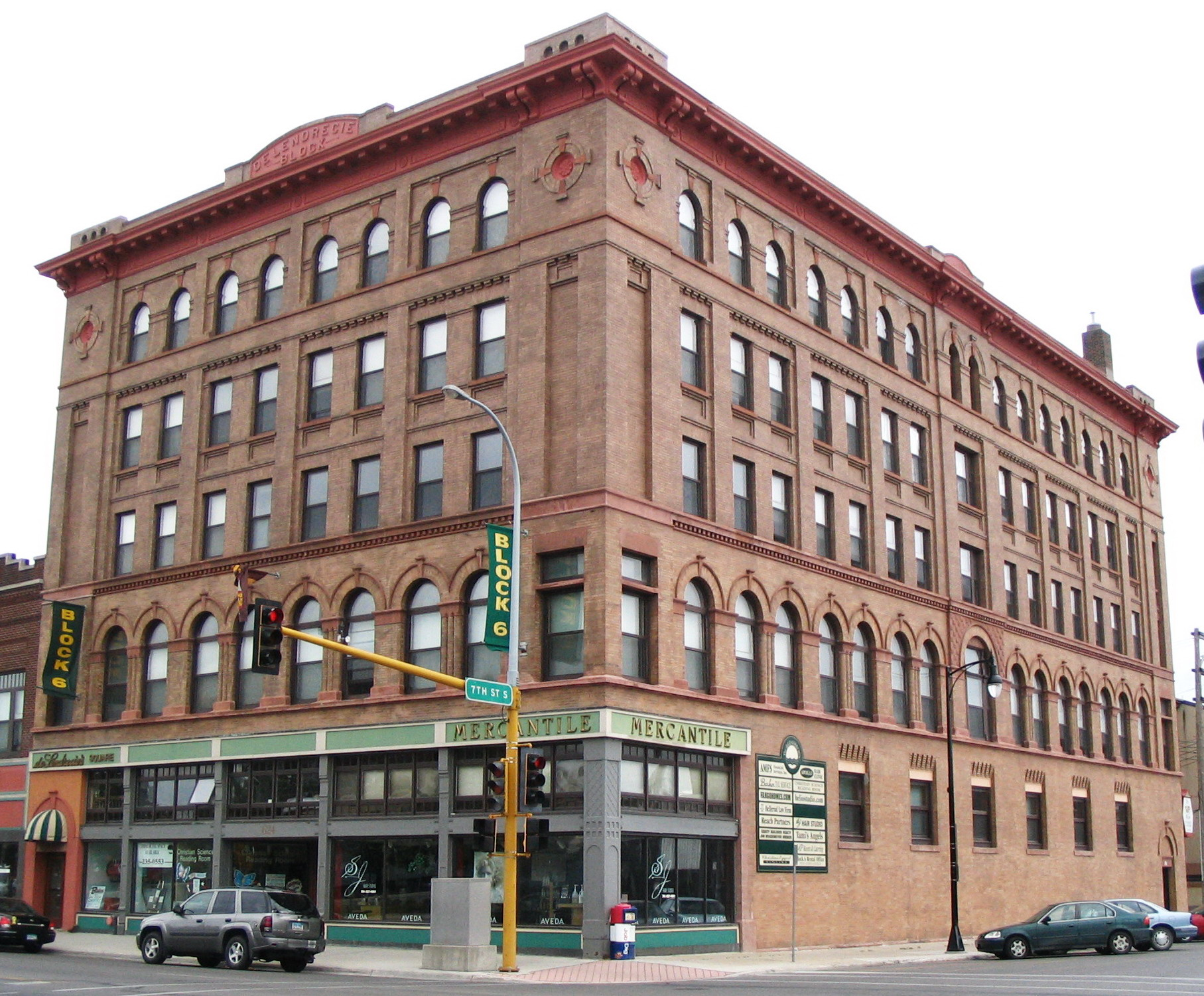
- deLendrecie's Department Store building in Downtown Fargo

- Location within North Dakota Location within the United States
- Location: Roughly Roberts St., from S. 1st Ave. to 5th Ave. N., and Main Ave., Fargo, North Dakota
- Coordinates: 46°52′41″N 96°47′24″W
- Area: 60 acres (24 ha)
- Architect: Multiple
- Architectural style: Late 19th and 20th Century Revivals, Moderne, Late Victorian
- NRHP reference No.: 83004064
- Added to NRHP: October 13, 1983

Downtown Fargo District, or Downtown Fargo Historic District, is a historic district in Fargo, North Dakota that was listed on the National Register of Historic Places in 1983.

The listing included 88 contributing buildings in an area of 60 acres (24 ha). It includes Late 19th and 20th Century Revivals architecture, Moderne architecture, and Late Victorian architecture.

The district includes the following properties that were already separately listed on the NRHP:

- Masonic Block, built 1884, 9-11 Eighth Street South
- deLendrecie's Department Store, built 1894 and 1904, 620-624 Main Avenue
- Northern Pacific Railway Depot, built 1898, 701 Main Avenue, designed by Cass Gilbert
- Grand Lodge of North Dakota, Ancient Order of United Workmen, built 1914, 112-114 Roberts St.
- Fargo Theatre, built 1926, 312-316 Broadway
- The Black Building, built 1931, is included in the district and also became separately listed on the National Register in 2016.

Significant buildings, structures, and objects include:

- Rollo statue, recognizing Norse citizenry.
