= George and Beth Anderson House =

Historic house in North Dakota, United States

- U.S. National Register of Historic Places
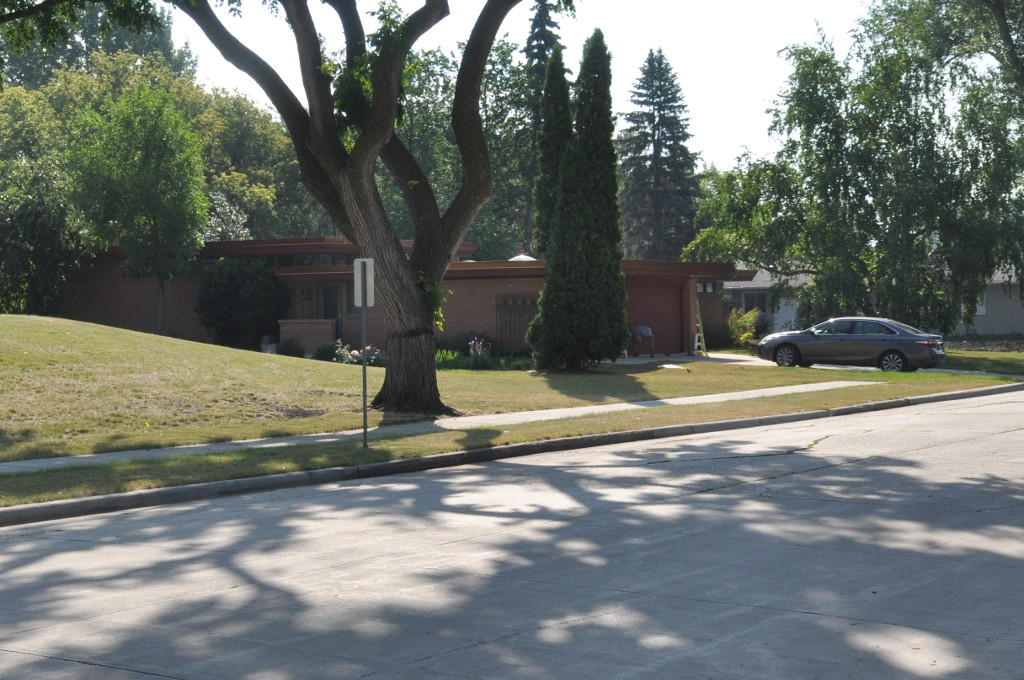

- Location within North Dakota Location within the United States
- Location: 1458 S. River Rd., Fargo, North Dakota
- Coordinates: 46.858137°N 96.782418°W
- Area: less than one acre
- NRHP reference No.: 100001221
- Added to NRHP: June 19, 2017

The George and Beth Anderson House is a Frank Lloyd Wright-esque style house in Fargo, North Dakota. It was listed on the National Register of Historic Places in 2017.

It was designed by Ingraham & Ingraham, Architects, of Colorado Springs, Colorado, a firm headed by Elizabeth Wright Ingraham, Wright's granddaughter, and her husband Gordon Ingraham. Built in 1958, it has only clerestory windows on some sides of the house, and larger windows facing northeast towards the Red River.

The house was built in floodplain of the Red River and was damaged in multiple floods, including in 1997 and 2009. It was targeted for potential demolition in a flood control project. The owners had been offered a buyout price which they declined. In early 2017, the owners were seeking recognition of the house's historic and architectural merit by seeking National Register of Historic Places recognition.
