= Robert Lindemann House =

Historic house in North Dakota, United States

- U.S. National Register of Historic Places
- Location within North Dakota Location within the United States
- Location: 5126 138th Ave SE, Enderlin, North Dakota
- Coordinates: 46.6689399°N 97.5769343°W
- Built: 1913
- Architect: Robert Lindemann
- Architectural style: Queen Anne
- NRHP reference No.: 94001073
- Added to NRHP: September 2, 1994

The Robert Lindemann House, also known as the Karl Lindemann House, is a Queen Anne style house in rural Enderlin, North Dakota. It was listed on the National Register of Historic Places in 1994.

The house was built in 1913 by Robert Theodore Lindemann (1870–1933) and Alvina Bertha Fraedrich Lindemann (1883–1980) who farmed in rural Pontiac Township, Cass County. The former residence is locally significant as the best preserved Queen Anne style property in the area. It is a three-story building with an octagonal turret. The house had remained in the family from its construction in 1913 until at least 1994, although it was unoccupied since 1981.
