= Selenophoma linicola =

Scientific classification
- Kingdom: Fungi
- Division: Ascomycota
- Class: Dothideomycetes
- Order: Dothideales
- Family: Saccotheciaceae
- Genus: Selenophoma
- Species: S. linicola

Binomial name
- Selenophoma linicola Vanterp. (1947)

Species of fungus

Selenophoma linicola is a fungal plant pathogen infecting flax.
