= Colletotrichum lini =

Scientific classification
- Kingdom: Fungi
- Division: Ascomycota
- Class: Sordariomycetes
- Order: Glomerellales
- Family: Glomerellaceae
- Genus: Colletotrichum
- Species: C. lini

Binomial name
- Colletotrichum lini Pethybr., (1926)

Species of fungus

Colletotrichum lini is a fungal plant pathogen which causes anthracnose in flax.
