= Shea Site =

- U.S. National Register of Historic Places
- Nearest city: Embden, North Dakota
- Area: 3 acres (1.2 ha)
- NRHP reference No.: 96000817
- Added to NRHP: July 25, 1996

The Shea Site is a Native American archeological site near Embden, North Dakota. It was the site of a Native American village on a bluff overlooking the Maple River floodplain. It was protected by a deep "dry moat or fortification ditch." The 3-acre (1.2 ha) site was excavated by archaeologists in the mid-1980s and listed on the National Register of Historic Places in 1996.
