= Fargo station (Northern Pacific Railway) =

- Northern Pacific Railway Depot
- U.S. National Register of Historic Places
- U.S. Historic district – Contributing property
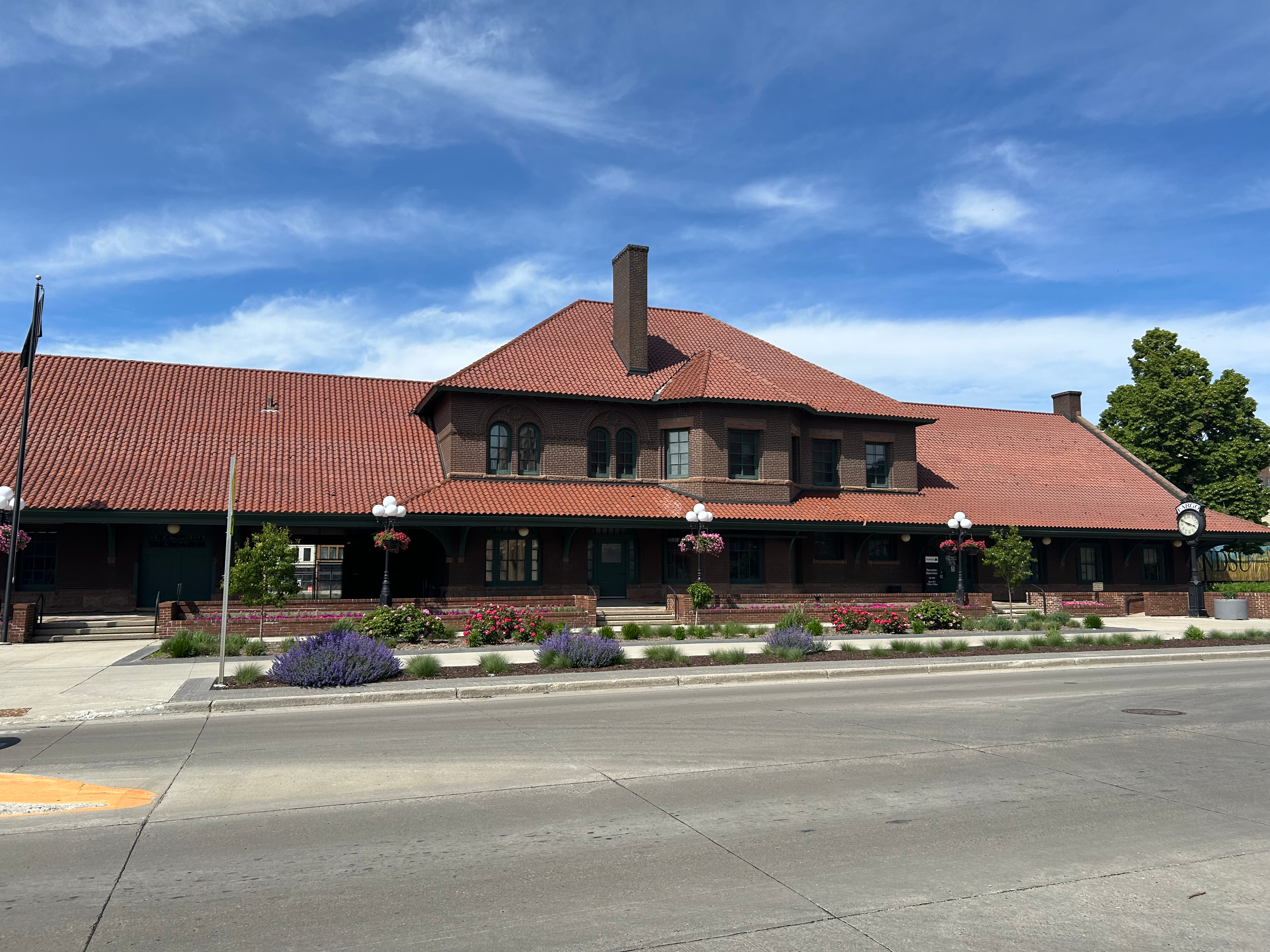

- Location within North Dakota Location within the United States
- Location: 701 Main Ave., Fargo, North Dakota
- Coordinates: 46°52′29″N 96°47′21″W
- Area: less than 1 acre (0.40 ha)
- Built: 1898
- Architect: Cass Gilbert
- Part of: Downtown Fargo District (ID83004064)
- NRHP reference No.: 75001304

Significant dates
- Added to NRHP: February 13, 1975
- Designated CP: October 13, 1983

The Fargo station is a former railway station in Fargo, North Dakota. Built in 1898, it was listed on the National Register of Historic Places in 1975 as the Northern Pacific Railway Depot.

== History ==
The station was built in 1898. It was designed by architect Cass Gilbert.

At the time of the station's construction, Fargo-Moorhead was served by both the Northern Pacific Railway and the Great Northern Railway. This station was served by Northern Pacific Railway trains, while the Great Northern Railway operated its own station further north along Broadway.

=== End of service ===
In 1970, the two railway companies merged to form the Burlington Northern Railroad. Freight trains used the Northern Pacific Railway tracks, while passenger trains used the Great Northern Railway tracks. Therefore, passenger trains no longer stopped at the Northern Pacific Railway station.

=== Historic designation ===
The station was listed on the National Register of Historic Places in 1975. The listing included one contributing building on an area of less than 1 acre (0.40 ha).

It is also included within the also-NRHP-listed Downtown Fargo District.

Preceding station	Northern Pacific Railway	Following station
West Fargo toward Seattle or Tacoma	Main Line	Moorhead toward St. Paul
Cotter toward Streeter	Streeter – Fargo	Terminus
