= North Side Fargo Builder's Residential Historic District =

Historic district in North Dakota, United States

- U.S. National Register of Historic Places
- U.S. Historic district
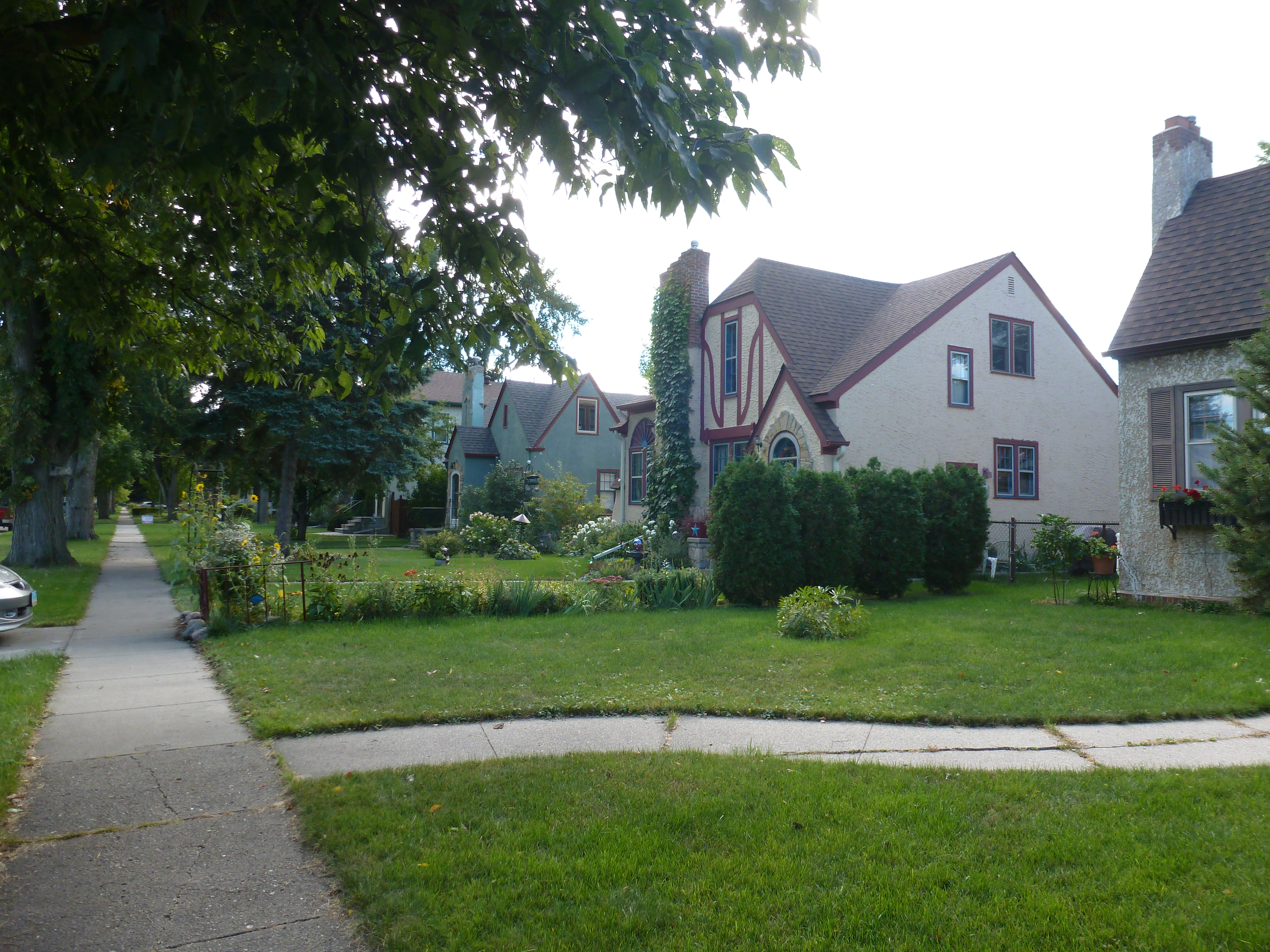

- Location within North Dakota Location within the United States
- Location: Roughly bounded by Benjamin Franklin School area and Golf Course, First St., Twelfth Ave. N, and Fourth St., Fargo, North Dakota
- Coordinates: 46.89308°N 96.78389°W
- Area: 25.4 acres (10.3 ha)
- Built: 1925
- Architect: Jones, Paul W.; Et al.
- Architectural style: Colonial Revival, Tudor Revival
- MPS: North Side Fargo MRA
- NRHP reference No.: 86003737
- Added to NRHP: April 7, 1987

The North Side Fargo Builder's Residential Historic District is a 25.4-acre (10.3 ha) historic district with 103 contributing buildings located eight blocks north of downtown Fargo, North Dakota. The district's name derives from the fact that the plans for the houses came from popular builder's pattern books. The homes were built in the late 1920s and 1930s. Tudor Revival is the predominant style, though Colonial Revival and American Foursquare architecture is also present. The district was listed on the National Register of Historic Places in 1987.

== See also ==
- North Side Fargo High Style Residential Historic District
