= Kabatiella lini =

Scientific classification
- Domain: Eukaryota
- Kingdom: Fungi
- Division: Ascomycota
- Class: Dothideomycetes
- Order: Dothideales
- Family: Saccotheciaceae
- Genus: Kabatiella
- Species: K. lini

Binomial name
- Kabatiella lini (Laff.) Karak. (1957)

Synonyms
- Polyspora lini Laff. (1921); Pullularia pullulans var. lini (Laff.) N.H.White (1945); Microstroma lini (Laff.) Krenner (1954); Aureobasidium pullulans var. lini (Laff.) W.B.Cooke (1962); Aureobasidium lini (Laff.) Herm.-Nijh. (1977)

Species of fungus

Kabatiella lini is a species of fungus in the family Saccotheciaceae. It is a plant pathogen that infects flax.
