= North Side Fargo High Style Residential Historic District =

Historic district in North Dakota, United States

- U.S. National Register of Historic Places
- U.S. Historic district
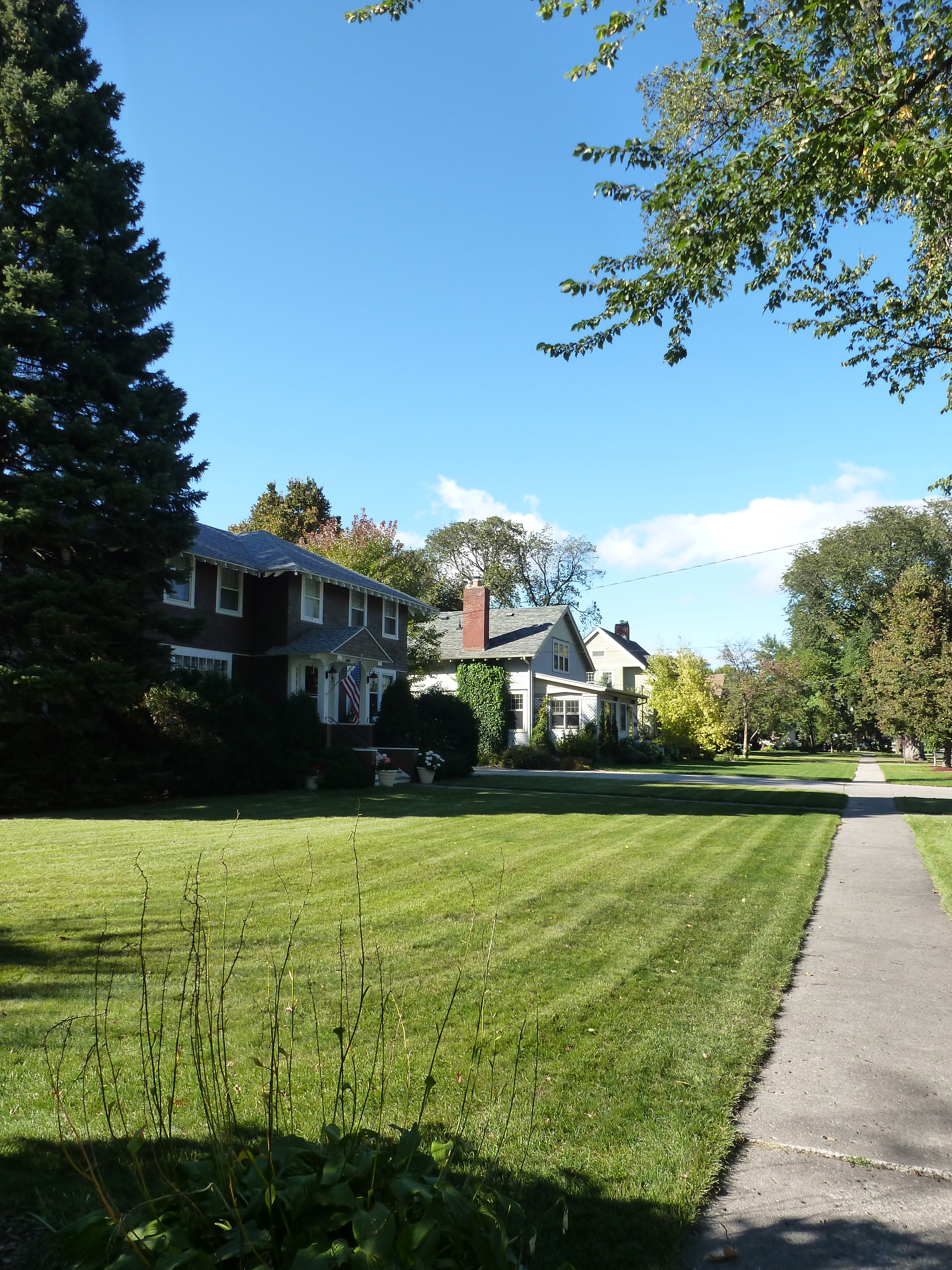

- Location within North Dakota Location within the United States
- Location: Roughly bounded by Twelfth Ave. N, Fourth St., Eleventh Ave. N, and Seventh St., Fargo, North Dakota
- Coordinates: 46.88946°N 96.78703°W
- Area: 11.7 acres (4.7 ha)
- Built: 1894
- Architect: Walter & George Hancock
- Architectural style: Colonial Revival, American Foursquare
- MPS: North Side Fargo MRA
- NRHP reference No.: 86003739
- Added to NRHP: April 7, 1987

The North Side Fargo High Style Residential Historic District in Fargo, North Dakota has significance dating back to 1894. It is a 11.7-acre (4.7 ha) historic district with 33 contributing buildings. It includes Colonial Revival, American Foursquare, and other architecture. It was listed on the National Register of Historic Places in 1987.

== Gallery ==
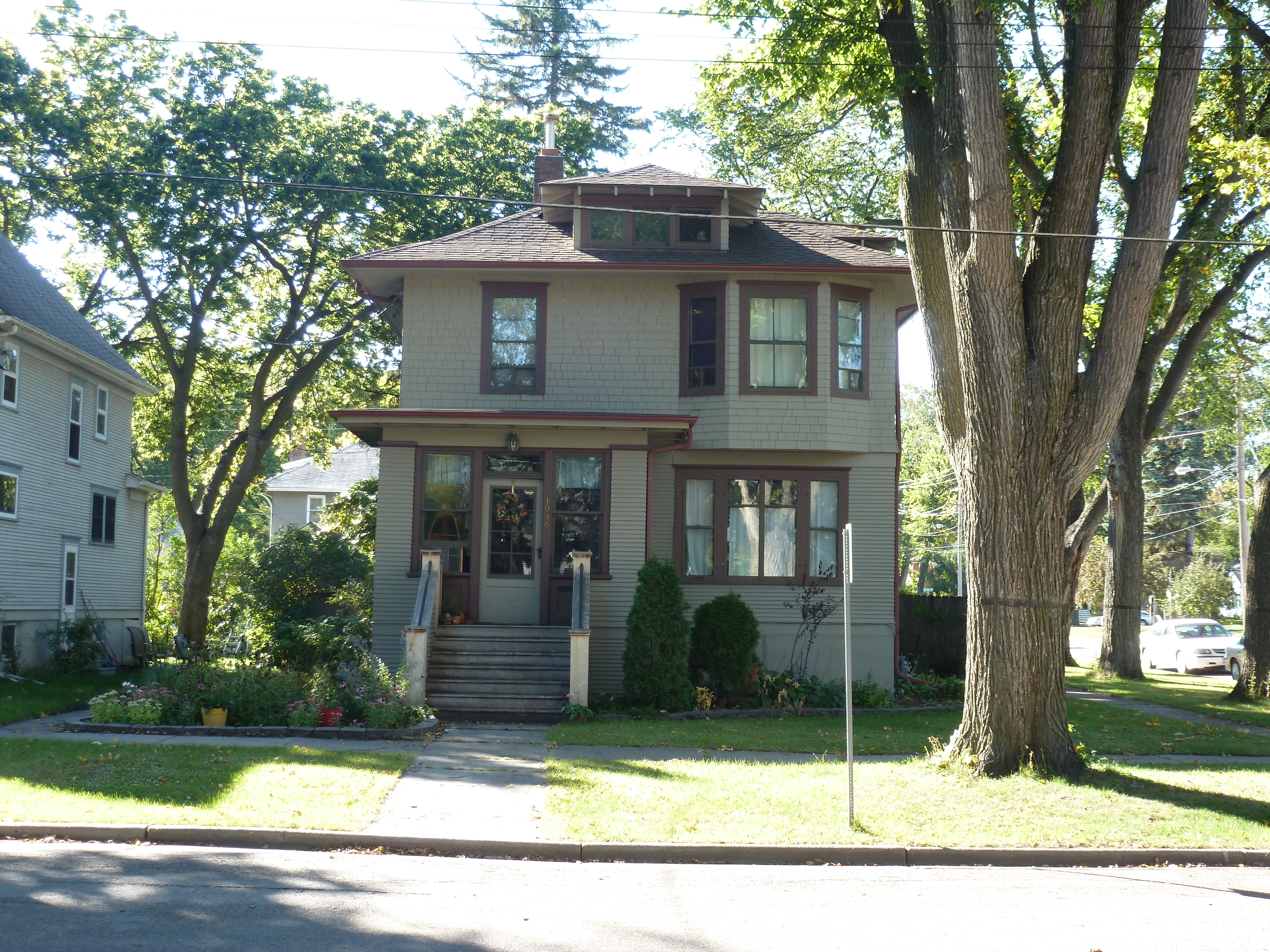
House in the district

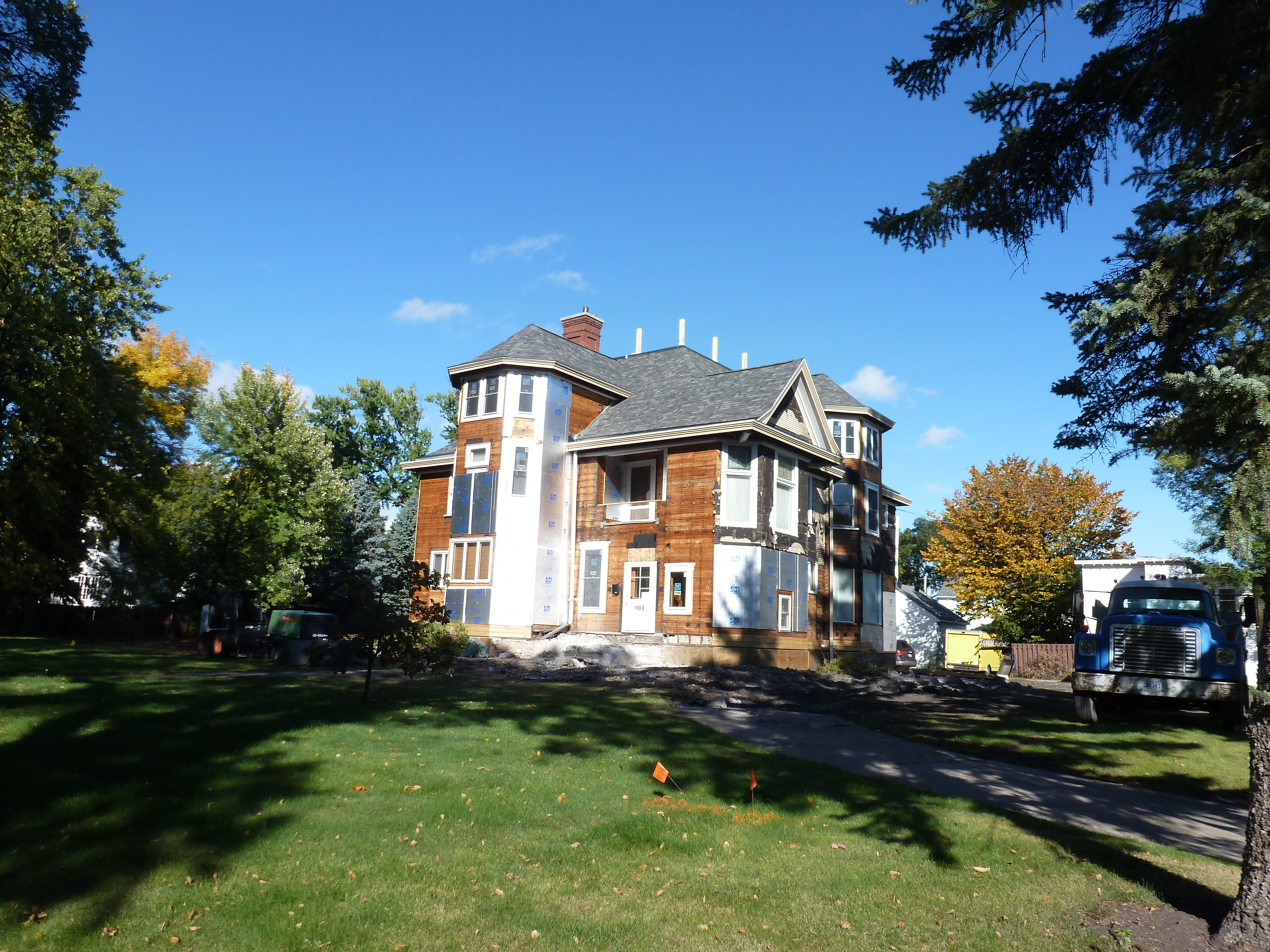
House undergoing restoration

== See also ==
- North Side Fargo Builder's Residential Historic District
