= Fusarium oxysporum f.sp. lini =

Scientific classification
- Domain: Eukaryota
- Kingdom: Fungi
- Division: Ascomycota
- Class: Sordariomycetes
- Order: Hypocreales
- Family: Nectriaceae
- Genus: Fusarium
- Species: F. oxysporum
- Forma specialis: F. o. f.sp. lini

Trionomial name
- Fusarium oxysporum f.sp. lini W.C. Snyder & H.N. Hansen, (1940)

Synonyms
- Fusarium lini Bolley, (1901); Fusarium oxysporum f. lini (Bolley) W.C. Snyder & H.N. Hansen, (1940)

Fungal plant pathogen

Fusarium oxysporum f.sp. lini is a fungal plant pathogen. Among the diseases it causes is flax wilt.

== See also ==
- List of flax diseases
