= Beatrice Willard Alpine Tundra Research Plots =

- Willard, Beatrice, Alpine Tundra Research Plots
- U.S. National Register of Historic Places
- U.S. Historic district
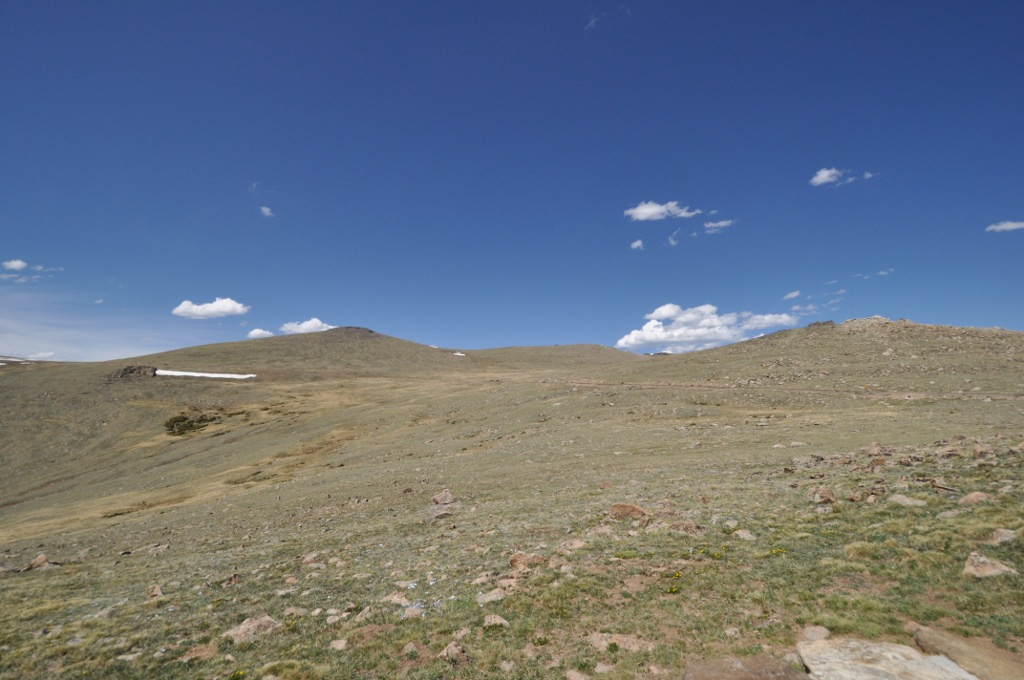
- View of the tundra near the Forest Canyon Overlook on the Trail Ridge Road

- Location within Colorado Location within the United States
- Nearest city: Estes Park, Colorado
- Coordinates: 40°23′43″N 105°42′40″W
- Area: less than one acre
- Built: 1959
- NRHP reference No.: 07001101
- Added to NRHP: October 25, 2007

The Beatrice Willard Alpine Tundra Research Plots were established in 1959 along Trail Ridge Road in Rocky Mountain National Park, Colorado, above the treeline in an alpine tundra habitat. The plots were used by Beatrice Willard of the Institute of Arctic and Alpine Research at the University of Colorado from 1959 to about 1999 in a long-term study of the alpine ecosystem. Willard's dissertation and updates, as well as her book Land Above the Trees: A Guide to American Alpine Tundra were highly influential in studies of alpine and tundra ecology. Her recommendations were used by the National Park Service in its management of the high alpine areas of the park. Willard's work continued after she moved on to other work, and for the last twenty years she made informal visits to the plots.

There are two plots. The Rock Cut Plot is at an elevation of 12,110 feet (3,690 m) near the Rock Cut parking area. The research plot is 5 feet (1.5 m) by 20 feet (6.1 m), within a 50-foot (15 m) by 40-foot (12 m) enclosure. A 3 feet (0.91 m) fence keeps park visitors from disturbing the plot, and is marked by an explanatory sign. An old footpath runs through the plot, and was monitored to establish rates of regrowth on the tundra. The Forest Canyon Plot is at an elevation of 11,716 feet (3,571 m), measuring only 10 feet (3.0 m) square, originally protected by a metal fence. It is close to the Forest Canyon Overlook.

The plots were placed on the National Register of Historic Places on October 25, 2007.
