= Leonard, North Dakota =

- City
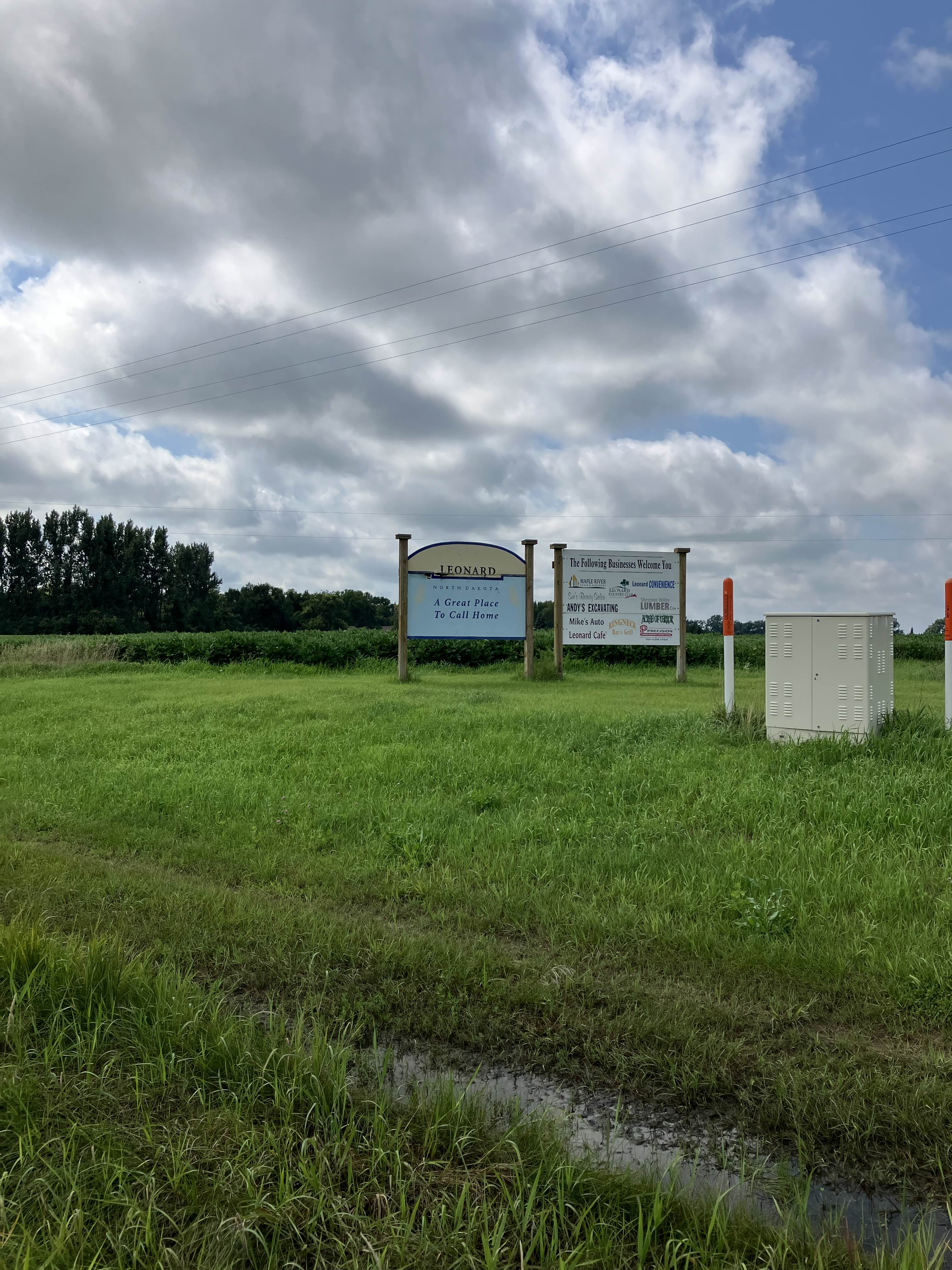
- Welcome signs to the city

- Location of Leonard, North Dakota
- Coordinates: 46°39′08″N 97°15′00″W
- Country: United States
- State: North Dakota
- County: Cass
- Founded: 1881

Government
  - Mayor: Sheila Brown

Area
  - Total: 0.75 sq mi (1.94 km^{2})
  - Land: 0.75 sq mi (1.94 km^{2})
  - Water: 0 sq mi (0.00 km^{2})
- Elevation: 1,050 ft (320 m)

Population (2020)
  - Total: 248
  - Estimate (2022): 245
  - Density: 330.4/sq mi (127.55/km^{2})
- Time zone: UTC-6 (Central (CST))
  - Summer (DST): UTC-5 (CDT)
- ZIP code: 58052
- Area code: 701
- FIPS code: 38-45980
- GNIS feature ID: 1036128
- Website: cityofleonardnd.gov

Leonard is a city in Cass County, North Dakota, United States. The population was 248 at the 2020 census. Leonard was founded in 1881.

== History ==
Leonard was founded in 1881 when the railroad was extended to that point. A post office has been in operation at Leonard since 1881.

== Geography ==
According to the United States Census Bureau, the city has a total area of 0.75 square miles (1.94 km^{2}), all land.

== Demographics ==
Historical population
Census	Pop.	Note	%±
1960	232		—
1970	221		−4.7%
1980	289		30.8%
1990	310		7.3%
2000	255		−17.7%
2010	223		−12.5%
2020	248		11.2%
2022 (est.)	245		−1.2%
U.S. Decennial Census; 2020 Census

=== 2010 census ===
As of the census of 2010, there were 223 people, 109 households, and 69 families living in the city. The population density was 297.3 inhabitants per square mile (114.8/km^{2}). There were 121 housing units at an average density of 161.3 per square mile (62.3/km^{2}). The racial makeup of the city was 97.8% White, 1.3% Native American, and 0.9% from two or more races. Hispanic or Latino of any race were 2.2% of the population.

There were 109 households, of which 22.0% had children under the age of 18 living with them, 54.1% were married couples living together, 5.5% had a female householder with no husband present, 3.7% had a male householder with no wife present, and 36.7% were non-families. 34.9% of all households were made up of individuals, and 15.6% had someone living alone who was 65 years of age or older. The average household size was 2.05 and the average family size was 2.61.

The median age in the city was 48.9 years. 18.8% of residents were under the age of 18; 2.3% were between the ages of 18 and 24; 22.9% were from 25 to 44; 37.2% were from 45 to 64; and 18.8% were 65 years of age or older. The gender makeup of the city was 51.6% male and 48.4% female.

=== 2000 census ===
As of the census of 2000, there were 255 people, 116 households, and 74 families living in the city. The population density was 514.9 inhabitants per square mile (198.8/km^{2}). There were 124 housing units at an average density of 250.4 per square mile (96.7/km^{2}). The racial makeup of the city was 98.04% White, 1.18% Native American, 0.39% from other races, and 0.39% from two or more races. Hispanic or Latino of any race were 0.39% of the population.

There were 116 households, out of which 21.6% had children under the age of 18 living with them, 56.9% were married couples living together, 4.3% had a female householder with no husband present, and 36.2% were non-families. 30.2% of all households were made up of individuals, and 16.4% had someone living alone who was 65 years of age or older. The average household size was 2.20 and the average family size was 2.74.

In the city, the population was spread out, with 21.6% under the age of 18, 3.9% from 18 to 24, 24.3% from 25 to 44, 24.3% from 45 to 64, and 25.9% who were 65 years of age or older. The median age was 45 years. For every 100 females, there were 96.2 males. For every 100 females age 18 and over, there were 98.0 males.

The median income for a household in the city was $33,500, and the median income for a family was $38,750. Males had a median income of $24,286 versus $17,500 for females. The per capita income for the city was $14,937. About 2.5% of families and 6.5% of the population were below the poverty line, including 4.6% of those under the age of eighteen and 1.8% of those 65 or over.
