= Enderlin, North Dakota =

- City
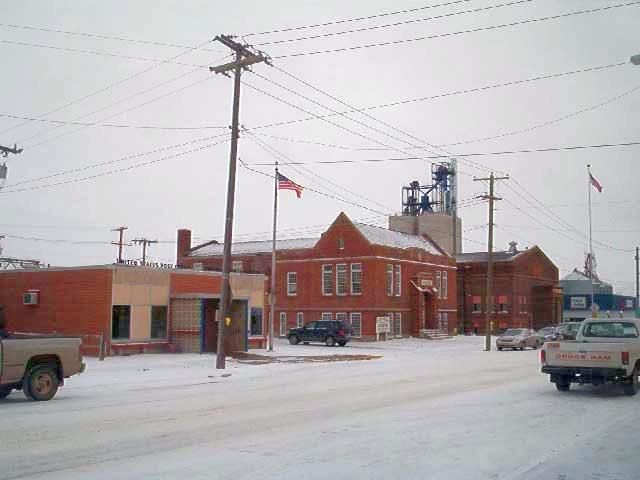
- Downtown Enderlin: post office, history center, city hall (January 2004)

- Logo
- Motto: Small Town With a BIG Heart!
- Interactive map of Enderlin, North Dakota
- Location within North Dakota
- Coordinates: 46.6215°N 97.5956°W
- Country: United States
- State: North Dakota
- Counties: Ransom, Cass
- Founded: October 7, 1891

Government
  - Type: Mayor–council
  - Mayor: Deon Maasjo
  - President: Kevin Bunn
  - Councilmembers: Terri Egan; Kayl Hamre; Shelly Hanson; Roger Maras; Tim Michaelson

Area
  - Total: 1.631 sq mi (4.223 km^{2})
  - Land: 1.631 sq mi (4.223 km^{2})
  - Water: 0 sq mi (0.000 km^{2}) 0.00%
- Elevation: 1,070 ft (326 m)

Population (2020)
  - Total: 881
  - Estimate (2025): 860
  - Density: 540/sq mi (209/km^{2})
- Time zone: UTC–6 (Central (CST))
  - Summer (DST): UTC–5 (CDT)
- ZIP Code: 58027
- Area code: 701
- FIPS code: 38-24260
- GNIS feature ID: 1036024
- Website: enderlinnd.com

Enderlin is a city in Ransom and Cass Counties, North Dakota, United States. The population was 881 as of the 2020 census, and was estimated at 860 in 2025.

== History ==
Enderlin was founded on October 7, 1891. One of the oldest buildings in town, the Robert Lindemann House, was built in 1913 and is on the National Register of Historic Places.

Local folklore suggests the name is derived from the semi-German "End der Line" ("end of the line"), as the city was briefly the terminus of the Soo Line Railroad's main line through North Dakota. Another explanation is that the name was suggested by the wife of a Soo Line official and comes from a fictional character in a book.

=== 2025 tornado ===
On the night of June 20, 2025, during a significant tornado outbreak and derecho, an EF5 tornado caused extensive damage as it passed to the east of the city, across Ransom and Cass Counties. Several farmhouses and homesteads were impacted by this very violent tornado, resulting in three fatalities. It was the deadliest tornado to occur in North Dakota since 1978, and was the first confirmed EF5 tornado to occur worldwide in 12 years since the 2013 tornado that struck Moore, Oklahoma.

== Geography ==
Enderlin is located along the Maple River.

According to the United States Census Bureau, the city has a total area of 1.631 square miles (4.22 km^{2}), all land.

=== Climate ===
This climatic region is typified by large seasonal temperature differences, with warm to hot (and often humid) summers and cold (sometimes severely cold) winters. According to the Köppen Climate Classification system, Enderlin has a humid continental climate, abbreviated "Dfb" on climate maps.

Climate data for Enderlin 2W, North Dakota (1991–2020 normals, extremes 1952–present)
Month	Jan	Feb	Mar	Apr	May	Jun	Jul	Aug	Sep	Oct	Nov	Dec	Year
Record high °F (°C)	55 (13)	66 (19)	81 (27)	99 (37)	99 (37)	103 (39)	106 (41)	108 (42)	102 (39)	92 (33)	75 (24)	60 (16)	108 (42)
Mean daily maximum °F (°C)	22.5 (−5.3)	27.2 (−2.7)	40.2 (4.6)	57.4 (14.1)	71.4 (21.9)	80.3 (26.8)	84.9 (29.4)	83.2 (28.4)	75.7 (24.3)	59.4 (15.2)	41.9 (5.5)	27.6 (−2.4)	56.0 (13.3)
Daily mean °F (°C)	12.9 (−10.6)	17.2 (−8.2)	30.3 (−0.9)	45.5 (7.5)	59.1 (15.1)	69.0 (20.6)	73.0 (22.8)	70.9 (21.6)	63.0 (17.2)	48.3 (9.1)	32.6 (0.3)	18.9 (−7.3)	45.1 (7.3)
Mean daily minimum °F (°C)	3.3 (−15.9)	7.1 (−13.8)	20.3 (−6.5)	33.6 (0.9)	46.8 (8.2)	57.7 (14.3)	61.1 (16.2)	58.7 (14.8)	50.2 (10.1)	37.1 (2.8)	23.2 (−4.9)	10.3 (−12.1)	34.1 (1.2)
Record low °F (°C)	−36 (−38)	−37 (−38)	−35 (−37)	−8 (−22)	18 (−8)	31 (−1)	38 (3)	31 (−1)	17 (−8)	6 (−14)	−25 (−32)	−32 (−36)	−37 (−38)
Average precipitation inches (mm)	0.54 (14)	0.64 (16)	1.18 (30)	1.51 (38)	3.17 (81)	4.13 (105)	3.40 (86)	2.70 (69)	2.66 (68)	2.14 (54)	0.82 (21)	0.68 (17)	23.57 (599)
Source: NOAA

== Demographics ==
Historical population
Census	Pop.	Note	%±
1900	636		—
1910	1,540		142.1%
1920	1,919		24.6%
1930	1,839		−4.2%
1940	1,593		−13.4%
1950	1,504		−5.6%
1960	1,596		6.1%
1970	1,343		−15.9%
1980	1,151		−14.3%
1990	997		−13.4%
2000	947		−5.0%
2010	886		−6.4%
2020	881		−0.6%
2025 (est.)	860		−2.4%
U.S. Decennial Census; 2020 Census

According to realtor website Zillow, the average price of a home as of June 30, 2026, in Enderlin was $173,226.

As of the 2024 American Community Survey, there were 457 estimated households in Enderlin with an average of 2.04 persons per household. The city has a median household income of $74,625. Approximately 12.5% of the city's population lives at or below the poverty line. Enderlin has an estimated 54.7% employment rate, with 14.0% of the population holding a bachelor's degree or higher and 94.2% holding a high school diploma. There were 502 housing units at an average density of 307.79 per square mile (118.8/km^{2}).

The top five reported languages (people were allowed to report up to two languages, thus the figures will generally add to more than 100%) were English (97.4%), Spanish (1.2%), Indo-European (1.3%), Asian and Pacific Islander (0.0%), and Other (0.2%).

The median age in the city was 47.1 years.

Enderlin, North Dakota – racial and ethnic composition Note: the US Census treats Hispanic/Latino as an ethnic category. This table excludes Latinos from the racial categories and assigns them to a separate category. Hispanics/Latinos may be of any race.
Race / ethnicity (NH = non-Hispanic)	Pop. 2000	Pop. 2010	Pop. 2020	% 2000	% 2010	% 2020
White alone (NH)	903	854	803	95.35%	96.39%	91.15%
Black or African American alone (NH)	3	2	11	0.32%	0.23%	1.25%
Native American or Alaska Native alone (NH)	4	6	3	0.42%	0.68%	0.34%
Asian alone (NH)	3	1	2	0.32%	0.11%	0.23%
Pacific Islander alone (NH)	0	0	0	0.00%	0.00%	0.00%
Other race alone (NH)	0	0	0	0.00%	0.00%	0.00%
Mixed race or multiracial (NH)	12	2	24	1.27%	0.23%	2.72%
Hispanic or Latino (any race)	22	21	38	2.32%	2.37%	4.31%
Total	947	886	881	100.00%	100.00%	100.00%

=== 2020 census ===
As of the 2020 census, there were 881 people, 374 households, and 192 families residing in the city. The population density was 540.16 inhabitants per square mile (208.6/km^{2}). There were 431 housing units at an average density of 264.26 per square mile (102.0/km^{2}). The racial makeup of the city was 92.96% White, 1.36% African American, 0.34% Native American, 0.23% Asian, 0.00% Pacific Islander, 1.02% from some other races and 4.09% from two or more races. Hispanic or Latino people of any race were 4.31% of the population.

=== 2010 census ===
As of the 2010 census, there were 886 people, 386 households, and 225 families residing in the city. The population density was 615.3 inhabitants per square mile (237.6/km^{2}). There were 454 housing units at an average density of 315.3 per square mile (121.7/km^{2}). The racial makeup of the city was 98.65% White, 0.23% African American, 0.79% Native American, 0.11% Asian, 0.00% Pacific Islander, 0.00% from some other races and 0.23% from two or more races. Hispanic or Latino people of any race were 2.37% of the population.

There were 386 households 24.4% had children under the age of 18 living with them, 49.0% were married couples living together, 6.2% had a female householder with no husband present, 3.1% had a male householder with no wife present, and 41.7% were non-families. 38.3% of households were one person and 19.4% were one person aged 65 or older. The average household size was 2.16 and the average family size was 2.81.

The median age was 48.5 years. 21.6% of residents were under the age of 18; 5% were between the ages of 18 and 24; 18.8% were from 25 to 44; 29.4% were from 45 to 64; and 25.2% were 65 or older. The gender makeup of the city was 49.2% male and 50.8% female.

=== 2000 census ===
As of the 2000 census, there were 947 people, 406 households, and 233 families residing in the city. The population density was 670.1 inhabitants per square mile (258.7/km^{2}). There were 481 housing units at an average density of 340.4 per square mile (131.4/km^{2}). The racial makeup of the city was 95.88% White, 0.32% African American, 0.42% Native American, 0.32% Asian, 0.00% Pacific Islander, 0.95% from some other races and 2.11% from two or more races. Hispanic or Latino people of any race were 2.32% of the population.

There were 406 households 27.3% had children under the age of 18 living with them, 47.8% were married couples living together, 6.2% had a female householder with no husband present, and 42.4% were non-families. 37.9% of households were one person and 20.2% were one person aged 65 or older. The average household size was 2.20 and the average family size was 2.96.

The age distribution was 22.8% under the age of 18, 5.5% from 18 to 24, 23.4% from 25 to 44, 22.6% from 45 to 64, and 25.7% 65 or older. The median age was 44 years. For every 100 females, there were 99.8 males. For every 100 females age 18 and over, there were 96.5 males.

The median household income was $32,589 and the median family income was $41,250. Males had a median income of $36,042 versus $21,023 for females. The per capita income for the city was $20,883. About 4.7% of families and 7.1% of the population were below the poverty line, including 7.1% of those under age 18 and 6.6% of those age 65 or over.

== Economy ==
Railway shipping remains an important part of the local economy, with the Soo Line, now a subsidiary of the Canadian Pacific Railway, continuing to operate a yard in the city. Another important part of the local economy is an ADM edible oil processing plant located just southeast of town.

== Notable people ==
- Kenneth O. Bjork, educator and historian
- T. Keith Glennan, space agency director
- Gaylord T. Gunhus, United States Army chaplain
- John Wall, North Dakota educator and politician
