= George Hancock (architect) =

American architect (1849–1924)

- Born: December 2, 1849; Uley, Gloucestershire, England
- Died: May 13, 1924 (aged 74); Fargo, North Dakota, United States
- Occupation: Architect
- Awards: Fellow, American Institute of Architects (1889)

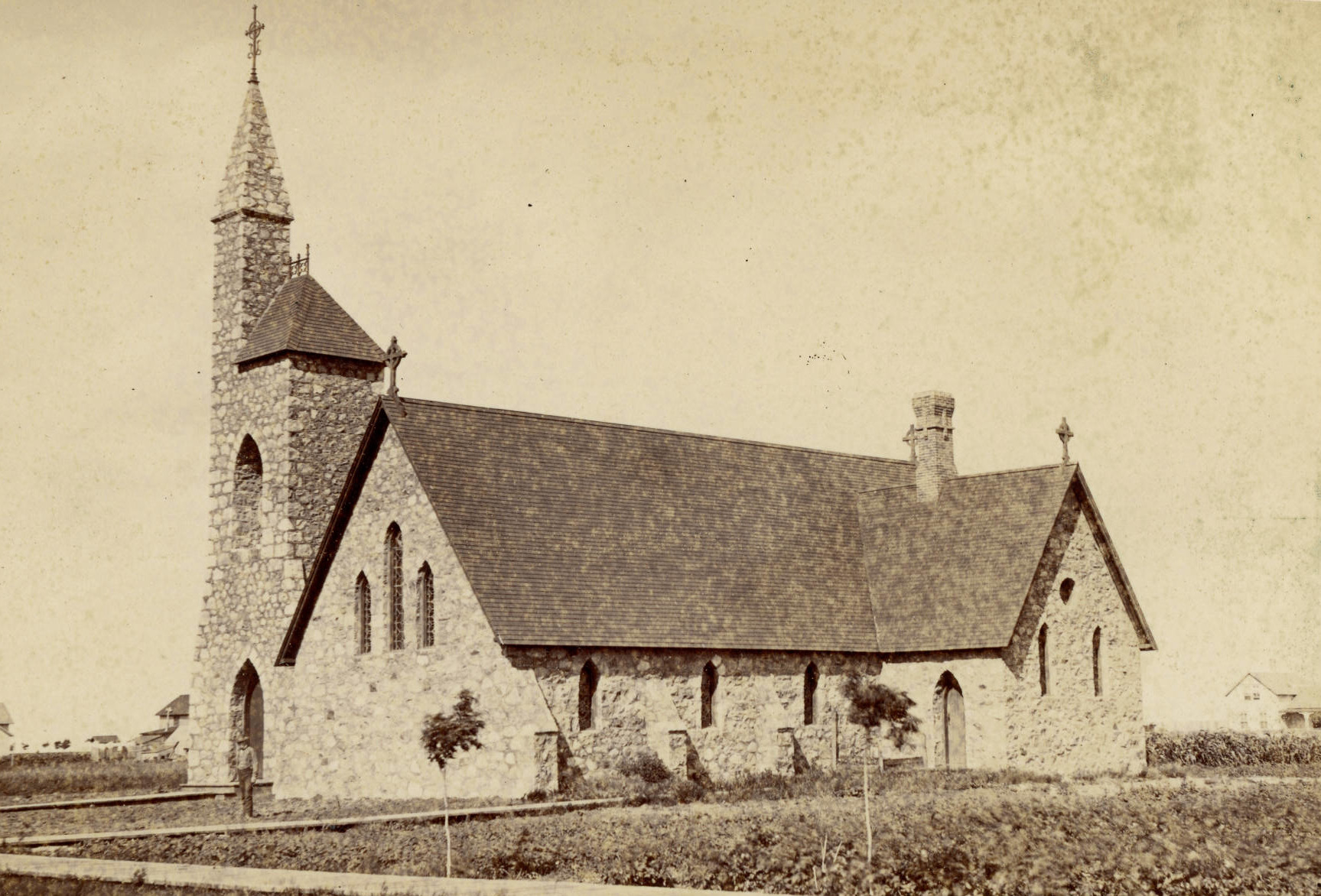
A period view of St. Stephen's Episcopal Church in Casselton, designed by Hancock in the Gothic Revival style and completed in 1887

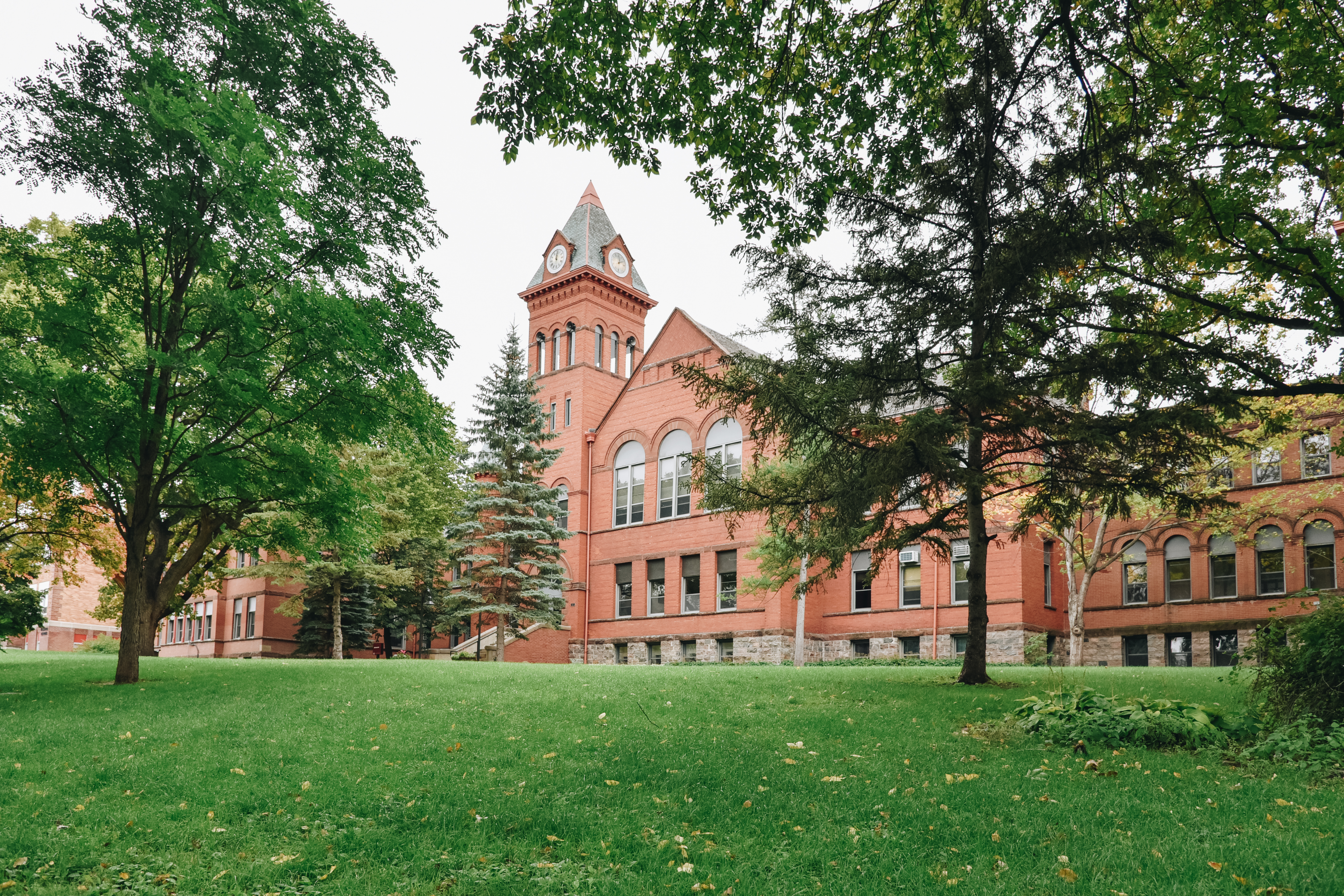
McFarland Hall and flanking buildings at Valley City State University, designed by Hancock Brothers in the Richardsonian Romanesque style and completed in 1892

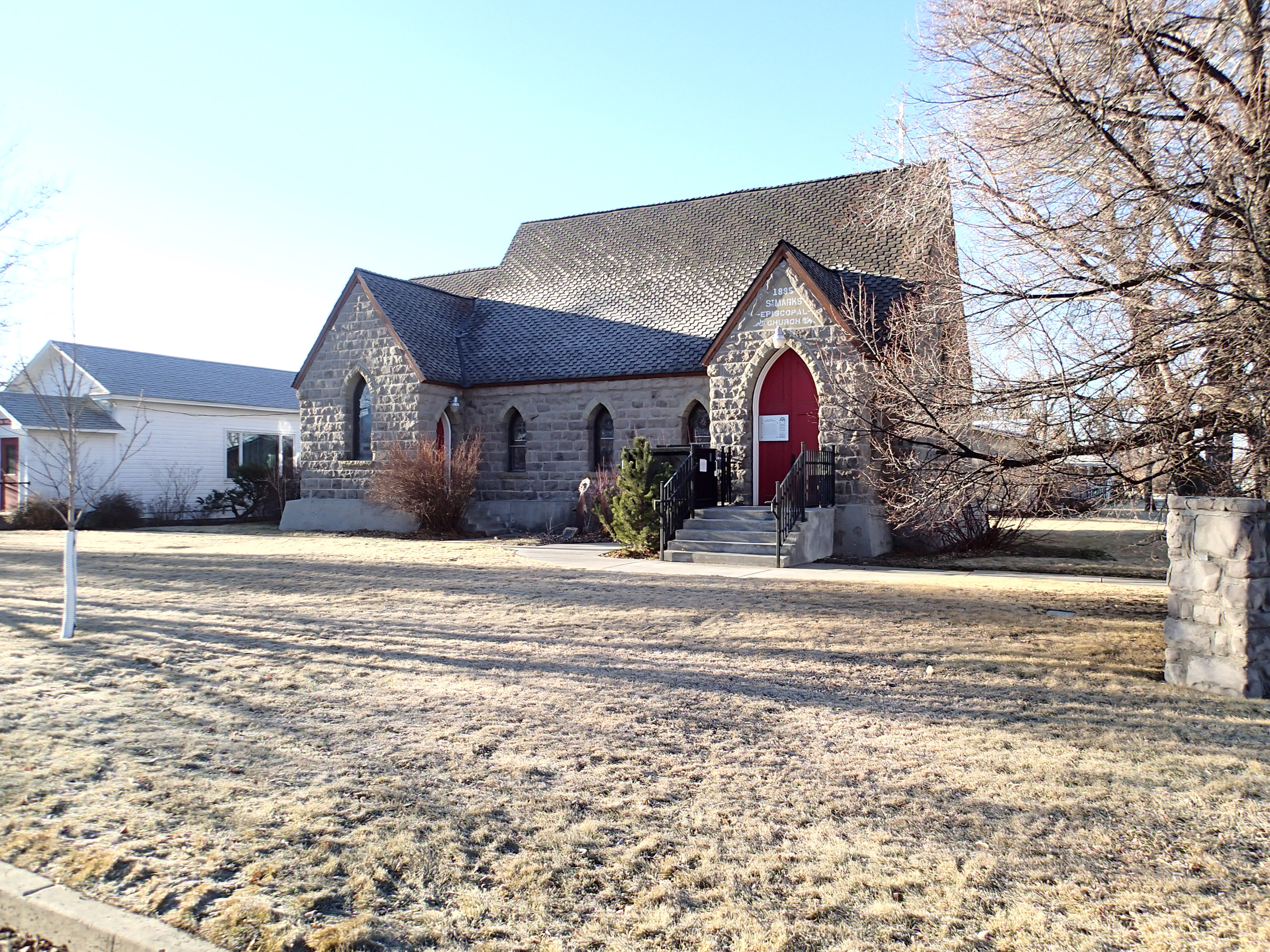
St. Mark's Episcopal Church in Big Timber, Montana, designed by Hancock Brothers in the Gothic Revival style and completed in 1896

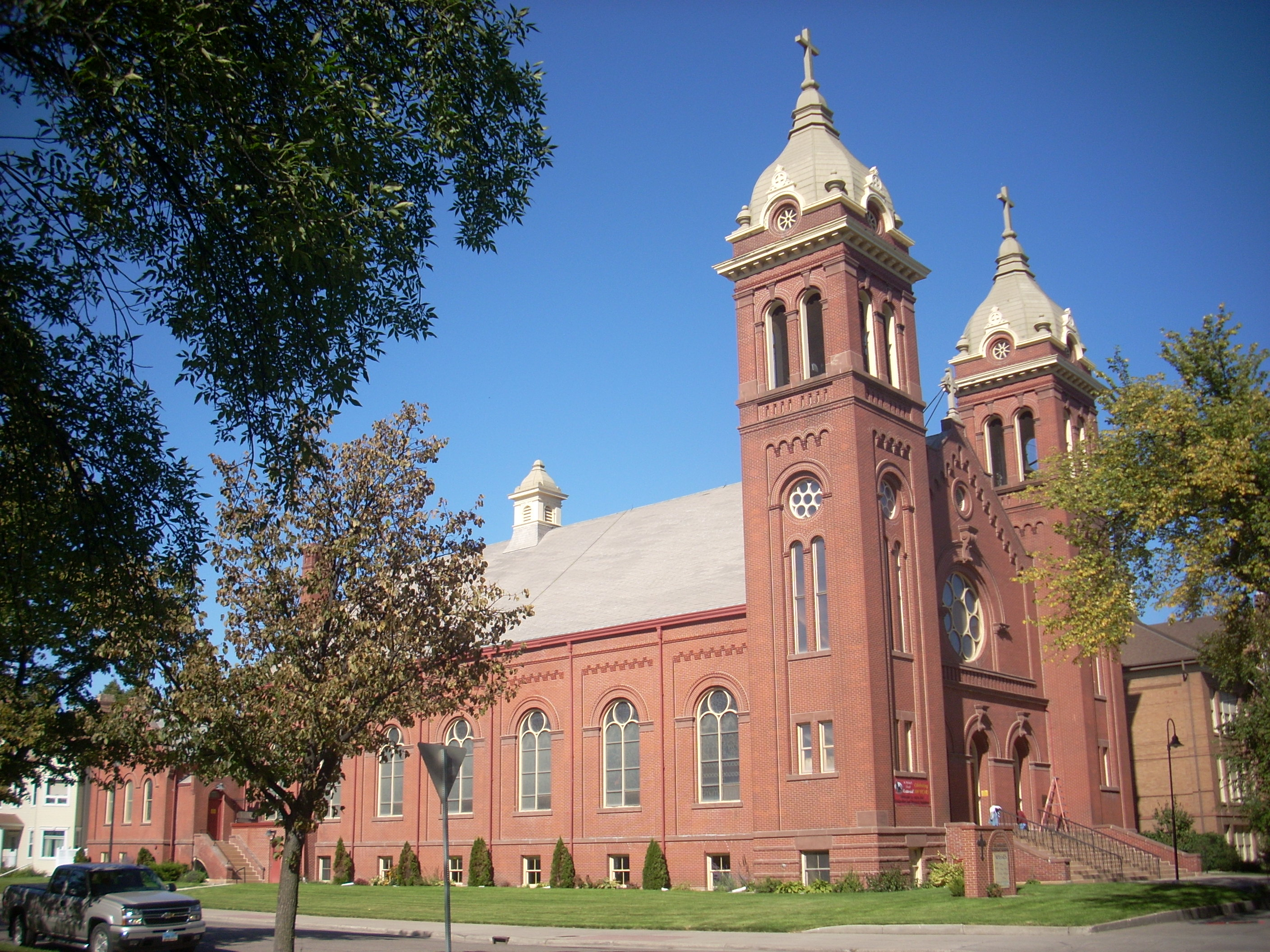
St. Michael's Catholic Church in Grand Forks, designed by Hancock Brothers in the Byzantine Revival style and completed in 1909

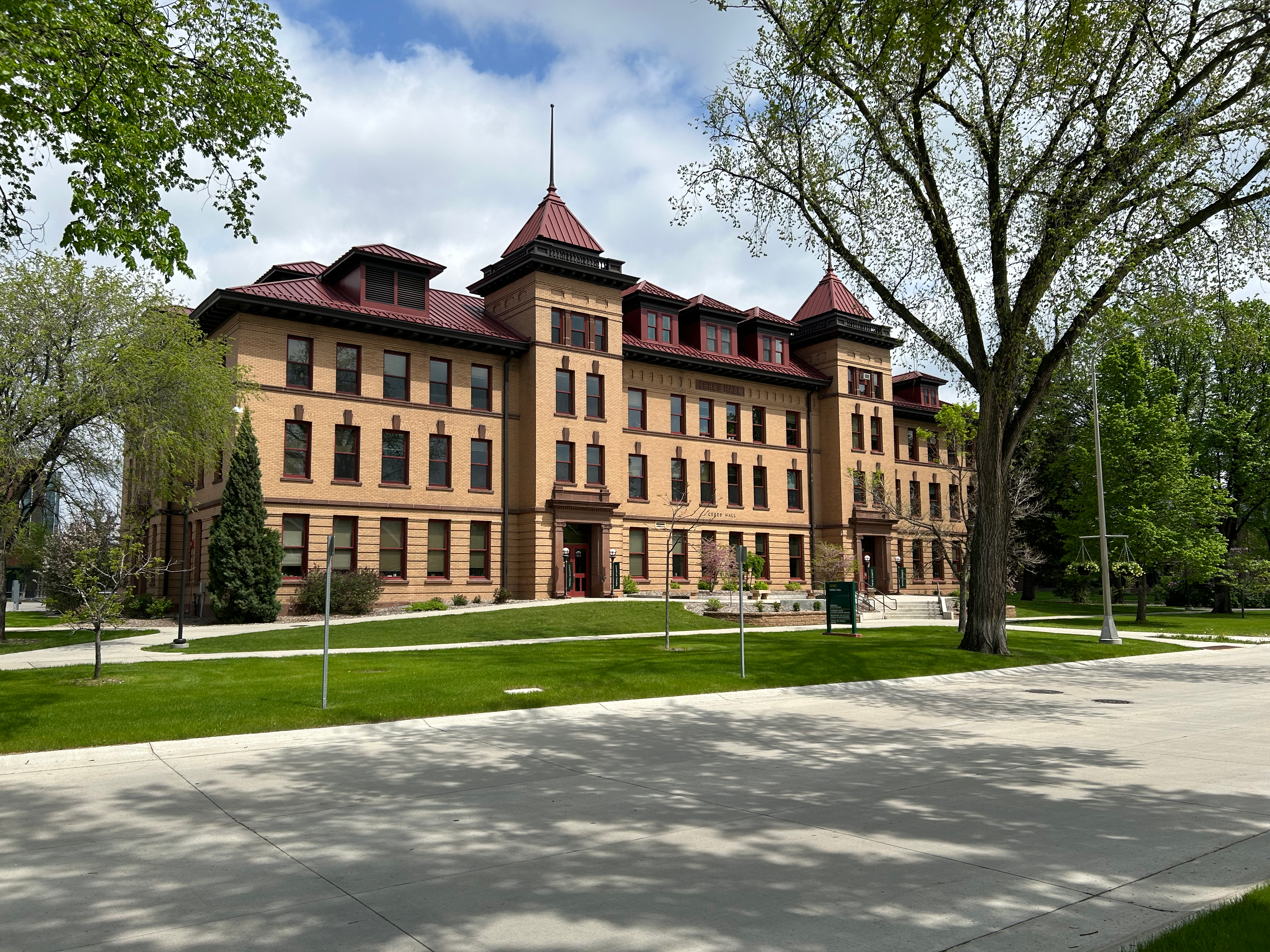
Ceres Hall of North Dakota State University, designed by Hancock Brothers in the Neoclassical style and completed in 1910

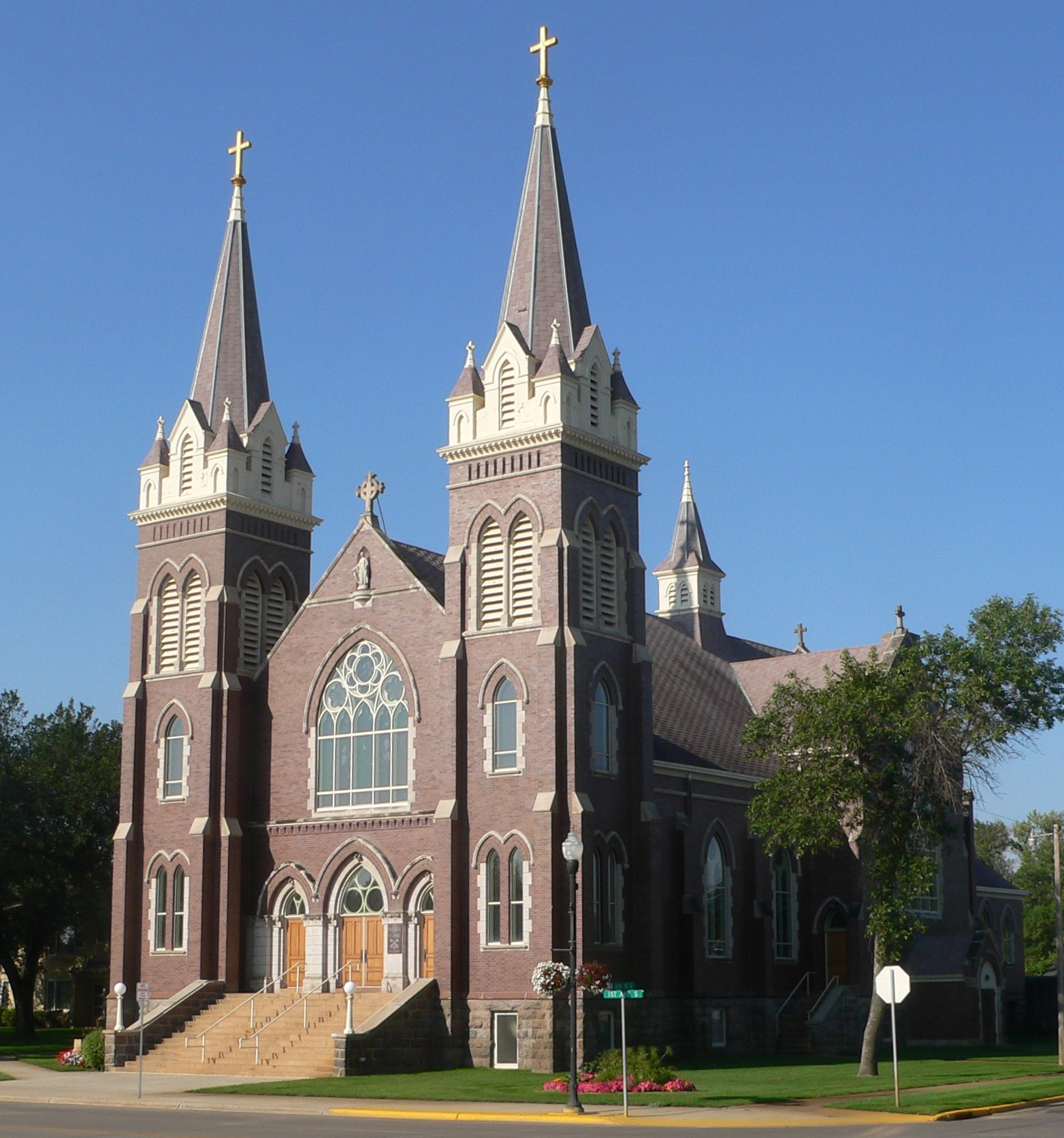
St. James Basilica in Jamestown, designed by Hancock Brothers in the Gothic Revival style and completed in 1914

George Hancock (December 2, 1849 – May 13, 1924) was an English-born American architect based in Fargo, North Dakota, beginning in 1882. From 1891 until his death he worked in partnership with his brother, Walter B. Hancock (September 5, 1863 – November 23, 1929) under the name Hancock Brothers. Independently and with his brother he completed works in North Dakota, Montana and Minnesota. He was an important figure in the professionalization of architectural practice in North Dakota.

== Biography ==
George David Hancock was born December 2, 1849, in the village of Uley in Gloucestershire, England. He was educated in architecture at the Government School of Design in South Kensington, London, after initial training as a mason. He and his younger brother, Walter Benjamin Hancock, settled in Fargo, Dakota Territory, in 1882 at the ages of 33 and 17, respectively. In July he formed the partnership of Fisher & Hancock, architects and civil engineers, with civil engineer C. Geoffrey Fisher. This was apparently not a fruitful relationship as the partnership was dissolved in August. At the time the only other architects in the city were Charles N. Daniels and his partner, John G. Proctor.

In 1884 Daniels & Proctor moved further west to Tacoma, Washington, leaving Hancock as possibly the only local architect. During the next few years Hancock, under the supervision of Benjamin Franklin Cooley, an Episcopal clergyman from Massachusetts, designed several Gothic Revival churches throughout the northern part of the territory. Many of these were more or less modeled on Christ Episcopal Church (Stephen C. Earle, 1881) in Medway, Massachusetts, Cooley's former parish. Cooley may have brought plans of that church, built mostly after his departure, to Dakota Territory. Hancock's Episcopal churches included Grace (1885, NRHP-listed) in Jamestown, Advent (1886, NRHP-listed) in Devils Lake, Calvary (1886, NRHP-listed) in Buffalo, Holy Trinity (1887) in Lisbon and St. Stephen's (1887, NRHP-listed) in Casselton. Though not documented, he may have also designed Calvary (1885) in Mayville, Good Shepherd (1886, NRHP-listed) in Lakota and Grace (1886, NRHP-listed) in Pembina.

At the close of the Dakota Boom, an estimated 95% of the architects resident in the territory left. Hancock, with his professional training and strong Episcopal church connections, was able to remain and withstand the economic downturn. He was assisted in his office by his brother, who in 1888-89 received some academic training in architecture as a special student at Syracuse University, studying with the class of 1891. He did not earn a degree but shortly before returning to Fargo was a charter member of the Syracuse chapter of the Beta Theta Pi fraternity. Walter Hancock brought back with him direct knowledge of the popular Richardsonian Romanesque style, which had a great influence on the work of the Hancock firm. One of their first Richardsonian works was Old Main (1893) of North Dakota State University (NDSU), which may show the direct influence of Crouse College (Archimedes Russell, 1889) at Syracuse University, under construction during Walter Hancock's education there.

In 1889 Hancock established a branch office in Montana, originally located at Livingston. By 1890 this was closed and Hancock had new offices in both Bozeman and Butte. In Butte he worked with local architect D. F. McDevitt under the name of Hancock & McDevitt and was awarded the commission to design the Butte City Hall (1891). By this time Hancock was dividing his time widely, to the displeasure of his clients. In January 1891 he was censured by the Butte city council for neglecting the work and in March, after the sudden death of McDevitt, he was removed as architect. In 1891, about the same time as this incident and the commencement of Old Main, George and Walter Hancock formed the partnership of Hancock Brothers with offices in Fargo and Bozeman. Hancock established himself in Bozeman as resident partner. In June 1893 much of downtown Fargo was destroyed by fire, the firm losing their office and records. Hancock returned to Fargo, where out of all local and out-of-state architects the firm was awarded the largest amount of rebuilding work–nearly half. Almost contemporaneously they were awarded a prestigious commission to expand the North Dakota State Capitol (1894, burned 1930) in Bismarck, left incomplete in 1884. In part due to cost constraints the new south wing, containing new legislative chambers and a formal entrance, was not coordinated with the older building. The Hancocks were among the many American architects influenced by the Neoclassical architecture of the World's Columbian Exposition of 1893. Before long they were mixing Richardsonian and Neoclassical elements in their work, eventually settling on the Neoclassical.

George and Walter Hancock practiced in partnership for over thirty years. Their other Fargo works include the Waldorf Hotel (1899, demolished), the Elliot–Powers House (1900), the McHench Building (1902), the Fargo Public Library (1903, demolished), the Gardner Hotel (1908), the Powers Hotel (1915, NRHP-listed) and the Merchants National Bank Building (1921). As an investment, they also designed and owned the Hancock Building (1903) in downtown Fargo. The northern "Douglass" section of the building, named for Walter Hancock's wife, was home to their offices. At NDSU, they designed Ceres Hall (1910) in addition to Old Main. For the state normal school at Valley City, now Valley City State University, they designed McFarland Hall (1892) and its flanking buildings. They designed churches and institutions for several denominations, including Grace Episcopal Church (1905, NRHP-listed) in Minnewaukan, St. John's Academy (1906, demolished) and St. James Basilica (1914, NRHP-listed) in Jamestown, St. Michael's Hospital (1907, NRHP-listed) and St. Michael's Catholic Church (1909, NRHP-listed) in Grand Forks, the German Evangelical St. Johns Church (1908, NRHP-listed) in Hebron and St. Mary's Academy (1909, NRHP-listed) in Devils Lake. Other North Dakota buildings included the Seiler Building (1904, NRHP-listed) in Jamestown and the McLean County Courthouse (1908, demolished 2013) in Washburn.

Hancock's other Bozeman work included St. James Episcopal Church (1890, NRHP-listed), the Hotel Bozeman (1891) and the Bozeman High School (1892, demolished). He also designed a house for Davis Willson, uncle of Fred F. Willson, later a noted local architect. Hancock had a strong influence on Willson and would visit him and his family when he was afterwards in town. Elsewhere in Montana Hancock designed St. Mark's Episcopal Church (1891, NRHP-listed) in Anaconda, the Pollard Hotel (1893) in Red Lodge and St. Mark's Episcopal Church (1896) in Big Timber. Also attributed to the Hancocks, without documentation, is Christ Episcopal Church (1896, NRHP-listed) in Sheridan. In Minnesota, they designed the Hannah C. and Peter E. Thompson House (1903, NRHP-listed) in Barnesville and the Hotel Kaddatz (1915, NRHP-listed) in Fergus Falls. On stylistic grounds, the Park Elementary School (1900, NRHP-listed) in Moorhead has been attributed to them.

Hancock was one of the pioneer architects of North Dakota and worked to develop the architectural profession in the state. He joined the Western Association of Architects in 1889, shortly before its merger with the American Institute of Architects (AIA). Upon the merger all members of both organizations became Fellows of the AIA, making him the first architect with that distinction in either Dakota. Like many members practicing in isolated parts of the United States he eventually allowed his membership to lapse. It was not until 1968 that Gilbert R. Horton of Jamestown became the first Fellow from North Dakota elected under the current system. Hancock had a leading role in the passage of an architects' licensing law, which occurred in 1917. In June governor Lynn Frazier appointed Hancock to the first board of registration. The board granted him license number 1, his brother number 2. Due to resistance the board had difficulties with implementing the law fully until 1920. About the same time Hancock was the inaugural president of the North Dakota Association of Architects, a group formed with the goal of affiliating with the AIA, a goal not achieved until 1953.

== Personal life and death ==
Hancock was married in 1894 to Florence Laing of London, Ontario. They had two children, both sons. He was a Mason and Shriner. He died May 13, 1924, at home in Fargo at the age of 74.
