= Grace Episcopal Church (Jamestown, North Dakota) =

Historic church in North Dakota, United States

- U.S. National Register of Historic Places
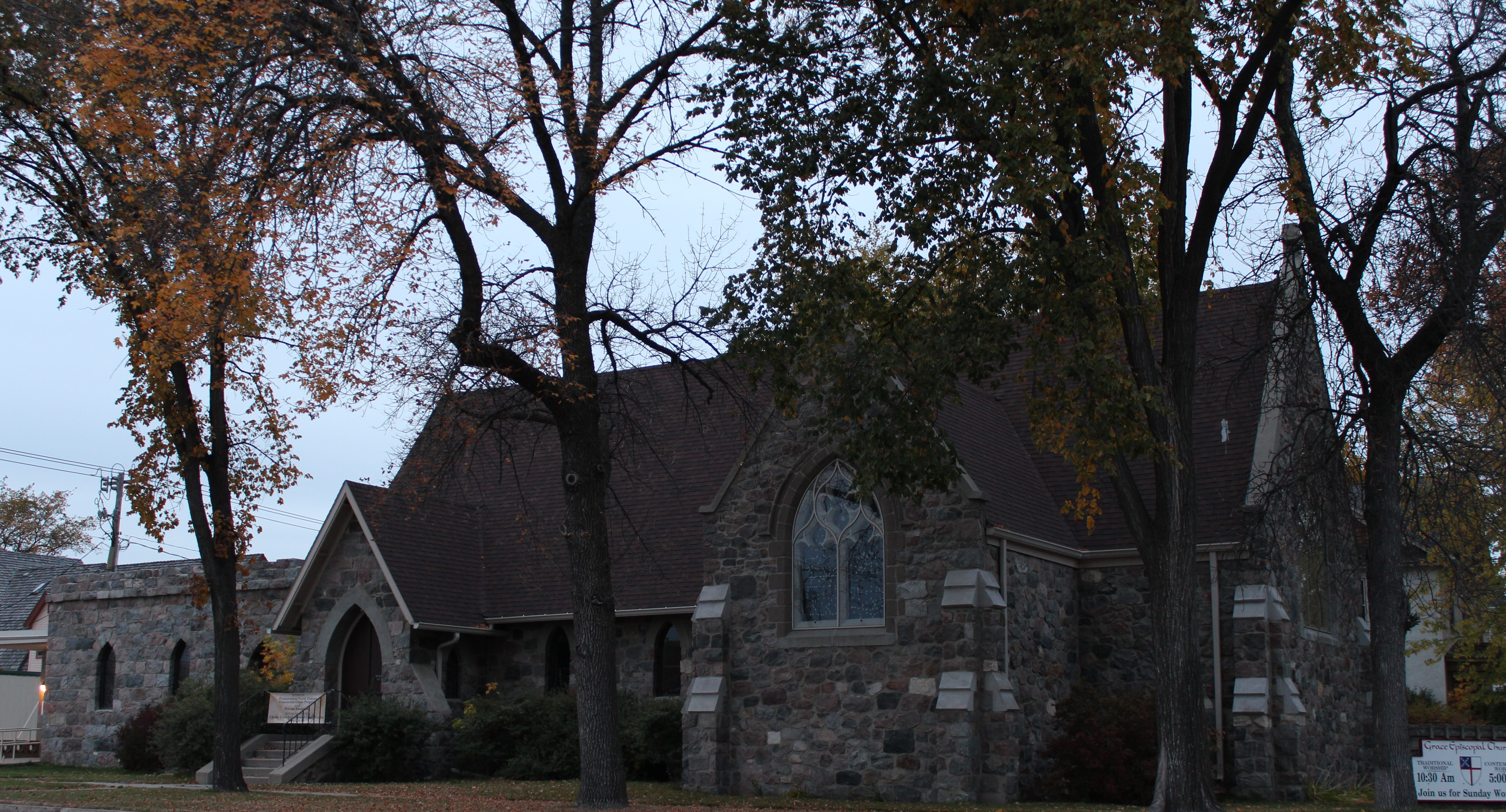

- Location within North Dakota Location within the United States
- Location: Jct. of 2nd Ave. NE. and 4th St. NE., NW corner, 405 2nd Avenue NE, Jamestown, North Dakota
- Coordinates: 46°54′41″N 98°42′23″W
- Area: less than one acre
- Built: 1884
- Architects: George Hancock; Later architect = Gilbert Horton
- Architectural style: Late Gothic Revival
- MPS: Episcopal Churches of North Dakota MPS
- NRHP reference No.: 92001606
- Added to NRHP: December 3, 1992

Grace Episcopal Church is an historic Episcopal church building located at 405 2nd Avenue, North East, in Jamestown, Stutsman County, North Dakota. Designed in the Late Gothic Revival style of architecture by British-born Fargo architect George Hancock, it was built 1884 of local fieldstone exterior walls and a wooden roof. Early parish records contain several assertions that George Hancock modeled the church after Christ Episcopal Church (Medway, Massachusetts) which had been opened in 1881, but if he did, it was only in a very general, not specific way. Hancock's later work St. Stephen's Episcopal Church (Casselton, North Dakota) is much more closely related to Christ Church, Medway. On December 3, 1992, Grace Episcopal Church was added to the National Register of Historic Places.

== Current status ==
Grace Episcopal Church is a parish in the Episcopal Diocese of North Dakota. The current rector is the Rev. Robert B. Hoekstra.

In 2015, the church reported 166 members; in 2023, it reported 166 members. No membership statistics were reported in 2024 national parochial reports. Plate and pledge financial support reported by the church in 2024 was $53,480. Average Sunday Attendance (ASA) reported in 2024 was 28 persons. This was a relative decrease from ASA of 81 persons reported in 2015.
