= German Evangelical St. Johns Church (Hebron, North Dakota) =

Historic church in North Dakota, United States

- German Evangelical St. Johns Church-Deutsche Evangelische St. Johannes Kirche
- U.S. National Register of Historic Places
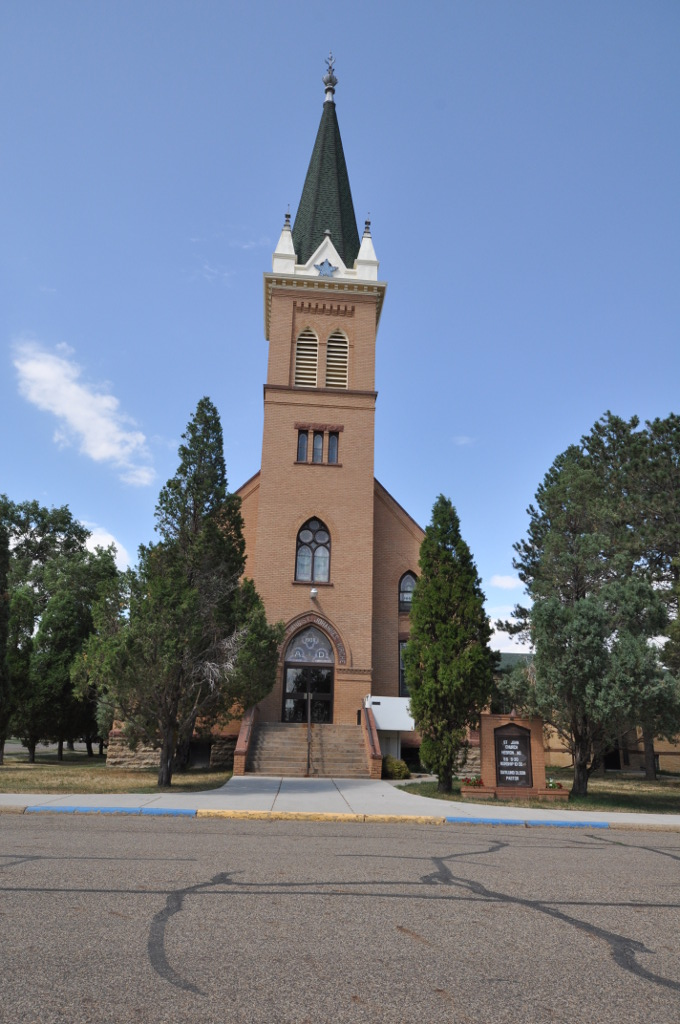

- Location within North Dakota Location within the United States
- Location: 624 Church Ave., Hebron, North Dakota
- Coordinates: 46°54′13″N 102°2′48″W
- Area: 2.8 acres (1.1 ha)
- Built: 1908
- Built by: Henry Bomgarten; Peter Kolling & Son
- Architect: Hancock Brothers; Turner, Inc.
- Architectural style: Gothic Revival
- NRHP reference No.: 00001642
- Added to NRHP: January 11, 2001

The German Evangelical St. Johns Church on Church Avenue in Hebron, North Dakota, also known as the Deutsche Evangelische St. Johannes Kirche, is now known as St. John United Church of Christ. The church building was listed on the National Register of Historic Places in 2001.

== History ==
The Gothic Revival structure was designed by Hancock Brothers of Fargo, North Dakota and was built in 1908 by contractor Henry Bomgarten with stonemasonry by Conrad Klick of Hebron. The parish house was designed by architect Turner, Inc., of Dickinson, North Dakota and built by contractor Peter Kolling & Son, also of Dickinson. The building was constructed of brick provided by the Hebron Brick Company.

== Other sources ==
- Hebron's Heritage: A History, 1885-1960
