= St. Stephen's Episcopal Church (Casselton, North Dakota) =

Historic church in North Dakota, United States

- U.S. National Register of Historic Places
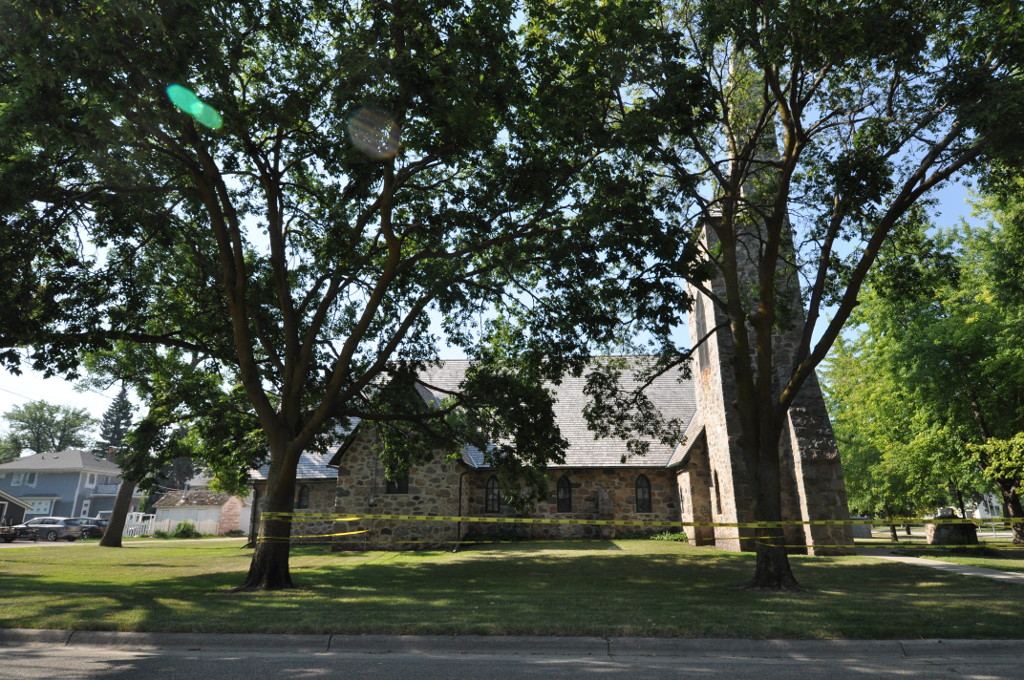

- Location within North Dakota Location within the United States
- Location: 241 Langer Ave N, Casselton, North Dakota
- Coordinates: 46.9034695°N 97.2106983°W
- Built: 1886
- Architect: George Hancock
- Architectural style: Gothic Revival
- MPS: Episcopal Churches of North Dakota MPS
- NRHP reference No.: 92001609
- Added to NRHP: December 3, 1992

The former St. Stephen's Episcopal Church also known as St. Stephen's Church, is an historic stone Gothic Revival-style Episcopal church building located on the southeast corner of 3rd Avenue and 5th Street in Casselton, North Dakota, United States.

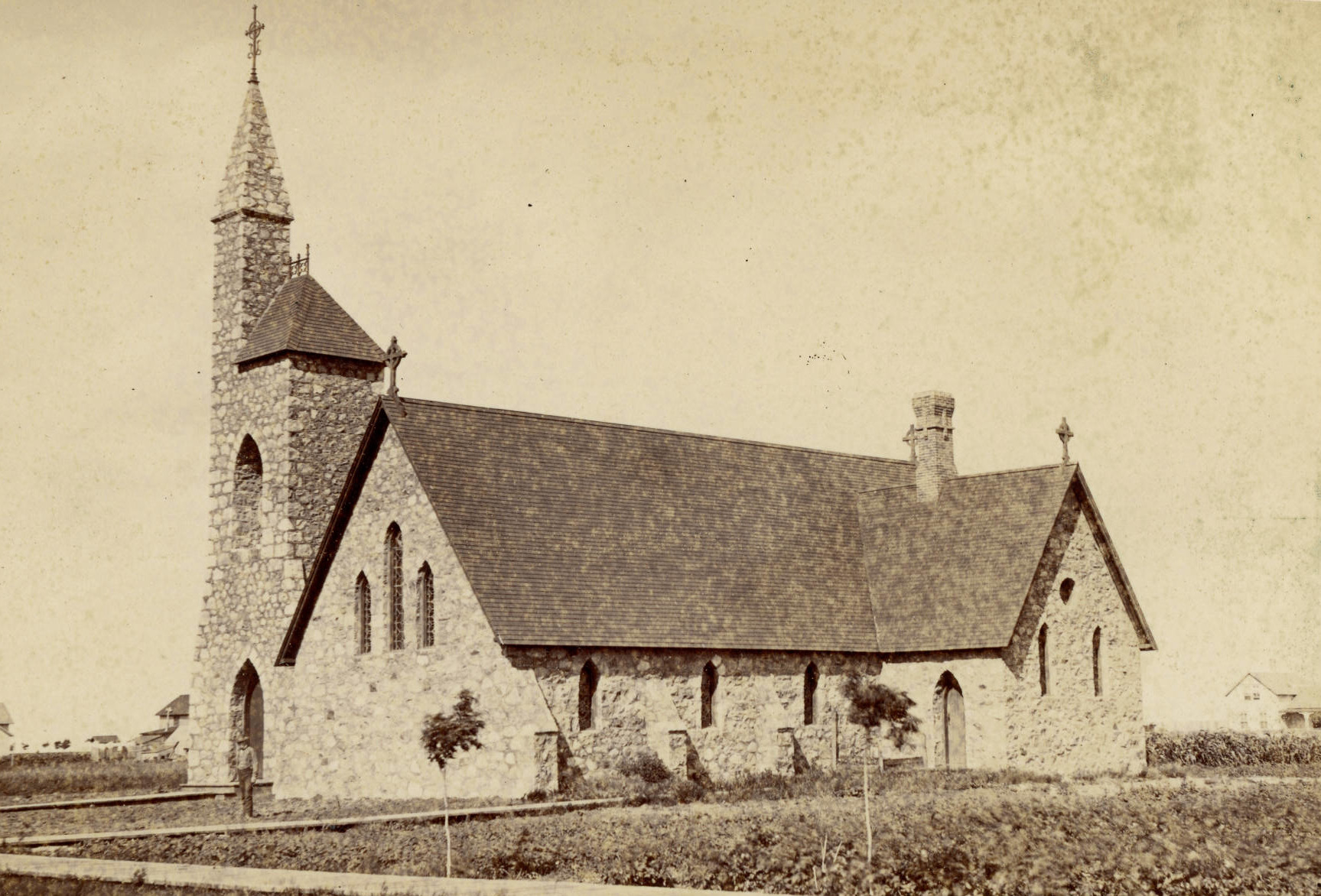
St. Stephen's Episcopal Church in Casselton, Dakota Territory, 1880s

Built in 1886, it was designed by British-born Fargo architect George Hancock and built by stonemason Nathaniel Maconachie. It was consecrated in August, 1887, and shared ministers with the Old Stone Church (Calvary Episcopal) in Buffalo for many years.

After the congregation dwindled, the building was sold in 1950 to the Casselton Mennonite Church, which worshiped in it until 2002, when the building was closed again. In 2004, the Mennonite congregation donated the church to the Casselton Heritage Center, Inc., which now operates it as a community center.

On December 3, 1992, it was added to the National Register of Historic Places.
