= St. Mary's Academy (Devils Lake, North Dakota) =

- U.S. National Register of Historic Places
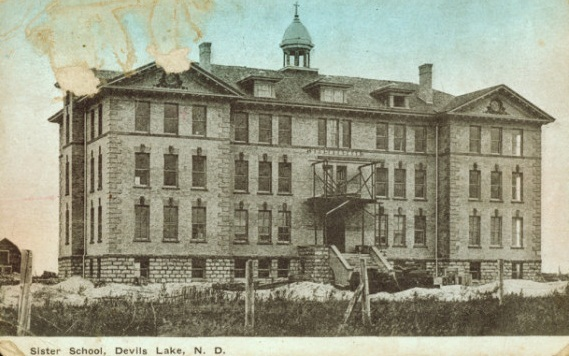
- St. Mary's Academy c. 1910

- Location within North Dakota Location within the United States
- Location: E. 7th St., Devils Lake, North Dakota
- Coordinates: 48°6′55″N 98°50′52″W
- Area: less than one acre
- Built: 1909
- Architect: Hancock Brothers
- Architectural style: Classical Revival
- NRHP reference No.: 83001939
- Added to NRHP: February 24, 1983

The St. Mary's Academy, also known as St. Mary's High School, is a historic three-story school built in 1909 in Devils Lake, North Dakota, United States. It was designed by the Hancock Brothers in Classical Revival style. the building's exterior facade is constructed from buff brick, light mottled Hebron brick, cut granite, and Kettle River sandstone. The facility operated as a Catholic boarding school from 1909 until the 1950s. A high school continued to operate in the building until 1979.

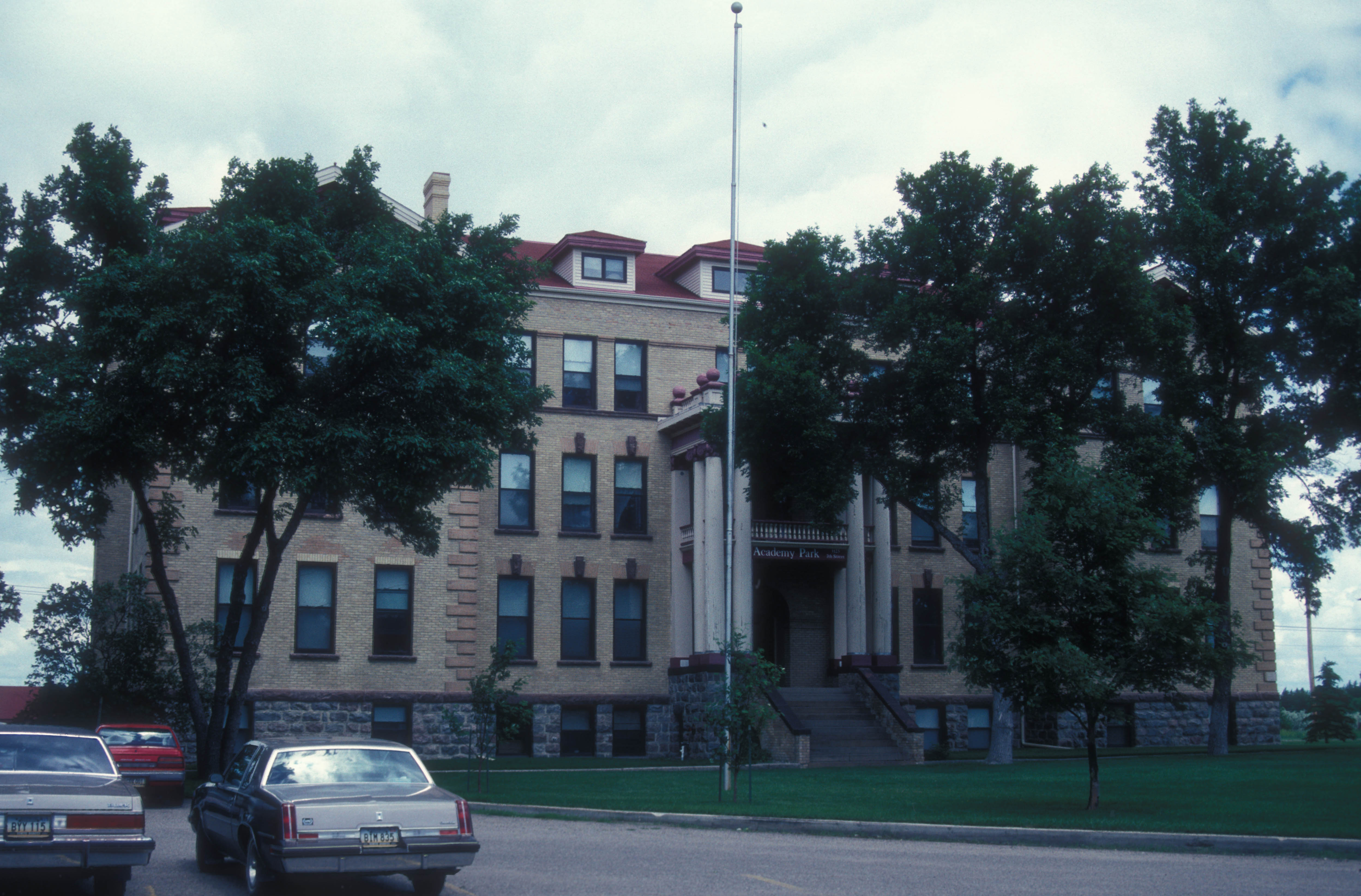
Building in 2007
