= 1916 Buffalo High School =

- U.S. National Register of Historic Places
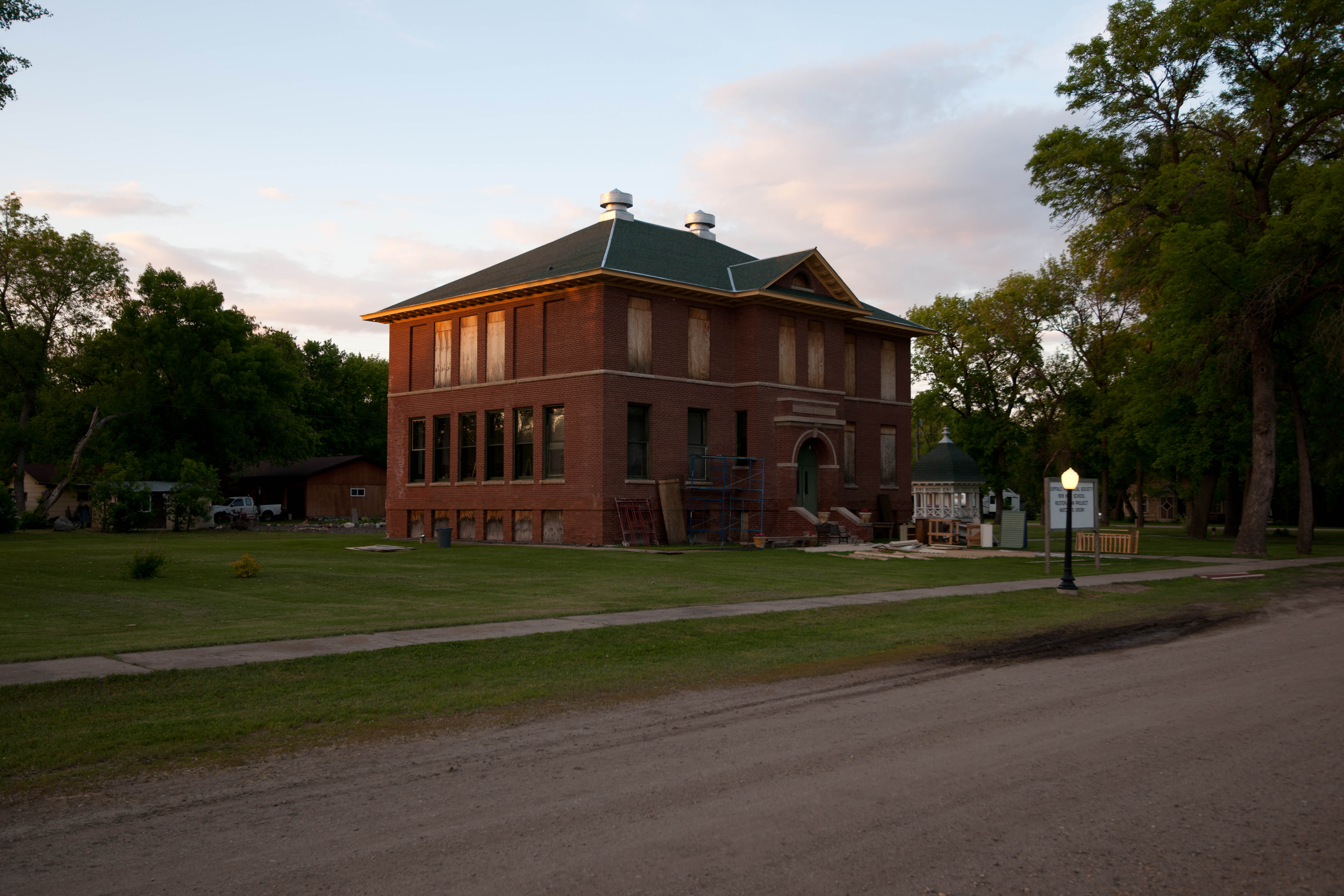
- School building in 2009

- Location within North Dakota Location within the United States
- Location: 303 Pearl St. N, Buffalo, North Dakota
- Coordinates: 46°55′16″N 97°32′59″W
- Area: less than 1 acre (0.40 ha)
- Built: 1916
- Architect: O'Shea, A.J.; Meineke Building Co.
- Architectural style: Classical Revival
- NRHP reference No.: 01000501
- Added to NRHP: May 10, 2001

The 1916 Buffalo High School, also known as Buffalo-Tower City Senior High School, is a property in Buffalo, North Dakota that was listed on the National Register of Historic Places (NRHP). It is located near the center of Buffalo, near the Old Stone Church which is also NRHP-listed.

It was built in 1916 in Classical Revival style, and was designed and/or built by A.J. O'Shea and Meineke Building Co.

At the time of the listing, the property was owned by the Buffalo Historical Society. The listing included one contributing building.
