= Knerr Block, Floyd Block, McHench Building and Webster and Coe Building =

- U.S. National Register of Historic Places
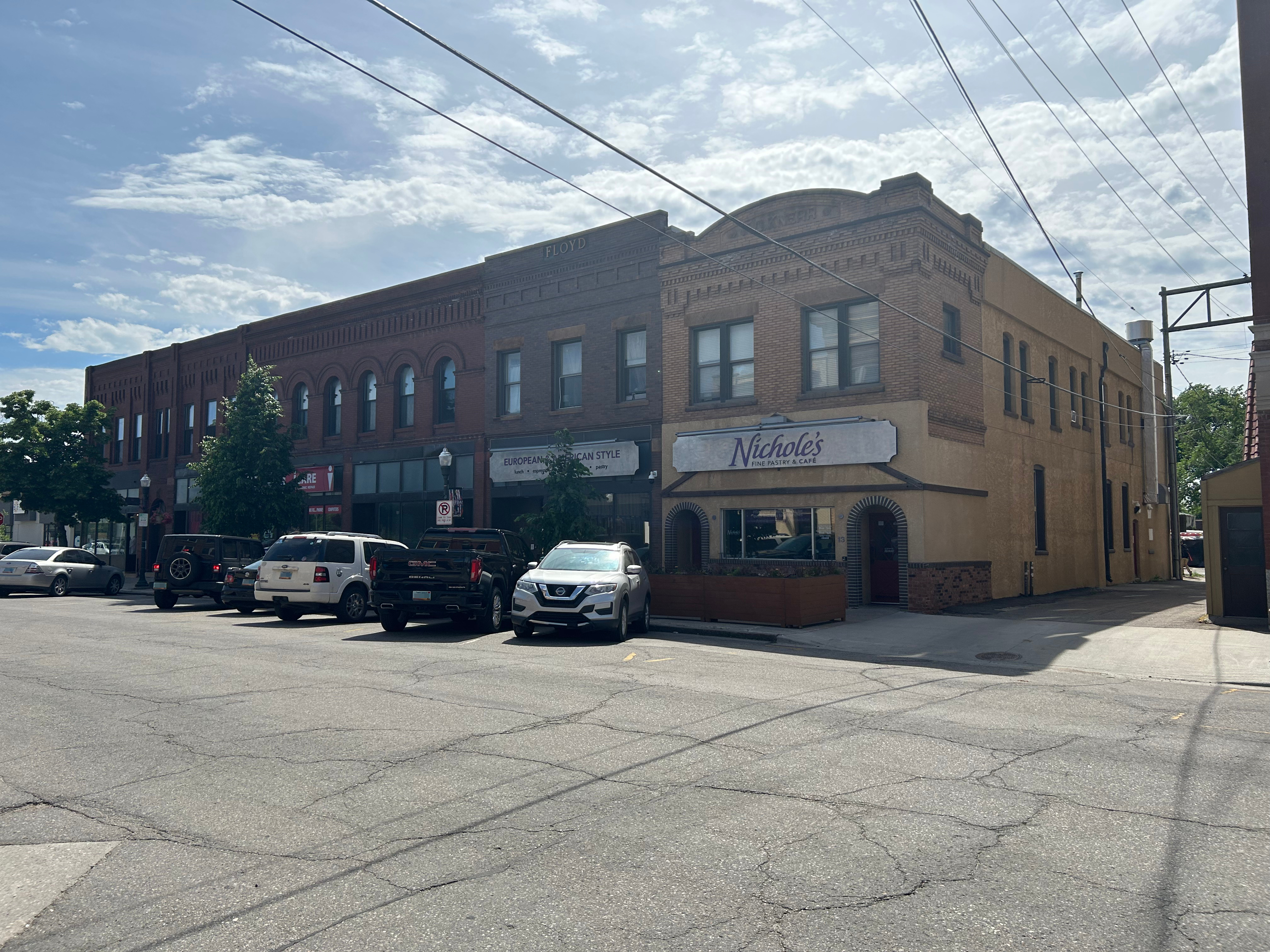

- Location within North Dakota Location within the United States
- Location: 13, 15, 17-19, and 21-23 8th St., S., Fargo, North Dakota
- Coordinates: 46°52′26″N 96°47′27″W
- Area: less than 1 acre (0.40 ha)
- Built: 1900, 1902, 1910
- Architect: Hancock Brothers
- NRHP reference No.: 83001930
- Added to NRHP: May 12, 1983

The Knerr Block, Floyd Block, McHench Building and Webster and Coe Building is a set of four buildings in Fargo, North Dakota that was listed on the National Register of Historic Places in 1983. The four buildings were built in 1900, 1902, and 1910. The oldest, the Webster and Coe building, was built in 1900 by a carpenter or contractor named Martel. The McHench Building was designed by the Hancock Brothers architects. The "four adjacent buildings constitute a solid front of excellent early turn-of-the-century commercial structures, displaying a continuity of fenestration and decorative brickwork."

The listed property includes just the four contributing buildings, on an area of less than 1 acre (0.40 ha).
