= Waldorf Hotel (Fargo, North Dakota) =

Hotel in Fargo, North Dakota, United States

Coordinates: 46°52′27.4″N 96°47′23.8″W

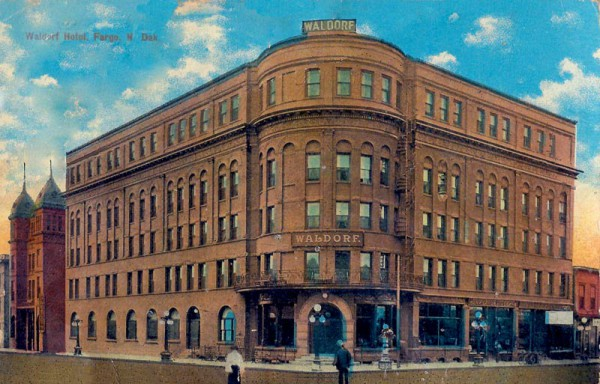
The Waldorf Hotel in 1911

The Waldorf Hotel (later known as the Milner Hotel and the Earle Hotel) was a hotel building in Fargo, North Dakota, US with entrances on Seventh and Front streets. It opened on April 1, 1899 and was demolished in 1951.

== History ==
It was built on the site of the old Sherman house, diagonally across Front street from the new Northern Pacific depot. It cost upwards of US$75,000, and the furniture $19,000. The capital was furnished largely by O. J. DeLendrecie, a Fargo merchant, who owned and operated the largest department store west of the Twin Cities.

The hotel's proprietor was R. R. Wise. It was leased and furnished by Samuel Mathews and George E. Nichols. Hancock Brothers of Fargo were the architects. The contractors were Stewart Wilson for the basement, and J.H. Bowers for the other parts of the structure.

The heating plant was installed by the Archambo Heating Company, Minneapolis. The bricks were furnished by the Twin Cities and the trimmings by the Portage Sandstone Company.

Messrs Ashelman Bros. & Prescott did the decorating with the exception of the dining room ceiling. They also did the paper hanging and painting. Milton Earl Beebe had supervision of the work.

The plumbing was done by the Fargo Plumbing Company, and was one of the largest jobs ever done in the city. An entire carload of bath tubs was imported by them for the contract.

The Mantel & Tile Company of Saint Paul, Minnesota, undertook the marble and tile work.

== Architecture and fitting ==
The exterior was 140 by 150 feet (43 m × 46 m), four stories and basement. It measured 61.13 feet (18.63 m) in height. The basement is of stone. The walls are pink pressed brick trimmed with Portland entry stone. There is an iron balcony of 70 feet (21 m) around the front. The Waldorf had 108 rooms besides 15 rooms for help. There were 40 suites with baths and 15 rooms with hot and cold water. There were return bells in every room and telephone connection with the office from several of the leading suites. The elevator was run by electricity making it at the time the only hotel in the state that had this feature. The house was heated by steam throughout. The rooms were large. The floor was of mosaic tile, the wainscoting, counter and desk were of white and grey marble. The office measured 75 by 100 feet (23 m × 30 m). The fireplace contained a carved mantel of oak. There were immense plate glass windows. The arches were carved.

The upper floors were reached by a broad staircase of steel and marble, and by an electric elevator. The furniture cost upwards of $19.000; it was of solid mahogany and oak, with a few suites being of bird's-eye maple. There were six parlors en suite. The fourth floor was exclusively for regular boarders, and fitted with closets and other conveniences necessary for home life. The bedsteads on the second floor were of brass, and the floors above were iron with brass trimmings.

The dining room was 40 by 75 feet (12 m × 23 m). It had arched windows draped with curtains. The ceiling was tinted and frescoed in floral designs. At one end of the dining room, there were two alcoves, which were entered through carved arches. The dining room furniture included a sideboard. The china was decorated, and the silver was of the modern design. The room had a maple floor. The kitchen was modern. The laundry and ice house were in the basement. Quarters for the help were housed in an annex. Just off from the office and close to the Seventh street entrance there was a ladies' waiting room which contained a writing desk and an Oriental rug. West of the office was a drug store, 27 by 60 feet (8.2 m × 18.3 m), with an opening into the office, and west of that a jewelry store, 24 by 30 feet (7.3 m × 9.1 m).
