= Grace Episcopal Church (Minnewaukan, North Dakota) =

Historic church in North Dakota, United States

- U.S. National Register of Historic Places
- Location within North Dakota Location within the United States
- Location: 210 C Ave. S., Minnewaukan, North Dakota
- Coordinates: 48°4′14″N 99°14′51″W
- Area: less than one acre
- Built: 1903
- Architect: The Hancock Brothers; Builder = Otis Kolstad
- Architectural style: Late Gothic Revival
- MPS: Episcopal Churches of North Dakota MPS
- NRHP reference No.: 94001072
- Added to NRHP: September 9, 1994

Grace Episcopal Church is a historic Episcopal church building is located at 210 C Avenue, South, in Minnewaukan, Benson County, North Dakota.

== History ==
Designed in the Gothic Revival style of architecture by Fargo architects Hancock Brothers, it was built by local artisan Otis Kolstad in 1903 of local fieldstone with concrete mortar and wooden gables and roof. It features a stone bell tower over the side entrance. In 1935 the building was sold to Union Gospel Tabernacle, an Assemblies of God congregation which shared it with St. Peter Lutheran Church. In 1965 it was sold to Evergreen Masonic Lodge No. 46, A.F. and A.M., which did extensive renovations, including superimposing the Masonic square and compass emblem over the circular stained glass window.

In 1983 the North Dakota Masonic Foundation deeded the property to Minnewaukan Historical Society, Inc., which has restored it and removed some of the changes made by the Masonic Lodge. On September 9, 1994, it was added to the National Register of Historic Places. Today it is called the Stone Church Museum and is still owned by the Historical Society.
