= Seiler Building =

- U.S. National Register of Historic Places
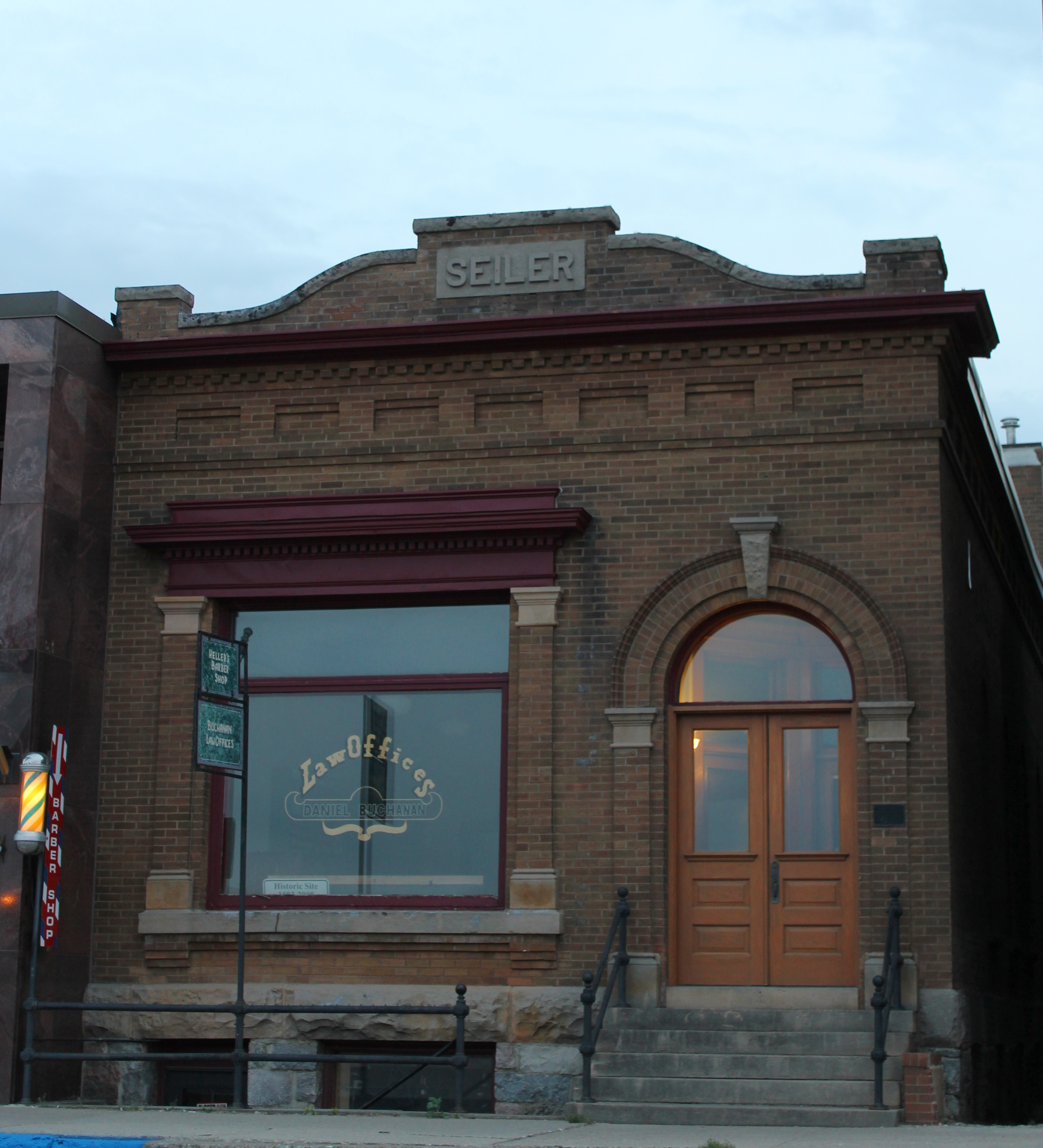

- Location within North Dakota Location within the United States
- Location: 110 First St. E, Jamestown, North Dakota
- Coordinates: 46°54′30″N 98°42′25″W
- Area: less than one acre
- Built: 1904
- Architect: Hancock, George & Walter
- Architectural style: Beaux Arts
- NRHP reference No.: 86000080
- Added to NRHP: January 16, 1986

The Seiler Building on First St. E. in Jamestown, North Dakota was built in 1904. It was designed by George & Walter Hancock.

It was listed on the National Register of Historic Places (NRHP) in 1986.

According to its NRHP nomination, the building was nominated due to its association with O. J. Seller and architects George and Walter Hancock, its Beaux Arts architecture, and its "fine integrity of design, materials, workmanship, feeling and association."
