= Grace Episcopal Church (Pembina, North Dakota) =

Historic church in North Dakota, United States

- U.S. National Register of Historic Places
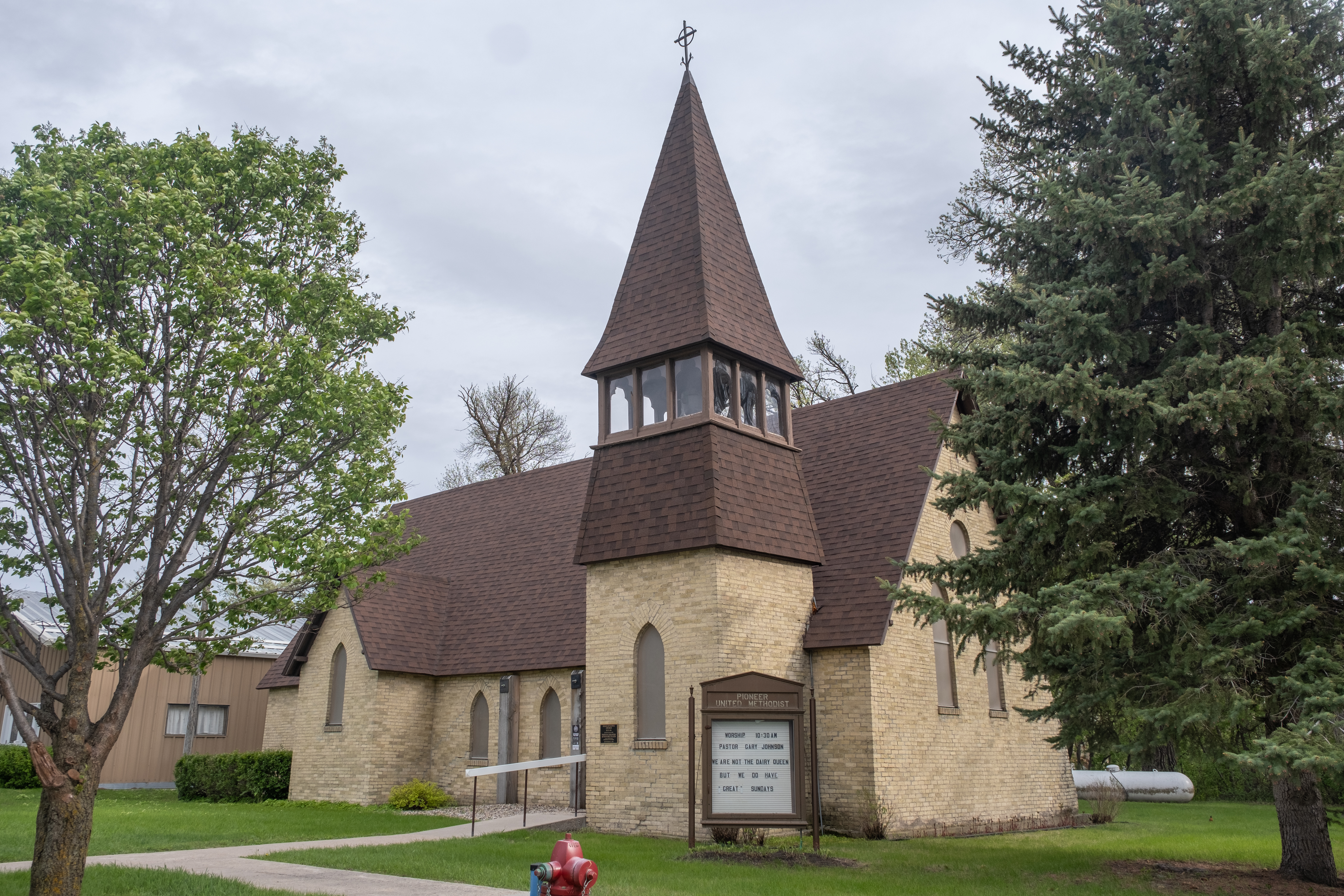

- Location within North Dakota Location within the United States
- Location: 152 Ramsey St. W., Pembina, North Dakota
- Coordinates: 48°57′57″N 97°14′45″W
- Area: less than one acre
- Built: 1886
- Architect: George Hancock
- Architectural style: Late Gothic Revival
- MPS: Episcopal Churches of North Dakota MPS
- NRHP reference No.: 94001075
- Added to NRHP: September 2, 1994

Grace Episcopal Church is an historic Episcopal church building located at 152 Ramsey Street, West in Pembina, Pembina County, North Dakota. Designed in the Late Gothic Revival style of architecture by Fargo architect George Hancock, it was built in 1886. Unlike all the other churches in the Episcopal Churches of North Dakota Multiple Property Submission (MPS), it was built of brick instead of local fieldstone. The brick is yellow and was made locally by the Pembina Brick Company. The church building is one of only three extant building built of this brick. In 1937 Grace Church closed due to declining attendance and the building was sold by the Episcopal Diocese of North Dakota to the local Methodist congregation. Today it is the Pembina Pioneer Memorial United Methodist Church. On September 2, 1994, the building was added to the National Register of Historic Places as Grace Episcopal Church.

== Current use ==
Pembina Pioneer Memorial United Methodist Church is still active. Its pastor is the Rev. Gary H. Johnson.
