= Episcopal Church of the Advent and Guild Hall =

Historic church in North Dakota, United States

- Episcopal Church of the Advent--Guild Hall
- U.S. National Register of Historic Places
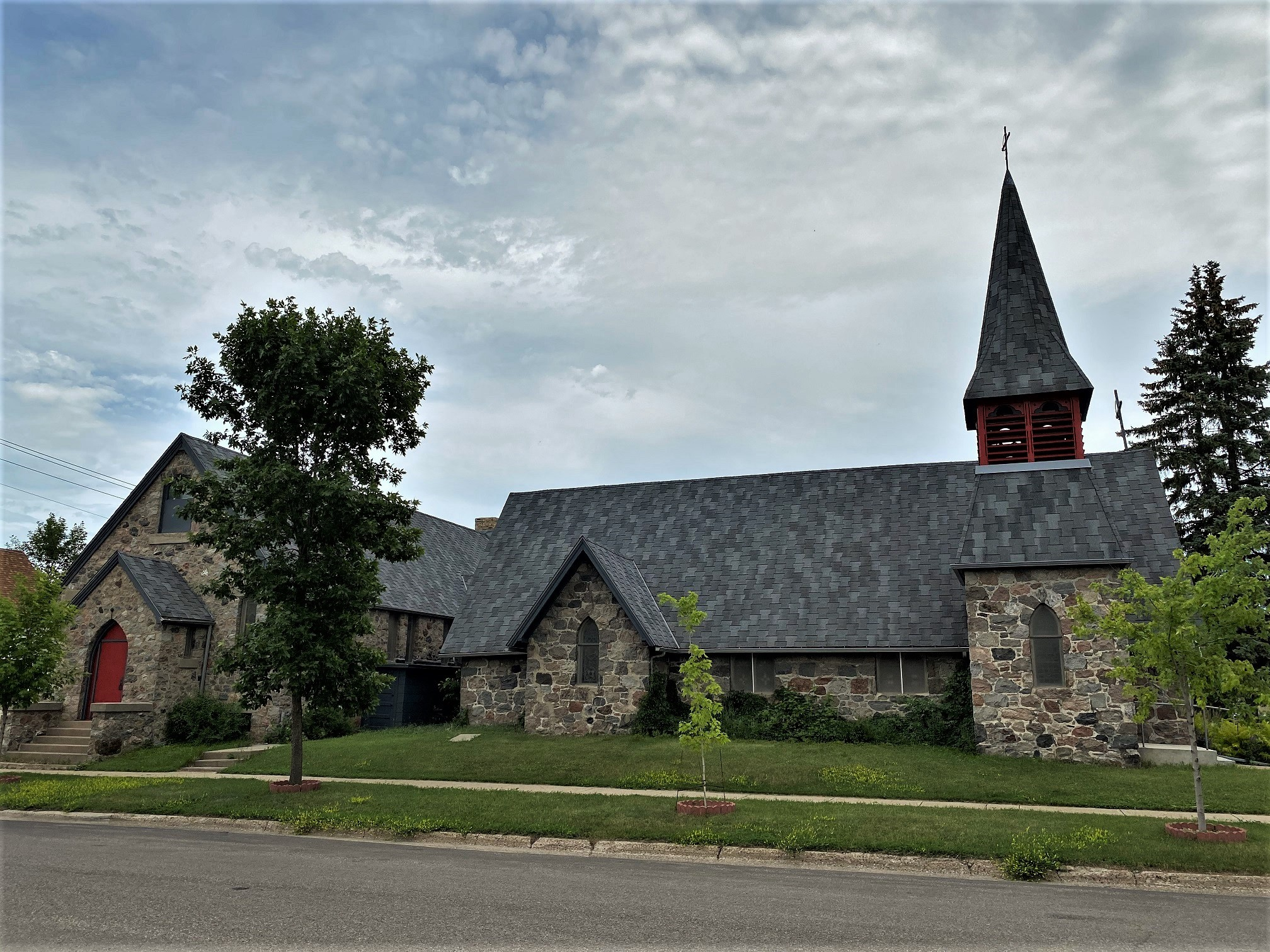

- Location within North Dakota Location within the United States
- Location: 501 6th St. E. Devil's Lake, North Dakota
- Coordinates: 48°6′51″N 98°51′29″W
- Area: less than one acre
- Built: 1886
- Architect: George Hancock
- Architectural style: Late Gothic Revival
- MPS: Episcopal Churches of North Dakota MPS
- NRHP reference No.: 02000669
- Added to NRHP: June 20, 2002

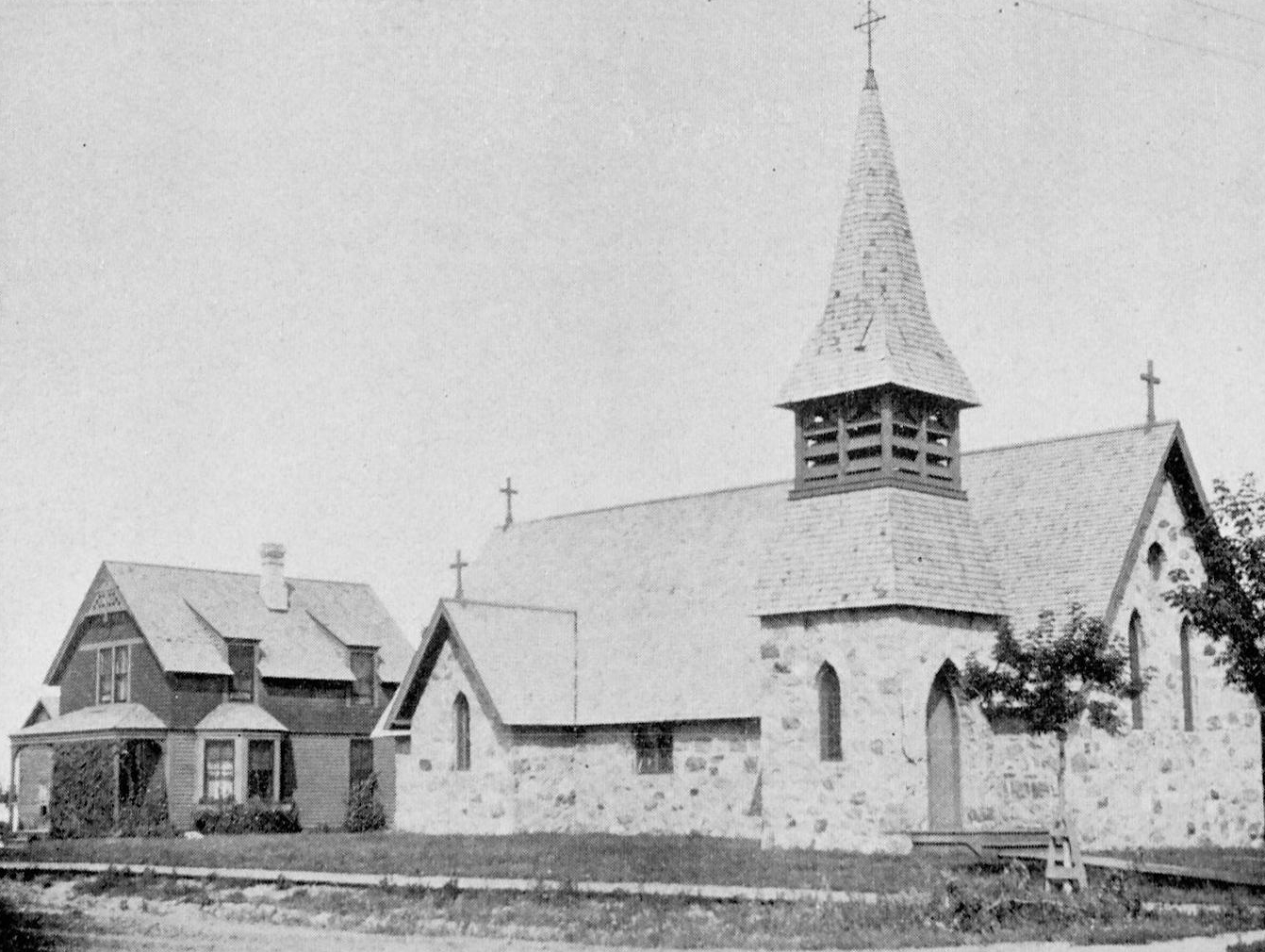
Episcopal Church of the Advent in Devils Lake, N.D., circa 1898

The Episcopal Church of the Advent-Guild Hall on 6th St. E. in Devils Lake, North Dakota was built in 1886. It has also been known as Stone Church. The building was listed on the National Register of Historic Places in 2002. The church is part of the Episcopal Diocese of North Dakota.

It was designed in the Second Late Gothic Revival style by North Dakota architect George Hancock. It was the first church built in Devils Lake, arriving about when the railroad did.

In 2015, the church reported 32 members; in 2023, it reported 32 members. No membership statistics were reported in 2024 national parochial reports. Average Sunday Attendance (ASA) reported in 2024 was 13 persons.
