= St. Michael's Hospital and Nurses' Residence =

- U.S. National Register of Historic Places
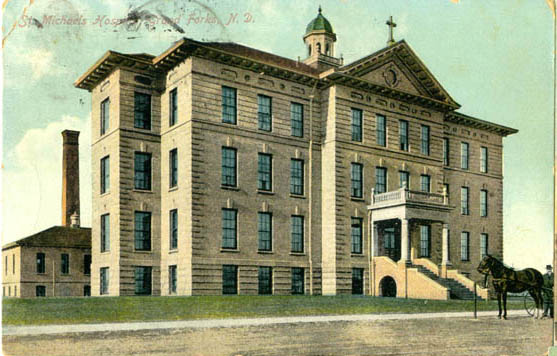

- Location within North Dakota Location within the United States
- Location: 813 Lewis Blvd., Grand Forks, North Dakota
- Coordinates: 47°55′57″N 97°2′22″W
- Area: 3.3 acres (1.3 ha)
- Built: 1907 and 1913
- Architect: George Hancock; et al.
- Architectural style: Classical Revival
- NRHP reference No.: 95000468
- Added to NRHP: April 20, 1995

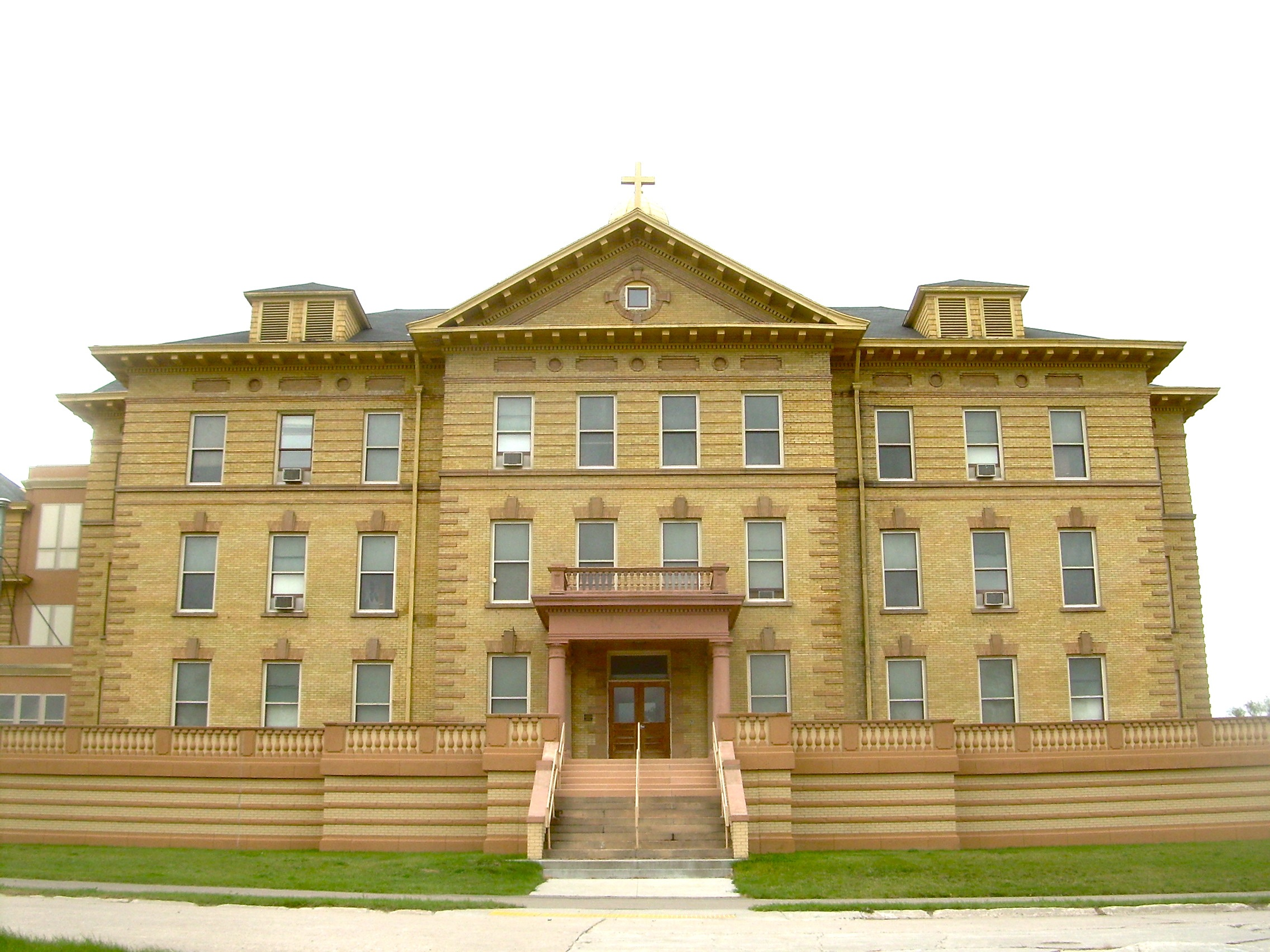
Building in 2010

St. Michael's Hospital and Nurses' Residence is a property in Grand Forks, North Dakota that was listed on the National Register of Historic Places in 1995. It was also known as St. Anne's Guest Home and denoted 32GF14, it was builtin 1907. It was designed by architect George Hancock (1849- 1924). Grand Forks architect William J. Edwards designed the Nurses' Residence in 1913.

It includes Classical Revival architecture. When listed the property included two contributing buildings. The listing is for an area of 3.3 acres (1.3 ha). The listing is described in its NRHP nomination document. The property is now known as "Riverside Manor". St. Anne's Guest Home relocated to North 17th Street in the 1981 because they were unable to comply with fire codes in the old building.

The building survived the 1997 Red River flood, but was nearly torn down to make way for new dikes. However, the U.S. Army Corps of Engineers was able to design a flood wall that would preserve the building.

In 2015 a $1.4 million renovation began, focusing on the bricks, roof, and windows. All 191 windows in the building were replaced.

== Related reading ==
- Clement Augustus Lounsberry (1919) Early History of North Dakota: Essential Outlines of American History (Liberty Press)
