= St. Michael's Church (Grand Forks, North Dakota) =

Historic church in North Dakota, United States

- U.S. National Register of Historic Places
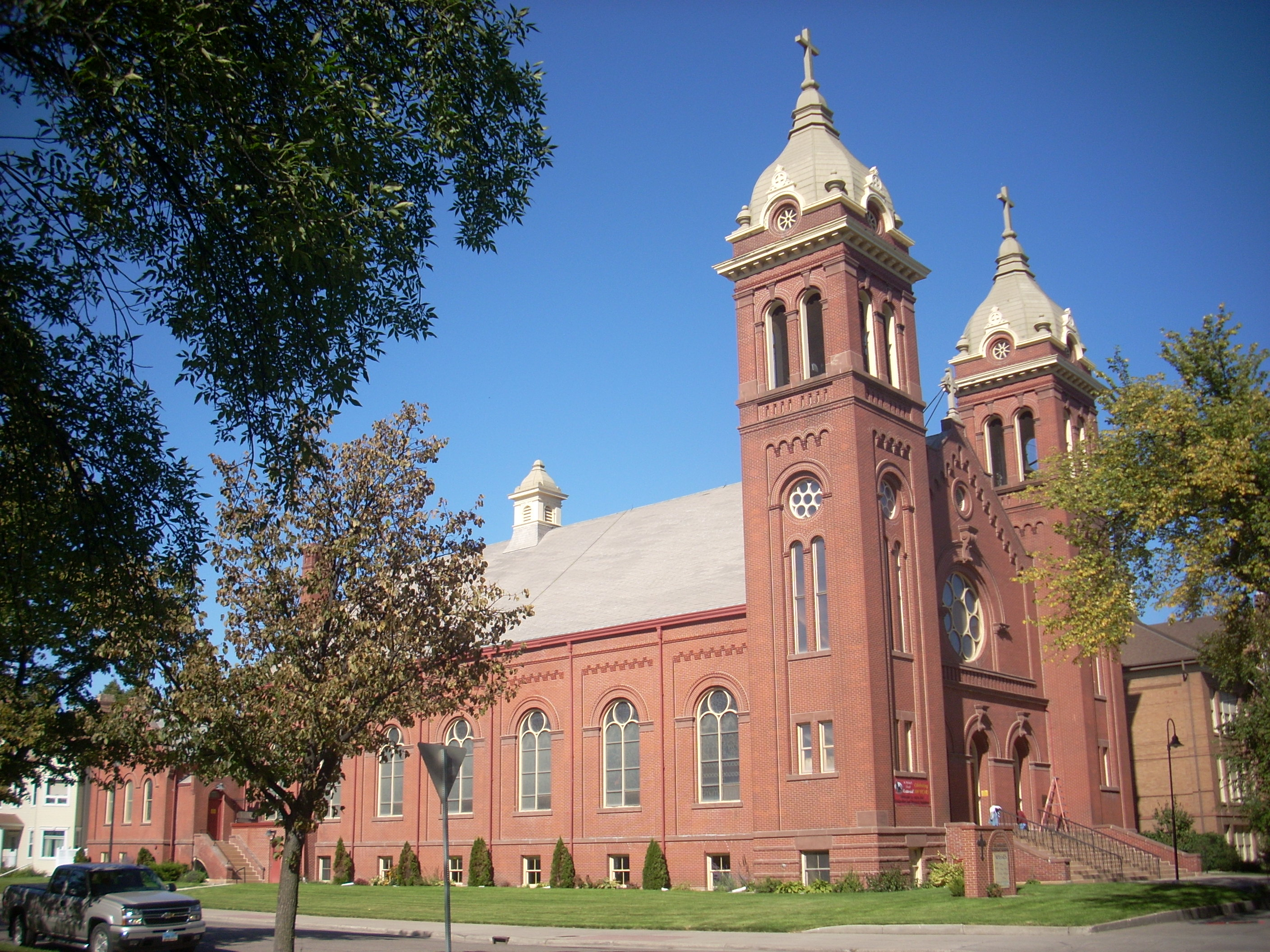

- Location within North Dakota Location within the United States
- Location: 520 N. Sixth St., Grand Forks, North Dakota
- Coordinates: 47°55′36″N 97°2′23″W
- Area: less than 1 acre (0.40 ha)
- Built: 1908-1909
- Architect: Hancock Bros.
- Architectural style: Romanesque
- NRHP reference No.: 88000983
- Added to NRHP: June 30, 1988

St. Michael's Church is a property in Grand Forks, North Dakota that was listed on the National Register of Historic Places in 1988.

It was built during 1908–1909, and includes Romanesque architecture.

It was designed by the Hancock Bros. and built by E.C. Richmond.
