= St. James Episcopal Church and Rectory (Bozeman, Montana) =

Historic church in Montana, United States

- U.S. National Register of Historic Places
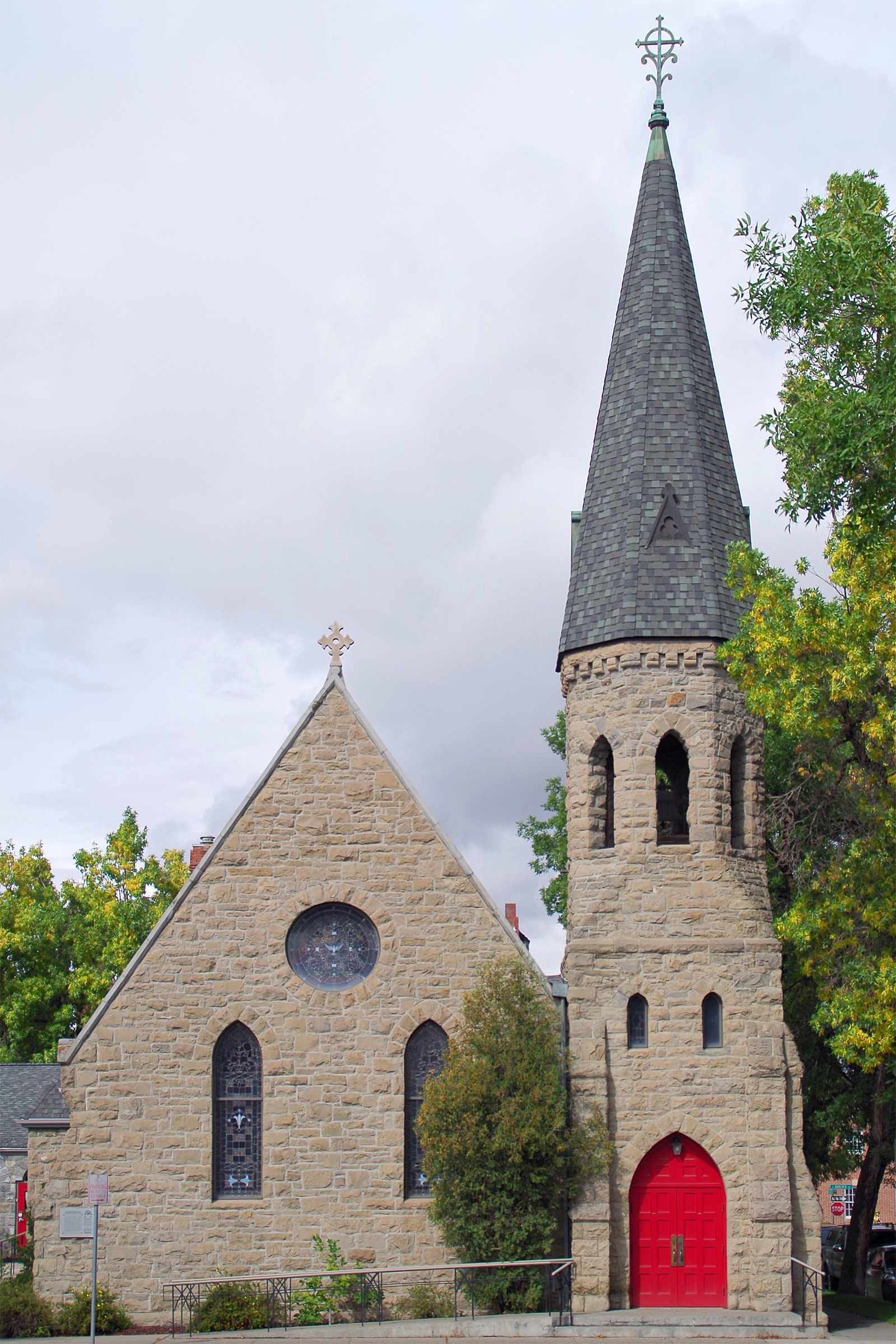
- Photographed in 2013

- Location within Montana Location within the United States
- Location: 9 W. Olive, Bozeman, Montana
- Coordinates: 45°40′40″N 111°02′12″W
- Area: less than one acre
- Built: 1883 (rectory); 1889-90 (church)
- Built by: James S. Campbell
- Architect: George Hancock
- Architectural style: Gothic Revival (church); Colonial Revival (in some details of rectory)
- MPS: Bozeman MRA
- NRHP reference No.: 87001841
- Added to NRHP: October 23, 1987

The St. James Episcopal Church and Rectory in Bozeman, Montana was listed on the National Register of Historic Places in 1987. The listing included two contributing buildings (the church and the rectory). The church is part of the Episcopal Diocese of Montana.

In 2021, the church reported 624 members; in 2023, it reported 261 members. No membership statistics were reported in 2024 national parochial reports. Plate and pledge financial support reported by the church in 2024 was $312,989. Average Sunday Attendance (ASA) reported by the church in 2024 was 77 persons. This was a relative decrease from ASA of 182 persons reported in 2016.

== History and building ==
The church and rectory are "significant for their association with the early social history of Bozeman." Episcopal services were held in Bozeman by 1868, and a church site was secured in 1869, and a wood frame and board and batten church was completed in 1876.

Construction of the brick rectory, at 5 W. Olive, was begun in the early 1880s and completed in 1883. It was built in a transitional Italianate/Queen Anne style, but many details were replaced by plainer Colonial Revival elements in the 1930s.

The current church building, at 5 W. Olive in Bozeman, was built during 1889–90. It was designed by regional architect George Hancock of Fargo, North Dakota, who had opened a branch office in Bozeman by the late 1880s. It is a cruciform-plan Gothic Revival church built of grey sandstone pointed with blue mortar. It is 80 by 30 feet (24.4 m × 9.1 m) in plan, and the top of the copper cross on its steeple is 80 feet (24 m) from the ground. Its two main gables are each 40 feet (12 m) high, and each is surmounted by a stone cross.
