= St Anne's Guest Home =

Coordinates: 47.9249°N 97.0502°W

St. Anne's is a Catholic health care facility in Grand Forks, North Dakota, operated by sisters belonging to the Franciscan Sisters of Dillingen. It has been in operation since the mid-1940s and is currently in its third location. The home offers two levels of services for residents; basic care and affordable housing. The affordable housing unit is a separate non-profit, called "St. Anne's Housing for the Elderly."

== History ==
St. Anne's Guest Home was founded in 1945 in Fargo, North Dakota, to address the needs of the elderly and vulnerable in the community. The original facility in Fargo had 20 beds.

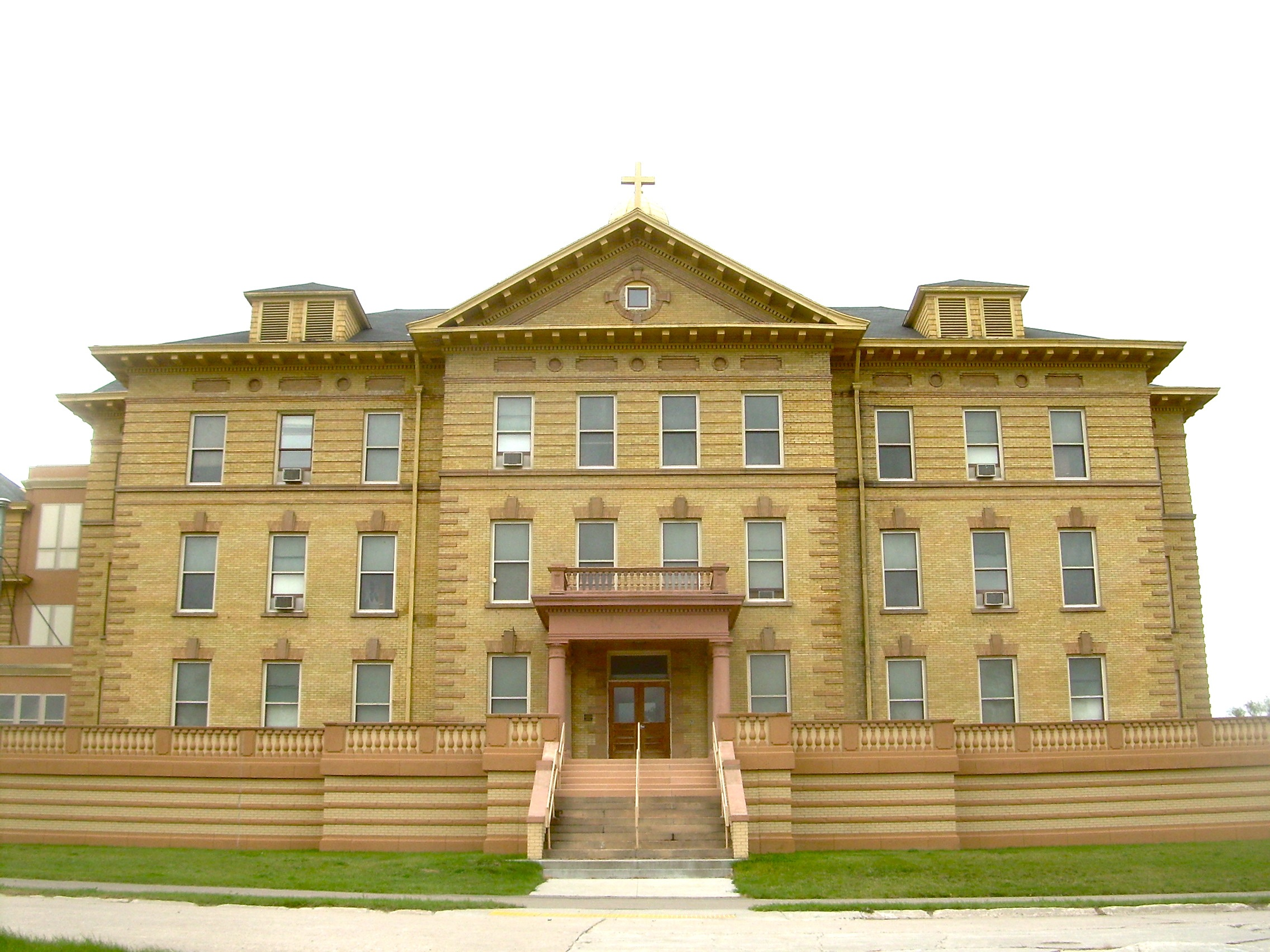
St. Anne's second location, St. Michael's Hospital and Nurses' Residence, is now on the National Register of Historic Places.

In 1952 St. Anne's Guest Home moved to Grand Forks, converting St. Michael's Hospital and Nurses' Residence, built in 1907, into a 100-bed facility. St. Anne's remained in this building until 1978 when they were forced to seek a new facility due to their inability to comply with fire safety codes in the old building.

In 1981 St. Anne's re-opened in a building that had previously been a convent. The new building had two wings, a north wing and a south wing. The South wing contains 47 "basic care units" and the North wing contains 30 low-rent efficiency apartments.

St. Anne's sustained some damage in the 1997 Red River flood, including the loss of the equipment they had used to make ice cream for their annual ice cream social. Nevertheless, they continued the tradition of hosting an annual ice cream social, which had begun in the 1980s. The ice cream social regularly draws crowds of 200 people.

== Services ==
=== Basic care ===
St. Anne's basic care wing is a licensed basic care facility. Basic care facilities in North Dakota are those "whose focus is to provide room and board and health, social, and personal care to assist the residents to attain or maintain their highest level of functioning." St. Anne's "provides services designed to meet the physical, social, psychological, and spiritual needs of men and women 18 years of age and older." Residents must be ambulatory, but assistance is provided with some activities of daily living, such as housekeeping, laundry, and food preparation.

=== Affordable Housing ===
In addition to the basic care wing, St. Anne's also has 30 subsidized housing units available to persons with limited income who are 62 or older or disabled. These units are subsidized by the Housing and Urban Development (HUD) program.

In recent years, the facility has been utilizing the phrase "St. Anne's Living Center" to encompass both of these units in a more descriptive, recognizable way.
