= Elliot–Powers House and Garage =

Historic house in North Dakota, United States

- Location within North Dakota Location within the United States
- 46.883610°N 96.788278°W
- Location: 702-704 Broadway, Fargo, North Dakota

History
- Built: 1900
- Built by: Fargo Cornice and Ornament Co.

Site notes
- Area: less than 1 acre (0.40 ha)
- Architect: Hancock Brothers
- Architectural style: Queen Anne

The Elliot–Powers House and Garage is a property in Fargo, North Dakota that was determined eligible for listing on the National Register of Historic Places on April 7, 1987, with reference number 87002634. It was not, however, actually listed, due to owner objection. Its listing status is "DO/Owner Objection".

== History ==
It was built in 1900 in Queen Anne style for Peter Elliot, a prominent hotelier and restaurant owner. It was designed by the Hancock Brothers and built at least in part by the Fargo Cornice and Ornament Co.

The property included two contributing buildings on an area of less than 1 acre (0.40 ha). The property was included in a multiple-resource nomination of historic properties on the north side of Fargo.
