= Hebron, North Dakota =

- City
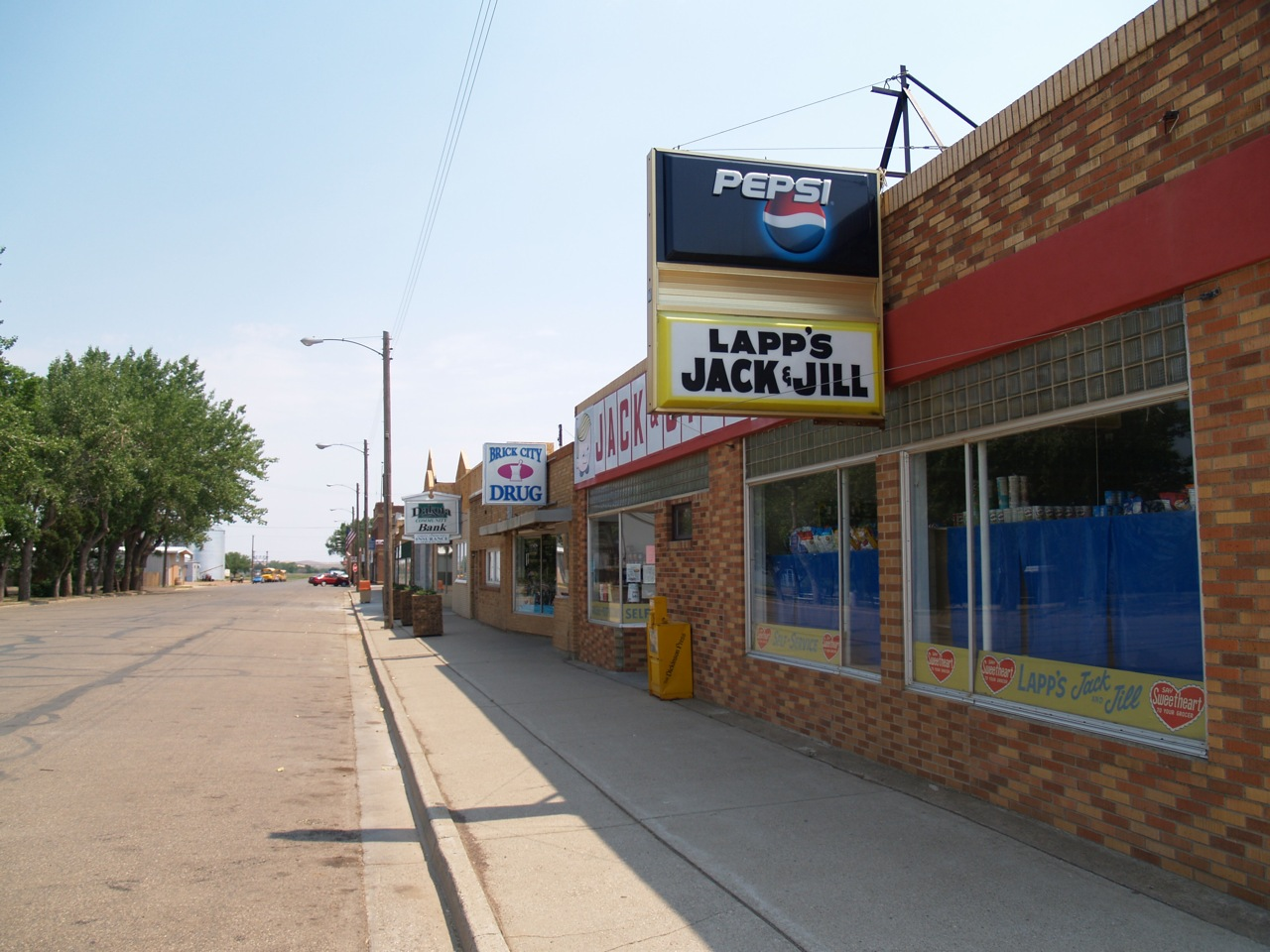
- Storefronts in Hebron, North Dakota
- Nickname: The Brick City
- Location of Hebron, North Dakota
- Coordinates: 46°54′08″N 102°02′40″W
- Country: United States
- State: North Dakota
- County: Morton
- Established: 1880's
- Founded: 1885
- Incorporated: 1916

Government
  - Mayor: Grant Walth

Area
  - Total: 1.50 sq mi (3.89 km^{2})
  - Land: 1.50 sq mi (3.89 km^{2})
  - Water: 0 sq mi (0.00 km^{2})
- Elevation: 2,162 ft (659 m)

Population (2020)
  - Total: 794
  - Estimate (2022): 788
  - Density: 528.5/sq mi (204.06/km^{2})
- Time zone: UTC-6 (Central (CST))
  - Summer (DST): UTC-5 (CDT)
- ZIP code: 58638
- Area code: 701
- FIPS code: 38-36860
- GNIS feature ID: 1036090
- Website: hebronnd.org

Hebron (/ˈhiːbrən/ HEE-brən) is a city in Morton County, North Dakota, United States. It is part of the "Bismarck, ND Metropolitan Statistical Area" or "Bismarck-Mandan". The population was 794 at the 2020 census.

Hebron was founded in 1885 and named after the West Bank city of Hebron. The first influx of settlers came from Johannestal, Crimea, in southwestern Russia.

Hebron Brick Company was founded in the city.

== Geography ==
According to the United States Census Bureau, the city has a total area of 1.49 square miles (3.86 km^{2}), all of it land.

== Demographics ==
Historical population
Census	Pop.	Note	%±
1910	597		—
1920	1,374		130.2%
1930	1,348		−1.9%
1940	1,267		−6.0%
1950	1,412		11.4%
1960	1,340		−5.1%
1970	1,103		−17.7%
1980	1,078		−2.3%
1990	888		−17.6%
2000	803		−9.6%
2010	747		−7.0%
2020	794		6.3%
2022 (est.)	788		−0.8%
U.S. Decennial Census; 2020 Census

=== 2010 census ===
As of the census of 2010, there were 747 people, 330 households, and 211 families residing in the city. The population density was 501.3 inhabitants per square mile (193.6/km^{2}). There were 396 housing units at an average density of 265.8 per square mile (102.6/km^{2}). The racial makeup of the city was 96.5% White, 0.7% Native American, 0.1% Asian, 0.1% Pacific Islander, 0.1% from other races, and 2.4% from two or more races. Hispanic or Latino of any race were 1.9% of the population.

There were 330 households, of which 27.9% had children under the age of 18 living with them, 52.1% were married couples living together, 7.3% had a female householder with no husband present, 4.5% had a male householder with no wife present, and 36.1% were non-families. 32.7% of all households were made up of individuals, and 17.9% had someone living alone who was 65 years of age or older. The average household size was 2.26 and the average family size was 2.85.

The median age in the city was 44.8 years. 25.3% of residents were under the age of 18; 4.4% were between the ages of 18 and 24; 20.5% were from 25 to 44; 30.2% were from 45 to 64; and 19.7% were 65 years of age or older. The gender makeup of the city was 52.5% male and 47.5% female.

=== 2000 census ===
As of the census of 2000, there were 803 people, 357 households, and 228 families residing in the city. The population density was 539.2 inhabitants per square mile (208.2/km^{2}). There were 434 housing units at an average density of 291.4 per square mile (112.5/km^{2}). The racial makeup of the city was 95.77% White, 0.87% Native American, 0.75% Asian, 1.12% from other races, and 1.49% from two or more races. Hispanic or Latino of any race were 1.12% of the population.

There were 357 households, out of which 25.8% had children under the age of 18 living with them, 56.0% were married couples living together, 5.3% had a female householder with no husband present, and 36.1% were non-families. 34.5% of all households were made up of individuals, and 20.7% had someone living alone who was 65 years of age or older. The average household size was 2.25 and the average family size was 2.90.

In the city, the population was spread out, with 24.8% under the age of 18, 4.0% from 18 to 24, 21.8% from 25 to 44, 22.8% from 45 to 64, and 26.7% who were 65 years of age or older. The median age was 45 years. For every 100 females, there were 86.7 males. For every 100 females age 18 and over, there were 83.6 males.

The median income for a household in the city was $22,283, and the median income for a family was $30,536. Males had a median income of $24,904 versus $16,818 for females. The per capita income for the city was $12,463. About 7.5% of families and 12.0% of the population were below the poverty line, including 8.1% of those under age 18 and 15.4% of those age 65 or over.

== Notable Person ==
- Gwen Sebastian - Singer-songwriter from The Voice.

== Climate ==
This climatic region is typified by large seasonal temperature differences, with warm to hot (and often humid) summers and cold (sometimes severely cold) winters. According to the Köppen Climate Classification system, Hebron has a humid continental climate, abbreviated "Dfb" on climate maps.

Climate data for Hebron, North Dakota (1991–2020 normals, extremes 1963–present)
Month	Jan	Feb	Mar	Apr	May	Jun	Jul	Aug	Sep	Oct	Nov	Dec	Year
Record high °F (°C)	63 (17)	67 (19)	81 (27)	94 (34)	98 (37)	105 (41)	109 (43)	105 (41)	106 (41)	96 (36)	80 (27)	66 (19)	109 (43)
Mean daily maximum °F (°C)	23.6 (−4.7)	27.9 (−2.3)	39.6 (4.2)	53.7 (12.1)	65.8 (18.8)	74.9 (23.8)	82.3 (27.9)	82.1 (27.8)	71.5 (21.9)	55.6 (13.1)	39.8 (4.3)	28.3 (−2.1)	53.8 (12.1)
Daily mean °F (°C)	13.4 (−10.3)	17.2 (−8.2)	28.3 (−2.1)	40.6 (4.8)	52.8 (11.6)	62.6 (17.0)	68.7 (20.4)	67.3 (19.6)	57.2 (14.0)	42.8 (6.0)	29.1 (−1.6)	18.3 (−7.6)	41.5 (5.3)
Mean daily minimum °F (°C)	3.2 (−16.0)	6.6 (−14.1)	16.9 (−8.4)	27.6 (−2.4)	39.9 (4.4)	50.2 (10.1)	55.2 (12.9)	52.6 (11.4)	42.9 (6.1)	30.0 (−1.1)	18.3 (−7.6)	8.3 (−13.2)	29.3 (−1.5)
Record low °F (°C)	−47 (−44)	−37 (−38)	−29 (−34)	−14 (−26)	9 (−13)	28 (−2)	34 (1)	29 (−2)	12 (−11)	−7 (−22)	−23 (−31)	−38 (−39)	−47 (−44)
Average precipitation inches (mm)	0.41 (10)	0.48 (12)	0.86 (22)	1.51 (38)	2.58 (66)	3.30 (84)	2.86 (73)	2.00 (51)	1.89 (48)	1.48 (38)	0.62 (16)	0.43 (11)	18.42 (468)
Average snowfall inches (cm)	5.2 (13)	6.2 (16)	7.4 (19)	4.0 (10)	0.8 (2.0)	0.0 (0.0)	0.0 (0.0)	0.0 (0.0)	0.2 (0.51)	2.5 (6.4)	6.6 (17)	7.7 (20)	40.6 (103)
Average precipitation days (≥ 0.01 in)	3.7	3.9	4.9	7.4	10.5	11.3	9.1	7.3	7.0	6.3	3.9	4.8	80.1
Average snowy days (≥ 0.1 in)	4.1	4.5	3.9	1.6	0.4	0.0	0.0	0.0	0.1	1.1	3.1	4.5	23.3
Source: NOAA

== See also ==
- German Evangelical St. Johns Church (Hebron, North Dakota)
