= Old Stone Church (Buffalo, North Dakota) =

Historic church in North Dakota, United States

- U.S. National Register of Historic Places
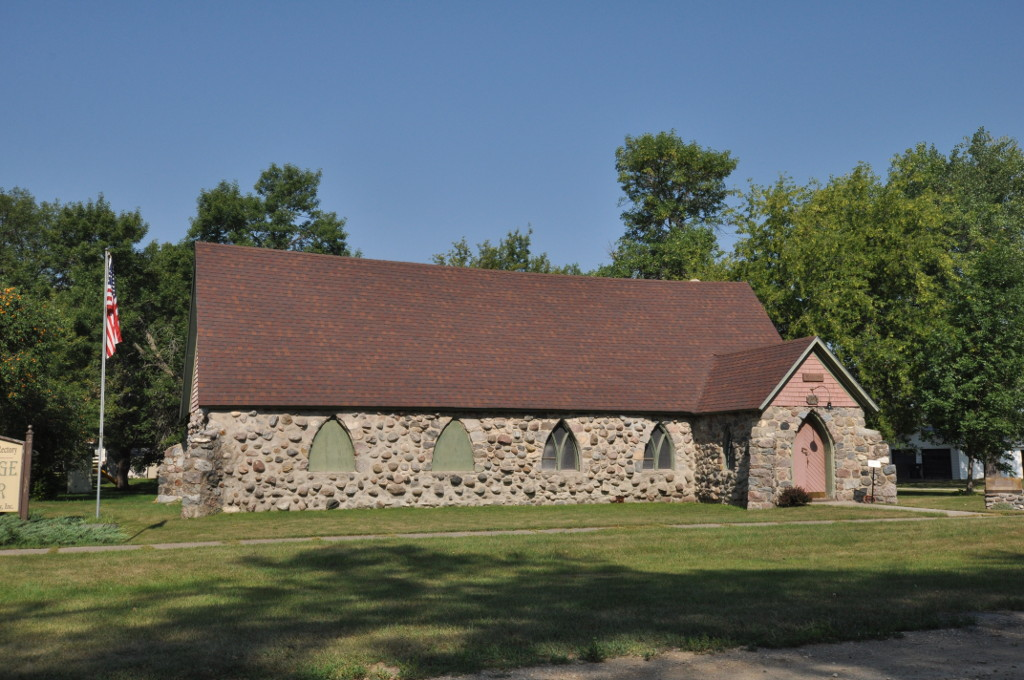

- Location within North Dakota Location within the United States
- Location: 206 N Wilcox Ave., Buffalo, North Dakota
- Coordinates: 46°55′18″N 97°33′3″W
- Built: 1885
- Architect: George Hancock; Angus Beaton
- Architectural style: Late Gothic Revival
- MPS: Episcopal Churches of North Dakota MPS
- NRHP reference No.: 96000311
- Added to NRHP: March 29, 1996

The former Old Stone Church, also known as Calvary Episcopal Chapel, is an historic stone Late Gothic Revival-style Episcopal church building located at 206 North Wilcox Avenue in Buffalo, North Dakota. Built in 1885, it was designed by British architect George Hancock and built by Angus Beaton. Calvary Episcopal Chapel held its first services on October 15, 1886. In 1934, after years of many closings and reopenings, Calvary closed for the final time. In 1936, the building was bought by Buffalo Lodge No. 77 of the Ancient, Free & Accepted Masons. In the 1970s Buffalo No. 77 closed and in 1982 was merged with Casselton Lodge No. 3. In 1985, the Masons donated it to the Buffalo Historical Society, which 10 years later restored it. It is now called the Old Stone Church Heritage Center. On October 22, 1995, the Buffalo Historical Society received national recognition for its efforts from the National Trust for Historic Preservation. On March 29, 1996, the Old Stone Church was added to the National Register of Historic Places.
