= Hebron Brick Company =

Brick manufacturing company

Coordinates: 46°52′32.06″N 96°49′0.14″W

- Formerly: Hebron Fire & Pressed Brick Company
- Industry: Industrials
- Founded: 1904; 122 years ago Hebron, North Dakota; U.S.
- Founders: Charles Weigel; Ferdinand Leutz
- Headquarters: West Fargo, North Dakota, U.S.
- Products: Bricks
- Website: www.hebronbrick.com

Hebron Brick is a brick manufacturing company located in West Fargo, North Dakota, and is the only brick company in North Dakota.

== History ==
Charles Weigel and Ferdinand Lutz established the Hebron Fire & Pressed Brick Company in 1904. Both were immigrants from Johannestal, Crimea, and Lutz had founded the town of Hebron the year prior.

Hebron Brick initially transported clay from the mine to the factory by horse and wagon before forming, drying, and firing it into usable bricks. The factory was expanded in 1913, and 12 continuous kilns were added outside. Production rose to 5 million bricks that year, before rising to 8.5 million in 1916.

The onset of United States involvement in World War One forced the factory to scale down, presaging a drop in the company's business activity. The general office was moved to Fargo, and the company underwent a major replacement of executives in 1926.

Starting in the late 1990s, the company invested $15 million in computers and robotic manufacturing systems, which helped drive a 60% increase in annual brick sales.

Hebron grew to operate in nine locations in North Dakota, South Dakota, and Minnesota as a producer of brick, stone, fireplaces, landscaping supplies, and concrete building products.

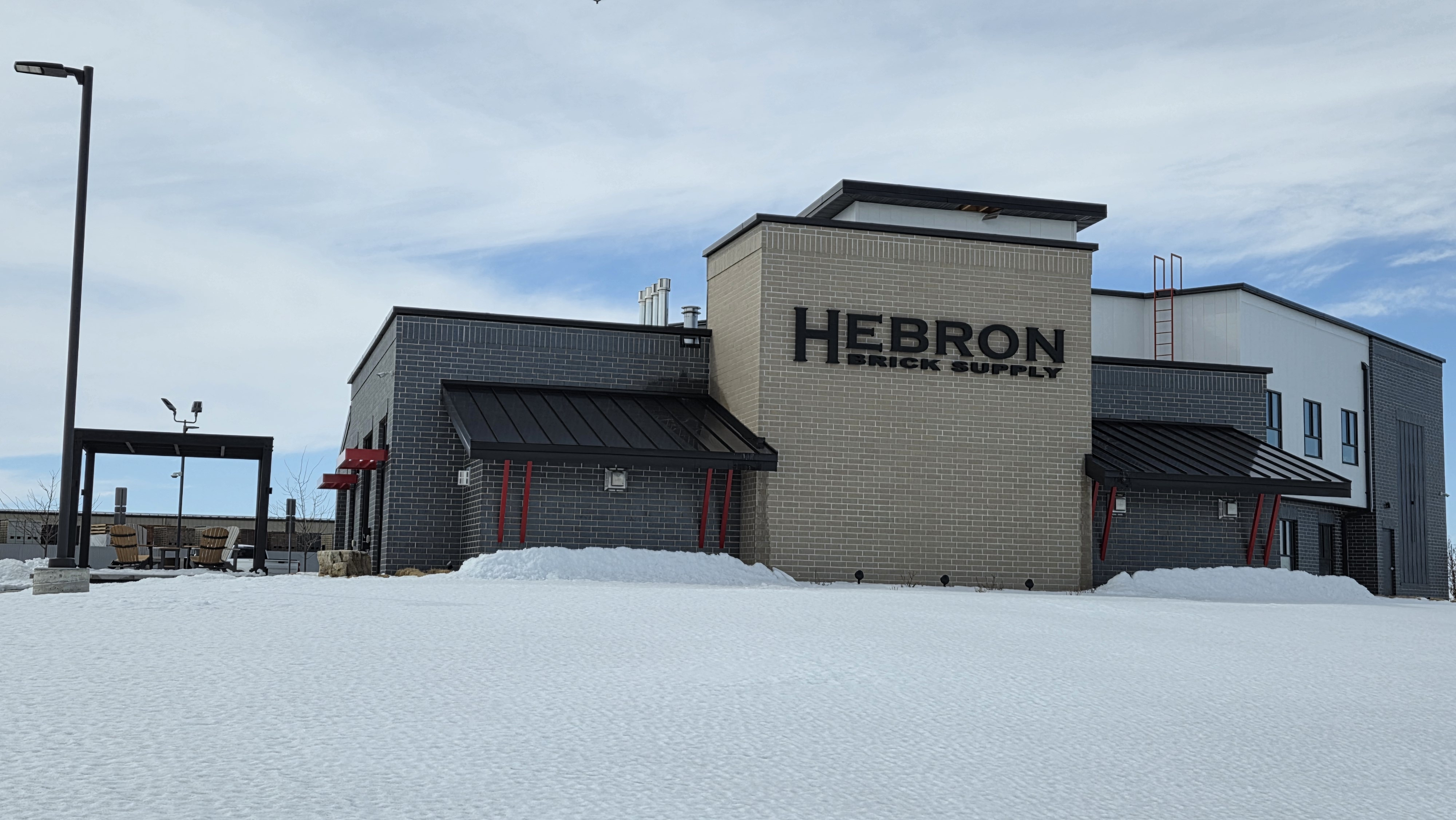
Hebron Headquarters in West Fargo

In 2017, the company converted to an employee stock ownership plan, giving company stock to employees based on years of service as a retirement benefit.
