= Buffalo, North Dakota =

- City
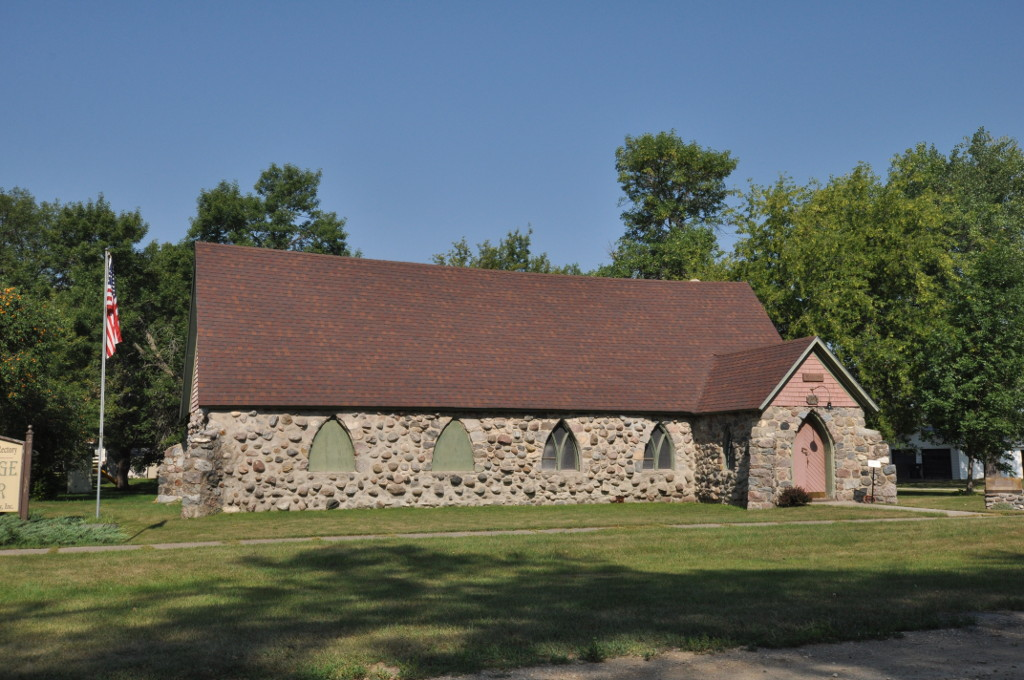
- Old Stone Church

- Location of Buffalo, North Dakota
- Coordinates: 46°55′09″N 97°33′02″W
- Country: United States
- State: North Dakota
- County: Cass
- Founded: 1878

Government
  - Mayor: Jim Jager

Area
  - Total: 0.481 sq mi (1.246 km^{2})
  - Land: 0.481 sq mi (1.246 km^{2})
  - Water: 0 sq mi (0.000 km^{2})
- Elevation: 1,201 ft (366 m)

Population (2020)
  - Total: 195
  - Estimate (2023): 188
  - Density: 405.3/sq mi (156.49/km^{2})
- Time zone: UTC–6 (Central (CST))
  - Summer (DST): UTC–5 (CDT)
- ZIP Code: 58011
- Area code: 701
- FIPS code: 38-10420
- GNIS feature ID: 1035946
- Website: buffalond.com

Buffalo is a city in Cass County, North Dakota, United States. The population was 195 at the 2020 census. Buffalo was founded in 1878.

== History ==
The first settlement at Buffalo was made in 1878. A post office called Buffalo has been in operation since 1883. The city took its name from Buffalo, New York.

== Geography ==
According to the United States Census Bureau, the city has a total area of 0.481 square miles (1.25 km^{2}), all land.

== Demographics ==
Historical population
Census	Pop.	Note	%±
1890	177		—
1900	213		20.3%
1910	241		13.1%
1920	268		11.2%
1930	242		−9.7%
1940	245		1.2%
1950	261		6.5%
1960	234		−10.3%
1970	241		3.0%
1980	226		−6.2%
1990	204		−9.7%
2000	209		2.5%
2010	188		−10.0%
2020	195		3.7%
2023 (est.)	188		−3.6%
U.S. Decennial Census; 2020 Census

=== 2010 census ===
As of the 2010 census, there were 188 people, 92 households, and 52 families living in the city. The population density was 817.4 inhabitants per square mile (315.6/km^{2}). There were 101 housing units at an average density of 439.1 per square mile (169.5/km^{2}). The racial makeup of the city was 92.6% White, 0.5% African American, 1.6% Native American, 0.5% Asian, and 4.8% from two or more races.

There were 92 households, of which 19.6% had children under the age of 18 living with them, 50.0% were married couples living together, 3.3% had a female householder with no husband present, 3.3% had a male householder with no wife present, and 43.5% were non-families. 39.1% of all households were made up of individuals, and 19.5% had someone living alone who was 65 years of age or older. The average household size was 2.04 and the average family size was 2.73.

The median age in the city was 44 years. 19.7% of residents were under the age of 18; 6.4% were between the ages of 18 and 24; 24.5% were from 25 to 44; 24% were from 45 to 64; and 25.5% were 65 years of age or older. The gender makeup of the city was 53.2% male and 46.8% female.

=== 2000 census ===
As of the 2000 census, there were 209 people, 96 households, and 57 families living in the city. The population density was 846.1 inhabitants per square mile (326.7/km^{2}). There were 105 housing units at an average density of 425.1 per square mile (164.1/km^{2}). The racial makeup of the city was 99.04% White and 0.96% Native American.

There were 96 households, out of which 22.9% had children under the age of 18 living with them, 55.2% were married couples living together, 1.0% had a female householder with no husband present, and 39.6% were non-families. 35.4% of all households were made up of individuals, and 26.0% had someone living alone who was 65 years of age or older. The average household size was 2.18 and the average family size was 2.83.

In the city, the population was spread out, with 22.0% under the age of 18, 2.9% from 18 to 24, 28.7% from 25 to 44, 20.6% from 45 to 64, and 25.8% who were 65 years of age or older. The median age was 43 years. For every 100 females, there were 99.0 males. For every 100 females age 18 and over, there were 91.8 males.

The median income for a household in the city was $31,250, and the median income for a family was $45,625. Males had a median income of $27,917 versus $18,333 for females. The per capita income for the city was $19,021. None of the families and 6.0% of the population were living below the poverty line, including no under eighteens and 8.7% of those over 64.

== Education ==
Maple Valley School District operates public schools serving Buffalo. An elementary campus is in the town. The former Buffalo High School is on the National Register of Historic Places.
