= National Register of Historic Places listings in Ramsey County, North Dakota =

Location of Ramsey County in North Dakota

This is a list of the National Register of Historic Places listings in Ramsey County, North Dakota.

This is intended to be a complete list of the properties and districts on the National Register of Historic Places in Ramsey County, North Dakota, United States. The locations of National Register properties and districts for which the latitude and longitude coordinates are included below, may be seen in a map.

There are 15 properties and districts listed on the National Register in the county.

Contents: Counties in North Dakota
Adams | Barnes | Benson | Billings | Bottineau | Bowman | Burke | Burleigh | Cass | Cavalier | Dickey | Divide | Dunn | Eddy | Emmons | Foster | Golden Valley | Grand Forks | Grant | Griggs | Hettinger | Kidder | LaMoure | Logan | McHenry | McIntosh | McKenzie | McLean | Mercer | Morton | Mountrail | Nelson | Oliver | Pembina | Pierce | Ramsey | Ransom | Renville | Richland | Rolette | Sargent | Sheridan | Sioux | Slope | Stark | Steele | Stutsman | Towner | Traill | Walsh | Ward | Wells | Williams

This National Park Service list is complete through NPS recent listings posted March 14, 2025.

== Current listings ==
	Name on the Register	Image	Date listed	Location	City or town	Description
1	Bangs-Wineman Block	Bangs-Wineman Block	November 14, 1985 (#85002797)	402-408 4th St. 48°07′14″N 98°51′35″W	Devils Lake	
2	Central High School	Central High School	December 29, 2003 (#03000871)	325 7th St. NE; 48°06′55″N 98°51′37″W	Devils Lake	
3	Devils Lake Carnegie Library	Devils Lake Carnegie Library	March 6, 2002 (#02000132)	623 4th Ave. 48°06′53″N 98°51′37″W	Devils Lake	
4	Devils Lake Commercial District	Devils Lake Commercial District	October 24, 1989 (#89001675)	Roughly bounded by 2nd Ave., 5th St., 5th Ave., 3rd St., and Railroad Ave. 48°06′44″N 98°51′36″W	Devils Lake	
5	Devils Lake Masonic Temple	Devils Lake Masonic Temple	September 1, 2001 (#01000923)	403 6th St. 48°06′50″N 98°48′33″W	Devils Lake	
6	Episcopal Church of the Advent-Guild Hall	Episcopal Church of the Advent-Guild Hall	June 20, 2002 (#02000669)	501 6th St., E. 48°06′51″N 98°51′29″W	Devils Lake	
7	Locke Block	Locke Block	July 24, 1986 (#86001915)	405 5th St. 48°06′45″N 98°51′34″W	Devils Lake	
8	Methodist Episcopal Church	Methodist Episcopal Church	July 16, 2008 (#08000680)	601 5th St., NE. 48°06′46″N 98°51′26″W	Devils Lake	
9	Newport Apartments	Newport Apartments	July 11, 1988 (#88000985)	601 7th St. 48°06′54″N 98°50′36″W	Devils Lake	
10	Ramsey County Sheriff's House	Ramsey County Sheriff's House	January 31, 1978 (#78003452)	420 6th St. 48°06′50″N 98°51′36″W	Devils Lake	
11	St. Mary's Academy	St. Mary's Academy	February 24, 1983 (#83001939)	E. 7th St. 48°06′55″N 98°50′52″W	Devils Lake	
12	St. Olaf Lutheran Church	St. Olaf Lutheran Church	March 23, 2015 (#15000106)	601 6th St., NE. 48°06′50″N 98°51′24″W	Devils Lake	
13	Sons of Jacob Cemetery	Sons of Jacob Cemetery	June 5, 2017 (#100001035)	88th Ave. NE, 0.25 miles (0.40 km) north of 67th St. NE; 48°23′21″N 98°45′28″W	Garske vicinity	Cemetery of Garske Colony, a Jewish farming community which existed from 1883 to about 1920.
14	U.S. Post Office and Courthouse	U.S. Post Office and Courthouse	June 22, 1978 (#78001993)	502 4th St. 48°06′42″N 98°51′29″W	Devils Lake	
15	Westminster Presbyterian Church	Westminster Presbyterian Church	July 16, 2008 (#08000679)	501 5th St., NE. 48°06′47″N 98°51′31″W	Devils Lake	

== See also ==
- List of National Historic Landmarks in North Dakota
- National Register of Historic Places listings in North Dakota
