= National Register of Historic Places listings in Stutsman County, North Dakota =

Location of Stutsman County in North Dakota

This is a list of the National Register of Historic Places listings in Stutsman County, North Dakota.

This is intended to be a complete list of the properties and districts on the National Register of Historic Places in Stutsman County, North Dakota, United States. The locations of National Register properties and districts for which the latitude and longitude coordinates are included below, may be seen in a map.

There are 10 properties and districts listed on the National Register in the county. Another two properties were once listed but have been removed.

Contents: Counties in North Dakota
Adams | Barnes | Benson | Billings | Bottineau | Bowman | Burke | Burleigh | Cass | Cavalier | Dickey | Divide | Dunn | Eddy | Emmons | Foster | Golden Valley | Grand Forks | Grant | Griggs | Hettinger | Kidder | LaMoure | Logan | McHenry | McIntosh | McKenzie | McLean | Mercer | Morton | Mountrail | Nelson | Oliver | Pembina | Pierce | Ramsey | Ransom | Renville | Richland | Rolette | Sargent | Sheridan | Sioux | Slope | Stark | Steele | Stutsman | Towner | Traill | Walsh | Ward | Wells | Williams

This National Park Service list is complete through NPS recent listings posted October 23, 2026.

== Current listings ==
	Name on the Register	Image	Date listed	Location	City or town	Description
1	Stephen William Brown Stone House	Stephen William Brown Stone House	February 4, 2004 (#03001545)	4829 75 R Ave., SE; 46°42′58″N 98°52′57″W	Montpelier	
2	Alfred E. Dickey Free Library	Alfred E. Dickey Free Library	July 3, 1980 (#80004545)	105 3rd St., SE. 46°54′24″N 98°42′28″W	Jamestown	
3	Elizabeth Apartments	Elizabeth Apartments	April 21, 1986 (#86000871)	402 2nd Ave. NW. 46°54′43″N 98°42′35″W	Jamestown	
4	Franklin School	Franklin School	May 9, 2002 (#02000474)	308 2nd St. SW. 46°54′28″N 98°42′42″W	Jamestown	
5	Grace Episcopal Church	Grace Episcopal Church	December 3, 1992 (#92001606)	Northwestern corner of the junction of 2nd Ave. NE. and 4th St. NE. 46°54′41″N 98°42′23″W	Jamestown	
6	Jamestown Historic District	Jamestown Historic District	September 8, 1989 (#88000987)	Roughly bounded by 1st St., 4th Ave., SE., 5th St., and 2nd Ave. 46°54′20″N 98°42′23″W	Jamestown	
7	Seiler Building	Seiler Building	January 16, 1986 (#86000080)	110 1st St., E. 46°54′30″N 98°42′25″W	Jamestown	
8	St. James Catholic Church	St. James Catholic Church	October 22, 1982 (#82001346)	622 1st Ave., S. 46°54′10″N 98°42′32″W	Jamestown	
9	Stutsman County Courthouse and Sheriff's Residence/Jail	Stutsman County Courthouse and Sheriff's Residence/Jail	September 8, 1976 (#76001356)	504 3rd Ave., SE. 46°54′13″N 98°42′20″W	Jamestown	
10	Voorhees Chapel	Voorhees Chapel	July 22, 1977 (#77001030)	Jamestown College campus 46°54′52″N 98°41′57″W	Jamestown	

=== Former listing ===
	Name on the Register	Image	Date listed	Date removed	Location	City or town	Description
1	Cecil Baker Round Barn		August 21, 1986 (#86002759)	March 28, 2011	ND 38; 47°15′13″N 98°52′47″W	Kensal	Demolished 2010
2	Midland Continental Overpass		February 27, 1997 (#97000194)	July 18, 2024	Over an abandoned railroad grade, former U.S. Route 10, approximately 7 miles east of Jamestown; 46°56′09″N 98°32′55″W	Jamestown	Replaced in 2005

== See also ==
- List of National Historic Landmarks in North Dakota
- National Register of Historic Places listings in North Dakota
