= Kensal =

Kensal refers to:

- Kensal Green, also known as Kensal Rise, part of London, United Kingdom
- Kensal Town, part of London, United Kingdom
- Kensal, North Dakota, United States
