= John Marshall (architect) =

American architect

- Born: April 12, 1864; Edinburgh, Scotland
- Died: October 5, 1949 (aged 85); Devils Lake, North Dakota
- Occupation: Architect

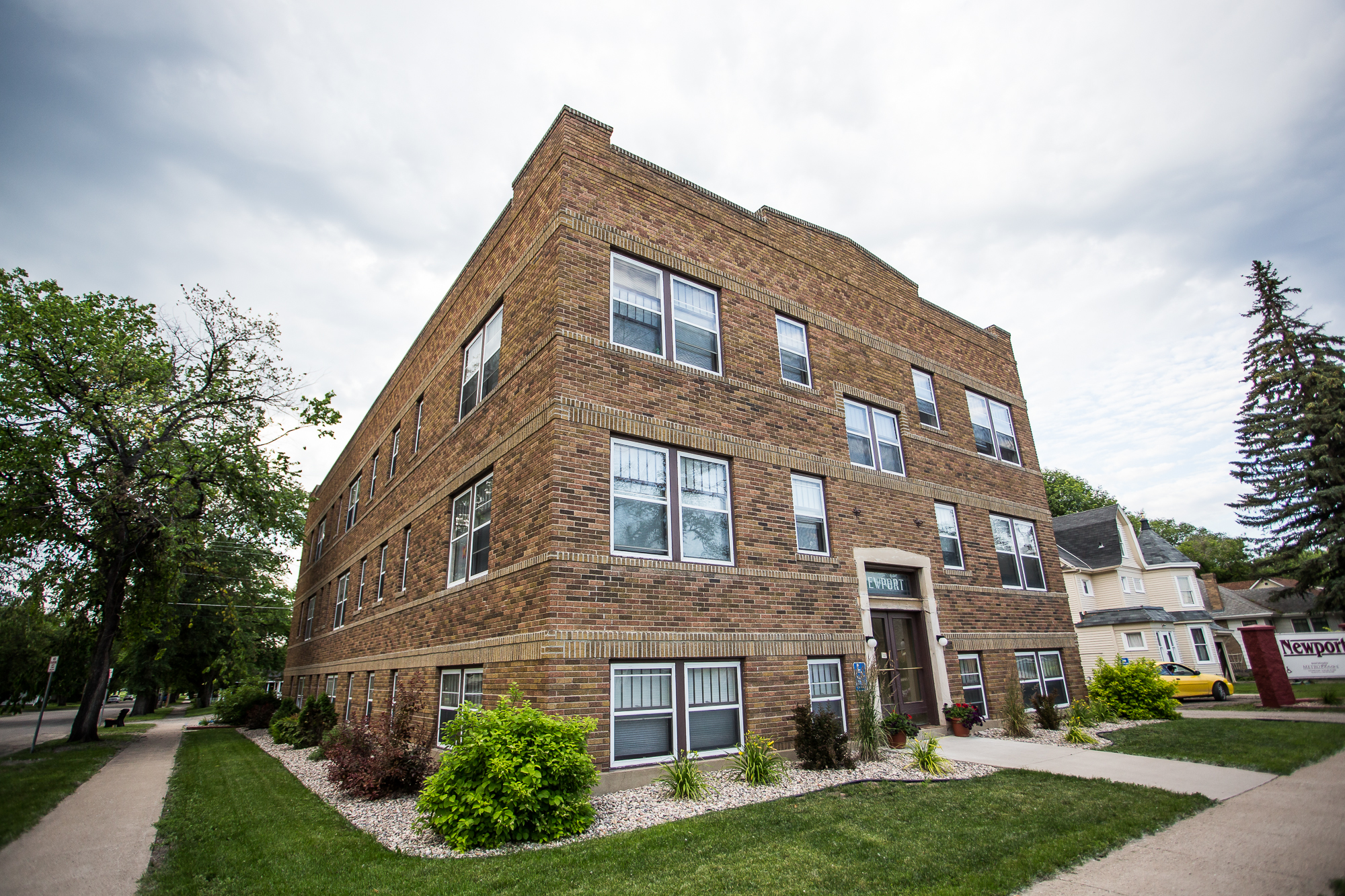
The Newport Apartments in Devils Lake, designed by Marshall and completed in 1929.

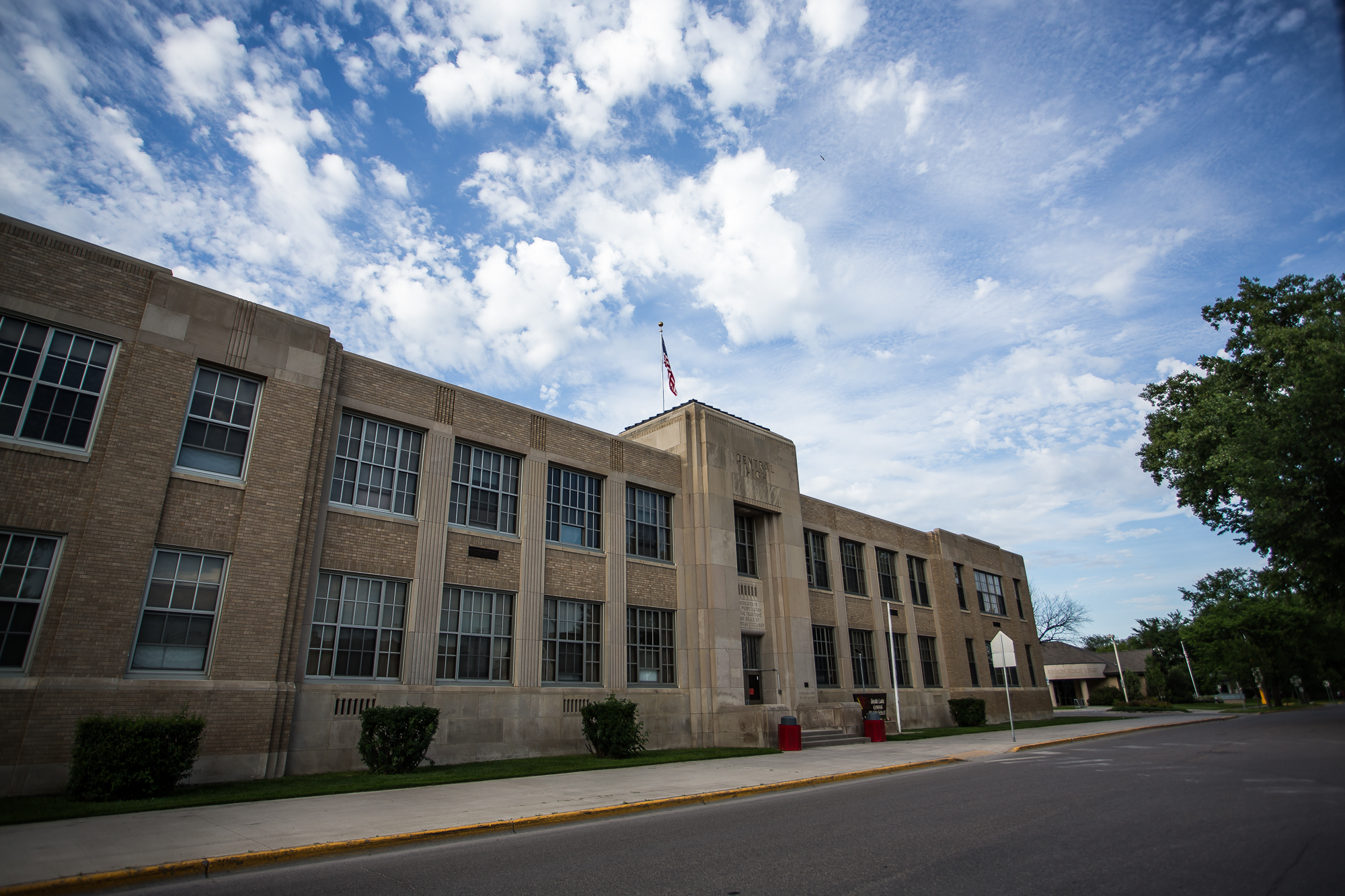
The former Central High School in Devils Lake, designed by Marshall and Nairne W. Fisher and completed in 1937.

John Marshall (1864–1949) was a Scottish-born American architect in practice in Devils Lake, North Dakota, from 1905 until 1946.

== Life and career ==
John Marshall was born April 12, 1864, in Edinburgh. Circa 1889, at the age of 25, Marshall immigrated to the United States, initially settling in Chicago. He worked as a contractor and architect in Illinois, Indiana and Nebraska. In 1895 he came to North Dakota, establishing a homestead in Ramsey County near what would become Starkweather. By 1904 he had given up farming, and was practicing as an architect in Starkweather. In 1905 he moved to Cando, and shortly thereafter to Devils Lake. When he moved to Devils Lake he formed a brief partnership with a Mr. Sarles, but spent the majority of his forty-year career as an independent practitioner. He retired from practice in 1946.

Marshall was a member of the North Dakota Association of Architects and served as its president.

== Personal life ==
Marshall was married in 1892 to Amanda E. Kaley in Chicago. She died in 1942, and Marshall chose to retire shortly thereafter. He died October 5, 1949, in Devils Lake at the age of 85. At the time of his death, he was noted as having been the oldest living architect in the state.

== Legacy ==
At least three of his works are listed on the United States National Register of Historic Places.

== Architectural works ==
- Starkweather Community Church (former), Main St, Starkweather, North Dakota (1919)
- Newport Apartments, 601 7th St NE, Devils Lake, North Dakota (1929, NRHP 1988)
- Marshall Building, (Note: A contributing resource to the Devils Lake Commercial District, NRHP-listed in 1989.) 205 5th St NE, Devils Lake, North Dakota (1930)
- Memorial Building, (Note: Designed in association with Nairne W. Fisher of St. Cloud, Minnesota.) 508 4th Ave NE, Devils Lake, North Dakota (1934)
- Central High School (former), 325 7th St NE, Devils Lake, North Dakota (1936–37, NRHP 2003)
- Roxy Theatre, 714 3rd St, Langdon, North Dakota (1936, NRHP 1998)
