= Ashley Jewish Homesteaders Cemetery =

Historic site in McIntosh County, North Dakota

- U.S. National Register of Historic Places
- Location within North Dakota Location within the United States
- Location: 48th Ave. SE. Ashley, North Dakota
- Coordinates: 46.078°N 99.379°W
- Area: 1.7 acres (0.69 ha)
- Website: https://www.ashleyjewishcemetery.org
- NRHP reference No.: 15000807
- Added to NRHP: November 17, 2015

The Ashley Jewish Homesteaders Cemetery is an early 20th century burial site near Ashley, North Dakota.

== History ==
The Russian and Romanian Jews who farmed the area beginning in 1905 arrived as refugees fleeing pogroms and persecution. They had never farmed before, due to restrictions against Jews owning land in their native countries. Despite this lack of experience and the many rocks and boulders that peppered their claims, with the assistance of their German and Russian neighbors, and hard work and persistence, the great majority of them were successful enough to buy their land outright prior to the five-year waiting period contained within the Homestead Act of 1862, or to own their land at the five year mark.

Over the course of the next 20 years, these Jewish farmers moved off their farms to carve out their livelihoods. Though many remained as shopkeepers in the smaller towns in the Dakotas, a significant number chose to eventually move closer to larger Jewish educational and social centers.

Established in 1913, the cemetery remains as the only physical evidence of the largest Jewish agricultural settlement in North Dakota, South Dakota, or Montana. It was added to the National Register of Historic Places listings in 2015, and re-dedicated with explanatory plaques in 2017. It is the only remaining Jewish homesteader cemetery in the Dakotas that has been continually cared for by the descendants of those buried, and the Ashley residents hired by the descendants to maintain the grounds.

== Background ==
Russian and Romanian Jewish immigrants who fled to America to escape pogroms in their home country, began staking homestead claims in McIntosh County, North Dakota in 1905, arriving two decades into the county's homesteading immigration flux. What they found was a stark landscape of rocky soil and severe weather conditions. They lived either in sod houses, made of earth and grass, or dug out holes in the ground and covered them with manure for protection against the elements. Nevertheless, they persevered, seeing the fruits of their labors in agriculture, livestock and dairy farming.

These settlers also maintained their Jewish religion and culture despite living in this remote area. The first Jewish congregation was formed by lay leader Kiva Bender, buried in the cemetery, who also formed the first Jewish farming cooperative in the area. Two rabbis, Rabbi Julius Hess and Rabbi Ostrowsky, later served the Ashley/Wishek and other nearby North Dakota rural areas.

== Cemetery ==
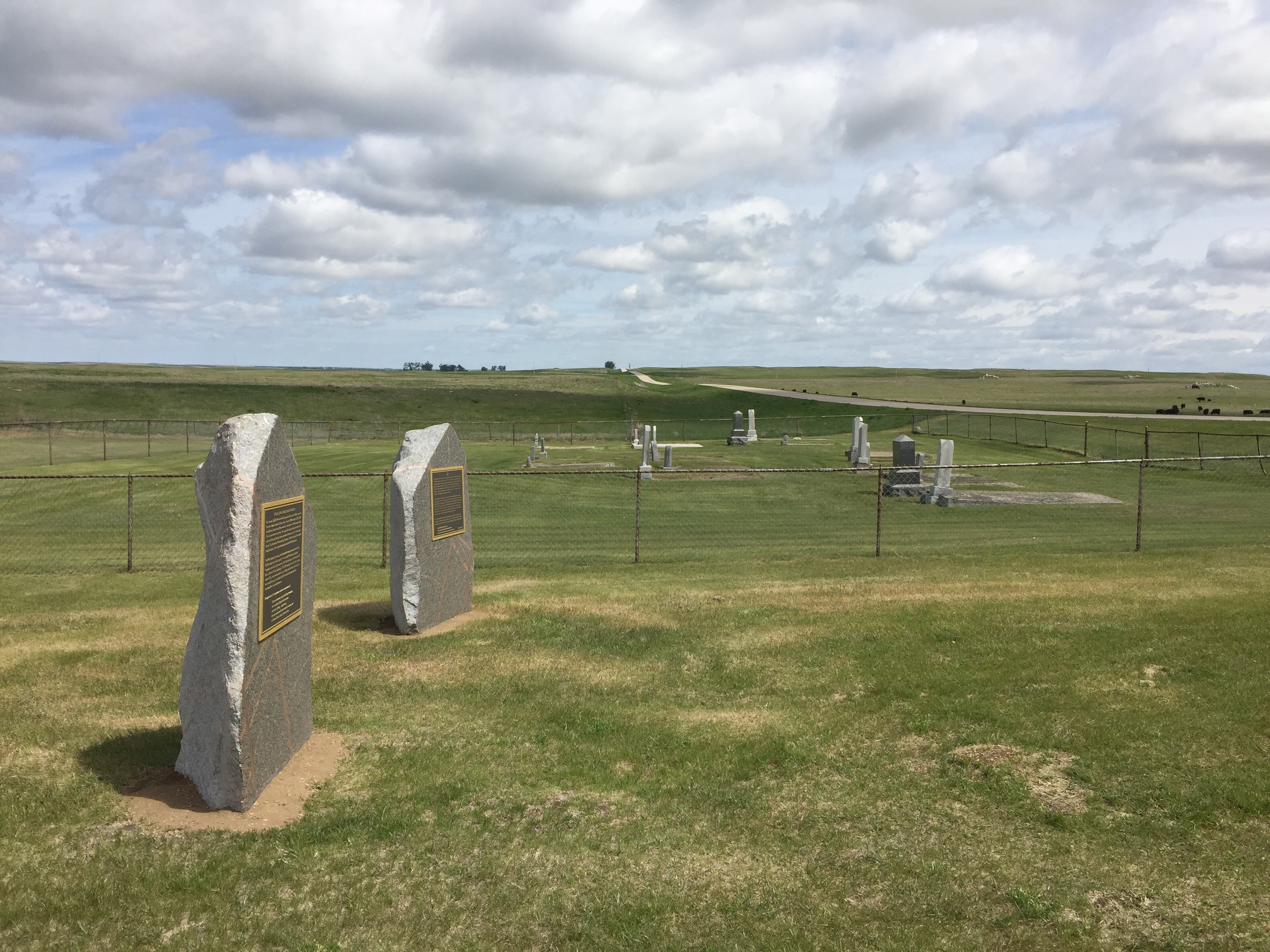
National Register of Historic Places

The Ashley Jewish Homesteaders Cemetery is located approximately three miles north of the city limits of Ashley, North Dakota. The first burial marked with a monument was that of Lipman Bloom in 1913. The last burial was of Maxine Sally Becker in 1932, about the time the community itself disbanded. The cemetery is the only remaining physical evidence that the community existed.

The site contains 22 monuments, with epitaphs inscribed in the Hebrew language and symbols meaningful in the Jewish religion, as well as unmarked graves. Infants were buried in a separate area in accordance with Jewish tradition of the time. According to the National Park Service, Ashley was the largest Jewish agricultural settlement ever in North Dakota, with the largest number of marked graves of Jewish homesteader families in either North or South Dakota.

== NRHP and other recognition ==
The cemetery was added to the NRHP in North Dakota on November 17, 2015. North Dakota governor Doug Burgum declared May 21, 2017 "North Dakota Jewish Homesteaders Day", to honor the re-dedication ceremony held by descendants of those buried in the cemetery.

== See also ==
- Sons of Jacob Cemetery, another Jewish homesteaders' cemetery in Ramsey County, North Dakota, NRHP-listed in 2017
