= Old Main (Dakota College at Bottineau) =

- Old Main, North Dakota School of Forestry
- U.S. National Register of Historic Places
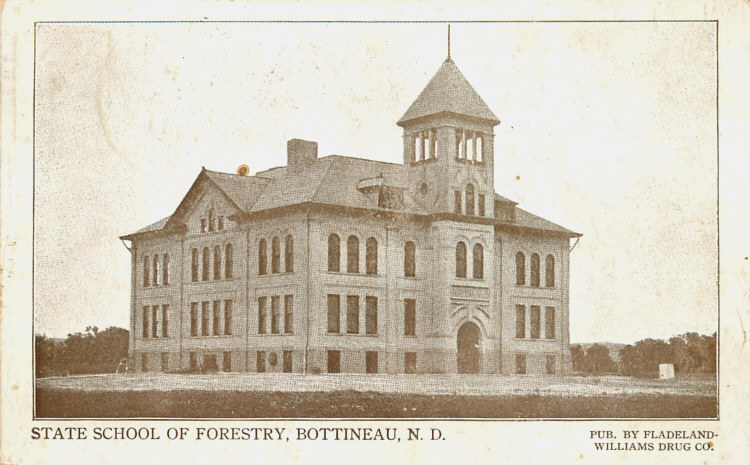
- State School of Forestry at Bottineau, c. 1911

- Location within North Dakota Location within the United States
- Location: Alexander St. (N of terminus with 1st St. E), Bottineau, North Dakota
- Coordinates: 48°50′3″N 100°26′25″W
- Area: less than one acre
- Built: 1907
- Architect: Shannon, Joseph A.; White, Edmund
- Architectural style: Romanesque
- NRHP reference No.: 06000532
- Added to NRHP: September 01, 2006

Old Main, constructed in 1907–1908, is a historic building at Dakota College at Bottineau, a two-year college in Bottineau, North Dakota. The building is listed in the National Register of Historic Places.

== History ==
In 1889, the North Dakota legislature wanted to establish a forestry school. Bottineau was chosen as the location in 1894. The state legislative assembly raised $25,000 in 1907, then commissioned architect Joseph Shannon for the building, completed in 1908. The school was constructed in the Romanesque Revival style. The school's campus expanded over the years, but the original building retained its nickname of Old Main.

== Closure and renovation ==
Old Main was closed in 2006 due to costs related to deferred maintenance and the need to bring the building in line with Americans with Disabilities Act standards. Fundraising to begin renovations began in 2019 and work began in 2023. The building was finalized and reopened in October 2024, containing classrooms for the school's nursing and healthcare education programs.
