= Alfred E. Dickey Free Library =

- U.S. National Register of Historic Places
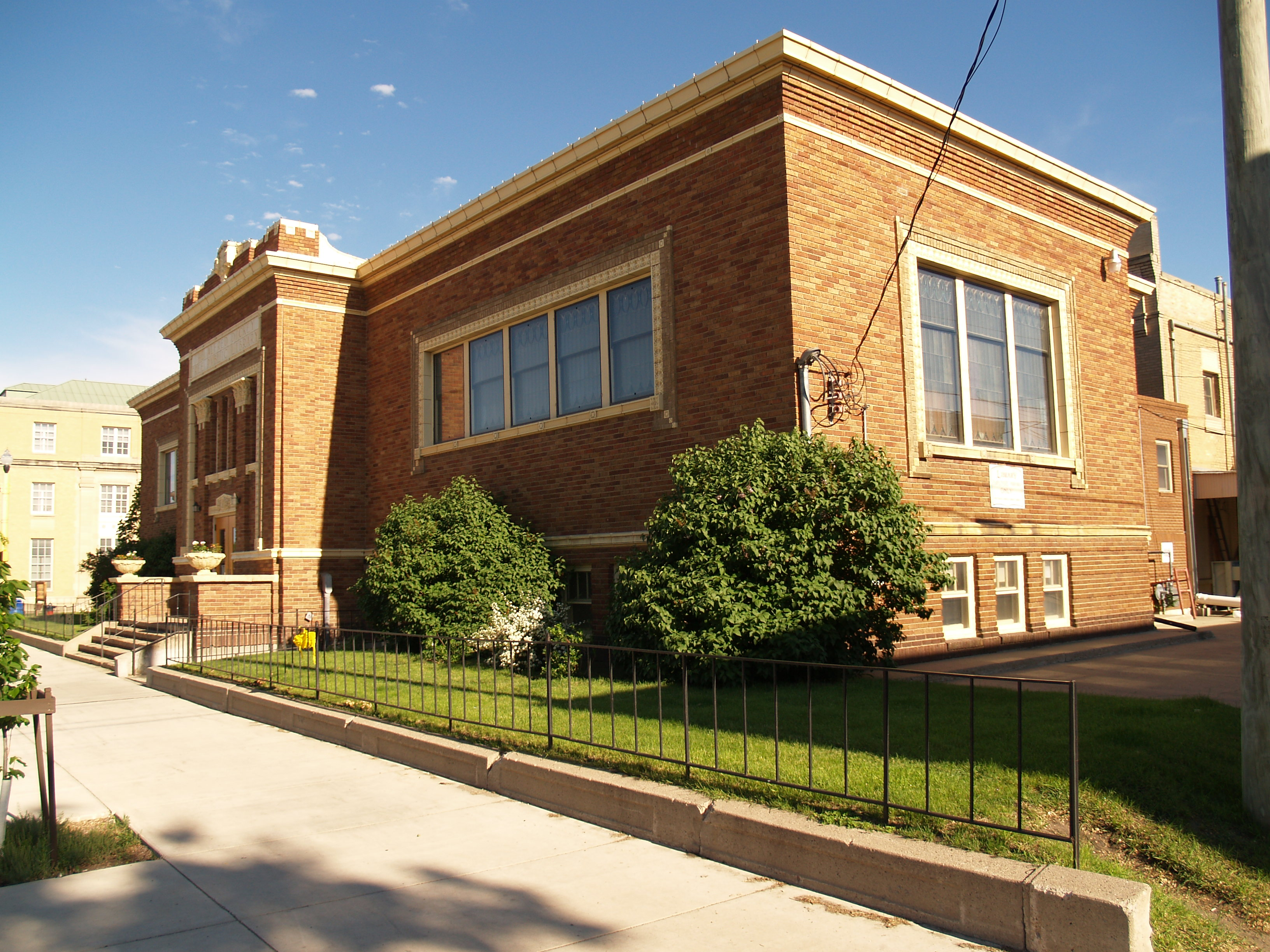
- Library in 2008

- Location within North Dakota Location within the United States
- Location: 105 3rd St., SE, Jamestown, North Dakota
- Coordinates: 46°54′24″N 98°42′28″W
- Area: less than one acre
- Built: 1917
- Architect: Shannon, J.A.; Scherer, Henry J.
- Architectural style: Prairie School
- NRHP reference No.: 80004545
- Added to NRHP: July 3, 1980

The Alfred E. Dickey Free Library in Jamestown, North Dakota was built in 1917. It was listed on the National Register of Historic Places in 1980.

According to its NRHP nomination, it is "a rare and fine example" of Prairie School architecture in North Dakota.

It seems to have been designed by Joseph A. Shannon and Henry J. Scherer. According to its NRHP nomination, however, it was designed by architectural partners "J. H. Shannon" and Henry J. Scherer. And according to a different NRHP nomination, from 1989, for the Devils Lake Commercial District, the Dickey Free Library was designed by "John A. Shannon", late in his career. These appear to be misstatements of the name of local architect Joseph A. Shannon.
