= St. Olaf Lutheran Church (Devils Lake, North Dakota) =

Historic church in North Dakota, United States

- U.S. National Register of Historic Places
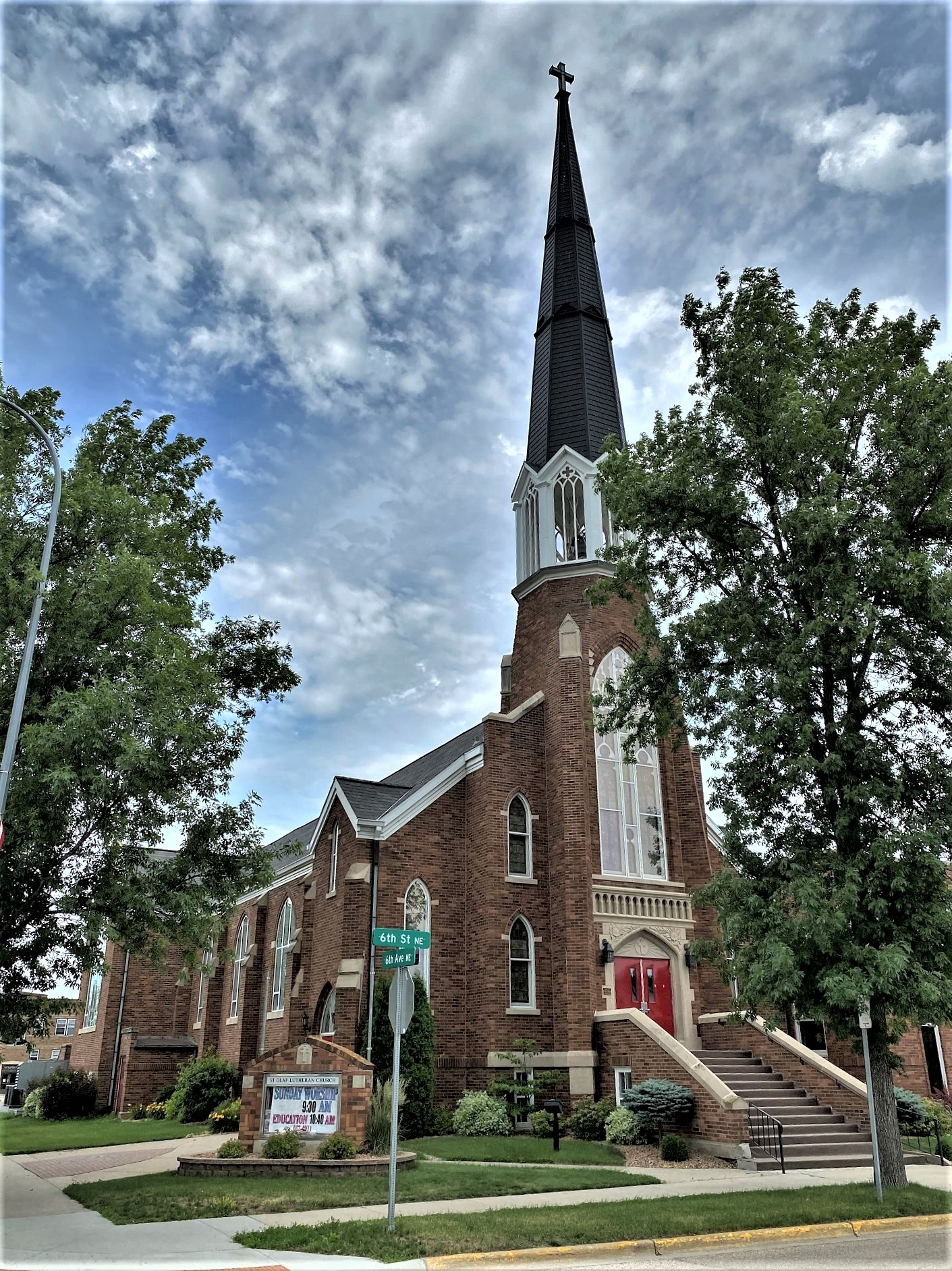

- Location within North Dakota Location within the United States
- Location: 601 6th St., NE. Devils Lake, North Dakota
- Coordinates: 48°06′50″N 98°51′24″W
- Built: 1930
- Architectural style: Late Gothic Revival
- NRHP reference No.: 15000106
- Added to NRHP: March 23, 2015

The St. Olaf Lutheran Church in Devils Lake, North Dakota was listed on the National Register of Historic Places in March 2015.

It was designed by Devils Lake architect Joseph A. Shannon in Late Gothic Style and was built in 1930.

The St. Olaf Congregation was organized in 1885, and another congregation merged in 1887. A wood-frame church was built by 1888 at Sixth St. and Sixth Ave. in Devils Lake. In 1929 the lot diagonally across was purchased for a new, larger church, and despite the onset of the Great Depression the present church was built during 1930. An education unit was added in the 1950s and there was another addition in 1987.
