= Roxy Theatre (Langdon, North Dakota) =

Historic place in North Dakota, United States

- U.S. National Register of Historic Places
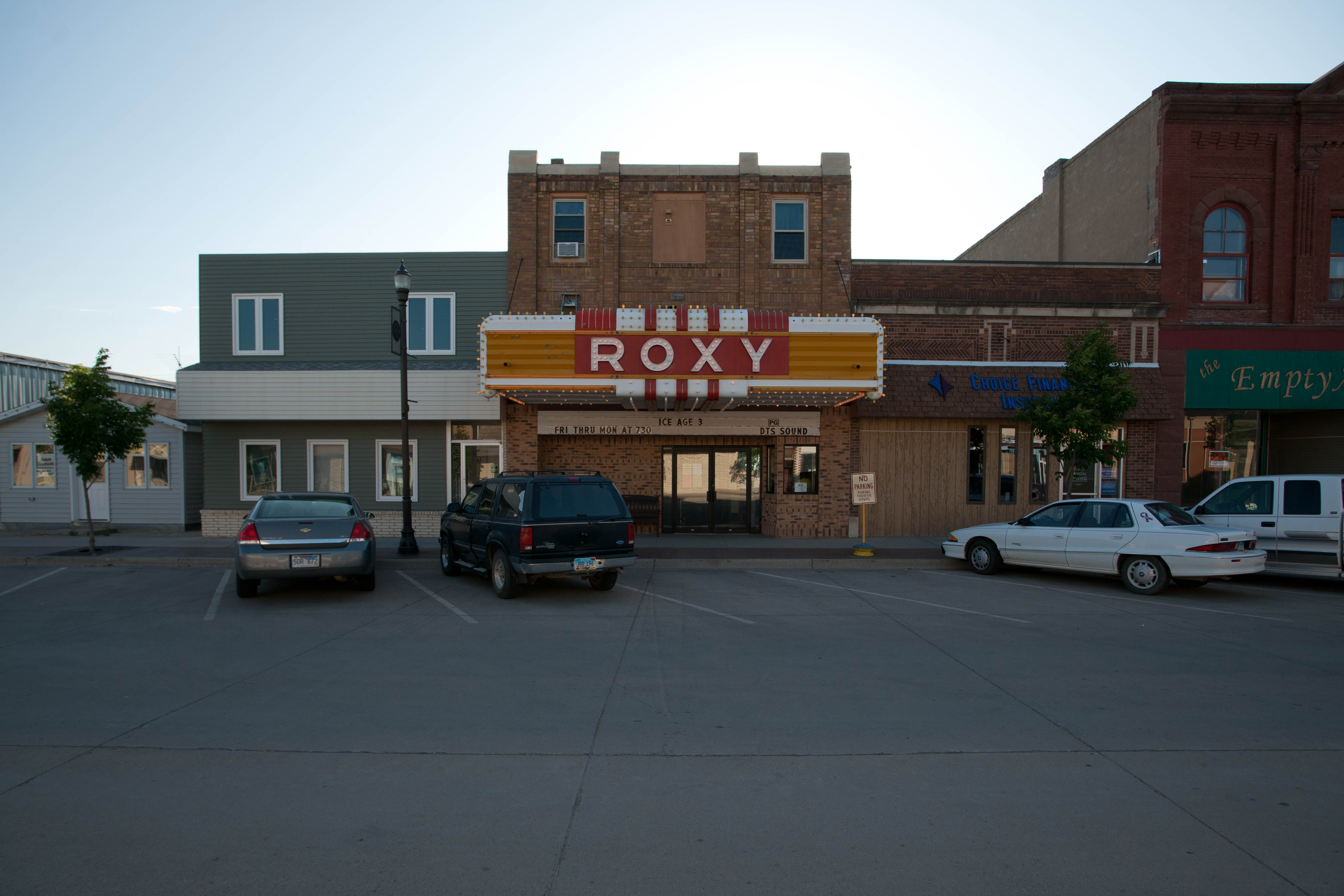

- Location within North Dakota Location within the United States
- Nearest city: Langdon, North Dakota
- Coordinates: 48°45′35″N 98°22′6″W
- Area: less than one acre
- Built: 1936
- Built by: Welworth Enterprises
- Architect: John Marshall
- Architectural style: Early Commercial
- NRHP reference No.: 98001341
- Added to NRHP: November 18, 1998

The Roxy Theatre in Langdon, North Dakota, United States, in the center of the Langdon business district, was built in 1936 in Early Commercial architecture. It was listed on the National Register of Historic Places in 1998.

It's a tall, narrow building. It was designed by Devils Lake architect John Marshall (1864–1949), from Scotland, a former president of the North Dakota State Architects Association.

The theatre "was open continuously from 1936 till January 1995."
