= Devils Lake Carnegie Library =

- U.S. National Register of Historic Places
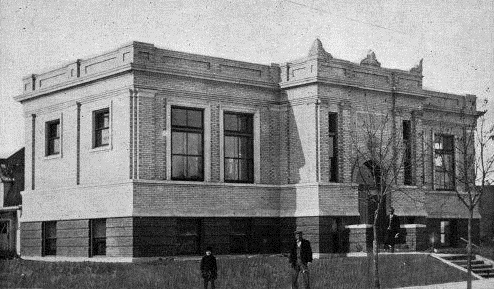
- Devils Lake Carnegie Library, c. 1910s

- Location within North Dakota Location within the United States
- Location: 623 4th Ave., Devils Lake, North Dakota
- Coordinates: 48°6′53″N 98°51′37″W
- Area: less than one acre
- Built: 1909
- Built by: Gram, Vlademar
- Architect: Joseph A. Shannon
- Architectural style: Classical Revival
- MPS: Philanthropically Established Libraries in North Dakota MPS
- NRHP reference No.: 02000132
- Added to NRHP: March 6, 2002

The Devils Lake Carnegie Library is a Carnegie library located in Devils Lake, North Dakota. It was built in 1909 and designed by architect Joseph A. Shannon. It was listed on the National Register of Historic Places in 2002.

It was opened on January 21, 1910, with no ceremony, but the local newspaper afterward declared the opening to be a "'great event'", marking a "'new era in the intellectual advancement of Devils Lake'".

Danish-born builder Valdemar or Vlademar Gram built the library, the Locke Block (also NRHP-listed), and numerous other Devils Lake buildings.

After 93 years, on November 26, 2003, the library was moved from its historic location- due to deterioration and much-needed space and renovations- to a new facility down the street, located at 423 7th St N. They added more meeting rooms, handicapped-accessible entrances (one of the goals of the move), and a one-floor model for improvement to the staffing model.

This brought about questions about what to do with the historic landmark, which became lofts in 2015, bought by Paula Hasse Anderson for $1,000, wishing to keep the building from being razed by the city. Gary Martinson, city assessor and building official for the City of Devils Lake, said at the time that Anderson has accomplished the city's goal of preserving the historic building while finding a new use for it.

From a 2015 Grand Forks Herald article: "Each of the 925-square-foot, one-bedroom lofts is fully furnished and features an open-concept kitchen and living room with original fireplace, one and a half baths and a 12-by-12-foot combined laundry and dressing room, complete with a full-size washer and dryer. The lofts' amenities include unlimited WiFi, a 50-inch smart TV with cable, high-end designer bedding, a pillow-top queen bed with storage, spa-quality towels and private parking. In the dressing room closet, guests will even find a full-length, fluffy bathrobe. The kitchen features custom cabinetry, a built-in microwave oven, a dishwasher, a garbage disposal, a Keurig coffee-maker, a wine center and a large island with bar-stool seating. Granite counters top the kitchen island, wine center and bathroom vanity."

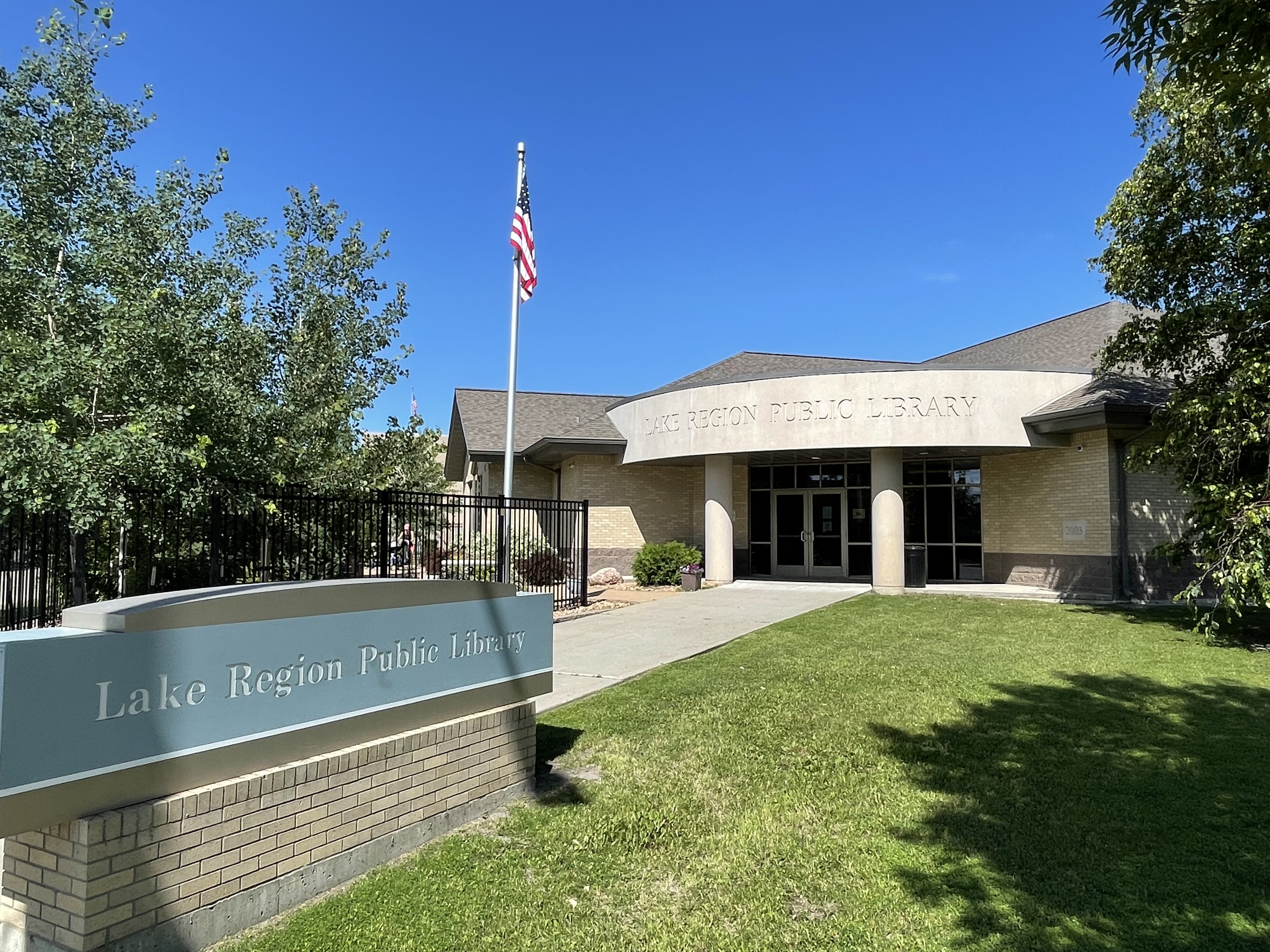
Lake Region Public Library, Devils Lake, North Dakota

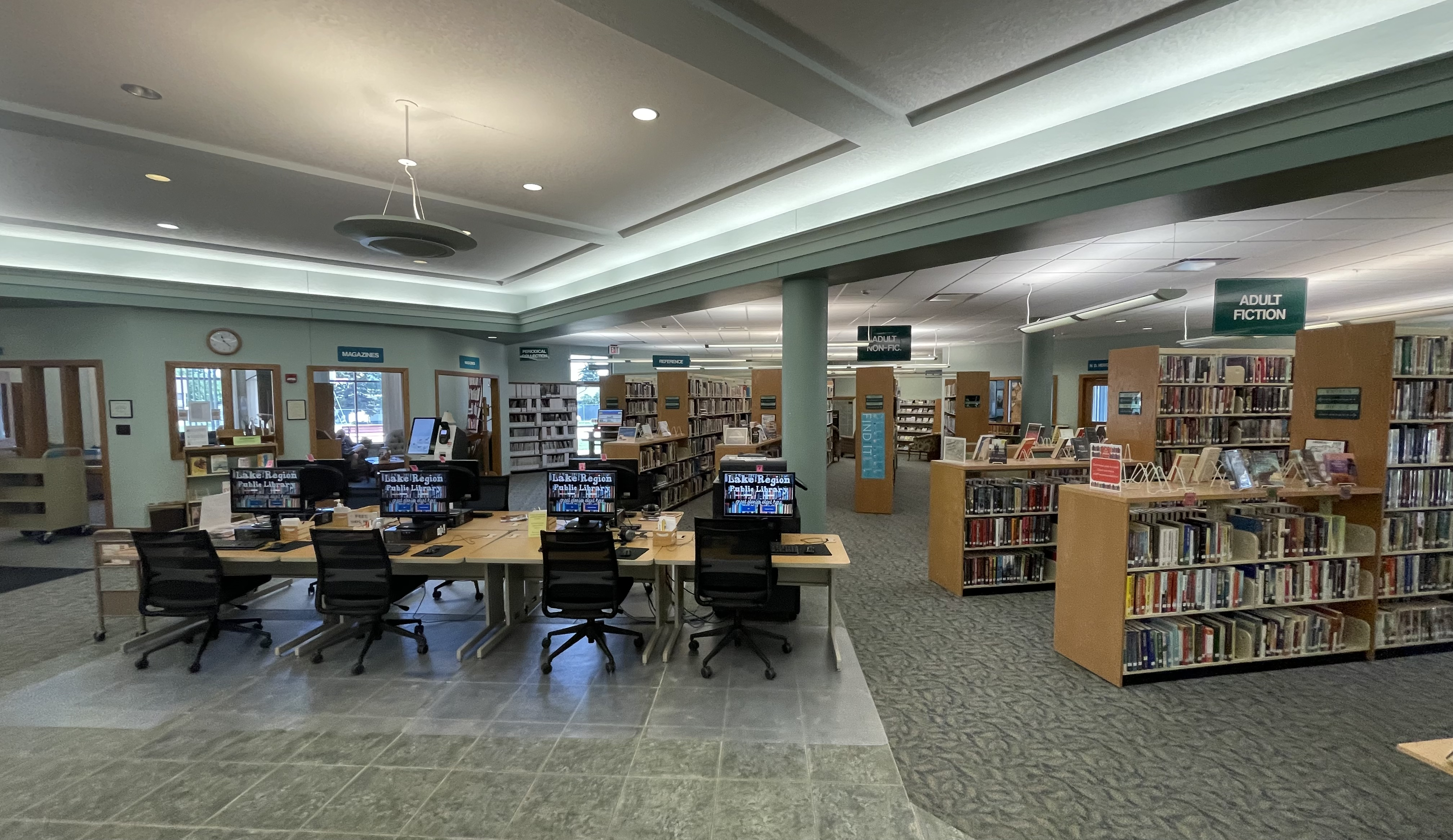
Lake Region Public Library interior, Devils Lake, North Dakota

Carnegie Library changed its name to Lake Region Public Library with the move and opened on Monday, December 22, 2003. This followed a fundraiser that began in spring 1992. The new library is 9,033 square feet, all on one-level and is fully compliant with Americans With Disabilities Act (ADA) requirements. The library cost $1.1 million, with 70% raised through private donations, bequests and grants; a portion of the City sales tax proceeds provided the balance of funds. The library's collection houses over 43,800 items, and has eight Internet-accessible computers and WiFi available to the public. Jim Chattin served as Library Director for the Lake Region Public Library for over four decades.
