= Garske, North Dakota =

Unincorporated community in North Dakota, US

Coordinates: 48°21′28″N 98°52′38″W

Garske is an unincorporated community in Ramsey County, in the U.S. state of North Dakota.

== History ==
A Jewish homesteading community named the Garske Colony was settled in 1883 and lasted until about 1925. The Sons of Jacob Cemetery, its cemetery, was listed on the National Register of Historic Places in June, 2017.

The cemetery is located about 8 miles (13 km) from the present-day unincorporated community of Garske as located on Google maps (which matches the coordinates of the GNIS listing for Garske).

The population was 32 in 1940.
