= Bangs-Wineman Block =

- U.S. National Register of Historic Places
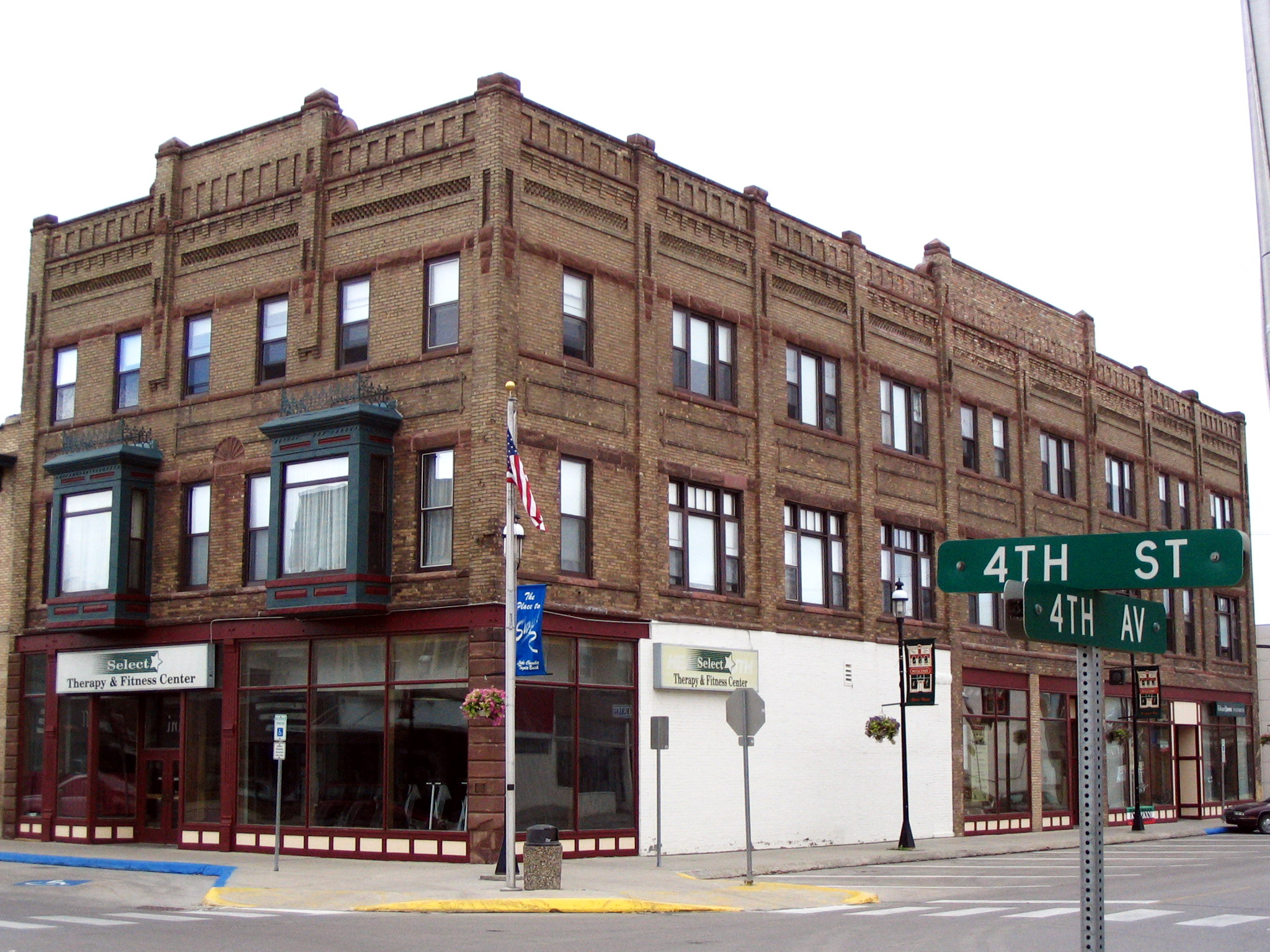

- Location within North Dakota Location within the United States
- Location: 402-408 Fourth St., Devils Lake, North Dakota
- Coordinates: 48°7′14″N 98°51′35″W
- Area: less than one acre
- Built: 1895
- Built by: Fosburgh, W.C.
- Architectural style: Classical Revival
- NRHP reference No.: 85002797
- Added to NRHP: November 14, 1985

The Bangs-Wineman Block on Fourth St., Devils Lake, North Dakota, USA, was built in 1895. It has also been known as Glicksons Department Store. It was listed on the National Register of Historic Places in 1985.

Its 1985 NRHP nomination does not identify an architect for the building, but it is included in the 1989 NRHP-listed Devils Lake Commercial District, where "John A. Shannon", which appears to be a misstatement of the local architect Joseph A. Shannon, is named.
