= Joseph A. Shannon =

American architect

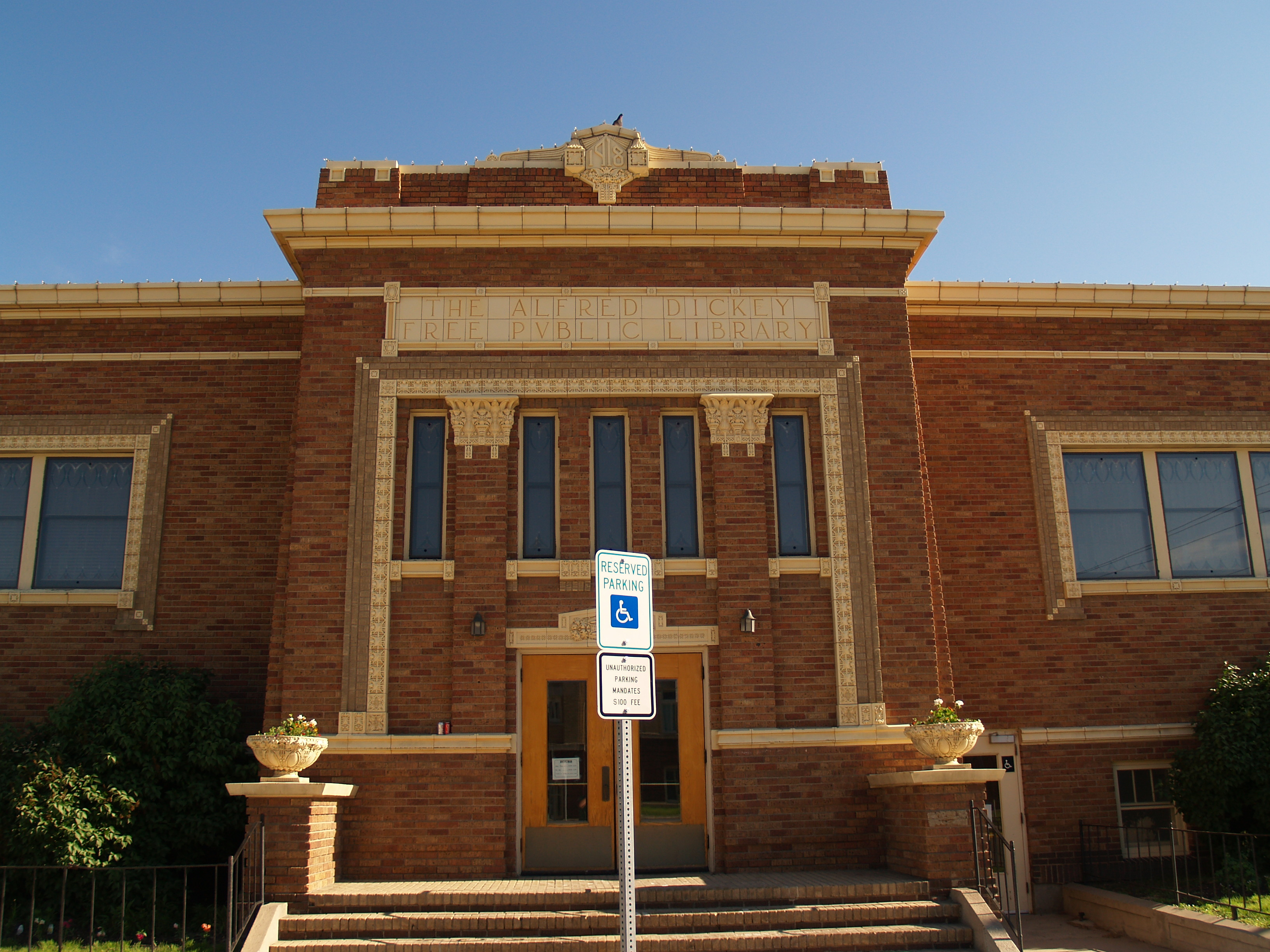
Alfred E. Dickey Free Library, Jamestown, North Dakota

Joseph A. Shannon (1859-1934), known in at least one source as John A. Shannon, was an architect in Devils Lake, North Dakota.

He has been termed "the city's first true architect". He apparently had no formal degree in architecture, yet applied for certification and became one of North Dakota's first licensed architects in 1917. He designed 17 buildings in Devils Lake, of which 15 survived in 2001, of which the Devils Lake Masonic Temple is the "best example".

Shannon was born March 21, 1859, and grew up in Edina, Missouri. In Minnesota he worked as a carpenter, then established a homestead near Bristol, South Dakota, and later worked as a carpenter at Fort Sisseton in South Dakota. He later served as president of the North Dakota State Board of Architecture. He lived in Devils Lake until his death on January 25, 1934.

A number of his works are listed on the U.S. National Register of Historic Places.

Works include (with attribution as given in NRHP documents):

- Devils Lake Carnegie Library, 623 4th Ave. Devils Lake, ND (Shannon, Joseph A.), NRHP-listed
- Devils Lake Masonic Temple, 403 Sixth St. Devils Lake, ND (Shannon, Joseph A.), NRHP-listed
- Old Main, North Dakota School of Forestry, Alexander St. (N of terminus with 2nd St.) Bottineau, ND (Shannon, Joseph A.), NRHP-listed
- Methodist Episcopal Church, 601 5th St. NE. Devils Lake, ND (Shannon, Joseph A.), NRHP-listed
- Westminster Presbyterian Church, 501 5th St. NE. Devils Lake, ND (Shannon, Joseph A.), NRHP-listed
- Alfred E. Dickey Free Library, 105 3rd St., SE Jamestown, ND (Shannon, J. H.), NRHP-listed
- Two works in Devils Lake Commercial District: the Fire Hall and the Bangs-Wineman Block, Devils Lake, ND (Shannon, John A.), NRHP-listed

According to the NRHP nomination, from 1989, for the Devils Lake Commercial District, the Dickey Free Library was designed by "John A. Shannon", late in his career. That appears to be a misstatement of local architect Joseph A. Shannon's name.
