= Sons of Jacob Cemetery =

Cemetery in Ramsey County, North Dakota, US

- U.S. National Register of Historic Places
- Location within North Dakota Location within the United States
- Location: 88th Ave. NE, 0.25 miles (0.40 km) north of 67th St. NE, vicinity of Garske in Ramsey County, North Dakota
- Coordinates: 48°23′21″N 98°45′28″W
- NRHP reference No.: 100001035
- Added to NRHP: June 5, 2017

The Sons of Jacob Cemetery in rural Ramsey County, North Dakota was listed on the National Register of Historic Places in 2017. It was the cemetery of the Garske Colony, a farming community of Jewish immigrant homesteaders which was founded in 1883 and operated until about 1925.

Jewish homesteaders came from Russia, where they were not allowed to own land, and tried to survive in harsh conditions in North Dakota. Many built sod houses or tarpaper shacks to live in while attempting to prove their land claims for 160 acres (0.65 km^{2}) under the Homestead Act.

There once were nine rural Jewish cemeteries in North Dakota. The cemetery of the largest Jewish farming community in the state, the Ashley Jewish Homesteaders Cemetery, was listed on the National Register in May 2015. The Garske one, the Ashley one, and one in Regan are the only three that are "not entirely overgrown" by 2017.
