= Locke Block =

- U.S. National Register of Historic Places
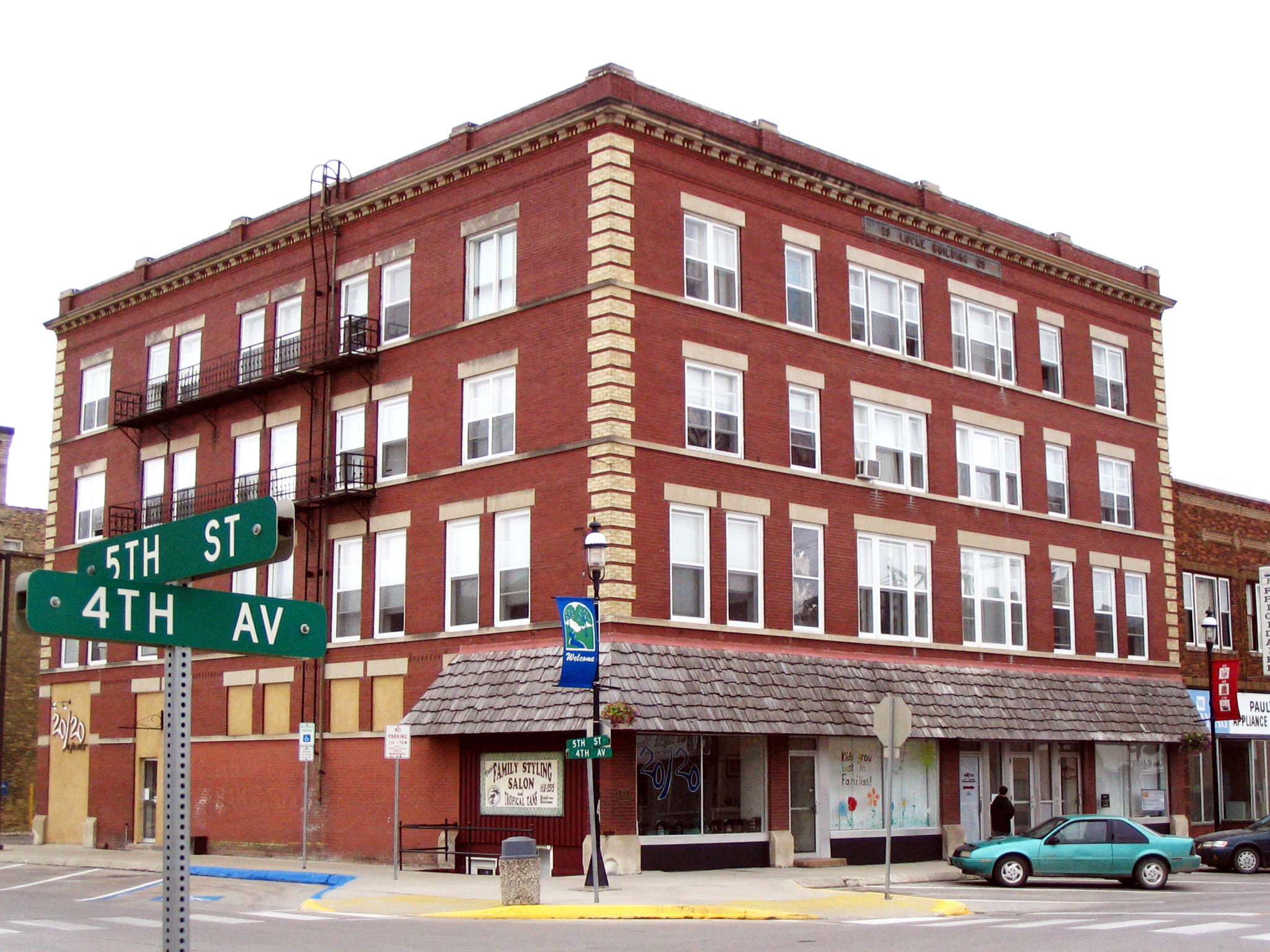

- Location within North Dakota Location within the United States
- Location: 405 Fifth St., Devils Lake, North Dakota
- Coordinates: 48°6′45″N 98°51′34″W
- Area: less than one acre
- Built: 1909
- Built by: Gram, Valdemar
- Architectural style: Chicago
- NRHP reference No.: 86001915
- Added to NRHP: July 24, 1986

The Locke Block on Fifth Street in Devils Lake, North Dakota, was built in 1909. It was listed on the National Register of Historic Places (NRHP) in 1986.

Built as a residential building, its four-story height "would 'make the building a sky scraper in comparison to the other buildings in the city,'" per a contemporary local newspaper article. The roof drain system was innovative.

Its NRHP nomination in 1986 identified it as "the best remaining example of 'Chicago School' commercial architecture in Devils Lake."

Danish-born builder Valdemar or Vlademar Gram's name originally appeared in the date block for the building, but only Locke's name appears now. Gram was prominent in Devils Lake and built the Devils Lake Carnegie Library (also NRHP-listed), the St. Joseph Catholic Church, and part of the Great Northern Hotel.
