= Elizabeth Apartments =

Historic residential building in North Dakota, United States

- U.S. National Register of Historic Places
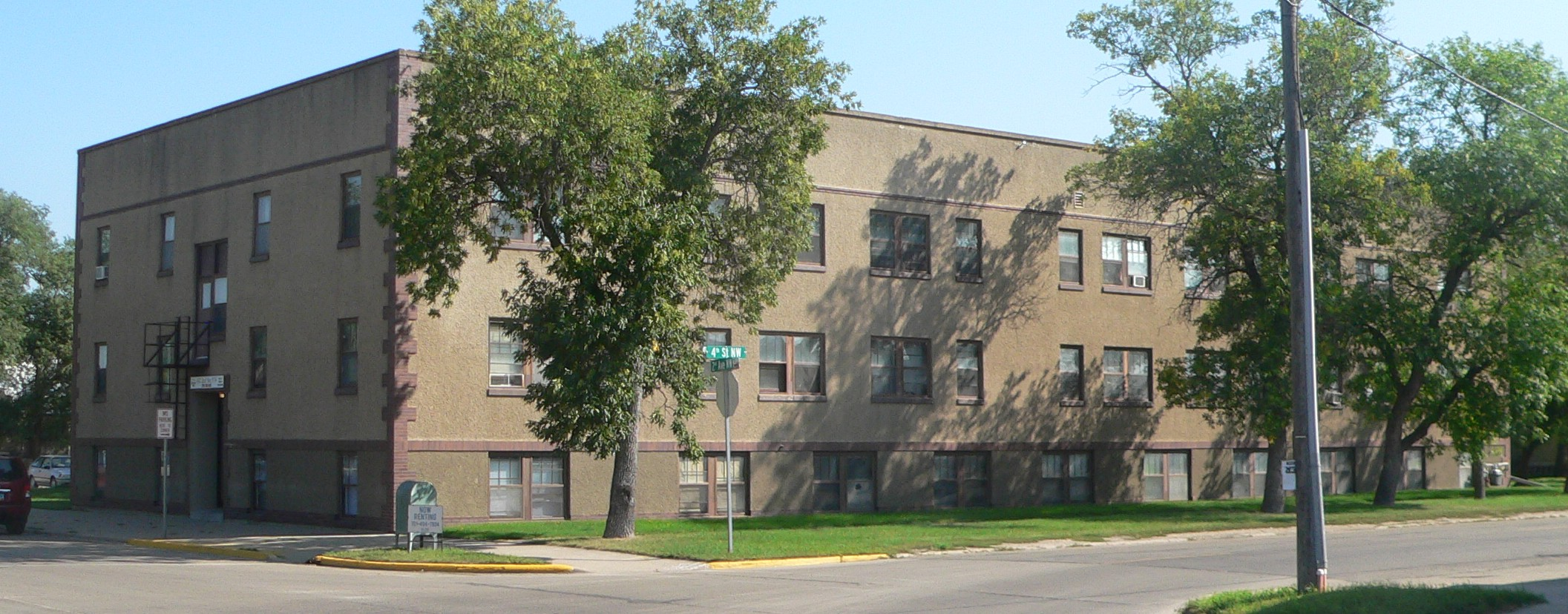

- Location within North Dakota Location within the United States
- Location: 402 Second Ave. NW, Jamestown, North Dakota
- Coordinates: 46.911843°N 98.709707°W
- Built: 1921
- Built by: Moline, Elof A.
- Architectural style: Classical Revival
- NRHP reference No.: 86000871
- Added to NRHP: April 21, 1986

The Elizabeth Apartments on Second Ave. NW in Jamestown, North Dakota were built in 1921. The building was listed on the National Register of Historic Places in 1986.

According to its NRHP nomination, the building was deemed significant "for its association with the business lives of the John H. Canhams and Ormsby McHargs, leading developers and owners of Jamestown's utility companies from 1888 to 1924" and also "architecturally and historically as the best example in the city of affordable multi-family housing constructed in response to the population boom in Jamestown between 1910 and 1920 when housing was scarce, Post-World War I labor costs were high, and there was a severe shortage of building materials."

The design was simple and extensively used stucco, which "directly related to the need for quick construction and the lack of good building materials, including brick, in the early 1920s."
