= Devils Lake Masonic Temple =

- U.S. National Register of Historic Places
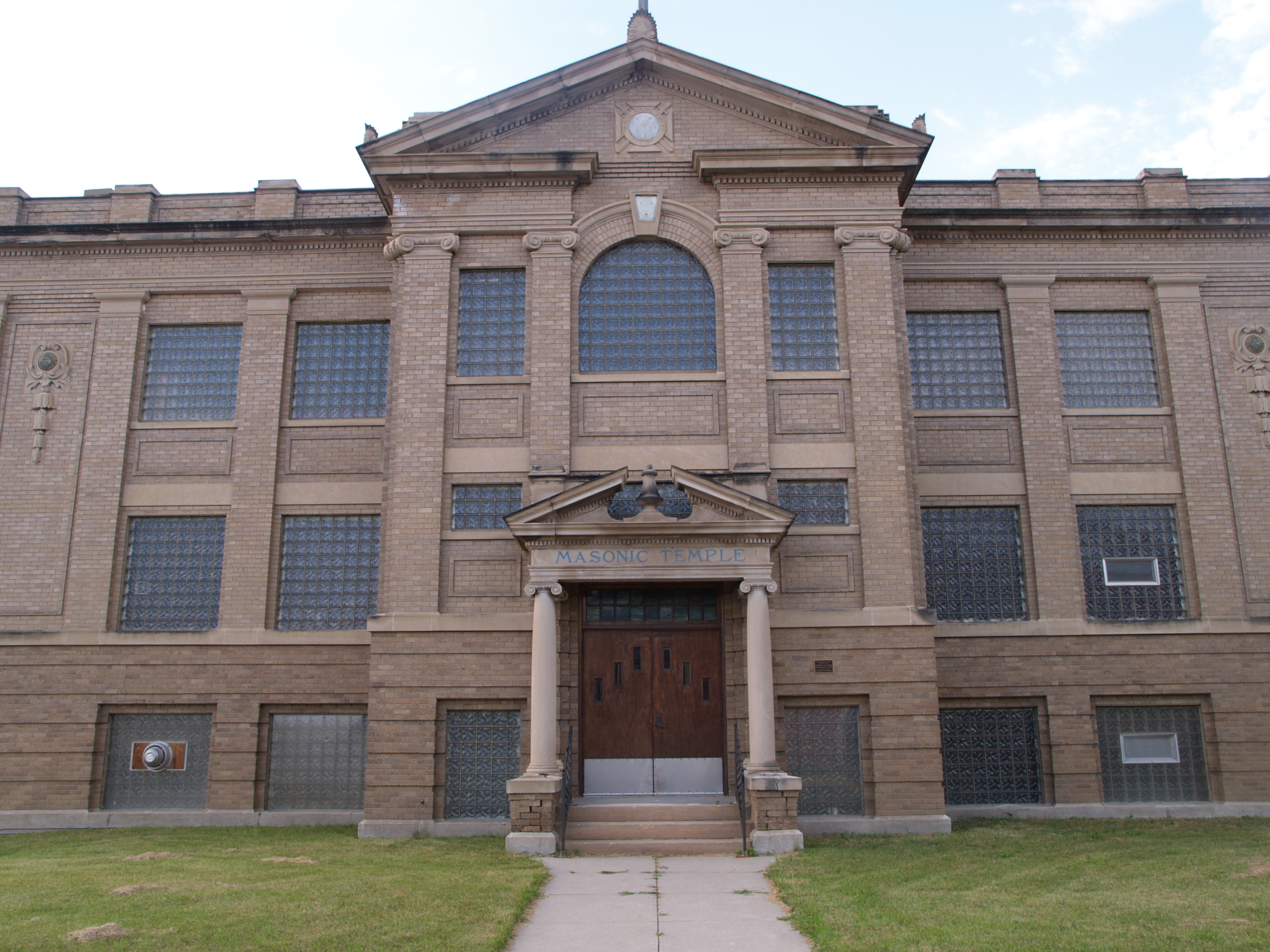
- Devils Lake Masonic Temple in 2005

- Location within North Dakota Location within the United States
- Location: 403 Sixth St., Devils Lake, North Dakota
- Coordinates: 48°6′50″N 98°48′33″W
- Area: less than one acre
- Built: 1916
- Architect: Shannon, Joseph A.; Fieldseth & Johnson
- Architectural style: Neoclassical
- NRHP reference No.: 01000923
- Added to NRHP: September 01, 2001

The Devils Lake Masonic Temple in Devils Lake, North Dakota is a Masonic building from 1916. It was listed on the National Register of Historic Places (NRHP) in 2001.

Its NRHP nomination asserts that the building "possesses an outstanding collection of stylistic elements which typify the Classical Revival style. It stands as a detached building with each facade reflecting the principles of the Classical Revival and its concerns for proportion and symmetry as interpreted by its designer, local architect, Joseph A. Shannon (1859 -1934)."
