= Cecil Baker Round Barn =

- Formerly listed on the U.S. National Register of Historic Places
- Location within North Dakota Location within the United States
- Nearest city: Kensal, North Dakota
- Coordinates: 47°15′13″N 98°52′47″W
- Area: less than one acre
- Built: 1921
- Built by: Gordon-Vantine Co., Cecil Baker
- Architectural style: Round barn
- MPS: North Dakota Round Barns TR
- NRHP reference No.: 86002759

Significant dates
- Added to NRHP: October 7, 1986
- Removed from NRHP: March 28, 2011

The Cecil Baker Round Barn near Kensal, North Dakota, United States, was a round barn built in 1921. It was listed on the National Register of Historic Places in 1986. It was demolished in 2010 and delisted from the National Register the following year.

It was apparently a kit barn purchased from the Gordon–Van Tine company, "a pre-cut home and farm building supplier" in Davenport, Iowa.

== See also ==
- Gordon–Van Tine Company Historic District
