= Methodist Episcopal Church (Devils Lake, North Dakota) =

Historic church in North Dakota, United States

- U.S. National Register of Historic Places
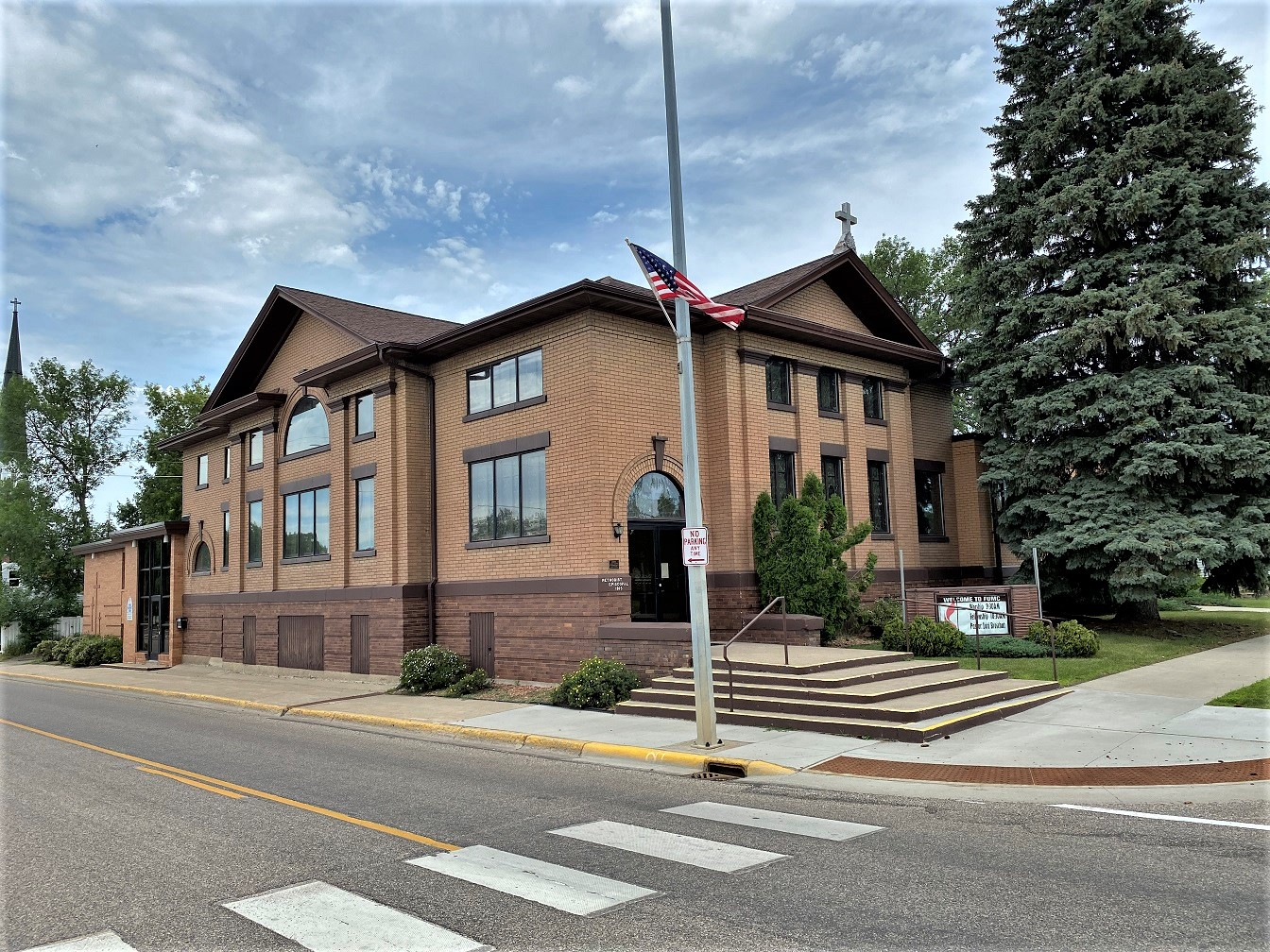

- Location within North Dakota Location within the United States
- Location: 601 5th St. NE. Devils Lake, North Dakota
- Coordinates: 48°6′56″N 98°51′24″W
- Area: 0.3 acres (0.12 ha)
- Built: 1915
- Architect: Joseph A. Shannon, et al.
- Architectural style: Classical Revival, Romanesque
- NRHP reference No.: 08000680
- Added to NRHP: July 16, 2008

The Methodist Episcopal Church on 5th St., NE in Devils Lake, North Dakota was built in 1915. It was designed by local architect Joseph A. Shannon. It was listed on the National Register of Historic Places in 2008.

It is now the First United Methodist Church.
