= Central Middle School (Devils Lake, North Dakota) =

- Central High School
- U.S. National Register of Historic Places
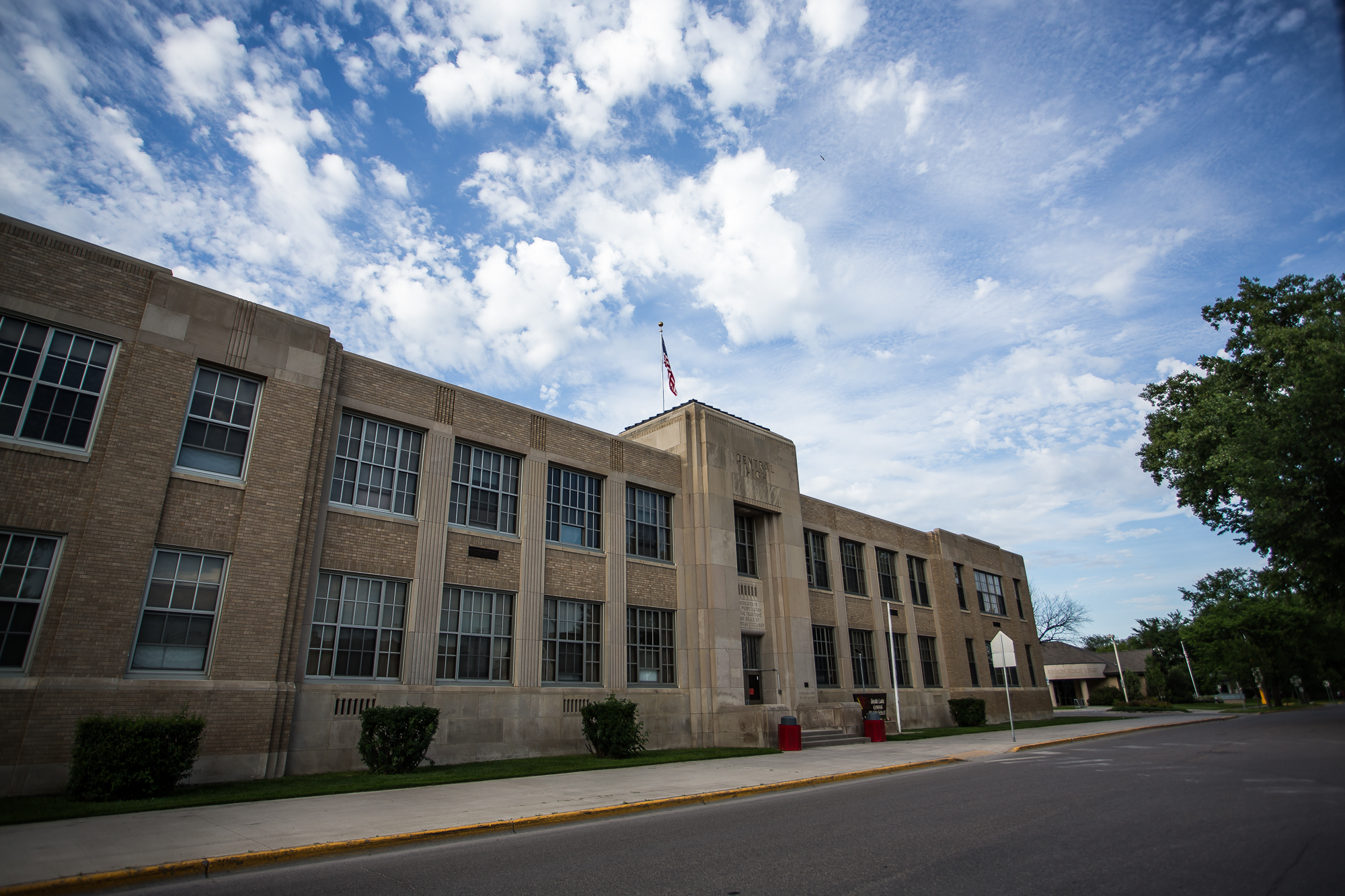
- Central Middle School in July 2014

- Location within North Dakota Location within the United States
- Location: 325 Seventh St. NE, Devils Lake, North Dakota
- Coordinates: 48.1150°N 98.8604°W
- Area: 2.4 acres (0.97 ha)
- Built: 1936–37
- Architect: Nairne W. Fisher; John Marshall
- Architectural style: Art Deco
- NRHP reference No.: 03000871
- Added to NRHP: December 29, 2003

The Central Middle School on Seventh St. in Devils Lake, North Dakota was built in 1936. It was designed by architects John Marshall of Devils Lake and Nairne W. Fisher of St. Cloud, Minnesota in Art Deco style. The school was listed on the National Register of Historic Places (NRHP) in 2003 as the Central High School.

According to its NRHP nomination, the school "is a locally prominent landmark that derives its significance from two principal areas: Education and Architecture...for its role in the development of the Devils Lake School System [and]...for being an excellent and rare example of a high architectural style, Art Deco, in Devils Lake."

It includes a 1964-installed central clock system that rings bells and controls clocks in all classrooms, replacing usage of a pendulum-regulated, original, 1936 clock, which remains in place in a basement below the main office.
