= Westminster Presbyterian Church (Devils Lake, North Dakota) =

Historic church in North Dakota, United States

- U.S. National Register of Historic Places
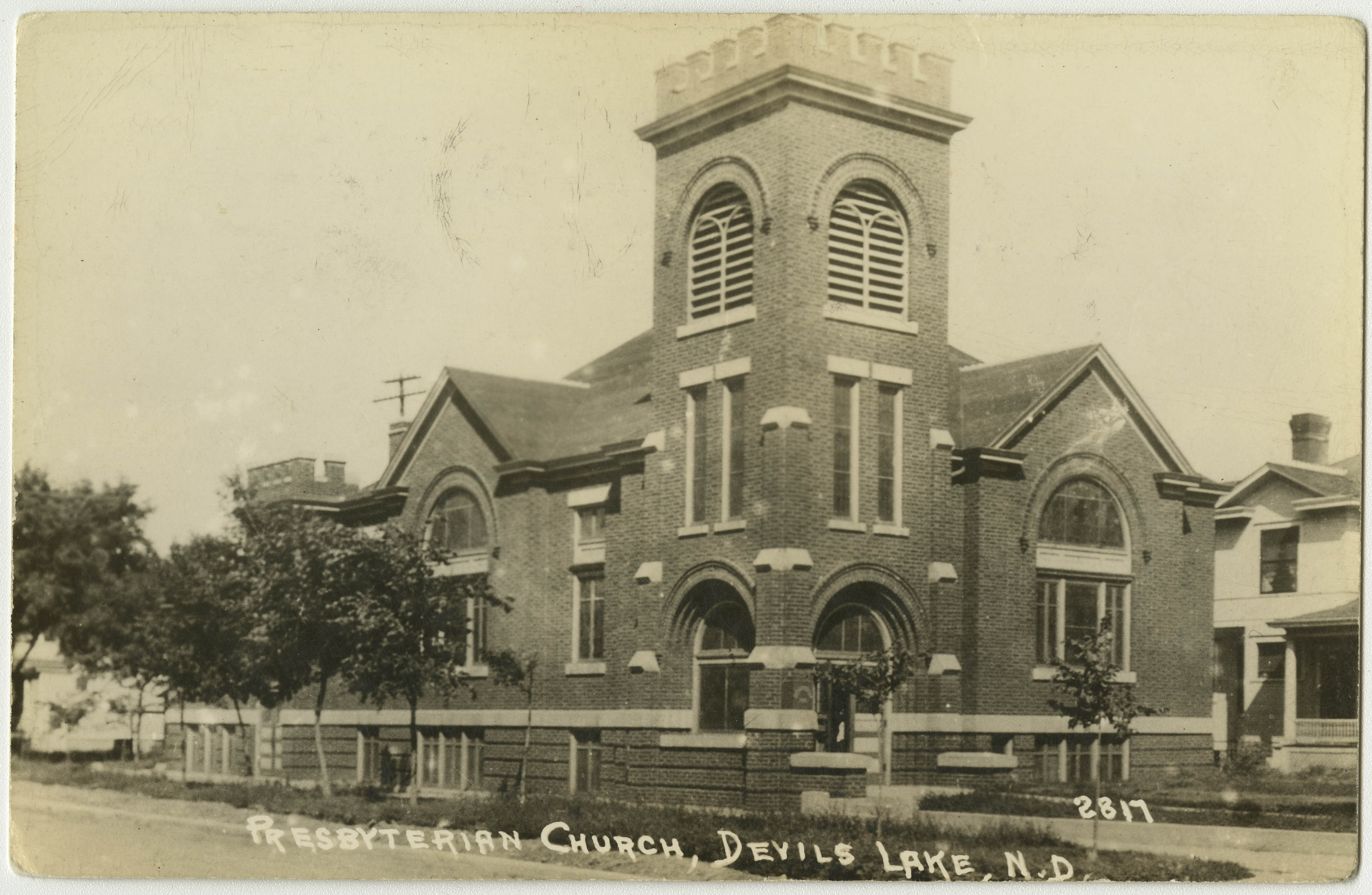

- Location within North Dakota Location within the United States
- Location: 501 5th St. NE., Devils Lake, North Dakota
- Coordinates: 48°6′47″N 98°51′31″W
- Area: 0.3 acres (0.12 ha)
- Built: 1915
- Built by: Halliday, Jacob
- Architect: Shannon, Joseph A.
- Architectural style: Romanesque
- NRHP reference No.: 08000679
- Added to NRHP: July 16, 2008

The Westminster Presbyterian Church on 5th St. NE. in Devils Lake, North Dakota was built in 1915. It was designed by local architect Joseph A. Shannon. It was listed on the National Register of Historic Places in 2008.
