= Newport Apartments =

- U.S. National Register of Historic Places
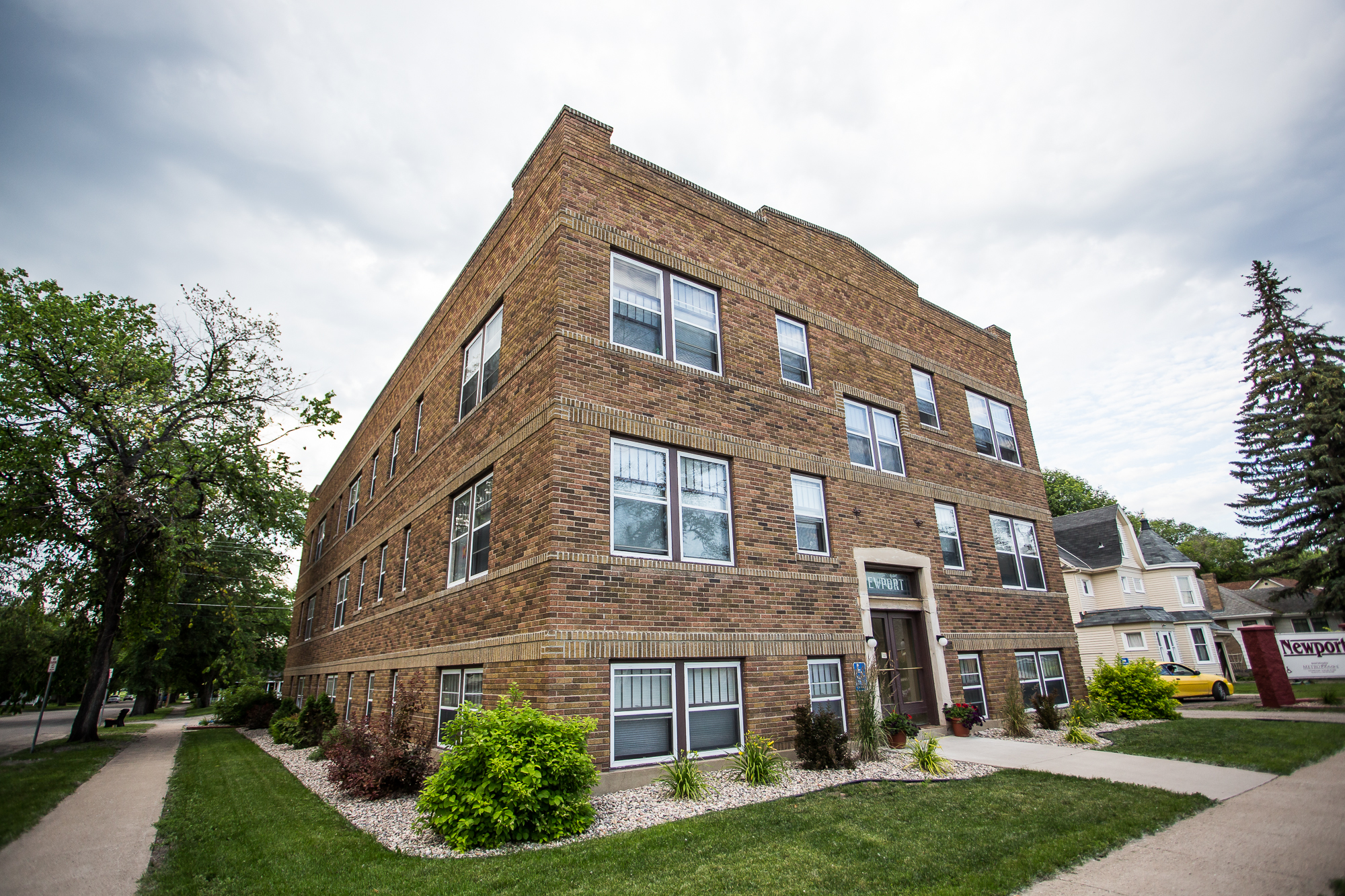
- Front entrance, 2014

- Location within North Dakota Location within the United States
- Location: 601 Seventh St., Devils Lake, North Dakota
- Coordinates: 48°6′54″N 98°50′36″W
- Area: less than one acre
- Built: 1929
- Built by: Fjelseth & Johnson
- Architect: John Marshall
- Architectural style: Bungalow/craftsman
- NRHP reference No.: 88000985
- Added to NRHP: July 11, 1988

The Newport Apartments on Seventh Street in Devils Lake, North Dakota were built in 1929. They were designed in Bungalow/Craftsman style by Devils Lake architect John Marshall. They were listed on the National Register of Historic Places in 1988.

It "represents the only known private commission by Devils Lake local architect, John Marshall, and is an excellent representative of the style."
