= Devils Lake Commercial District =

Historic district in North Dakota, United States

- U.S. National Register of Historic Places
- U.S. Historic district
- Location within North Dakota Location within the United States
- Location: Roughly bounded by 2nd Ave., 5th St., 5th Ave., 3rd St., and Railroad Ave., Devils Lake, North Dakota
- Coordinates: 48.11177°N 98.86039°W
- Area: 15 acres (6.1 ha)
- Architect: Shannon, John A.
- Architectural style: Late 19th and Early 20th Century American Movements, Modern Movement, Romanesque
- NRHP reference No.: 89001675
- Added to NRHP: October 24, 1989

The Devils Lake Commercial District in Devils Lake, North Dakota is a 15 acres (6.1 ha) historic district that was listed on the National Register of Historic Places in 1989.

It includes architecture by Joseph A. Shannon. It includes 44 contributing buildings, including the separately NRHP-listed U.S. Post Office and Courthouse and the Bangs-Wineman Block.

Its NRHP nomination describes a John A. Shannon, which appears to be a misstatement of local architect Joseph A. Shannon's name.
