= Kensal, North Dakota =

- City
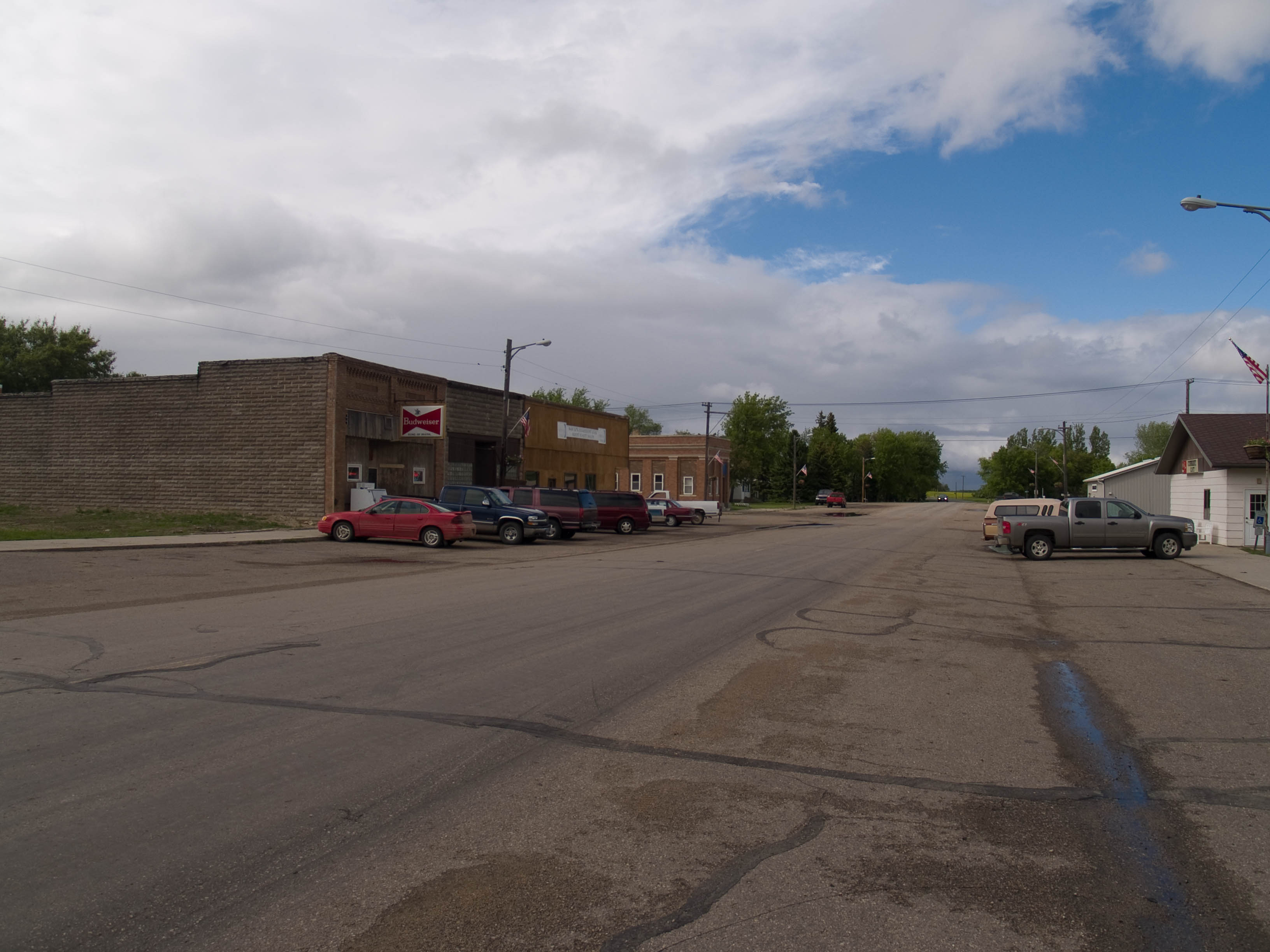
- Business district of Kensal

- Coordinates: 47°18′00″N 98°43′56″W
- Country: United States
- State: North Dakota
- County: Stutsman
- Founded: 1892

Area
  - Total: 0.60 sq mi (1.56 km^{2})
  - Land: 0.60 sq mi (1.56 km^{2})
  - Water: 0 sq mi (0.00 km^{2})
- Elevation: 1,539 ft (469 m)

Population (2020)
  - Total: 146
  - Estimate (2022): 147
  - Density: 241.6/sq mi (93.29/km^{2})
- Time zone: UTC-6 (Central (CST))
  - Summer (DST): UTC-5 (CDT)
- ZIP code: 58455
- Area code: 701
- FIPS code: 38-42180
- GNIS feature ID: 1036105
- Website: kensalnd.com

Kensal is a city in Stutsman County, North Dakota, United States. The population was 146 at the 2020 census. Kensal was founded in 1892.

It is the location of, or nearest community to, the Cecil Baker Round Barn, which was built in 1921 and is listed on the National Register of Historic Places.

== Geography ==
According to the United States Census Bureau, the city has a total area of 0.61 square miles (1.58 km^{2}), all land.

== Demographics ==
Historical population
Census	Pop.	Note	%±
1910	456		—
1920	415		−9.0%
1930	420		1.2%
1940	356		−15.2%
1950	376		5.6%
1960	334		−11.2%
1970	263		−21.3%
1980	210		−20.2%
1990	191		−9.0%
2000	161		−15.7%
2010	163		1.2%
2020	146		−10.4%
2022 (est.)	147		0.7%
U.S. Decennial Census; 2020 Census

=== 2010 census ===
As of the census of 2010, there were 163 people, 73 households, and 43 families residing in the city. The population density was 267.2 inhabitants per square mile (103.2/km^{2}). There were 83 housing units at an average density of 136.1 per square mile (52.5/km^{2}). The racial makeup of the city was 100.0% White.

There were 73 households, of which 26.0% had children under the age of 18 living with them, 52.1% were married couples living together, 4.1% had a female householder with no husband present, 2.7% had a male householder with no wife present, and 41.1% were non-families. 34.2% of all households were made up of individuals, and 20.5% had someone living alone who was 65 years of age or older. The average household size was 2.23 and the average family size was 2.91.

The median age in the city was 46.2 years. 17.8% of residents were under the age of 18; 7.3% were between the ages of 18 and 24; 23.3% were from 25 to 44; 30% were from 45 to 64; and 21.5% were 65 years of age or older. The gender makeup of the city was 47.2% male and 52.8% female.

=== 2000 census ===
As of the census of 2000, there were 161 people, 68 households, and 49 families residing in the city. The population density was 267.4 inhabitants per square mile (103.2/km^{2}). There were 86 housing units at an average density of 142.8 per square mile (55.1/km^{2}). The racial makeup of the city was 100.00% White.

There were 68 households, out of which 26.5% had children under the age of 18 living with them, 67.6% were married couples living together, 5.9% had a female householder with no husband present, and 26.5% were non-families. 25.0% of all households were made up of individuals, and 13.2% had someone living alone who was 65 years of age or older. The average household size was 2.37 and the average family size was 2.84.

In the city, the population was spread out, with 25.5% under the age of 18, 3.7% from 18 to 24, 19.3% from 25 to 44, 21.7% from 45 to 64, and 29.8% who were 65 years of age or older. The median age was 47 years. For every 100 females, there were 73.1 males. For every 100 females age 18 and over, there were 73.9 males.

The median income for a household in the city was $20,625, and the median income for a family was $50,625. Males had a median income of $37,500 versus $19,375 for females. The per capita income for the city was $17,088. About 5.7% of families and 9.2% of the population were below the poverty line, including none of those under the age of eighteen and 19.1% of those 65 or over.

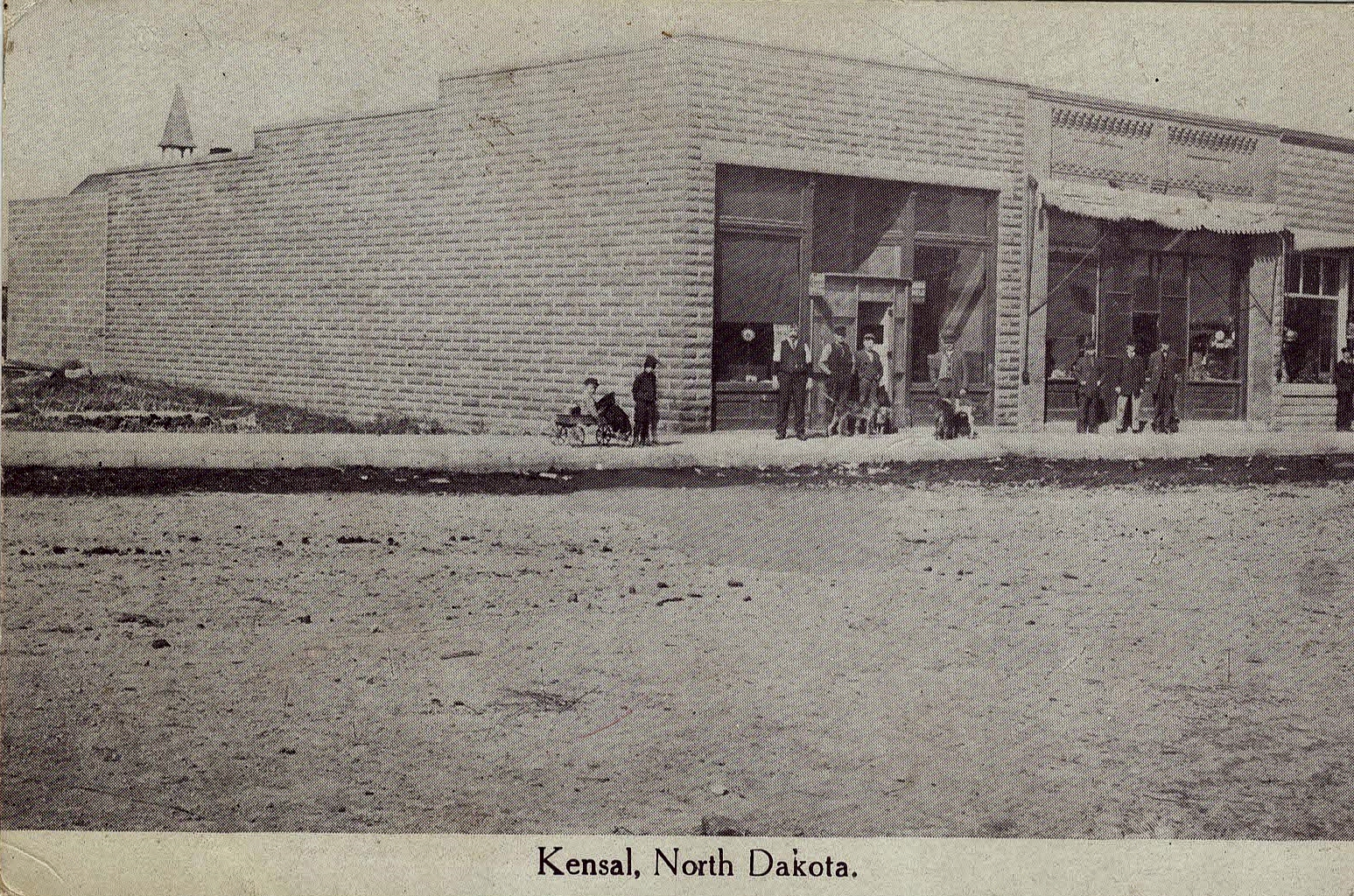
Kensal, North Dakota postcard from early 1900s

== Climate ==
This climatic region is typified by large seasonal temperature differences, with warm to hot (and often humid) summers and cold (sometimes severely cold) winters. According to the Köppen Climate Classification system, Kensal has a humid continental climate, abbreviated "Dfb" on climate maps.
