= United States Post Office and Courthouse (Devils Lake, North Dakota) =

- U.S. Post Office and Courthouse
- U.S. National Register of Historic Places
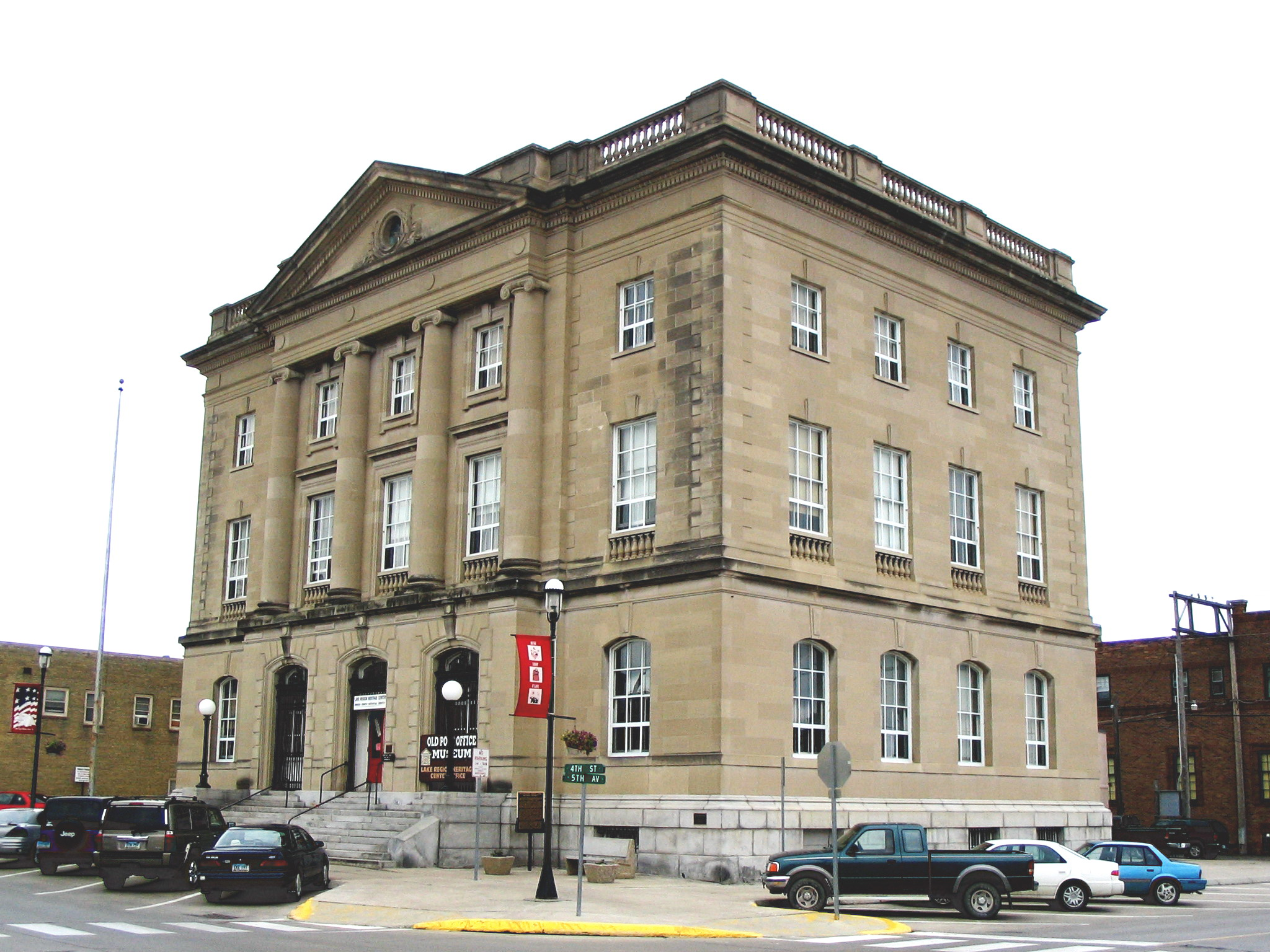

- Location within North Dakota Location within the United States
- Location: 502 4th St., Devils Lake, North Dakota
- Coordinates: 48°6′42″N 98°51′29″W
- Area: less than one acre
- Built: 1908
- Built by: General Construction Co.
- Architect: Taylor, James Knox
- Architectural style: Classical Revival
- NRHP reference No.: 78001993
- Added to NRHP: June 22, 1978

The U.S. Post Office and Courthouse in Devils Lake, North Dakota, was built in 1908. It was designed by James Knox Taylor and includes Classical Revival architecture. Also known as Devils Lake Post Office and as the Federal Building, it served historically as a courthouse and as a post office. The building was listed on the National Register of Historic Places in 1978.

According to its NRHP nomination, its Greek Revival styling is rare in North Dakota, and especially in Devils Lake, a "small rurally oriented community". In addition, the "quality of materials and workmanship set a nearly unattainable standard among contemporary buildings and, therefore, the 'Federal Building' became a cultural and artistic landmark to the community, a source of prestige still felt and honored."

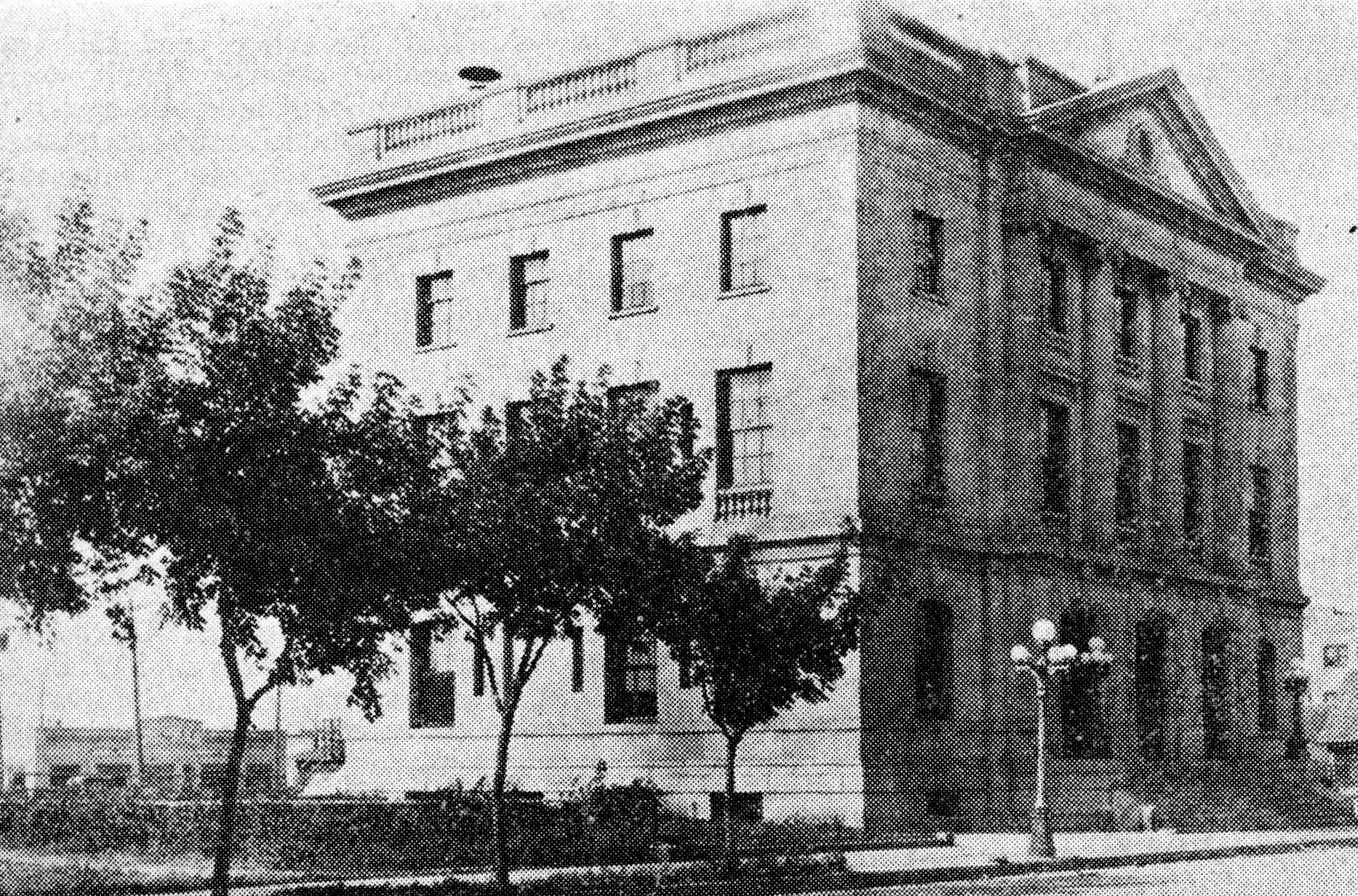
Post Office Building in Devils Lake, N.D., circa 1920

The Lake Region Heritage Center in the Old Post Office Building hosts many local and travelling exhibits. Exhibits include local history displays, a post office, recreations of a local doctor's and dentist office, the original federal courtroom, an early law office, a barber shop, and a display of Native American artifacts. The Center also hosts art exhibits in cooperation with the North Dakota Art Gallery Association.
